= CDU (disambiguation) =

CDU is the Christian Democratic Union, a German political party.

CDU may also refer to:

== Education ==
- Catholic Distance University, West Virginia
- Cebu Doctors' University, Philippines
- Charles Darwin University, Australia
- Charles R. Drew University of Medicine and Science, California, USA
- Chengdu University, China

== Organizations ==
- CentrumDemokraternes Ungdom, a youth organization in Denmark
- Country Development Unit, a non-governmental organization in Afghanistan

== Political parties ==
- Cameroon Democratic Union
- Caribbean Democrat Union
- Christian Democratic Union (East Germany)
- Christian Democratic Union (Netherlands)
- Christian Democratic Union (Ukraine)
- Croatian Democratic Union
- Unitary Democratic Coalition, Portugal
- United Christian Democrats, Italy
- United Democratic Centre (El Salvador)

== Technology ==
- Control display unit, in a remotely operated gasfield
- Control display unit, in an aircraft's flight management system
- Counter display unit, in a shop
- Crude oil distillation unit, in an oil refinery

== Other uses ==
- Cam and Dursley railway station, Gloucestershire, England
- Clinical decisions unit, a department in some hospitals
- Camden Airport (New South Wales), IATA airport code "CDU"
