= Gondola (disambiguation) =

A gondola is a traditional Venetian rowing boat, best known today for transporting tourists.

Gondola may also refer to:

== Places ==
- Gondola, Mozambique, the principal town of Gondola District, Mozambique
- Gondola Point, a community in New Brunswick, Canada
- Gondola Ridge, Antarctica

== Transport ==
=== Compartments or platforms ===
- Gondola (airplane), a compartment on the underside of a powered fixed-wing aircraft
- Gondola (airship), an external equipment or passenger compartment attached to a powered blimp or dirigible
- Gondola (balloon), a payload basket or capsule suspended beneath an unpowered hot air or gas balloon
- Gondola (Ferris wheel), a passenger car or cabin or capsule attached to the rim of the wheel
- Gondola, a capsule in which a test subject is situated at the end of the rotating arm of a human centrifuge
- Gondola lift, or cable car, a type of aerial lift
  - Gondola, used to carry passengers in various types of aerial lift
  - Bicable gondola lift
  - Tricable gondola lift
- Gondola, the cargo or passenger platform suspended beneath a transporter bridge
- Gondola, a suspended platform used by window cleaners
- Gondola, major component of the Falkirk Wheel rotating boat lift in Scotland, UK
- Spy gondola, an observation compartment lowered beneath an airship

=== Vehicles ===
- Gondola (rail), a type of railroad car with an open top and enclosed sides, for carrying loose bulk materials
- SY Gondola, an 1859 preserved steam yacht operated by the National Trust on Coniston Water, England

== Other uses ==
- Gondola (retail), a free-standing display unit
- Gondola Group, a restaurant chain with 600 locations in the UK and Republic of Ireland
- "Gondola no Uta" ("The Gondola Song")
- House of Gondola, a noble family from Dubrovnik, Croatia
- 1891 Gondola, an asteroid

== See also ==
- Gondolier (disambiguation)
- Gundalow, a type of flat bottom cargo boat once common on the rivers of New England, US
- List of gondola lifts
- Gundulić, a noble family from Dubrovnik, Croatia
