= Gondola (retail) =

Freestanding fixture used by retailers to display merchandise

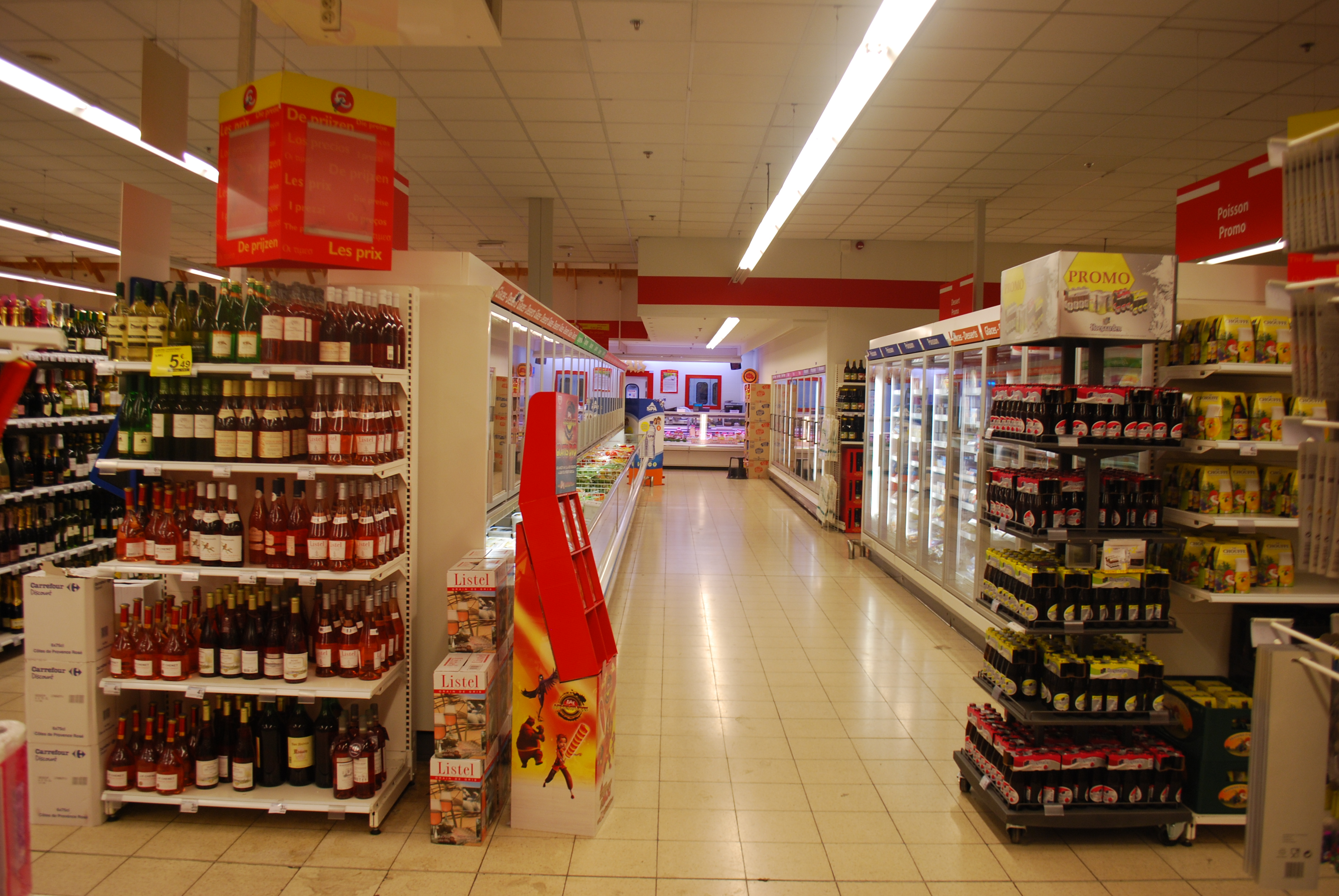
Freestanding display units in a supermarket

A gondola (usually pronounced /ɡɒnˈdoʊlə/ in this context) is a freestanding fixture used by retailers to display merchandise. Gondola shelving accounts for approximately 38.5% of global retail shelving demand, making it the dominant shelving format in physical retail. Gondola shelving is used to form aisles in supermarkets, convenience stores, pharmacies, beauty supply stores, and hardware stores. Gondolas typically consist of a flat base and a vertical component featuring notches, pegboards, or slatwalls. The vertical piece can be fitted with shelves, hooks, or other displays. Gondolas placed end-to-end can form rows of shelving, while stand-alone gondolas tend to be used for special themed displays. A gondola placed perpendicular to the end of a row of other gondolas can be used as an endcap. In Europe, gondola normally refers to double-sided shop shelving. In clothing stores, merchandising is carried out using 3-specialized shelving for clothing, and makes it possible to highlight specific products to increase the average basket at the checkout.

== See also ==
- Visual merchandising
- Endcap
