= Exhibition designer =

Professional who creates fixtures and display stands for events

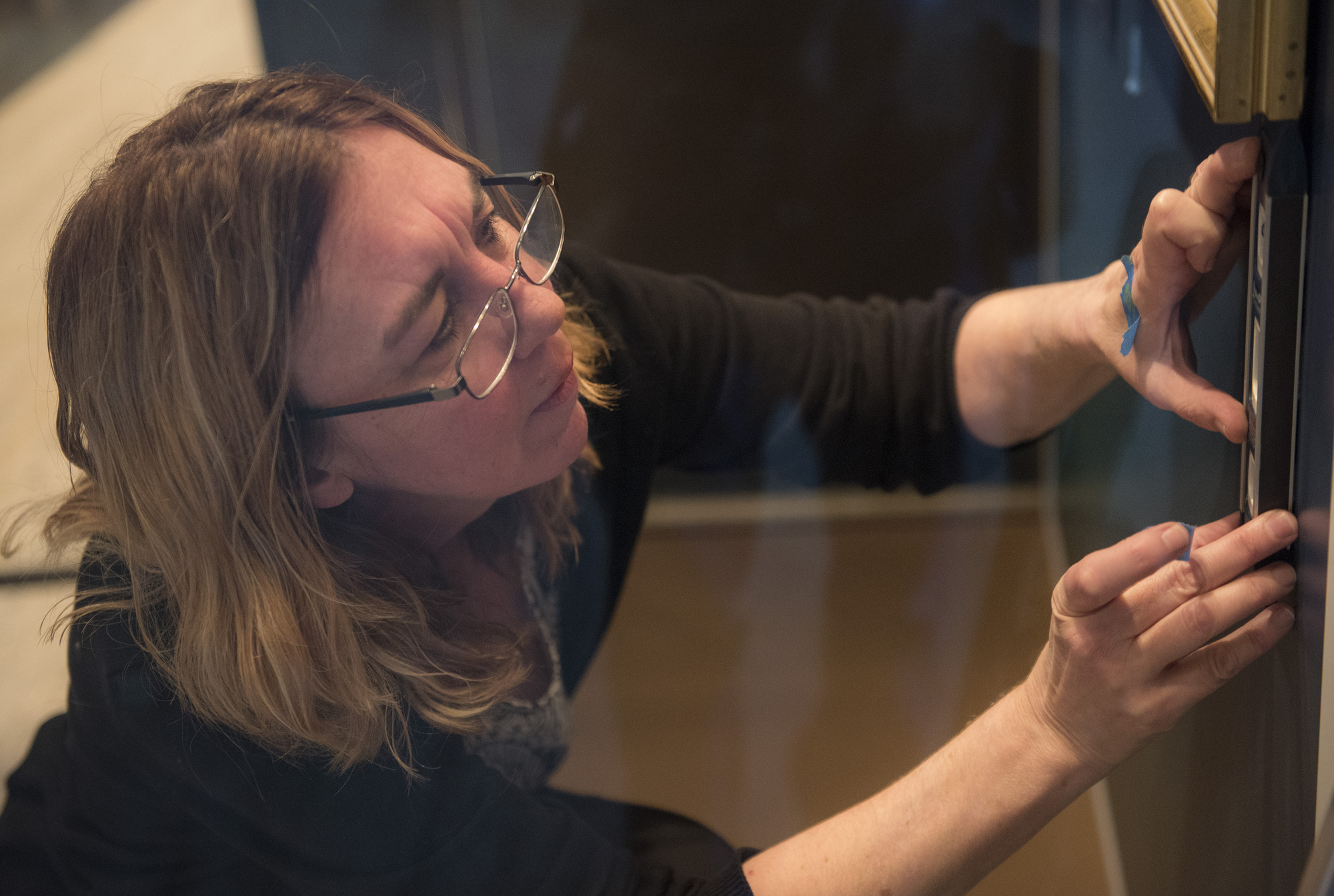
Exhibit designer leveling frame in exhibit.

An exhibition designer is a professional who creates fixtures and display stands for events such as large public exhibitions, conferences, trade shows and temporary displays for businesses, museums, libraries and art galleries.

== Duties ==
An exhibition designer's work can include:

- presenting their ideas as sketches, scale plans, computer-generated visuals and models
- discussing their ideas with clients
- producing final specifications
- in smaller companies, overseeing the construction of the components (usually in workshops) and assembly and installation at the exhibition venue
- handling orders for supplies
- liaising with technical specialists such as lighting staff
- understanding and interpreting the correct materials and costs involved in constructing the design
- creating large format artwork for backdrops and stand components
- designing vector based artwork for portable displays such as popup stands

== Employment ==
An exhibition designer might be employed as part of a team by an independent studio. Other employers include national and local government, and large organisations such as museums with their own design departments. There is a steady demand for the services of talented and experienced professionals. The work is studio or office based, but will usually also involve visiting clients or exhibition sites and in some cases may also involve being outside (i.e. outdoor zoos, parades).

== Education and training ==
Exhibition designers may come from many different backgrounds such as industrial design/product design, architecture, interior design or graphic design. Exhibition Designers are responsible for an exhibit from conception to completion and will incorporate many of the following knowledge and skills:

- Conceptual design
- Computer-aided design (CAD) and 3D visualisation
- Knowledge of safety, regulations and applicable standards
- Knowledge of current build methods
- Expertise in mathematics
- Model making skills
- Programming of CNC devices

Many different companies will have their own multi-purpose system that may be used for the construction of smaller exhibition stands; there are several different systems available and training into the specifics of each is usually conducted on a case by case basis. For larger stands such as double or triple-deckers, a good knowledge of architectural build methods is useful. An exhibition designer will usually work in conjunction with a structural engineer to ensure the safe implementation of structural columns and beams. When designing larger stands, the designer will take into account all local safety regulations, budget constraints, logistics, design aesthetics and any requirements for electrical and water supply. Sustainability and eco-friendly exhibition stand design is playing an important role in the exhibition industry and the future of trade shows.

== See also ==
- Cultural tourism
