= List of American Restoration episodes =

American Restoration is an American reality television series airing on the History channel. Produced by Leftfield Pictures, the series is filmed in Las Vegas, Nevada, where it chronicles the daily activities at Rick's Restorations, an antique restoration store, with its owner Rick Dale, his staff, and teenage son, as they restore various vintage items to their original condition.

The show is the first spin-off of Pawn Stars, in which Dale has appeared several times as an on-camera expert and has restored various items. The series has featured cameo appearances by the cast of Pawn Stars, American Pickers, magician Lance Burton, and NASCAR driver Greg Biffle. As of January 1, 2016, 138 episodes of American Restoration have aired.

== Series overview ==
Season	Episodes	Originally released	
Season	Episodes	First released	Last released
1	4	October 25, 2010	November 1, 2010
2	30	April 15, 2011	November 18, 2011
3	47	January 11, 2012	January 9, 2013
4	17	April 9, 2013	June 18, 2013
Special	1	December 19, 2013	
5	13	January 7, 2014	March 4, 2014
6	13	June 5, 2014	September 3, 2014
7	13	January 1, 2016	April 1, 2016

== Episodes ==
=== Season 1 (2010) ===
No. overall	No. in season	Title	Original release date
1	1	"Hopalong Rick"	October 25, 2010
Rick and the team restore a three-wheeled 1950s-era Marketeer golf cart purchased by Rick Harrison as a gift to his father. The team also restore a 1950s Hopalong Cassidy bicycle. Cameo appearances: – Rick Harrison, Corey "Big Hoss" Harrison, Richard "Old Man" Harrison and Austin "Chumlee" Russell
2	2	"Ice Cold"	October 25, 2010
The shop restores a 1940s Walzer-made Hershey's chocolate bar dispenser, and a 1950s Kelvinator refrigerator for a friend of Rick's who needs it by the end of the week as a birthday present for his mother. A particularly intractable coating of rust on an item spurs Rick to send Tyler and Ron to investigate a type of sandblasting called sodablasting, which uses sodium bicarbonate. A box in the alley near the shop's showroom is discovered to be infested with bees, which leads to a thankless task for Brettly, who dons a makeshift hazard suit held together with duct tape.
3	3	"Lights Out"	November 1, 2010
The shop restores one of the lamp posts on magician Lance Burton's property which was shattered into countless pieces by a windstorm. Though the lamps are modern re-creations of 1890s-style street lamps, they were custom made for the Monte Carlo Hotel from which Burton acquired them and require Ron, Kowboy, Tyler, and Brettly to gather all the debris from Burton's desert hillside property in order for it to be repaired. The shop also restores a 1930s Eco Model 15 tire air meter brought in by Tyler's math teacher, which belonged to his grandfather. Rick assigns Tyler the lead responsibility on the air meter, including giving the estimate, in order to encourage his education in the business, but Tyler's low estimate results in his having to finish the project by himself.
4	4	"Buttered Up"	November 1, 2010
The shop restores a large scale, 1956 Popsicle toy train locomotive, which includes creating two back cars from scratch to go with it, and an antique 1948 Manley popcorn machine, purchased by an elderly man from a Tennessee movie theater he used to frequent as a child before it recently closed permanently.

=== Season 2 (2011) ===
No. overall	No. in season	Title	Original release date
5	1	"Cooler Kings"	April 15, 2011
Rick and his team convert a 1950s Victor Coca-Cola cooler into a combination cooler and hot dog grill, based on an original 1950s model of which only fifty were made and five still exist. Meanwhile, Rick Harrison asks the team to restore a battered barber's pole, which he believes to be from the nineteenth century, with electrical equipment that has been added recently. Cameo appearances: – Rick Harrison, Austin "Chumlee" Russell
6	2	"Knockout"	April 15, 2011
The shop restores a Punch-A-Bag strength tester machine from the early 1900s, and a customer brings in an old railroad strongbox that was used to transport gold across the country. Both projects are done to retain their vintage appeal while still being fully restored. The strongbox is customized to have specific decals and markings, and Rick and his team include gold bars made from clay as a bonus.
7	3	"Duck and Cover"	April 22, 2011
Rick and his team restore a 1957 civil defense air raid siren, done pro bono for the Clark County Heritage Museum's exhibit on Nevada's nuclear physics history. Also, a rare nickel-plated Michigan cash register from the early 1900s comes into the shop.
8	4	"Pumped Up"	April 22, 2011
At a salvage yard, Rick and his brother Ron find a giant Fyr-Fyter fire extinguisher from the 1940s, and a gas pump from about 1919. While Rick hopes to auction off the gas pump after restoring it, the amount of money he puts into restoring the fire extinguisher limits his room for negotiation when a customer requires seeing it in action before buying it. Rick has to hire a professional to discharge the tank inside the fire extinguisher, which is estimated at being pressurized to over 400 psi.
9	5	"Space Kowboy"	April 29, 2011
Rick and his team restore a NASA helmet that was used in the Gemini missions. Meanwhile, an old picker needs a rusty gas cart fixed up. Rick and his team nearly destroy their oven trying to replicate the visor of the helmet, forcing Rick to hire an expert. Rick and his team also compete in a go kart race, which Rick and Tyler have a bet going where the loser has to sweep the shop.
10	6	"Jackpot"	April 29, 2011
Rick and his team restore a 1930s Watling slot machine, and overhaul a General Electric Pepsi cooler from the 1940s. Because the slot machine is missing almost all of its internal parts, Rick has to hire an expert to find a replacement mechanism. The cooler is converted from using cold water to chilled air. Meanwhile, Kyle and Kowboy make a bet where the loser has to drink an old Pepsi found in the cooler.
11	7	"Safe Keeping"	May 6, 2011
A 1940s cinema candy machine is restored. Also, a 1920s Herring-Hall Marvin safe is worked on. The safe's mechanism is rusted and no combination is given, so Rick has to hire an expert to help remove the lock.
12	8	"Suck Up"	May 13, 2011
A customer wants a 1940s Sav-Flyer little red wagon restored. The wagon was a childhood toy for the owner, and was customized to have a Hudson badge on the back. Rick and his team restore the wagon, including a rechroming of the emblem. Meanwhile, another customer wants a 1910s Arco Wand railroad vacuum cleaner restored. At the end, Brettly receives a digital camera as a "gift" after he nearly ruined the wagon project by not taking pictures of where the pieces were to go.
13	9	"Rev'd Up"	May 20, 2011
A customer wants his father's 1950s Matchless motorcycle restored. The logo on the bike was originally a decal, but is replaced with a painted logo. Meanwhile, Tyler works on a 1940s penny scale that was later converted to take dimes. Tyler almost ruins the project by breaking it, and Kyle has to bail him out.
14	10	"Apples and X-Rays"	May 27, 2011
A customer wants a 1940s department store X-ray machine designed to fit shoes. Rick has to hire an expert to determine whether the machine is still generating radiation. Afterward, Rick and his team replace the radiator with a lightbulb and pregenerated X-ray images. Meanwhile, another customer wants an 1880s apple corer and peeler restored. Also, Kowboy has to nail his toolbox to a table to prevent Brettley from taking his tools.
15	11	"Hot & Cold"	June 10, 2011
Tyler finds a 1950s Maxwell House vending machine near a dumpster at his school. Rick and his team restore it to resemble one from the Eldorado Casino. Meanwhile, a customer wants a 1930s Montgomery Ward refrigerator converted into a wine cooler. Rick hires Ted Hague to customize the paint to look more thematic of a wine cooler. The plastic interior is painted to resemble wood.
16	12	"Secret Fan"	June 17, 2011
A customer wants a 1960s McCulloch go-kart restored as a showpiece. Meanwhile, Tyler attempts to restore a 1950s Lasko electric fan for his dad for Father's Day. Tyler had gotten the fan for free, and while he hopes to restore it without spending any money, finds that the motor needs replacing. Tyler also matches his dad's favorite color, Tropical Turquoise. This is Rick's favorite color because it was the same color as his parents' 1957 Buick. At the end, it is revealed that Tyler installed the fan backwards.
17	13	"Grippin' Mad"	June 24, 2011
Tyler gets assigned to a Camel cigarettes Cub slot machine disguised to dispense gumballs. The "gumballs" on display are actually marbles and Rick and his team were able to repaint them. Meanwhile, Rick and his team restore a strength tester that had stood on the Santa Monica Pier. The machine originally took pennies, but was later converted to take nickels. Brettly hires a friend as his assistant. This friend turns out to be even lazier than Brettly, and Rick has Brettly fire him.
18	14	"The Pick, The Pawn, & The Polish"	July 11, 2011
Mike Wolfe and Frank Fritz bring in a 1957 Chevrolet 150, which Rick Harrison tasked them to find as a present for the Old Man's 70th birthday. In order for the job to be finished on time, Rick turns to Count's Kustoms restorations expert Danny Koker. Rick also restores an old neon sign from an Arizona coffee shop which John Wayne frequented, in hope that he can turn a profit on it. Cameo appearances: – Mike Wolfe, Frank Fritz, Rick Harrison, Richard "Old Man" Harrison, Austin "Chumlee" Russell, Corey "Big Hoss" Harrison, Danny Koker
19	15	"Anchors Away"	July 15, 2011
Rick and his team restore a 1952 Sea Skate speedboat kiddie ride for Fun Spot Arcade in New Hampshire. Mark from the Clark County Museum shows Rick a 1940s tricycle for him to restore to museum-piece quality. Meanwhile, Tyler and Ron are on a service call to fix the coin mechanism of an antique Pepsi machine at a local tattoo shop which Tyler is able to get done in 10 minutes, but has to wait for 2 hours while Ron gets a tattoo. Cameo appearance: – Mark Hall-Patton
20	16	"Special Delivery"	July 22, 2011
Rick purchases a turnstile from an old picker who specializes in exotic and astounding novelties. Kyle finds the choice absurd. Meanwhile, Rick and his team restore a 1940s United States Postal Service mailbox. A customer brings in a 1967 Harley-Davidson motorcycle he wants restored as a surprise anniversary gift for his wife. His wife had not seen the bike since she was twelve. Originally blue, the bike is repainted in black and orange. The bike is listed as weighing 115 pounds (52 kilograms). This makes it roughly equal to being a moped.
21	17	"Rusted and Busted"	July 29, 2011
The head of Lusse bumper cars wants a 1953 model restored. However, Rick and the customer cannot agree on a price, and Rick has to reject the offer. Meanwhile, another customer wants a 1960s kiddie ride restored. The ride consisted of a modified Italjet motorcycle mounted onto the kiddie ride mechanism. Meanwhile, another customer wants a Vendo change machine restored and painted to match his Pepsi machine. The change machine had previously been branded for Coca-Cola. Tyler doesn't read the work order, and paints the machine red, but is able to repaint it blue. Rick and his team find tokens in the motor of the bike. The mechanism of the ride is converted to take dimes.
22	18	"Batter Up"	August 26, 2011
A customer wants a 1940s baseball arcade game restored. The game, which had originally been on the Santa Cruz Beach Boardwalk, had originally used wooden balls, but had been converted to use steel balls. This resulted in severe damage to the figurines. Rick and his team have to create molds of the players in order to replace them all, including the creation of an entirely new catcher. Meanwhile, another customer wants a 1920s Weaver tire changer restored. The iron changer is extremely rusty, and after several different methods, would not move until being soaked in a pickle bath. Also, Kyle is having trouble getting his truck to run.
23	19	"Suds and Duds"	September 2, 2011
A customer wants his 1967 Honda Scrambler restored. The bike was the first thing he had ever purchased with his own money. Tyler gets assigned to finding a replacement for the bike's missing front fender. After having no luck at a scrapyard, Tyler then tries the phone book, eventually finding one with caging. Meanwhile, another customer wants a Trans World Airlines flight number sign restored. Also, Rick has Brettley get his truck washed. After getting it washed, Brettley stops by a stable to have lunch. However, a horse kicks up a lot of dust, which dirties the truck again. Brettley's punishment is to wash the truck himself.
24	20	"American Hero"	September 16, 2011
A customer wants his grandfather's Vietnam War Cobra helicopter gunner helmet restored. The helmet had been custom painted, and the customer wants the decal of his grandfather's regiment added. Meanwhile, another customer wants a rare 1940s Vendorlator Coke machine restored. Because the machine does not have raised lettering, a vinyl decal is used instead. Tyler doesn't listen, and asks if he can do the lettering. To teach Tyler a lesson, Rick has Tyler take lettering lessons.
25	21	"Close Shave"	September 23, 2011
A customer wants a rare 1940s Victor one door Coke cooler, of which only 200 were made. Rick asks Tyler to search the boneyard for the missing parts, but Tyler thinks that it'd be cheaper to buy the parts than to pay him for the man hours. To teach Tyler a lesson, Rick has Tyler and Brettley catalog every part in the boneyard. For careless reasons, they also catalog a baby rabbit. Meanwhile, a picker brings in various items to sell. The only item of interest to Rick is a 1930s Koken barber chair. The cushions have to be remade entirely and Rick has them covered with horse hide.
26	22	"Wheel and Deal"	October 14, 2011
Kelly forces Rick to restore a 1940s Kotex dispenser for a charity auction for breast cancer research. Originally white, the dispenser is painted pink with a pink ribbon for breast cancer awareness. The words below the Kotex logo are painted over. Rick has Tyler go to a pharmacy to get some feminine napkins for the dispenser. The dispenser sells for $400 at the auction. Meanwhile, a customer wants an 1880s Standard Oil fuel delivery wagon restored which causes an initial problem when the powder-coated paint won't allow itself to be removed, but Rick quickly finds it to be a more-than-adequate primer.
27	23	"Missile Impossible"	October 14, 2011
Rick Harrison wants a 1950s Atomic Missile kiddie car restored. Rick has Tyler supervise Brettley, but Tyler doesn't pay attention, and Brettley accidentally cuts through the metal. To teach Tyler a lesson, Rick has Tyler get a job. Tyler gets a job as a dish washer at a local pizza restaurant, but is eventually fired. Meanwhile, a customer wants a 1910s bus fare box restored. The box was originally black, but was later painted green. The original color is preserved.
28	24	"Cold War Cruisin'"	October 21, 2011
A customer wants a 1960s Čezeta scooter restored, which has not been run in over 2 years. Meanwhile, a customer wants a 1930s tin Sturdi Toy oil tanker restored. The toy had been originally purchased by her great-grandfather and had been handed down over the years. Meanwhile, members of Rick's team go to a flea market, where Ron purchases a Betty Boop salt and pepper shaker holder (which the other members, including Rick, find absurd).
29	25	"Tractors & Trucks"	October 21, 2011
A customer wants his father's Bantam tractor restored. The tractor is in pieces and requires study to determine where everything goes. Shortly before the customer arrives to pick up the tractor, Rick's team discovers that the steering mechanism is not functioning properly, but they are able to get it to work just in time. Meanwhile, another customer wants a locomotive air brake tester restored. Rick heads to the Nevada Northern Railway Museum in Ely, Nevada to see an expert on train parts.
30	26	"Surfing the Strip"	October 28, 2011
A museum owner wants a nineteenth century fire extinguisher cart restored. The cart had originally used a combination of sodium bicarbonate and sulfuric acid. The customer initially wants to give it a vintage appeal, but midway through the restoration project changes his mind and wants it ornate, which makes Rick wonder if they will make any money on work for the project. Meanwhile, Ron and Tyler purchase a 1960s motorized Jet Board surfboard from an old man, and Brettly is asked to test the board's buoyancy which he does at a casino pool that lands him in hot water. Meanwhile, Kowboy has a toothache. He does not want to pay an expensive dentist bill, so he removes the tooth himself with pliers.
31	27	"Smoking Hot"	October 28, 2011
The owner of a frozen custard store brings in a nineteenth century Round Oak potbelly stove from the set of Bonanza. Meanwhile, another customer wants his childhood toy railroad handcar, known as an Irish mail car, restored. Rick's compressor explodes, so everything has to be done by hand. Later, Rick buys another compressor, but it somehow will not run. It turns out that Brettley forgot to put fuel in it.
32	28	"Milking It"	November 4, 2011
Tyler and Ron go picking and buy a rare milk vending machine but spend more money than Rick had allowed them to spend. Tyler and Brettley find change in the machine, and decide to start their own savings fund for buying pizza, later emptying several old change holders for more money, which causes them to have a conflict with Kowboy and Kyle, who want all old change found at work to go to their Beer Fund. Meanwhile, a customer wants some 1950s amusement park handcars restored.
33	29	"Keep On Trucking"	November 11, 2011
Brettley buys a 1965 Chevrolet K10 as his personal vehicle for $1,500. He manages the project while receiving help other members of the crew. Meanwhile, Tyler and Ron go picking at the Pinball Hall of Fame. After looking at the many games in the storage area, including a table-top machine, they discover a Peek-A-View peep show machine from the 1950s. In order to find some film for the machine, Tyler and Ron go to the Burlesque Hall of Fame. While Ron thinks that it would be illegal for Tyler to go into the building (Tyler being a minor), it turns out that there is no age limit for the Hall. Rick is able to sell the machine and the new owner plans to lend the machine to the Hall of Fame.
34	30	"Bikes & Barbecues"	November 18, 2011
A customer wants a 1940s Maruishi bicycle restored, including reverting it to its original color, from green to black. The front fender ornament, a kangaroo, is missing, so Ted has to re-create one. He also gives Tyler a lesson in metal carving. Meanwhile, Rick shows a customer around the boneyard, where the customer finds a Chiclets vending machine. Meanwhile, Kelly is preparing for the company's annual barbecue dinner. She borrows $200, which she spends on veggie burgers, light beer, and low fat cheese (much to Rick's dismay). At the barbecue, the burgers are not met with much approval.

=== Season 3 (2012–13) ===
No. overall	No. in season	Title	Original release date
35	1	"Pain in the Gas"	January 11, 2012
A regular customer wants to purchase two visible gas pumps. Because Rick only has one, he sends Tyler and Ron out to find another. After countless searching, they finally find one that turns out to be an auto-stop. Meanwhile, another customer wants a horse racing gambling wheel restored.
36	2	"Ridin' Route 66"	January 11, 2012
Rick finds a Seeburg Wurlitzer jukebox while traveling on Route 66, which the owner wants restored. Meanwhile, Tyler and Ron work on a candy vending machine. Because the word "Candy" on top of the machine is broken, Tyler has to find a way to replace it, and finds someone with a water jet cutter to re-create the word. Meanwhile, Kowboy's cat has to go in for a checkup.
37	3	"Double Trouble"	January 18, 2012
Tyler and Ron find a tandem bicycle, which they restore without having Rick inspect it first. The project is done for an old picker who specializes in countless memorabilia including a replica of the original Batmobile. Meanwhile, a customer wants a century-old mutoscope restored. The original film in the mutoscope was a scene featuring Adam and Eve, but to make it less graphic, it is replaced with a film depicting a bar fight.
38	4	"Slick Pick"	January 18, 2012
Rick and his team continue picking on Route 66, finding a 1930s container for oil cans and another for windshield wiper blades. Tyler is put in charge of the wiper container project, but almost ruins the project by removing the rivets to take the container apart (the container being in very good condition and the rivets themselves being almost brand new). Tyler has trouble putting the pieces back together, but manages to finish the project with the help of Kyle. Meanwhile, a customer wants a Thomas Edison kinetoscope restored. Rick takes the containers to a local car show, but cannot find a buyer. Also, Rick's paint towels keep getting used up. Rick puts up a sign telling his team not to use them as tissues, but to no avail. He then installs a camera to determine the culprit, only to find that several of his employees are to blame.
39	5	"Buck Wild"	January 25, 2012
A customer wants a mechanical bull restored. The bull is restored using cowhide and a skull is added at the front. Meanwhile, a customer wants a rare gullwing Pepsi coller restored. Originally white, the cooler is painted blue with the classic Pepsi bottlecap logo on it as well as the "Pepsi Cola hits the spot" slogan. Ron is appointed to ride the bull, but chickens out at the last minute, so a dummy is used instead. Meanwhile, Tyler convinces Rick to buy him an old Ford F-100 for his graduation present.
40	6	"The Big Move"	January 25, 2012
Rick has purchased a larger building for his business close to the Las Vegas Strip, and everyone has to pitch in to help move everything. Meanwhile, a customer wants a 1940s Santa Cruz Boardwalk penny scale restored. Also, a picker arrives at the shop, and Ron buys an old Taylor Tot baby stroller for $50. However, they dismantle it before taking pictures of the stroller, and have to reconstruct it. A few parts are missing, so they have to be refabricated by hand. Rick is able to sell the stroller for $1,500.
41	7	"Bumper Balls"	February 1, 2012
A customer wants a Farmall tractor toy restored. The toy is customized to have a photo of the customer's family on the seat. Meanwhile, another customer wants a Pier 39 bumper car restored. Kowboy teaches Brettley to put all the parts in a box so he doesn't lose them. To reduce stress in the work place, the team participates in a paintball match.
42	8	"Cold Cuts"	February 1, 2012
A customer ships Rick a nineteenth century meat slicer. In order to preserve the paint job, Rick has it given a powder coating. Meanwhile, another customer wants a postage stamp vending machine restored. The lock is broken, so Rick has to find a locksmith to help with it and create a key for it. Also, while on a picking trip, Brettley's truck breaks down. It turns out that the motor is totaled due to Brettley not checking his oil for several months. While Rick is driving to pick them up, Ron purchases a cargo truck for $7,000 on the company card without Rick's permission. To teach Brettley a lesson about changing oil, he is required to check the oil of all the company trucks on a daily basis.
43	9	"The Big Bang"	February 8, 2012
A couple wants their Civil War era cannon restored. Rick hires an expert to verify that it is indeed a Civil War cannon. After it is finished, per request from the owners, Rick continues their family tradition of the couple of firing it once a year (it had not been fired for at least twenty years). Meanwhile, a customer wants a slot machine from the Silver Slipper casino restored. Originally silver, the machine is painted black. Rick hires an expert to deal with the mechanism. Also, Rick visits an antique shop as a potential customer.
44	10	"Top Dog"	February 8, 2012
A customer wants his childhood toy horse restored. Originally brown, the horse is painted white with a black mane and tail. Leather reins are added. Meanwhile, a customer wants a dog tag machine restored. A few parts such as a clipboard and a lamp are missing, and have to be re-created. Also, Brettley adopts a dog from a local shelter.
45	11	"Pump & Gun"	February 15, 2012
Ron and Tyler find a rare 1910s hand-cranked, air assisted gas pump, which they buy for $400 from an old picker whose collections range from a billiards-themed pinball machine to many classic cars. They are able to sell the pump for $9,000. Meanwhile, a customer wants a trap shooter restored. Because the customer plans to use the machine, the shooter is given a powder coating.
46	12	"Tall Order"	February 15, 2012
A customer wants a 1930s Pep Boys statue restored for the Petersen Automotive Museum. The marquee originally featured one of the figures smoking a cigar, but it was later removed, and has to be re-created. Meanwhile, a couple wants a 1948 Coke machine restored. The machine was one of the few things salvaged from their store, which was destroyed by Hurricane Irene.
47	13	"Tyler's Promotion"	February 22, 2012
Tyler gets promoted to shop foreman, and assigns Ron and Kowboy to build him a desk. Meanwhile, an elderly couple want a 1920s Alba gramophone restored. The player had been in a bird-filled area and therefore had bird feces all over it, which needed to be cleaned off. A swing record is included with the finished project. Meanwhile, a regular customer wants a 1915 Gunnite cement gun restored for the Railroad Museum. Such sprayers had been originally used to reinforce tunnels to prevent cave-ins. For demonstration purposes, Rick uses a nonhazardous material rather than cement.
48	14	"Blast Off!"	April 11, 2012
(1 Hour Episode) A customer wants a 1960s rocket ship themed playground slide restored. The slide is in pieces and many are in bad shape. All Rick and his team have to go on is a photo of the original. The crew experiences many problems which delay their progress, as well as having the fiberglass worker offer triple the original price estimated, putting the project way overbudget. However, they discover a way to save a lot of time and money. The slide is also an enormous project, at 30 ft (9 m). Meanwhile, a customer wants a 1940s gas pump converted into a coin counter for his bank. An LCD screen is added to the pump and the crank is removed. Meanwhile, another customer wants his childhood Buddy L toy steamroller restored. Many of the pieces are broken, so Tyler has them remade by a jet blaster. Many of the parts of the steamroller are blasted using dry ice.
49	15	"King of Signs"	April 18, 2012
A customer wants a 1960s El Ray Casino billboard restored, but given a vintage appeal. Meanwhile, another customer wants an early twentieth century love tester machine restored. The machine had originally been made in Britain, so Rick may have to convert it to American wattage.
50	16	"Hot & Salty"	April 18, 2012
A customer wants a Michelin air compressor restored. Meanwhile, a couple chooses a popcorn warmer from the boneyard to use in their theater room. Also, Rick proposes to Kelly.
51	17	"Treats & Feet"	April 25, 2012
A customer wants a 1940s Good Humor bicycle restored. Also, another customer wants his grandparents' 1920s Atwater-Kent radio restored. Meanwhile, Rick establishes a new policy where his employees must wear proper shoes, much to Ron's dismay. The bicycle is given period graphics, having originally only had simple lettering.
52	18	"Restoration Rivalry"	April 25, 2012
Two scooters come into the shop, one from the twenties and one from the fifties, both of which are family heirlooms for the customer. Rick and Tyler have a contest to see who can finish their scooter the fastest. Rick's has more parts and a wooden base, and is thus harder to work on by hand, but he manages to finish it by himself. Tyler, on the other hand, despite having the simpler project, decides to get help. He sandblasts the parts without tracing the artwork first, so they have to look up another of the same kind. Tyler, attempting to "even the odds", steals one of the spokes from Rick's project. Both scooters are finished on time. Meanwhile, a regular customer wants a 1940s candy machine restored. The mechanism is missing, so Rick has to search for one. Originally red, the machine is painted teal.
53	19	"Cannonball Safe"	May 2, 2012
A mother wants to buy a safe for her son after his coin collection was stolen when their house was broken into. The safe they choose weighs an estimated 3,000 pounds (1,361 kilograms) and comes with a mechanism designed to set the lock to only open at certain times of the day. Originally black, the safe is painted green. The copyright information is painted over. The safe was designed to survive an atomic bomb blast. Meanwhile, another customer wants her family farm egg candler restored. The candler also comes with a weight scale. Also, Ron and Tyler go picking. They purchase a giant coffee grinder, a Shriners parade kiddie car, and a 19th-century grinding wheel, for $625. While Rick approves of the grinder and car, he finds the wheel (which is cracked) to be useless.
54	20	"Motor Mayhem"	May 9, 2012
A customer comes in wanting to purchase the coffee grinder from Cannonball Safe. The grinder is missing some parts, so Tyler has to look for them. The grinder is painted red and orange. Meanwhile, another customer wants his father's Evinrude outboard motor restored. Originally green, the motor is chromed except for the area around the logo, which is painted red and yellow. Also, Brettley demonstrates Nana's obedience so he can have her around the shop.
55	21	"Sticky Fingers"	May 16, 2012
A customer brings his uncle's Zeno gum dispenser. Meanwhile, a regular customer brings in a taxi meter. Tyler appoints Brettley to the meter project. Meanwhile, Rick decides to have a new façade built for his shop. The façade resembles a 1940s downtown street.
56	22	"Dirt Bike Duel"	June 6, 2012
Greg Biffle brings in a 1970s Montessa off road motorcycle. Rick and Greg decide to have a race once the bike is finished. The bike's components are filled with acorns likely left by a family of squirrels. Meanwhile, another customer wants a 1950s Kidillac pedal car restored. NASCAR driver Greg Biffle has a cameo.
57	23	"Train Trouble"	June 6, 2012
The owner of the Nevada Northern Railway Museum wants a speeder car restored. Tyler and Brettley estimate the project as being $12,000, but Rick believes that to be too low. Meanwhile, another customer wants a 1930s NYPD call box restored. Rick also receives an old tricycle and some old Tonka toy trucks. The trucks are determined not to be worth restoring.
58	24	"Feel the Heat"	June 13, 2012
A couple bring in what they believe to be an Irish mail cart. They ask that, if the cart is rare, that it should be restored to its original condition. If the cart is not rare, it should be made flashy. After Rick takes it to an expert, it is revealed that the cart is actually a motorized wheelchair, and is very rare. Meanwhile, another customer brings in a giant gas powered stove. Rick has an expert check for leaks in the piping, as the customer wishes to use it himself. The stove had been sitting next to the customer's father's church for decades. Meanwhile, Tyler uses Google Maps to find a picking site. They purchase rusty car parts for $100 and two ice boxes, including a rare two door box, for $300.
59	25	"Down & Dirty"	June 13, 2012
A customer brings in a 1972 Honda ATC. The front tire is missing, so Tyler has to search for one online. Meanwhile, another customer wants his grandfather's rifle restored. After Rick hires an expert to analyze the gun, it is determined to be a Revolutionary War musket, and that restoration would dramatically devaluate the gun. Also, Ron and Tyler plan a bachelor party for Rick. The party has to be "PG", so Ron and Tyler rent ATVs for them all to ride. Meanwhile, another customer wants an Edison phonograph restored. The phonograph had been his grandfather's.
60	26	"Saddle Up!"	June 20, 2012
A customer wants his childhood rocking horse restored. The horse had been hand-made especially for him by a friend of his family. The customer wants it to resemble Roy Rogers' horse Trigger. The rocking horse had originally featured leather ears and real horse hair for the tail, but both had since been lost. Meanwhile, another customer wants a 1950s Cushman motor scooter restored. The sidecar is painted in a hot rod style. Also, Ron wants to buy several pedal cars for the shop, but Rick insists that they wait until they find customers for the cars.
61	27	"Big Boom"	June 20, 2012
A customer wants an early 20th century signal cannon restored. Meanwhile, Brettley hosts a company auction. Also, another customer wants an Italian folding bicycle restored.
62	28	"Strong Arm"	September 12, 2012
Rick and his team restore a 1950s arm wrestling strength tester. Also, a 1930s "Easy" wringer washer is restored to showroom condition.
63	29	"Phony Baloney"	September 19, 2012
A Shriner is interested in the Shriner's car Rick picked up in an earlier episode. The car is restored to match his Model T, with a memorial image of his son added. Also, a fireman wants a regional emergency phone restored. The phone had been used to call park rangers in his district in the 1930s.
64	30	"Right Here, Rum Now"	September 26, 2012
Sammy Hagar hires Rick to turn a vintage refrigerator into a dispenser for his brand of rum due to the drink's unexpected popularity. Also, Rick and his team work on an old slot machine.
65	31	"Soda Jerks"	October 3, 2012
A client has high expectations of Rick and the crew when he agrees to a $10,000 restoration of his 1950s soda fountain. A repeat customer asks Rick and his team to restore his vintage phone booth. Kelly thinks Rick works too much and challenges him to spend some time away from the shop. They attempt to go on an outing to a local lake, but Rick keeps getting phone calls from his customer. At the end, Kelly tosses the phone into the lake.
66	32	"Prank War"	October 10, 2012
Rick suits up to restore a basketball arcade game from the 1950s but problems with its electronics force him to enter into a unique business agreement. At the shop, a simple disagreement between Tyler and Ron escalates into an all-out prank war. Later, Rick and the team are challenged by a client to make an antique barber chair resemble his Shelby Cobra. The chair is customized to use actual Cobra leather, with striping to match the Cobra, a shift nob for a height adjuster, and a rollbar behind the headrest.
67	33	"Pimp Chum's Ride"	October 17, 2012
Pawn Star actor Chumlee rolls into the shop with a 1950s Murray pedal car and a specific vision for how he wants it restored. They agree that it should be restored instead of customized, but Tyler decides to add some lights to make it flashier. The lights are easily removable and will not depreciate the value of the car. Later, the crew works to fix up a 1965 Honda Superhawk that hasn't run since the 80s and is missing the fuel tank. Tyler has to visit a grumpy parts dealer in order to find the tank.
68	34	"Hammered"	October 24, 2012
A customer drops off a giant high striker. Rick and the customer make a deal where if the customer beats Rick, he will receive a discount. Another customer brings in a 19th-century nail gun. The gun is designed to fire the nail into the wood, after which the nail must be hammered into the wood manually. The gun is restored to look vintage.
69	35	"Busted Beemer"	October 31, 2012
A customer brings by a disassembled 1959 BMW motorcycle with a side car for Rick to restore. The sidecar was added later and was designed to also act as a bed. Later, the guys work on an antique pencil dispenser that will be auctioned off for a special cause, and Rick is visited by a picker who has some unique items for sale.
70	36	"Planes and Flames"	November 28, 2012
Rick is contacted by Nellis Air Force Base to restore their replica of an F-105 fighter jet. Will the crew be able to execute their plan of attack to restore the fighter, or will they miss the mark and abort the mission? Later, Tyler's skills are challenged when a unique Buffalo Forge Grill rolls into the shop requiring a much needed tune up.
71	37	"Nut Job"	November 28, 2012
A client's expectations are sky high when he agrees to a $10,000 restoration of his early 1900s peanut roaster. Later, Ron and Tyler go digging for gold in a California picker s backyard that is loaded with antique gas pumps and signs. Ron buys a vintage English taxi and sets out to prove to Rick that it was worth the investment.
72	38	"Call the Count"	December 5, 2012
When a 1960s Pak Trak hunting scooter lands at the shop, Rick calls Danny "The Count" to check out the unique dirt mobile. Later, Kelly purchases a classic Mosrite guitar for Brettly's birthday and asks Rick to restore it even though he's never done one before. Will Rick be able to figure it out in time for Brettly's big day or will he leave Kelly disappointed?
73	39	"Harrison's Vendorlator"	December 5, 2012
Pawn Star Rick Harrison stops by the shop to get his vintage Pepsi dispenser restored and Rick is left stunned when he discovers it's one-of-a-kind. Will the crew ace this unique restoration or will they miss the mark with the classic machine? Later, Rick feels the pressure when a group of people in Kansas pool their money and hire him to fix up a neon sign that has huge historical significance to their town.
74	40	"Break In"	December 12, 2012
When a 1930s Custer Car ride from an amusement park arrives, the crew puts it on the fast track. Later, a heavily damaged, 8000 pound safe is dropped at the shop. Since it hasn't been opened in years, its contents are a mystery. Can Rick crack the vault and pull off a miracle restoration?
75	41	"Bombshell"	December 12, 2012
A unique electric wheelchair made from parts of a 1940s B-17 bomber lands at the shop. Will the crew hit the target with this one of a kind job or will they bomb the restoration? Later, Kelly makes Tyler and Brettly super uncomfortable by doing a risque photo shoot as an anniversary surprise for Rick.
76	42	"One Horse Open Sleight"	December 19, 2012
An antique horse drawn sleigh arrives at the shop needing a complete transformation for the holidays. Rick gets a "knock out" of a gift at Rick Harrison's Christmas party and it gets him in the spirit. Later, Big Mike comes by with a 1930s Dixie Cup dispenser that's missing a key part.
77	43	"Clueless"	December 19, 2012
A vintage scooter is shipped to the shop for a complete restoration. Rick is stumped on the make and model, so he calls on Danny "the Count" to take a look at it. Will Danny be able to shed some light on the mystery or will the job turn cold? A dentist stops by with his 1920s x-ray machine and Rick is concerned that the machine could be dangerous to restore.
78	44	"Employee of the Month"	January 2, 2013
The team is challenged when a late 1800s penny-farthing bicycle is delivered to the shop needing a major restoration. Rick tries to motivate some of the crew to work harder at the shop by implementing an Employee of the Month award. And later, the guys work on a 1930s parlour stove that hasn't been functional in decades.
79	45	"Stolen Memories"	January 2, 2013
A customer has huge expectations of Rick's work when she agrees to pay $9500 to restore a 1959 coin-operated Western Express amusement ride. A client steals his wife's treasured 1960s Murray tricycle and brings it to Rick so he can surprise her with a restoration. Later, a rare apple vending machine from 1930s arrives at the shop in the mail.
80	46	"Escorter Service"	January 9, 2013
A rare "Escorter" from the 1964 World's Fair scoots into the shop for a restoration. Will Rick and the crew give this vintage vehicle a restoration that out of this world or will it be a world-class flop? Later the guys work on an antique tool sharpener that a client picks out of the Boneyard.
81	47	"Bear Down"	January 9, 2013
A rare "Shoot The Bear" arcade game arrives at the shop needing so much work that Rick is forced to call in an electronics expert to assist with the restoration. Later, Kowboy clashes with Rick about the shop's uniforms and tries to persuade him to change the color of their work shirts.

=== Season 4 (2013) ===
No. overall	No. in season	Title	Original release date
82	1	"Vacuum Daze"	April 9, 2013
Rick gets a chill when a beat up 50's Bevador beverage cooler comes in for a fix-up. Then, when a rare 40's Rexair vacuum/air filter arrives in pieces, Rick wonders if he'll ever be able to puzzle it all back together.
83	2	"Photo Finish"	April 9, 2013
When a rare 1930s photo booth arrives at Rick's, the crew shoots for a picture perfect restoration. Later, Rick sends his team to the Rose Bowl Flea Market, where he sold his very first machine decades ago. Will the guys make Rick proud or will they come back empty-handed?
84	3	"Harleys and Horsies"	April 16, 2013
When a hacked up 1970s Harley-Davidson Golf Cart is dropped into the shop, Rick vows to give it a restoration worthy of its manufacturer, inspiring a bet that will guarantee the loser ridicule. And a vintage 1950s toy horse pedal cart trots in for much needed rejuvenation. Can Rick and his crew meet the challenge?
85	4	"Mixed Signals"	April 16, 2013
When a 1920s "wig wag" train signal arrives, Rick and his crew move full steam ahead on the restoration. Will this restoration stay on track or get run off the rails? Later, Kelly plans a car show at the shop, and Rick challenges the crew to find the baddest ride for a mystery prize.
86	5	"Atomic Restoration"	April 23, 2013
Rick shoots to beat the clock with a 40's high-school electric scoreboard. Can this restoration score, or will Rick run out of time? Also, an atomic age Uranium Detector arrives for a scientific spruce-up. Will the finished product be rad enough to detect this rare element?
87	6	"Sand Hassle"	April 23, 2013
When a 1920s floor sander rolls in, Rick and his crew clean up their act. Can the guys make this a smooth restoration or will they be left in the dust? Later, an antique apple vending machine that needs a healthy dose of TLC is shipped to the shop.
88	7	"Pests and Pins"	April 30, 2013
When a 50's Bowling Equipment Vending Machine rolls into Rick's, the guys take aim and hope for a strike. Later, a 1900s Antique Copper Pest Sprayer buzzes to the shop. Can the crew manage both projects?
89	8	"Bimbo and the Beasts"	April 30, 2013
Rick puts the pedal to the metal when a toy 1950s Ferrari "Bimbo" Racecar cruises into the shop. And later, Ron, Tyler and Brettly go on a big pick finding not only a rare safe, nickelodeon, and cigar dispensing slot machine, but also live tigers.
90	9	"Golf Ball and Chain"	May 7, 2013
When a 1920s chainsaw arrives, the crew powers up for a razor-sharp restoration. And another customer brings in a unique slot machine–one that dispenses golf balls instead of coins. Both items present Rick and his team with what look like insurmountable problems.
91	10	"American Respiration"	May 7, 2013
When a 1937 Iron Lung rolls into the shop for a restoration, Rick visits a strange former client in hopes of unlocking the project's mysteries. Then, a prank war breaks out after Ron gives Tyler lip and no one knows who's getting the last laugh. Later, Brettly brings in a big haul after his first solo picking trip.
92	11	"Billy Joel: A Matter of Rust"	May 28, 2013
(1 Hour Episode) When Billy Joel decides "This is the Time" to bring an item near and dear to his heart to Rick, the team prepares for a rock-star restoration. Then, Rick sends Ron, Tyler and Brettly out on a picking competition–best item picked wins a trip with Rick to reveal the restoration to "The Piano Man" in New York! And later, a walk-behind tractor steps into the shop. Can Rick "Get it Right the First Time" or will the "Pressure" get to him?
93	12	"Un-Predicta-ble"	June 4, 2013
When a 1950s Predicta TV arrives for an update, Rick must decide how to combine old-school nostalgia with modern-day technology. Later, an 1890s barber-shop towel steamer makes an appointment for a razor-sharp restoration. Then, when Rick asks Tyler and Brettly to create a TV ad to show off the Predicta remodel, he wonders if they'll make a commercial masterpiece or a small-screen snafu.
94	13	"Sofa King Cool"	June 4, 2013
When Pawn Stars' Rick Harrison arrives at the shop looking for his son Corey's birthday present, Rick Dale suggests a new couch made from and old car. But the hunt for the coolest classic proves more difficult than he thought. Can Rick Dale make a sofa suitable for Corey's man cave or will the project be a wreck on wheels?
95	14	"Gone to Pieces"	June 11, 2013
When Rick's favorite customer Big Mike comes in with a 1964 Ducati motorcycle in a basket, the search is on for rare parts. Can the shop complete this Italian job or will the pressure cause them to crash? Later, Tim from the Pinball Hall of Fame needs Rick's help on a 1960s Gatling gun arcade game. Can the crew hit the mark or will the restoration go up in smoke?
96	15	"Star Wreck"	June 11, 2013
When a star-shaped 1970s Carl's Jr. sign arrives in need of a fast-food facelift, Rick and his team aim for a restoration that's out of this world. Will the stars align for a tasty tune-up or will Rick be left with a belly ache? And later, Ron returns from a monster picking trip with a huge haul. Can he sell his treasures and earn Rick's approval or will he be left with a pile of junk? Ron tries to sell a pump to a biker
97	16	"Thin Tin Tin"	June 18, 2013
Rick gets a visit from Grammy-winning singer-songwriter Jason Mraz, bringing in a sign to be restored in honor of his late grandfather. Will this project hit all the right notes or will Rick be singing the blues? Later, the crew converts a classic gas pump into a kick-ass "keg-erator". Can Rick create a macho beer machine or will his ideas get tapped out?
98	17	"Dodger Doggin' It"	June 18, 2013
Rick steps up to the plate to transform a vintage 1950s Coke cooler into a LA Dodgers inspired hot dog cart. But when he finds out he'll be revealing it to baseball greats Tommy Lasorda, Ron Cey, and Paul Lo Duca, Rick swings for the fences to do an all-star restoration. Can Rick hit a home run with this dream-come-true project or will the pressure cause him to strike out?

=== Christmas special (2013) ===
No. overall	No. in season	Title	Original release date
99	S1	"A Very Vegas Christmas"	December 19, 2013
Celebrate the holidays Vegas style as the guys from Pawn Stars, Counting Cars and American Restoration get together for a Christmas barbecue. First they'll deck the halls with pawn shop drama, when they debate the best and worst deals they've ever made.

=== Season 5 (2014) ===
No. overall	No. in season	Title	Original release date
100	1	"Armed and Rusty"	January 7, 2014
Rick realizes with business booming, he'll need to hire extra hands to keep the shop running smoothly. But when new guy Chris is tested on a Dale Drake scooter that arrived in pieces, he must put Kowboy's hazing aside and prove he can hack it. Then, a suit of armor arrives for a regal restoration. Can a trip to a Renaissance fair inspire the guys to take this hunk of metal from a pile of parts to a piece of history?
101	2	"Pegasus on a Pedestal"	January 7, 2014
Rick and his crew see a big challenge after a rare 1940s Mobil Pegasus sign rolls into the shop. And when the client asks for it to spin on top of a pole, the hunt is on to make this restoration fly. But the team gets more than they bargained for when they meet Leonard, a self-proclaimed picking-nerd, who hopes to score a job at the shop.
102	3	"The Reject and the Eject"	January 14, 2014
A 1970s Popcorn Machine rolls in for an old-timey tune up. But when Rick hands the project off to Brettly, it looks like this snack cart might go stale. Then, the crew buckles up for a wild ride when an ejection seat from a 1950s F106 fighter jet lands at the shop.
103	4	"Restoration Wipe-Out"	January 14, 2014
When a 1970s Wet Bike, an early version of a jet-ski, cruises into the shop, the client raises the stakes by offering Rick and Ron a tidy sum if they can ride the restored rig. Can the brothers make it rain or will they wipe out? Also, returning customer Darius brings in an item unlike anything the shop has ever seen: A World War II era bomb.
104	5	"Astro-nuts and Bolts"	January 21, 2014
When a 1964 NASA Jet Pack signed by astronauts Buzz Aldrin and Gene Cernan blasts into the shop, Rick and his team prepare for an out-of-this-world restoration. Later, returning customer Darius brings in an item unlike anything the shop has ever seen: a World War II era bomb.
105	6	"Ameri-cone Dream"	January 21, 2014
When a 1950s Cushman Ice Cream Cart glides into Rick's, the shop digs in for a sweet retro ride. Can Rick transform this fun frozen treat machine or will he leave the client feeling ice cold? Then Leonard, the new picker, takes his first treasure hunting trip with Ron. Can the prot g impress the boss's brother or will the student leave feeling stumped?
106	7	"Pitch Perfect"	January 28, 2014
When a 1960s Electric Mini-Car arrives for a car show quality upgrade, the crew's got the challenge of making this sparky little roadster into a fast and safe ride for the open road. Will this pint-size put-put prove to be a full-size headache? Then, Rick feels the heat when he's asked to throw the first pitch in a LA Dodger's game. Ron tries coaching his big bro, but will Rick's pitch on the mound be a ball or a strike?
107	8	"Search Part-y"	January 28, 2014
When Rick is tasked to repurpose a retro Cigarette Dispenser into a Bike Tool Vending Machine, the wheels are set in motion for a pedal-to-the-metal project. Then, Tyler steps in for Rick to bid on rare 1950s Pedal Bulldozer project. Can they rise to the challenge and give this pile of parts a pick-me-up?
108	9	"Shocks, Locks, and Clocks"	February 4, 2014
Rick feels a jolt of panic when an early 1900s Electro-Shock Alarm Clock arrives in need of hard-to-find parts. Can Leonard the picker, expert in things weird and scientific, save the day on this creepy contraption? Later, the shop's got a problem when trying to convert a vintage 1940s Wayne Gas Pump into a polo player's equipment locker.
109	10	"Bed, Bug & Beyond"	February 4, 2014
When a client asks Rick to convert a 1960s Volkswagen Beetle into a child's bed inspired by Herbie the Love Bug, Ron takes Leonard out to search for the perfect punch buggy. Can the crew turn this iconic ride into a piece of fun furniture or will they just bug out? Then, Rick gets more than he bargained for when he lets his straggly-bearded buddy, Caveman, crash in the boneyard.
110	11	"Car Before the Horse"	February 25, 2014
When a client cruises in with a 1962 mini-Corvette to be modeled after his full-size version, Rick looks to turn this tiny ride into racing ragtop. Then, a 1950s coin-operated mustang ride hoofs it into the shop. Can Rick restore this broken down pony into a sleek stallion?
111	12	"Riders of the Storm"	February 25, 2014
When a New Jersey amusement park owner brings a Hurricane Sandy damaged 1920s Haunted House Car to the shop, the pressure is on to restore a piece of history for a recovering community. With the help of Ted and new painter Niko, Rick hopes to help this wreck-on-wheels once again take some spooky spins.
112	13	"Beer Bell-y"	March 4, 2014
When a beat-up 1940s Boxing Bell arrives in Rick's shop, the crew prepares for a rusty rope-a-dope. Can the guys go the distance and fight their way to a knockout restoration? Then, a client brings in a vintage slot machine to be converted into a beer-pouring "Sloterator." Can Rick turn this classic gambling machine into a happy-hour-ready drink dispenser?

=== Season 6 (2014) ===
No. overall	No. in season	Title	Original release date
113	1	"George Clinton: Funky Yeah!"	June 5, 2014
When music legend George Clinton of Parliament Funkadelic arrives with a funked up 1920s Chickering Baby Grand Piano, the team preps for a pitch-perfect project. Can Rick hit the right notes on this classic instrument, or will the project fall flat? Then, when word gets out that P-Funk will put on a concert for the big reveal, Brettly and Tyler try to take charge of the planning. Can they pull off a spectacular show, or will it be a funky flop?
114	2	"Off the Rails"	June 5, 2014
It's full steam ahead when returning customer Mark Bassett brings in a late 1800s Velocipede, sometimes called a railroad hand-car. Can Rick turn this wreck on wheels into a museum-quality marvel or will the project go off the rails? Then, the shop powers up when a 1940s Battery Charger bolts in. Will Rick have the power to give this project a jolt or will the restoration run out of juice?
115	3	"Back to Four Square"	June 12, 2014
When a rare British 1950s Ariel Square-Four motorcycle speeds into the shop, the crew goes full throttle to restore this vintage ride. Can Rick take this broken-down bike and make it road-trip worthy? Then, when Ron and Leonard need lessons on how to use the shop's fork-lifts, Tyler makes them practice using giant excavators. But when the master, macho-man Ron, challenges his 98-pound proteg, Leonard, to a big-rig contest, no one's sure who will be student and who will be teacher.
116	4	"Big Macs and Cool Tracks"	June 12, 2014
When a "Big Mac Jail" from a 1970s McDonald's PlayPlace arrives in the shop, Rick prepares for a fast food facelift. Can this playground piece go from faulty to fresh? Then, a 1950s Calliphone Portable Record Player makes some noise for the crew. Could it be music to Rick's ears or will it be a restoration record scratch?
117	5	"Bond Ambition"	June 19, 2014
When an authentic James Bond Lotus Esprit Submarine Car featured in the film The Spy Who Loved Me rolls into the shop, Rick is faced with one of the most difficult projects of his career. Will this be the one that puts him in over his head? Then, Ron and Tyler look to strike up a deal at an eccentric antique shop and Ron tests his big brother's patience with a foolish flub.
118	6	"Un-Kniev-able"	June 19, 2014
When a BMX stunt rider brings in his 1976 Evel Knievel Junior Roadmaster bicycle, Rick bargains to get a jaw-dropping daredevil performance from the client for a discount on the project. Rick'll have to perform a few tricks of his own if wants to turn this broken-down bike into a show-worthy set of wheels. Then, the crew digs in when a vintage arcade Mighty Mack Crane Game swings into the shop. Can Rick keep his eye on the prize or will the ball get dropped?
119	7	"David Copperfield: Rick Works His Magic"	June 26, 2014
When living legend illusionist David Copperfield calls on the shop to restore two items from his magic museum's collection, it's time to see what tricks Rick has up his sleeve. Can he pull a rabbit out of a hat or will all the hocus-pocus be too much to handle?
120	8	"Sparks Will Fly"	June 26, 2014
Rick wheels and deals when a rare 1963 Simplex Sportsman Shriner's Bike cruises into the shop. Can the shop turn this ramshackle ride into a striking set of wheels? Then, Ron bargains with a local bar to restore their 1913 Mercantile Scale. But when he cuts the price in exchange for a party, will Rick be miffed about the money or pumped to party?
121	9	"Knockout Restoration"	August 20, 2014
When a client looks to restore a vintage arcade Punch-Out Game given to the shop by Rick Harrison, Rick Dale and his guys put up their dukes for a knockout restoration. Then Rick and Tyler make a bet on who'll pack a bigger punch when the job is done. But they might not find out if Rick has to throw in the towel on this heavyweight project.
122	10	"Boys Meet Whirl"	August 20, 2014
Rick tries to "step right up" when a 1940s Tilt-A-Whirl carnival car spins into the shop. Can he take this piece from beat-up and broken down to fairground fantastic? Then, returning customer Big Mike brings in a 1960s Schwinn bicycle as a 60th birthday surprise for his business partner. Can Ron and Leonard successfully search for its hard-to-find seat to make this present pop?
123	11	"NASCAR History 300: Dales of Thunder"	August 27, 2014
Champion driver Kyle Busch and Charlotte Motor Speedway's Marcus Smith call on Rick to create a trophy inspired by NASCAR's past for the History 300 race. But with the event only weeks away, Rick must speed into action to deliver. When Ron hears about the race he reveals a crush on NASCAR driver Danica Patrick and makes it his mission tag along with Rick to the History 300 and win her heart.
124	12	"Tune-in & Tune-up"	August 27, 2014
When a one-of-a-kind quarter-scale model of a 1932 Hudson car arrives in the shop, Rick and the guys put the wheels in motion for a museum-quality makeover. Can they turn this small car into a big deal or will the restoration run out of gas? Then, a 1950s pillow speaker--a radio used by hospitals to play music for bed-ridden patients--arrives looking for a dreamy restoration. Can Rick bring the music back to this sleepy speaker or will the project hit a clunker?
125	13	"Slap-Shots and Stogies"	September 3, 2014
When a broken-down 1950s Table Hockey Game slides into the shop, Rick takes a shot at taking this toy from the sidelines back into play. Then, the shop goes all in on an antique 1910s Slot Machine which once paid out cigars instead of cash. Can the guys take this gambling gadget and make it a showpiece, or will the restoration go up in smoke?

=== Season 7 (2016) ===
No. overall	No. in season	Title	Original release date
126	1	"Under Fire"	January 1, 2016
The pressure is on for Bodie when the biggest restoration of his career flames out. Meanwhile, Dale’s routine tune-up on a 1946 Harley turns into a full blown over-haul. Then, the Monkey Business team runs into a hairy situation when a customer brings in a family relic from the late 1800s.
127	2	"Wrestling with the Past"	January 8, 2016
At Wheels Through Time, Dale is tasked with bringing a mysterious 104-year-old motorcycle back to life. In New York, Steve’s Restorations grapples with a rare vintage arm wrestling arcade game from the 1980s while the guys at Bodie Stroud Industries retrofit a 1950s gas pump for a surprising new purpose.
128	3	"Rust-o-mod"	January 15, 2016
Steve’s Restorations takes on the challenge of restoring a client’s rust bucket 1972 Gran Torino into a unique one of a kind machine while Bodie Stroud Industries attempts to bring new life into a bullet nose Studebaker. Then, in Georgia, Bob’s Garage brings back a family’s cherished 1959 hi-fi stereo.
129	4	"Pickup the Pieces"	January 29, 2016
In LA, Bodie fixes up a 1959 Ford F100 in hopes of flipping it to an exacting Ford truck aficionado. Meanwhile in Michigan, Andy takes an emotional ride restoring a 1940s JC Higgins bike, and Bob's Garage resurrects a buried 1930s gas pump.
130	5	"Up Against the Wall"	February 5, 2016
At Wheels Through Time, Dale is racing to bring a 90-year-old Indian motorcycle back to life to perform on the infamous traveling motorcycle stunt show, the Wall of Death. Meanwhile in New York, Steve finds himself in the dark during the restoration of a vintage neon sign. Later, trouble brews while Bodie attempts to transform a 1950s cola dispenser into a modernized beer keg refrigerator.
131	6	"Three Wheeled Thunder"	February 10, 2016
In LA, Bodie is commissioned to restore a very rare 1948 Davis Divan for the grand reopening of the Petersen Automotive Museum. Meanwhile, Monkey Business tries to turn a '50s carnival tank into a go-cart for a motorcycle group and Bob's garage jumps on to restoring a '70s gas powered toy.
132	7	"Mr. Lucky"	February 19, 2016
Andy gets to work on a bizarre kit car that's part VW bug, part Delorean and part motorcycle. And later, Bodie rectifies with another project from the Petersen Museum, an early 1900s electric car charger, and Dale builds a custom Harley for a customer looking to connect to his past.
133	8	"Here Comes The Judge"	February 26, 2016
Bodie is put to the trial to restore a very rare 1970 GTO "Judge" in one month's time for the SEMA car show. Meanwhile, Andy modernizes a spark plug cleaner into a stereo for a long time friend and Steve hatches a plan to transform a beat up 64 Ford Falcon into a work of art.
134	9	"Let the Good Times Roll"	March 4, 2016
Steve works his magic on a unique but worn-out Roller Skate Car from the 70s, for the owner of a local rink. Meanwhile, Dale helps the owner of American Iron magazine restore a rare 1929 Harley Davidson JDH and Bodie tries fix a 1930s Penny Scale for a local soda shop.
135	10	"Basket Case"	March 11, 2016
Dale finds the engine from a super rare 1940 Harley-Davidson WLD in a box of seemingly random parts and is tasked with trying to put the puzzle back together. Meanwhile, Steve turns a 1959 Cadillac tailfin into a custom couch for a Cadillac fanatic and Bodie and his team restore a 1963 Ford Galaxie back to its former "race code" glory.
136	11	"Order Up"	March 18, 2016
Bodie takes on the juicy restoration of a 1941 Plymouth Special Deluxe for the CEO of Carl's Jr. Meanwhile Dale is in a rush to build in time for his museums annual motorcycle raffle and Andy restores a 1952 Shuffle Bowler game.
137	12	"Taking the Reins"	March 25, 2016
Steve gets cooking on transforming a rusted-out 1956 Willys truck into a BBQ kitchen-on-wheels. Meanwhile, Bodie and his son turn a mini-Divco "milk truck" kiddie car from the 1960s into a souped-up go-kart and Bob is champing at the bit to restore a 1952 Bally's coin operated horse ride.
138	13	"Pony Up"	April 1, 2016
Bodie does a custom restoration on a 1967 Ford "Eleanor" Mustang, for Imagine Dragons lead singer Dan Reynolds. Meanwhile, Dale has his hands full trying to get a rare 1936 Crocker motorcycle to run and Steve restores a 1924 Isotta Fraschini Type 8A for a long time friend and customer.
