= WindowsWear =

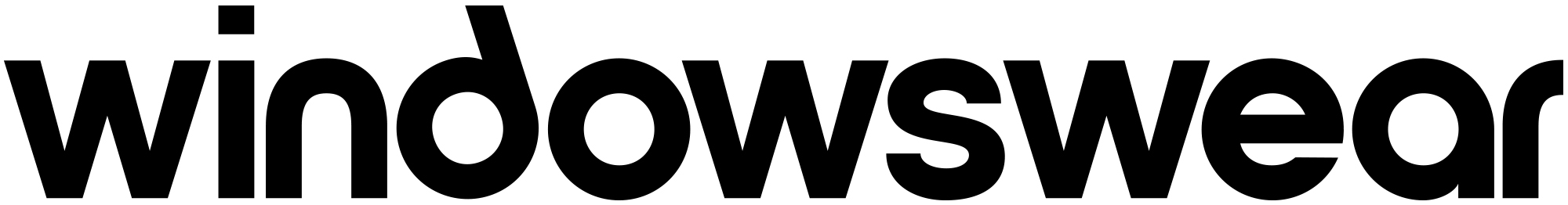
- Industry: Retail and Technology
- Headquarters: New York City, New York
- Key people: Jon Harari, CEO; Michael Niemtzow, Co-Founder & President; Raul Tovar, Co-Founder & Head of Photography; Joline Mujica, Head of Trends & Tours
- Website: www.WindowsWear.com

WindowsWear is a retail visual merchandising database and community, founded in 2012 and headquartered in New York City. WindowsWear is a current and archival collection of retail and visual displays dating back to 1931. The collection provides retailers, designers, brands and creative professionals with photos for competitive research, inspiration and trend ideas over the years as they look to create visuals for today's retail environments. At Berkeley College's Manhattan campus, WindowsWear has a museum called the WindowsWear Museum, featuring fashion windows and in-store displays. The company also offers window display tours in New York City, an annual awards event for retailers, and workshops covering visual merchandising, store design, trends, and concepts.

== History ==
WindowsWear was founded by Jon Harari, Michael Niemtzow, former colleagues at Lehman Brothers, and Raul Tovar. The team includes photographers stationed in various countries and cities. WindowsWear launched its company in November 2012, with Elle as a launch partner. WindowsWear has funding from investors at companies such as Goldman Sachs, Barclays Capital, Coach, Inc., eBay, and Nomura Securities.

== Users ==
WindowsWear is used by retailers, designers and universities such as The University of Alabama, Berkeley College, EBC Hochschule, FIT, Genesee College, George Brown, Laboratory Institute of Merchandising, The Planning and Visual Educational Partnership, Milwaukee Area Technical College, Seneca College, Sheridan College and Université du Québec à Montréal.
