= Endcap =

Variety of retail product display

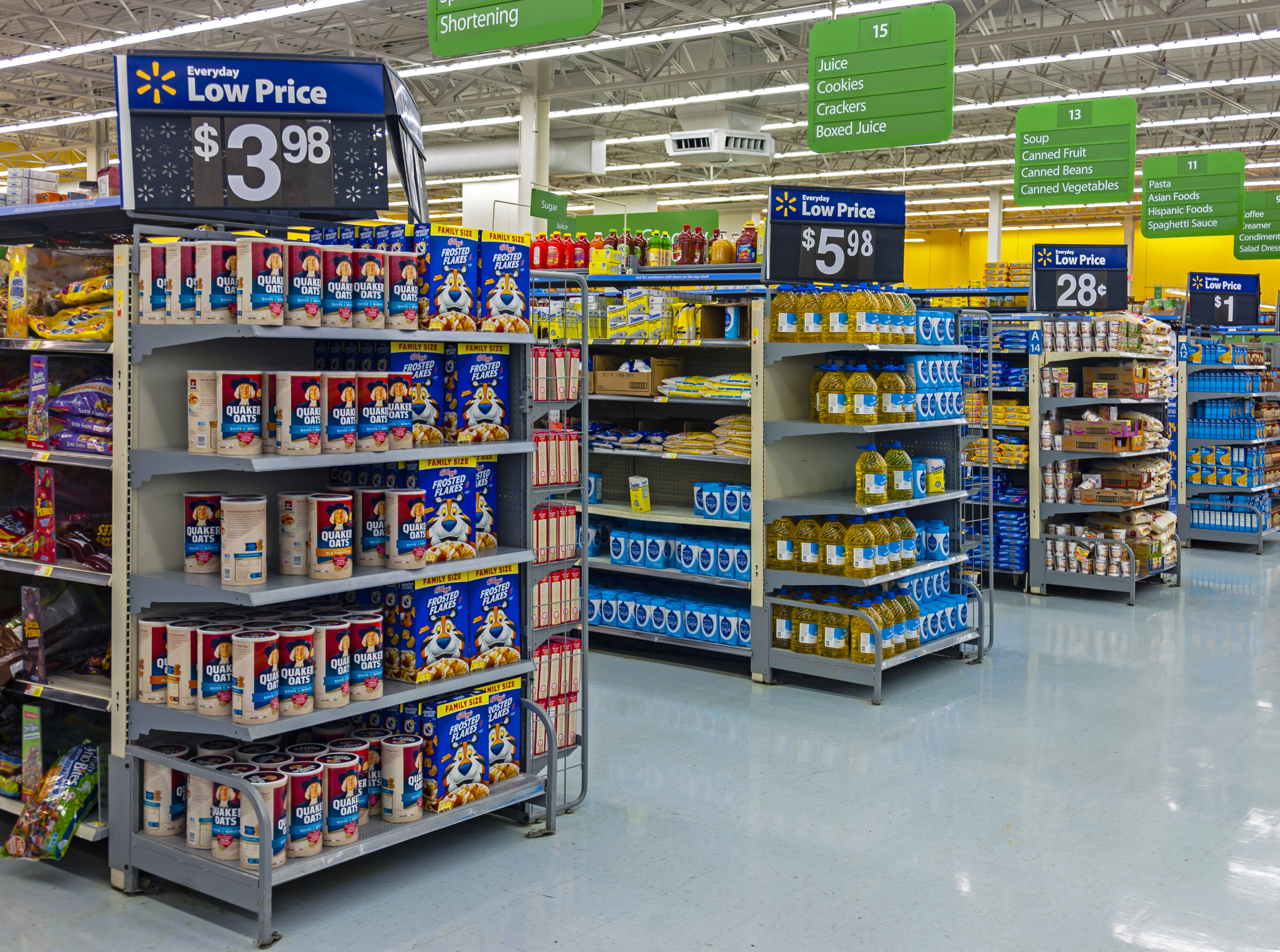
Endcaps at a Walmart store

In retail marketing, an endcap, end cap, free-standing display unit (FSDU), or gen-end (general end shelving) is a display for a product placed at the end of an aisle. It is perceived to give a brand a competitive advantage. It is often available for lease to a manufacturer in a retail environment. Products placed on an endcap for sale will sell at a much faster pace than products not on the endcap. The display of products on the endcap is sometimes also called a feature.

== Promotional shelves and retail fixtures ==
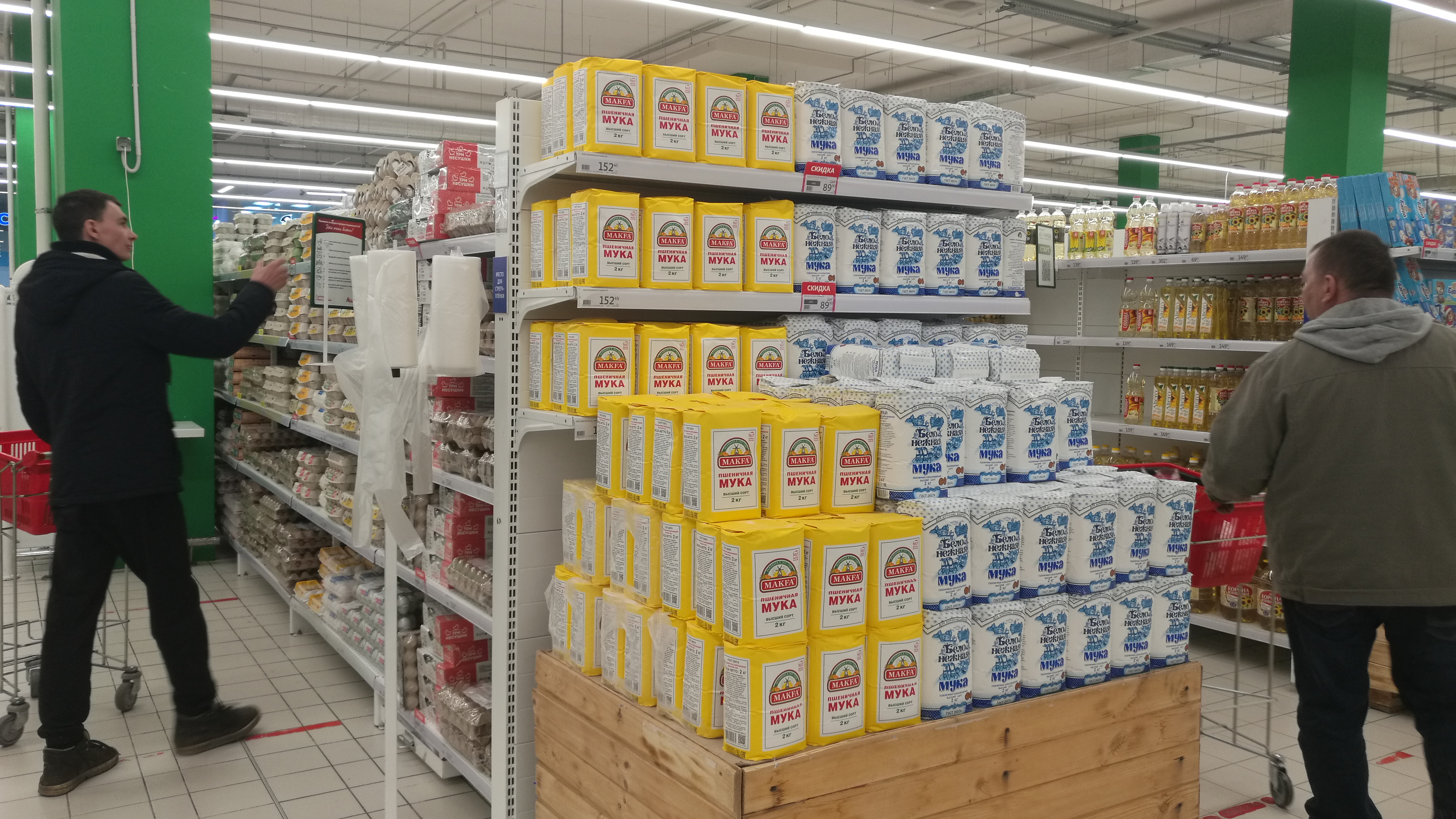
Bags of flour on end cap

In addition to products displayed on the end of an aisle, promoted space on a retail shelf can be referred to as a fixture. Companies will oftentimes purchase a smaller amount of shelf space before making the move to an endcap at the end of an aisle.

== Construction ==
End caps are often built into the shelving or racks of the retail aisle system. Other retailers have an open space at the end of the aisle; an end cap is placed in that space, often on a pallet. Several design options are available.

Some endcaps are refrigerated. Most endcaps are made of printed corrugated fiberboard; corrugated FSDUs are readily recyclable. Corrugated plastic is also used. Many endcaps and point of purchase displays are assembled by contract packagers.

== See also ==
- Gondola (retail)
- Visual merchandising
- Display stand
