= Visual merchandising =

Marketing technique emphasizing 3D model displays

Visual merchandising is the practice in the retail industry of optimizing the presentation of products and services to better highlight their features and benefits. The purpose of such visual merchandising is to attract, engage, and motivate the customer towards making a purchase.

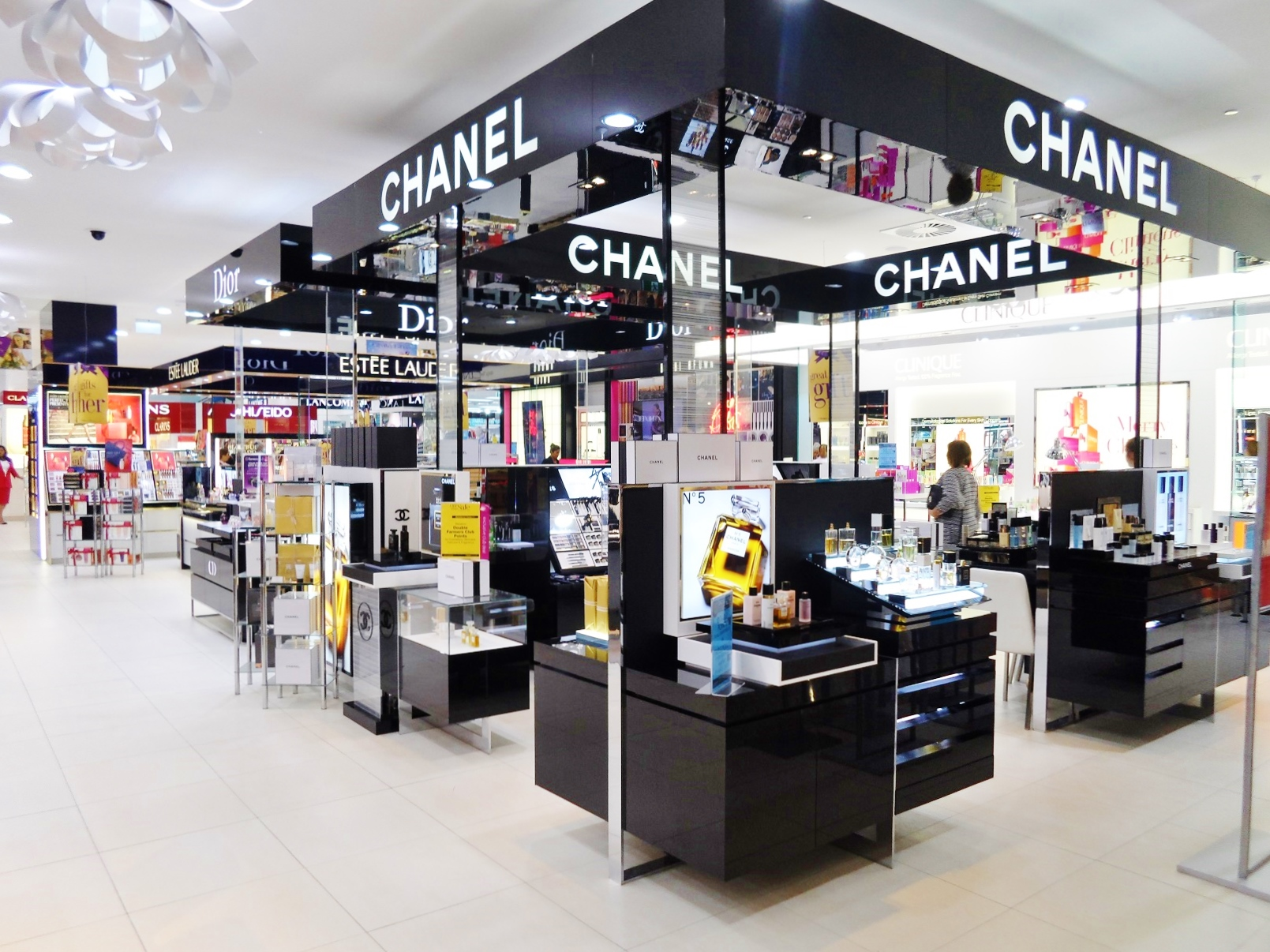
Effective display of cosmetics help create an image of luxury

Visual merchandising traditionally occurs in brick and mortar stores using a blend of lighting, color combinations, and articles of decor to stimulate an observer and generate interest.

== History ==
When giant 19th century dry goods establishments like Marshall Field & Co. shifted their business from wholesale to retail, the visual display of goods became necessary to attract consumers. Store windows were often used to attractively display the store's merchandise. Over time, the design aesthetic used in window displays moved indoors and became part of the overall interior store design, eventually reducing the use of display windows in many suburban malls.

In the 20th century, well-known artists such as Salvador Dalí and Andy Warhol created window displays.

In the beginning of 21st century, visual merchandising was becoming a science. Currently, visual merchandising has become a major tool of business promotion which is widely used to attract customers and increase sales.

WindowsWear is a community and database of visual merchandising from around the world.

== Contribution to retail brand strategy ==
Visual merchandising contributes to a brand's personality and the characteristics associated with the brand. The design of the store should reflect this as part of their retail brand strategy. This includes the in-store environment and brand communications used, such as signage and images displayed in-store. These visual elements play a part in building a retail brand and therefore they help a brand differentiate itself from its competitors, create brand loyalty, and allows for a brand to place premium pricing on their products. Part of the brand strategy used in visual merchandising is research into the brand's target market to find out what their customers' values and self-images are. This information can allow the retailer to cater the design of a store and their advertising to match their consumers.

== Methodology ==
=== Techniques ===
Visual merchandising supports retail sales by creating an environment for the customer. It supports company growth and profit by educating the customer through strategic product placement that highlights and reinforces the brand image. Detail is retail.

For retailers to gain a competitive advantage in the marketplace, visual merchandising is an important factor and an effective way of adding value to their brand. Visual merchandising communicates with customers through elements that stimulate their senses, such as lighting, music, aromas, and television screens. The environment in which a consumer is in can influence the purchasing decisions they make. Research shows that stores that do not communicate well with their customers, such as the retail store having a poor layout, can cause customers to incur psychic costs, and may lead to customers being deterred from shopping again as overall shopping pleasure has been reduced. The physical environment is a primary objective in communicating with customers in retail. Research from Thaler shows that consumers are more willing to pay a higher price for a product if the product is purchased in a more favourable environment. This makes customers become more accepting of the higher price, rather than if it were to be sold in an old rundown store. Customers can form an important bias of the merchandise quality based on the retail store design environment, and even factors such as employee's interpersonal skills and how they are treated.

Visual merchandising builds upon or augments the retail design of a store. It is one of the final stages in setting out a store in a way customers find attractive and appealing.

Many elements can be used by visual merchandisers in creating displays including color, lighting, space, product information, sensory inputs (such as smell, touch, and sound), as well as technologies such as digital displays and interactive installations.

Store design consists of mainly two techniques: interior and exterior displays, also known as in-store design and window design. The goal of these two techniques is to attract the attention of consumers, entice them into the store, to keep them in the store as long as possible, and influence purchasing decisions. A recent study has found that these two techniques have the greatest effect on impulse buying; therefore, they are important aspects for the retailer. In-store design and window display techniques can be used to enhance the store environment, influencing consumer behaviour and purchasing decisions. In-store design is a technique, which can be used to enhance the atmosphere of the store and the overall store environment. Having a visually appealing store design can simulate the representation of the brand and attract customers. Efficient, customer-friendly environment makes shopping easier for consumers, which encourages buying and, most importantly, reassures repeat purchasing. The window design technique is a method of communicating with customers, which uses a combination of lighting, colours, props, text, and graphic design to display goods, attract the attention of the customer, and sustain a brand image. The overall goal of the window display for the retailer is to entice the customer to enter the store and motivate purchasing.

==== Interior displays ====
In-store visual merchandising can be used to capture the attention of consumers while they are in the store, an essential component in the buying decision-making process. To capture the attention of the customer, the retailer must lookout the customer's needs during this process. Factors that contribute to the overall in-store design include the store layout, store design, point of purchases displays, item display, assortment display, and signage. When applied successfully to a store, these factors can meet the needs of the consumer and provide a positive in-store purchasing environment.

==== Store layout ====
The layout of a store is a significant factor for the maintenance of a thriving business, which can help advance sales and profitability. An effective store layout encourages consumers to shop the entire store and view an extensive assortment of merchandise. The most common forms of store layouts include grid layout, racetrack layout and free form layout. Choosing a store layout depends on the type of store and the nature of the product sold. A grid layout is generally organized in a rectangular shape, which allows customers to shop quickly and maximize shop floor space, ideal for a supermarket or hardware store. A racetrack layout ensures that the consumer only follows one path when browsing the store. This is beneficial in the sense that the consumer will come into contact with every product on the shelf. However, this can irritate customers. Customers may feel that they are being forced to follow a certain path, and can be frustrating when trying to make a quick purchase. Free form layout is a suitable layout for a store that encourages browsing. This type of layout is more relaxed in its structure, which leaves the customer feeling less rushed. The entrance of the store, otherwise known as the transition zone, is an important area in the store. The term "transition zone" was first coined by retail anthropologist Paco Underhill. This is an area where all shoppers pass on entry into store, and is significant as this zone is where consumers can observe the stimuli and sense the general vibe of the store. Therefore, thoughts and representations a consumer has about the store and the brand depend on this area. When customers enter the transition zone they need time to adjust to the new environment including the lighting, the temperature and other sights and sounds. Higher profit margin items are not recommended to be placed in that area because customers do not notice it while they are preoccupied with adjusting to the new environmental stimuli. Spatial design of a retail store is a key aspect when it comes to creating an enjoyable experience, and is also an effective way of communicating with customers. Colour can be considered one of the most important variables when it comes to ambiance in retail. (Van Rom pay, Tania-Dijkstra, Verhoeven, & van Es, 2011). Certain colours that can be considered highly arousing can encourage customers to make purchases out of impulse. Warm colors such and orange, red, and yellow give consumers a sense of excitement, but also provide a sense of anxiety and create a distraction. Recreational shoppers that enjoy a sense of excitement may prefer these high arousal colors. (Van Rompay et al.,. 2011). In general, people prefer cool colours such as green and blue and associate these colours with a sense of calmness and security. Shoppers that are more task oriented are more likely to prefer these cool colours as they bring this calming effect and are also less likely to distract them from the task at hand. The way the furniture such as shelves and racks and seating are set up is a tangible element in store design. A store layout with a higher regard for space can increase customer pleasure, and a store filled with clutter can have the opposite effect. (Van Rompay et al.,. 2011). When It comes to a simple well-spaced layout in a store, task oriented customers find this type of layout to be the most effective, as they can easily locate the items they want without the unnecessary clutter and obstacles in their way. These simple factors can encourage customers to stay in the store longer and in turn spend more. (Van Rompay et al.,. 2011).

==== Mannequins ====
Mannequins are used by apparel retailers to display their products in-store and in the window display. They are a tool used to show consumers what their products look like on a person. The mannequins will commonly be styled to match trends as well display the latest products available. A study found that retailers projected an ideal image to consumers with the size and proportions of the mannequins. This is used to further reinforce the characteristics of their target market. However, consumers found the size of mannequins to be unrealistic but would give a favorable response to the mannequins when they were headless. This was because the participants in the study found the faces of the mannequins unrealistic and could not relate to them. Therefore, it is important for retailers to understand the thoughts and opinions of consumers on visual stimuli such as mannequins so they can create a more desirable shopping environment for the consumers.

==== Point of purchase display ====
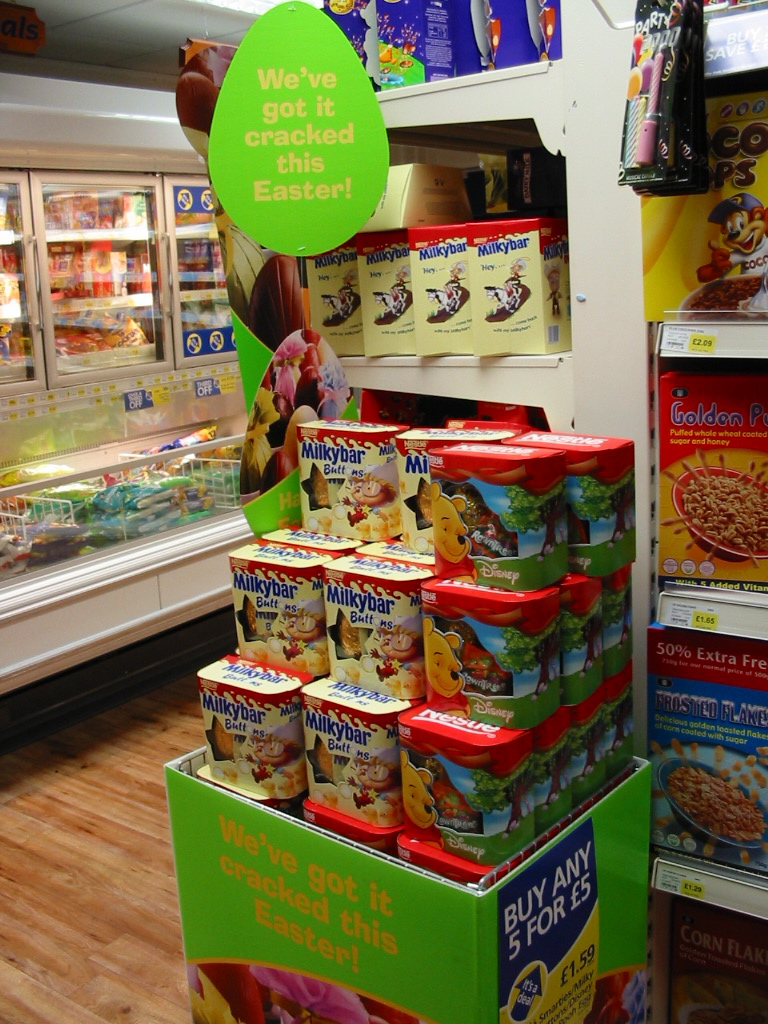
Endcap at the end of a retail aisle

Merchandise must be visible, easy to access, and there must be a range of merchandise to choose from. Having visible merchandise is essential for retailers as consumers not only "buy what they see" but are also able to tangibly engage with the physical product. This creates an emotional connection, which can drive the customer to purchase the product. The physical positioning of the product also increases visibility. Products at eye level also get more attention. "Eye level is buy level". Considering these elements when merchandising gives the customer a sense of freedom of choice. "Less is more" is a key principle in visual merchandising. Although having a wide variety of stock and product options is important for consumers, it is also important not to overwhelm the consumer. Having too many choices can be confusing to consumers and that phenomenon is referred to as the "tyranny of choice". Arranging stock so it is not overcrowded, and limiting the amount of merchandise on the shop floor, are important aspects of merchandising. Over-crowded stores can create a sense of stress and anxiety, which does not encourage the consumer to shop the entire store.

A limited product selection can make the purchasing decision easier. In a study done at a high end supermarket in California by psychologist Sheena Iyengar and Mark Lepper, there were two tables of jam samples, one with 24 flavors and the other with 6 flavors. More shoppers were attracted to the booth with the larger selection, 60%, as opposed to 40% being attracted to the smaller selection, but the sales that resulted from that were surprising. Only 3% bought from the larger selection and 30% from the smaller suggestion.

==== Bundling ====
Bundling is promoting objects that work together as a set. It inspires people how to use the products in their lives and also makes complementary product suggestions. In a fashion retail store, complete outfits on a mannequin or the placement of tops beside jackets and bags by other accessories such as scarves and jewelry are an example of bundling. The store has already done work in envisioning the look the items can used to achieve. Bundling also directs attention to specific products thereby limiting the product selection presented.

==== Atmospherics ====
The atmospherics also have a large influence on the store environment. Atmospherics should all coordinate with each other to create a consistent ambience and positively influence the consumer's shopping experience and buying decision-making process. Visuals such as light and display are not always enough to enhance the overall ambience of the store, and retain customer attention; therefore, other elements such as music and scents can be used.

==== Light ====
Light can be used in many ways in retail stores, from highlighting an object or area of a store to simply illuminate the entire store. Bright light can create a sense of honesty, positivity, and can promote impulse purchasing. Lighting can also be used to highlight the store layout and urge customers to flow through the store, exposing them to more merchandise. The level of brightness in the store is a very important factor in consumer behavior and the retail environment, as rooms that have dim lighting are less arousing than more brightly lit spaces. (Areni, 1994). Lighting can influence the customer's decision making, behavior, and also the overall spatial environment as lighting and ambiance are connected. Customers become more stimulated when the lighting in the room is considered to be very bright and speeds up the pace at which customers purchase products. Markin recommended that to slow customers' shopping pace, the merchandiser should adopt a softer lighting technique which will increase the amount of time customers spend in the store. (Areni, 1994). The result of this is a possible increase in the amount of merchandise the stores customer's purchase. This shows us that the differing levels of in store lighting can directly affect the amount of time consumers spend in the store. (Areni, 1994).

The lighting inside a retail store can be used strategically to highlight products on display or to create a comfortable environment for consumers. It is an important element used (alongside music, temperature, fragrance, and layout) in retail to create an atmosphere that matches with the brand's personality. Atmosphere of a retail store is significant as it was found that the mood of a customer will affect their buying behavior. A retailer can use soft lighting to create a calm and peaceful atmosphere for the customer or bright lighting to represent a fun and vibrant feeling associated with the brand. The strategic use of light can change the mood of a consumer and affect their subconscious mind during their shopping experience within a retail store. A retail store with a soft ambiance and bright lights highlighting certain products will drive the customer towards these products and motivate them to make a purchase.

==== Music ====
The music played within a store can promote a brand's image, and can also aid consumers in making purchase decisions. Music that suits the style of the store and the target audience is an important factor to consider. Music with a slow tempo can cause the consumer to relax; therefore, they spend more time in the store. This leads to more contact with merchandise and increased purchasing. Having music, which is popular within the target market, can also encourage consumers to linger in the store longer. For example, a store with a teenage target market should consider playing pop music, as this is a genre that a younger audience commonly enjoys. Playing this genre will make their shopping experience more enjoyable, which can result in them staying longer in the store, exposing them to more merchandise, and influencing possible purchasing decisions.

==== Scent ====
Having a unique scent in a store can differentiate the brand from others. When customers smell that scent outside of the store, this will trigger their senses and remind them of that brand and its products. Scents can also trigger emotional responses for example,

- Lavender, basil, cinnamon orange– relaxing, soothing, calming, and reduces anxiety
- Peppermint, thyme, rosemary, grapefruit, eucalyptus – enterprising, stimulating, increases arousal and productivity
- Ginger, chocolate, cardamom, liquorice – romance
- Vanilla – comforting and calming
- Black pepper – sexually stimulating

Distributing scents throughout the store such as vanilla, lavender, thyme, rosemary, grapefruit, and eucalyptus can be advantageous for the retailer. These scents calm, soothe, and comfort, therefore, stimulating the consumer to loiter in the store, leading to increased merchandise awareness and increased impulse purchasing.

==== Exterior displays ====
Exterior window displays can be used to sell product and entice customers into the store. An eye-catching window display can promote the brand image. Windows can give consumers and by-passers understanding as to what goods are sold in store. They are also an effective way of promoting fashion trends and providing useful information to the target audience.

===== Window display =====
Visual merchandising is a multi-sensory tool used by retailers to catch the attention of customers and attract them into a store to make a purchase. The first piece of visual merchandising customers encounter with a brand is the window display. Window displays are used as an initial attraction to bring customers into a store and are also used as a marketing tool to communicate the brand's image to the consumers as well as to distinguish itself from its competitors.

Window displays allows consumers to generate interest or impression for a brand. Window displays allow consumers to figure out the quality and character of the products the brand has to offer, generating more sales.

A study in Nottingham, England of the pharmacy and beauty retailer Boots, has found that products introduced in a window display increases the sales of those products and help with increasing the sales of products which have low sales. Overall, stores who had a window display had a positive increase in sales compared to those who did not.

===== Colour =====
Colour is a powerful tool in exterior displays. It can aid creativity for exterior window displays and can have a unique effect on the consumer. The use of color can create atmosphere, grab the attention of by-passers, and attract them to the store. Different colors can trigger different emotional responses. For example, blue can trigger a calm response, green and brown can promote restfulness, warm colours such as red, orange and yellow can initiate exciting, cheerful, friendly, vibrant, simulating reactions, purple can give the impression of elegance and sophistication, while grey colours can give off a depressing, dull feel. Using colors that associate with a certain product or brand representation is also a useful technique when planning window displays. For example, using neutral colors such as green and brown when promoting environmentally friendly products is favorable, as they give off an earthy, relaxing effect; therefore, the consumer perceives those products as environmentally friendly.

Colour is a significant tool used in visual merchandising. It can be used to influence the behavior of consumers and evoke different reactions. Each color can make consumers feel a different emotion, and therefore, retailers will use colors selectively to help consumers make associations about their products on display. Bright and warm colors such as red and yellow can be used to attract attention as well as excite the viewer. Cooler colors such a blue and green gives a calm and tranquil response to the viewer while purple gives the feeling of sophistication and elegance. A mixture of colors to create a contrasting background to the products on display can have a high recall rate by consumers. International retailers need to be wise on their choice of colors used in visual merchandising as colors take a different meaning in different countries. For example, red is seen as a color of luck and good fortune in many Asian countries while it represents danger and excitement in Western countries. Therefore, global retailers are not able to use one set of colors for their visual merchandising across all their stores around the world, opting instead to adjust colors according to local cultures and consumer habits.

===== Graphics, photography and signage =====
The use of graphics and photography in window displays is an effective way of communicating information to the consumer. The most common form of communication in window displays is through text and signage, especially when advertising a sale or a special. This technique is commonly directed towards price-driven customers who are constantly seeking bargains. Colorful, bold text and graphics are used to grasp the attention of these consumers. Signage should communicate a short, clear message, which is consistent with the brand's marketing communications model. Visually, signage should be appealing to the eye and easy to read. One effective way of using signage in windows is using a self-adhesive vinyl cutout to the window. Small signs in the window can also be used to communicate the price of a good or the discount. Photography can be used in a window display to enhance the theme of window or reinforce the brand's advertising campaigns.

===== Lighting =====
Lighting is another technique which can be used to enhance window displays. Lighting can be used to highlight certain products, and create dimension and set the mood for the window display. It is a successful tool as it can not only be used to highlight product during the day, but at night also. The brightness and colours of lighting can be adjusted to suit the mood of the display. Once again, different colours trigger different emotions and therefore create different moods.

===== Seasonal displays =====
Adjusting window displays based on seasonal events, calendar dates, and consumerism-based holidays such as Christmas, Valentine's Day, and Father's Day can be a useful approach to encouraging consumer purchasing. Choosing products that suit the season to display in the window can remind consumers to purchase gifts and provide gift ideas for the particular holiday.

===== Fashion trends =====
Window displays can be used to set trends. Hence window display designers must always be one step ahead of trends and predict future fashion movements. The merchandise must be able to direct these trends to the target audience, and be able to communicate them in a way the audience is able to understand. Clothing must be styled on mannequins appropriately with popular clothing to draw consumer attention to the store.

=== Planogram ===
A floor map helps visual merchandisers to find the best place for garments, according to the color stories of clothes and footwear in the shop. It is a kind of floor plan with merchandise marked. Another valuable tool is a planogram, to determine the visual look of the store's flow.

== Forms ==
=== Window displays ===
Window displays can communicate style, content, and price.

Window displays are often used by stores to entice customers into the store. Store visual merchandisers will dress the window in current season trends - often including fully dressed mannequins as well as accessories on plinths or hanging from special display equipment.

A study in 2002 (Sen et al., 2002) found that clothing retailers will have the most success enticing their customers into their store by focusing on communicating current fashion trends and styling suggesting and ensure that they have a strong store image portrayed in the window display. Sen et al.'s study was an in-depth analysis of the various factors of window displays, and its findings argue that styling and display of clothing, instead of atmospherics, play a large part in consumer behavior and purchasing.

Display windows may also be used to advertise seasonal sales or to inform passers-by of other current promotions.

=== Food merchandising ===
Restaurants, grocery stores, convenience stores, etc. use visual merchandising as a tool to differentiate themselves in a saturated market.

== See also ==
- Display stand
- WindowsWear
- Facing (retail)
