= American Restoration =

American reality television series

Coordinates: 36°15′17″N 115°13′34″W

- Also known as: Kings of Restoration (Outside the US & Canada)
- Genre: Reality television
- Directed by: Jairus Cobb; Guy Fiorita; Rennik Soholt
- Starring: Rick Dale; Tyler Dale; Brettly Otterman; Bodie Stroud; Dale Walksler; Andy Bowman Jr.; Steve Hale; Bob Halliday; Kowboy aka Kevin Lowery
- Composers: Extreme Music; Music Box; Strike Audio
- Country of origin: United States
- Original language: English
- No. of seasons: 7
- No. of episodes: 138 (list of episodes)

Production
- Executive producers: Brent Montgomery; Colby Gaines
- Producers: Ryan Miller; Sean Moran; Christopher Williams
- Editors: Adam Pomata; George Sinfield; Scott Speed; Luke Spencer
- Running time: 24 minutes
- Production company: Leftfield Pictures

Original release
- Network: History
- Release: October 25, 2010 – April 1, 2016

Related
- Pawn Stars

American Restoration is an American reality television series airing on the History Channel. Produced by Leftfield Pictures, the first six seasons were recorded in Las Vegas, Nevada, where it chronicled the daily activities at Rick's Restorations, an antique restoration shop, with its owner Rick Dale, his staff, and teenage son, as they restore various vintage items to their original condition.

For season 7, History rebooted the program with a new concept and cast, with the series now following five American restoration shops.

The show is the first spin-off of Pawn Stars, in which Dale has appeared several times as an on-camera expert and restored various items. (Note: Episodes of Pawn Stars in which Dale has appeared include "Time Machines" (Episode 1.8), "Rick's Big Bet" (Episode 1.10), "A Shot and a Shave" (Episode 2.4), "Wheels" (Episode 2.12), "Off the Wagon" (Episode 2.21), "Bumpy Ride" (Episode 2.26), "Hell Week" (Episode 2.29), "The British Are Coming" (Episode 2.31), "Trail Breaker" (Episode 3.1) and "Deals from Hell" (Episode 3.6)) The series has featured cameo appearances by the cast of Pawn Stars, American Pickers, Counting Cars, illusionists Lance Burton and David Copperfield, NASCAR driver Greg Biffle, and musicians Sammy Hagar, Billy Joel, and Jason Mraz.

== Format ==
=== Seasons 1–6 ===
The series focuses on Rick's Restorations, a company owned and operated by Las Vegas area metal artist and antique restoration expert Rick Dale, who has been restoring various vintage items for almost 30 years. Dale and his company first appeared on the History reality television series Pawn Stars, in that show's first-season episode "Time Machines," and in nine subsequent episodes in which he restored numerous decades-old items for the Harrisons (owners of the Gold and Silver Pawn Shop where Pawn Stars takes place), including vending machines, gas pumps, barber chairs, motorcycles, and jukeboxes.

Beginning with the June 6, 2012 episode ("Dirt Bike Duels"), a new feature, "Rick's Tips", was added preceding the second commercial break, in which Rick poses a question related to restoration, similar to the trivia question feature on Pawn Stars.

According to Dale, his shop typically works on 6 – 12 projects at any given time. Although he and his staff restore the items brought in by customers themselves, they are shown consulting other merchants and experts for parts, and calling in freelance employees, such as Bob, a metalworker, when their workload requires it. In addition to items brought in by customers, Dale will also purchase items himself to restore from pickers, such as the toy train he purchases in "Buttered Up." The range of services offered by Rick's Restorations is limited by financial concerns. Although Dale has a positive view of his staff's abilities, he observes that they are sometimes difficult to manage, in particular his younger brother, Ron.

=== Season 7 ===
Premiering on January 1, 2016, these episodes of American Restoration featured projects helmed by Bodie Stroud, Dale Walksler, Andy Bowman Jr., Steve Hale, and Bob Halliday, who own five separate restoration shops around the country.

== Cast ==
=== Seasons 1–6 ===
- Rick Dale – Metal artist, antique restoration expert, and owner of Rick's Restorations. Rick Harrison of Pawn Stars, who is one of Dale's top customers, has praised Dale's work by calling him "a certified miracle worker".
- Tyler Dale – Rick's teenage son, who has worked with him in the shop since age two. Rick has opined that Tyler is sometimes lazy, which worries Rick, who wishes Tyler to take over the shop one day. Rick states in the premiere that although Tyler has been improving, he still has much to learn. The hair on left side of his head is dyed blonde, while the right side is his natural brown color. In the episode "Tyler's Promotion", he was promoted to Shop Foreman, which was welcomed with mixed reactions from the rest of the crew.
- Ron Dale – Rick's younger brother, who works primarily as a picker. Rick feels his brother is the hardest of his employees to manage. Ron, who says his life is "relaxed [and] easy-paced", takes his time in his work. When going to get an item cleaned away from the shop in "Ice Cold", he and Tyler take lunch, even though Tyler informs that the staff generally does not do so, which Ron says is one of the "perks" of being out with him. Tyler remarks that this explains why it takes Ron three hours to go to the hardware store. Rick worries that Tyler, who looks up to Ron, and enjoys going out on jobs with him, will pick up Ron's bad habits. Ron first appeared in the Pawn Stars episode "Time Machines", in which he sells an old Coke machine to Rick Harrison, who then sends it to Rick Dale, Ron's brother, to be restored.
- Kowboy aka Kevin Lowery – Employee who does the metal polishing in the shop. Rick describes Kowboy as "the grumpiest bastard I've ever met," saying, "He would have a bad thing to say about a bonus". He used to do all the polishing and woodworking in the shop, but his duties expanded over the years.
- Brettly Otterman – Rick's stepson and Tyler's stepbrother, he provides comic relief as the bumbling "village idiot". Rick describes Brettly as the "low man on the totem pole", who is delegated the most tedious tasks, such as sandblasting old rust and paint from items, or disposing of beehives. Because of his perceived ineptitude, Ron refers to sodablasting, which presents no danger of damaging restored items, as "Brettly-proof." In later seasons Brettly actually proves to be a good picker, in one episode, impresses Rick with his skills as a one-time auctioneer.
- Ted Hague – A lettering artist with 25 years of experience hand-painting items, and owner of Letter Perfect Incorporated, a Las Vegas-based signage and design firm.
- Kyle Astorga – Kyle is in charge of reassembling disassembled projects and applying finishing touches. He is good friends with Kowboy, whom he drives to work every day, and is described by History.com as "one of the most skillful and loyal workers at the shop."
- Kelly Dale (née Mayer) – Rick's wife, Tyler's stepmother and Brettly's mother, she handles the business side of the shop such as payroll, maintaining budgets, ordering parts, and customer relations. She is also the woman featured in the Rick's Restorations logo. In the third-season episode "Hot & Salty", Rick proposes to her, and they subsequently marry.
- Chris – the master in do-it-all. He can do anything in the shop. Often in conflict with Kowboy which usually results in humiliation for Kowboy.
- Niko – One of the newest guys in the shop. He is currently one of the shop's painters.
- Dave - Does some of Kowboy's old duties.
- Leonard - Restoration geek who works as a picker. He's always searching for some hidden gem or treasure.

=== Season 7 ===
- Bodie Stroud – owner of Bodie Stroud Industries, a custom auto and hot rod shop in Sun Valley, California
- Dale Walksler – owner of Wheels Through Time, located in Maggie Valley, North Carolina
- Andy Bowman Jr. – owner of Monkey Business, a custom fabrication shop just outside of Detroit, Michigan
- Steve Hale – owner of Steve's Restorations and Hot Rods, in Frankfort, New York
- Bob Halliday – owner of Bob's Garage, based in Marietta, Georgia

== Episodes ==
Season	Episodes	Originally released	
Season	Episodes	First released	Last released
1	4	October 25, 2010	November 1, 2010
2	30	April 15, 2011	November 18, 2011
3	47	January 11, 2012	January 9, 2013
4	17	April 9, 2013	June 18, 2013
Special	1	December 19, 2013	
5	13	January 7, 2014	March 4, 2014
6	13	June 5, 2014	September 3, 2014
7	13	January 1, 2016	April 1, 2016

== International broadcast ==
This series is seen outside the U.S. on most local versions of the History channel, usually under its international title, Kings of Restoration. In some countries such as India and Sri Lanka (History TV 18), the United Kingdom (History UK), New Zealand (Choice TV), Mexico (Proyecto 40), Australia (7mate), Asia (History Asia) and the Philippines (GMA News TV (dubbed), the series is broadcast using the same American Restoration title as the History channel in the U.S.

In Poland, Fokus TV, channel of Telewizja Polsat broadcast these series under the title "Akcja Renowacja USA"

== See also ==
- List of television shows set in Las Vegas
- Oddities, featuring a New York antiques and oddities store
