= Vendo =

Manufacturer of cold beverage vending machines

Sanden Vendo America
- Industry: Vending Machine Manufacturing and Distribution; Commercial Refrigeration
- Founded: 1937
- Headquarters: Dallas, Texas, United States,
- Area served: Worldwide
- Products: Vending Machines; Vending Machine Parts
- Number of employees: 400
- Website: Official website

The Vendo Company is a large manufacturer of cold beverage vending machines. Since its founding in 1937, Vendo has come out with many innovations that now exist in nearly every beverage and snack vending machine in use today. In 2005, Vendo moved its headquarters to Dallas, Texas, and was renamed SandenVendo America, Inc.

== History ==
Vendo was founded in 1937 in Kansas City, Missouri, by brothers Elmer F. and John T Pierson. With help from J.E. Hagstrom and purchased patent for a lid that could be attached to coolers, the brothers developed an innovative vending lid that was much more practical than any other one available at the time. Nicknamed "Red Top", this vending lid moved the opening to the bottle rather than the bottle to the opening and was the first of many innovations introduced by the Vendo company.

After the outbreak of World War II, some of the company's work force was dedicated to producing radar detection systems as well as various other electronic equipment for the military. As well as manufacturing military equipment, Vendo was authorized to produce and send 5,000 beverage vending units for military training camps and war plants to help raise morale. For its efforts, company earned seven Army-Navy ‘E’ Awards awards for "excellence in fulfilling government military contracts".

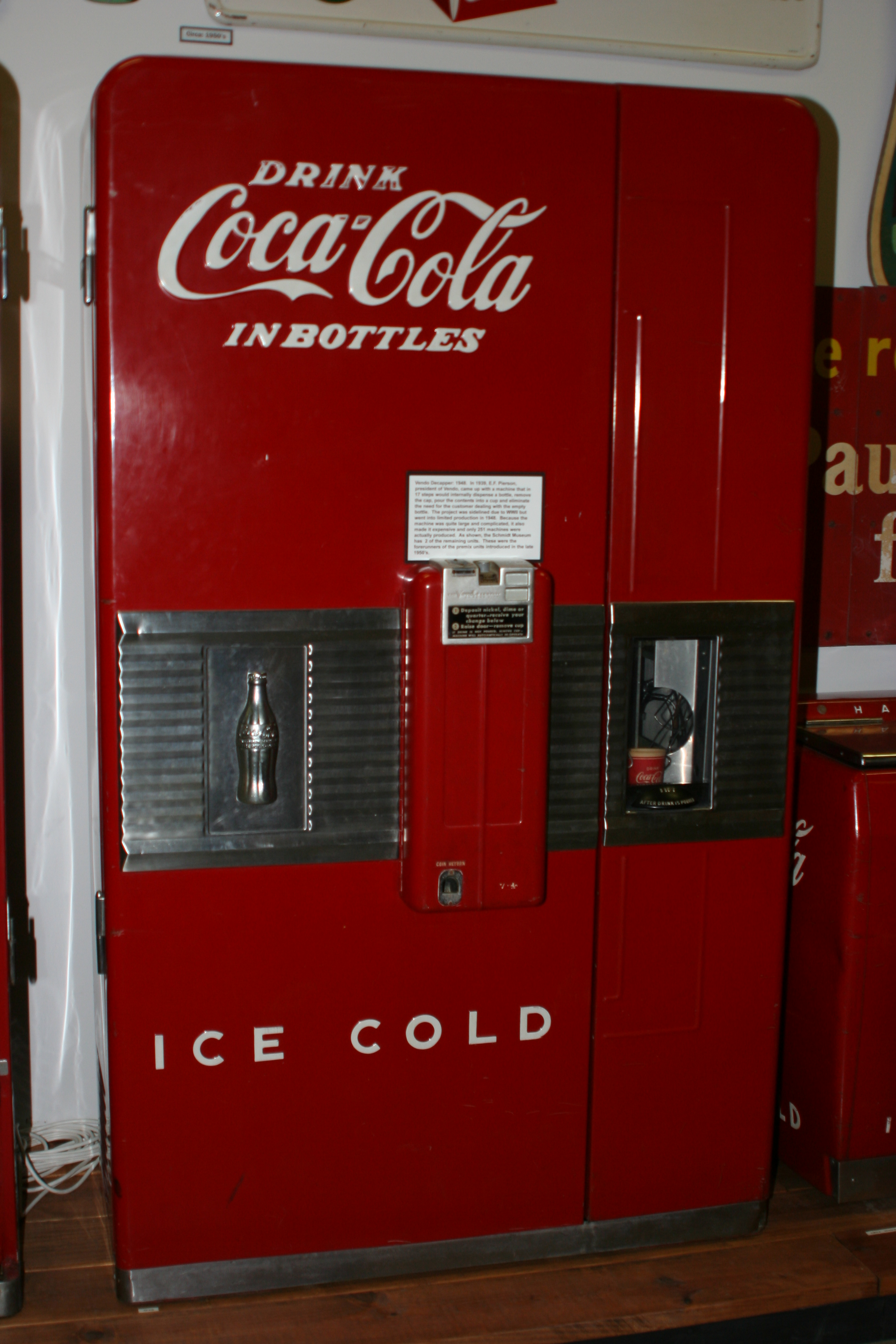
The 1948 Coca-Cola "Vendo Decapper" used 17 steps to dispense bottle, remove cap and pour into cup, eliminating the need for customers to dispose of bottles.

After the war, the Vendo company began expanding globally. By 1956, vending machines were being shipped internationally to 20 different countries. At the same time, Vendo began experimenting with new ideas. Vending machines that dispensed varieties of goods were manufactured and distributed and existing beverage vending machines were given a new, sleeker look. It was this time that the company began creating completely automated convenience stores and restaurants as well as drive-in refreshment stations. In 1956, Vendo merged with its primary rival, Vendorlator. It became a major supplier for the entire soft-drink industry and, for a brief period, the company went public. The company's expansion continued into the 1970s as the company expanded its international market and began manufacturing the world's first canned beverage dispensing machine.

The oil crisis of the 1970s struck a major blow to Vendo Co. Facing major financial losses, the company sold off all of its assets, keeping only its beverage machine distribution division. The site in Kansas City was abandoned and the company kept only the plants in Fresno, California and Corinth, Mississippi.

The company was revitalized in the 1980s when it was acquired by Sanden Corporation, a manufacturer of high-tech electronics. The company received both technological and financial support from its new parent company and once again began introducing innovations to the automated goods distribution market. By the end of the 1990s, Vendo had received patents on many new features for vending machines, such as increased capacity, accommodation for goods of many different shapes and sizes, and the ability to accept debit cards as a form of payment. The company began to expand again into the 2000s, moving its headquarters to Dallas, Texas and taking on the name "Sanden Vendo" to show its thanks and loyalty to the Sanden Corporation.

Along with Dixie-Narco, a rival company, Vendo is one of the main providers of vending machines for PepsiCo, particularly in the western United States. Vendo is also a major provider of vending machines for the Dr. Pepper Snapple Group and a secondary provider for The Coca-Cola Company.

== Products ==
Although Vendo makes most of its profit from selling vending machines and vending machine parts, the company also sells display stands for both refrigerated and hot food as well as vending machine parts, versatile delivery systems and payment systems that will accept credit cards or dispense bills.

=== Vending Machines ===
- Snack Vendors
- Beverage Vendors

=== Food Displays ===
- Hot food display stands
- Refrigerated display stands

=== Vending Machine Parts ===
- Refrigeration systems
- Coin mechanisms
- Cash-handling systems
- Parts for any vending machine made in the last ten years
