= Sanden Corporation =

Japanese automotive and electrical equipment manufacturer

- Type: Public KK
- Traded as: TYO: 6444; FWB: SOE1
- Industry: Automotive; Electrical equipment
- Founded: July 30, 1943
- Headquarters: 20 Kotobuki-cho, Isesaki-shi, Gunma, Japan 372-8502
- Area served: Worldwide
- Key people: Masayoshi Ushikubo, (CEO and Chairman)
- Products: Air conditioning systems; Central heating systems; Compressors; Heat exchangers; Infrared radiant heating units; Refrigerated display cabinets; Retail refrigerators and freezers; Vending machines
- Revenue: ▲$ 2.570 billion USD (FY 2012) (¥ 241.78 billion JPY) (FY 2013)
- Net income: ▼$ 11.52 million USD (FY 2013) (¥ 1.08 billion JPY) (FY 2013)
- Number of employees: ▲10,194 (consolidated) (as of March 31, 2013)
- Subsidiaries: 53 (in Japan and 21 overseas countries)
- Website: Official website

Sanden Corporation (サンデン株式会社, Sanden Kabushiki Kaisha) is a Japanese, Isesaki, Gunma-based automotive equipment and electrical equipment manufacturing company and is listed on the Tokyo Stock Exchange.

== History ==
Kaihei Ushikubo founded the company, Sankyo Electric Company (Sankyo Denki Co), in July 1943. The company's first products were wireless communication devices, mica-condensers, and paper-condensers. Five years later the company expanded their product line by adding dynamo bicycle lamps to their products.

In the 1950s the company started producing home electric appliances, refrigerated showcases and mini-motors. In 1961 production of juice vending machines is established and one year later, in August 1962, the company is listed on the second section of the Tokyo Stock Exchange.

The 1970s brought the introduction of automotive products to the product line, namely automotive air-conditioners and SD compressors for automotive air-conditioners. In August 1973 the "Sanden" trade name is established and the company's stocks are listed on the first section of the aforementioned stock exchange. Also in this decade the company established several subsidiaries, namely in the United States, Singapore and Australia and a branch in Great Britain.

In October 1982 the company's name is changed; Sankyo Electric Co., Ltd. becoming Sanden Corporation. In 1984 the company expanded their global presence by establishing joint ventures in India, Malaysia, and Mexico (Sanden Mexicana). Four years later Sanden acquired Vendo Company, a US-based vending machine manufacturer.

In the 1990s the company started to develop energy-saving, ozone layer friendly products. Also it developed Technical Assistance Agreement with major automakers like Ford Motor Company and General Motors Company and expanded its manufacturing capabilities by opening manufacturing plants in France and Thailand. In 2012 also Sanden Manufacturing Mexico was founded.

In November 1999 the founder of the company, Kaihei Ushikubo, died.

Focusing on environmentally friendly manufacturing, the company achieved zero-emission at three domestic plants (Kotobuki, Yattajima, and Sakai plants). In 2001 Sanden achieved the production of the accumulated number of 100 million compressor units and in May 2006 received the "2005 Supplier of the year" from General Motors and the "Global Excellence Award" from Ford Motors.

Also in 2005 Sanden signed a comprehensive agreement with Waseda University's Environmental Research Institute, to promote environmental technology development in business-academia collaboration. In the following years the company opened manufacturing plants in India, China, Poland and Thailand and signed partnerships with other automakers.

== Business segments and products ==
- Automotive Systems
  - Air conditioning systems
  - HVAC units
  - Compressors
  - Heat exchangers for air conditioners
- Vending Systems
  - Vending machines for various merchandise (including cold beverages, milk beverages, coffee, tea, flex venders, ice-cream, cup-noodles)
- Retail Store Systems
  - Refrigerators
  - Freezers
  - Multi temperature horizontal refrigerated display cabinets
- Living & Environment Systems
  - Heat pump hot water floor heating systems
  - Far infrared radiant heating units
  - IH cooking heaters
  - Hot water supply systems
