= Facing (retail) =

Practice of pulling products forward on a shelf

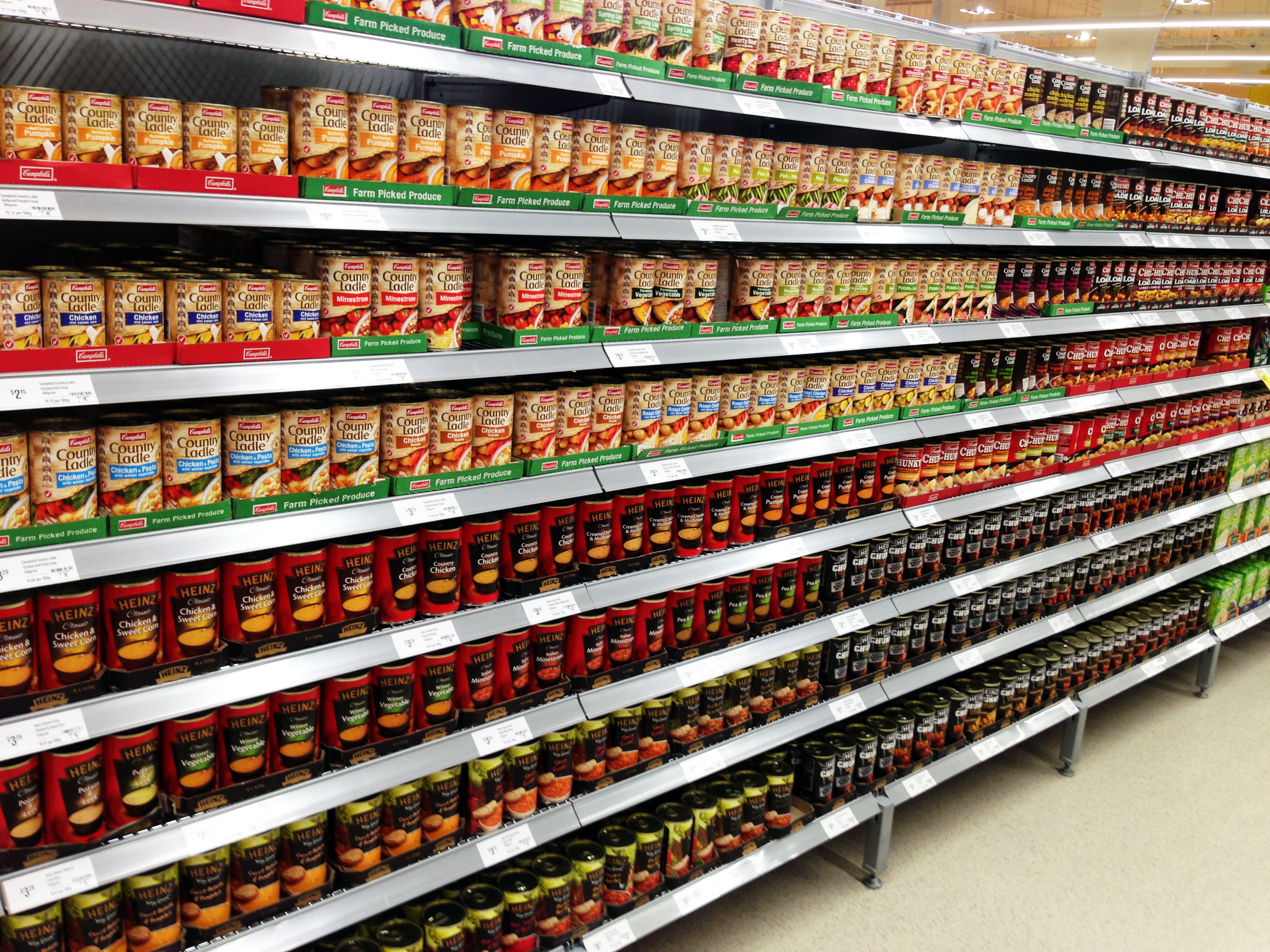
Faced products on a shelf at a Coles supermarket

In the retail industry, facing (also known as blocking, zoning, levelling or dressing) is the practice of pulling products forward to the front of the display or shelf on which they are placed, typically with the items' labels facing forward. This is done to keep a store appearing neat and organized, and can help create the illusion of a perfectly stocked store.

Facings also refer to the amount of shelf space a particular product is given. A lot of facing generally increases sales of a particular product, therefore manufacturers often pay more money to get more facings for their products. This can lead to situations in which the largest manufacturers end up with the most shelf space because they have the greatest ability to pay.

An extreme version of the tactic is front-filling, where items are moved to the front of the shelves to address supply chain shortages. In some cases, products may be spread across empty spaces to conceal gaps and maintain the appearance of a fully stocked shelf.

In department stores it may be referred to as recovery, as in the store is recovering from the rush of customers that affect the model appearance the store wants to portray. Merchandise may be put in the wrong area, or customers may leave debris on the floor. Correcting these issues is a part of the recovery process.

== See also ==
- Visual merchandising
