= Slatwall =

Building material

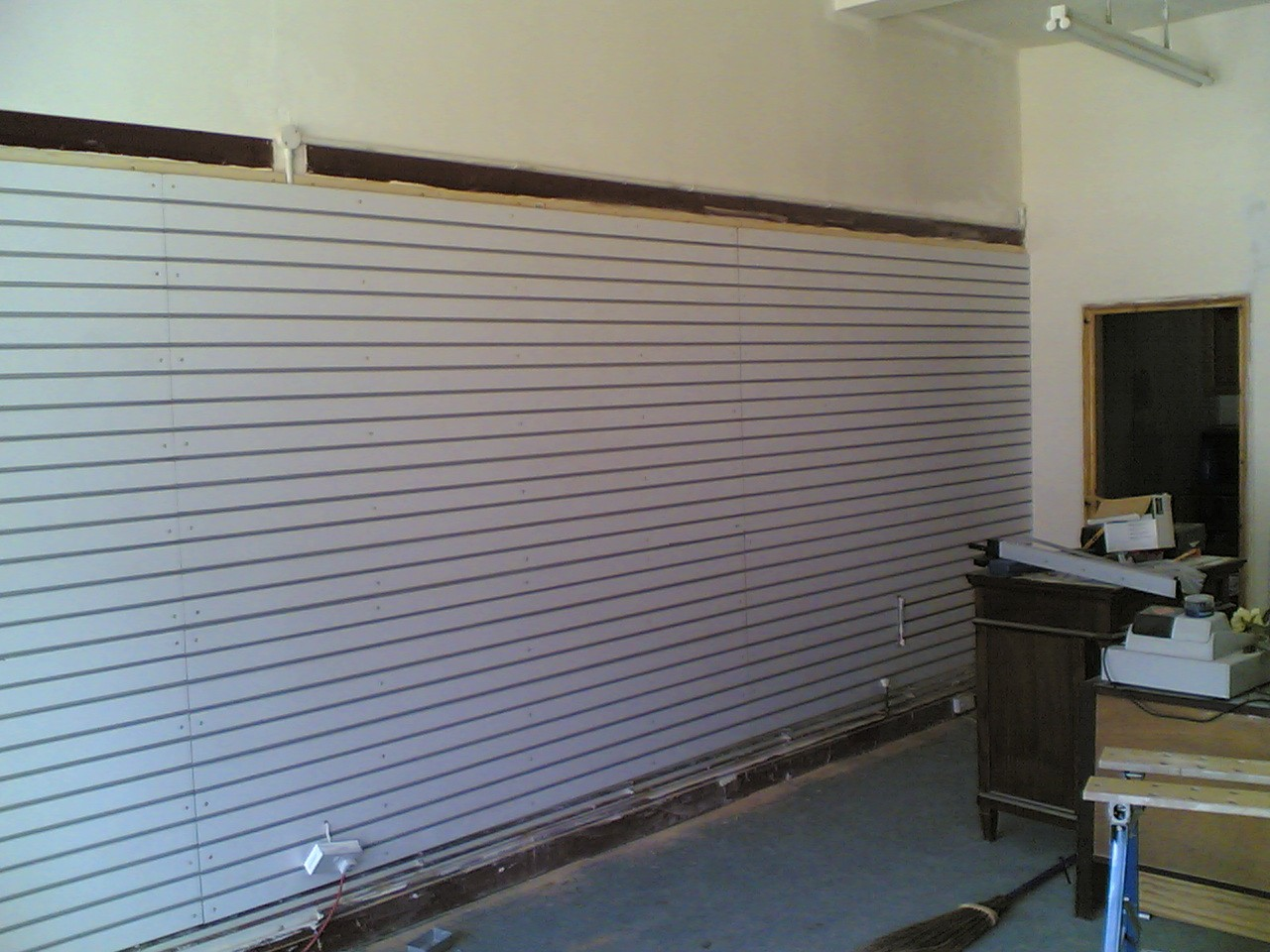
Slatwall

Slatwall (also known as Slat Wall and slotwall) is a building material used in shopfitting and interior design for wall coverings or display fixtures. It is made using a wide range of different materials depending on the usage and cost. In the past Slatwall was only known as a shop fitting product, usually 4 by 8 feet (1.2 m × 2.4 m). The shopfitting products are made with horizontal grooves that are configured to accept a variety of merchandising accessories with ease.
