= Counter display unit =

A counter display unit (CDU) is a retail display unit normally placed on a shop counter to encourage consumer impulse purchases.

== Description ==
These types of display stands are principally fabricated from printed corrugated board, acrylic, sheet metal, steel wire, vacuum formed plastic and wood or indeed a combination of more than one of these materials. Choice of material is often dictated by the length of time the display unit will be in store. Printed corrugated board is more suited to short-term promotional CDUs due to its relatively low cost and durability of the material, whereas acrylic, metal, wood, etc. are more suitable for longer-term CDU's due to greater durability of those materials.

== History ==
CDUs have been used in one form or another since at least the 18th century. Over the years, a variety of patents being granted for different designs.

== See also ==
- Display case
- Display stand
