= Gondolier (disambiguation) =

A gondolier is a Venetian boatman who propels a gondola.

Gondolier may also refer to:

- "Gondolier" (song), a popular 1957 song by Dalida
- Gondolier (album), a 1958 album by Dalida
- PS Gondolier, a paddle steamer

== See also ==
- The Gondoliers, an 1891 opera by Gilbert and Sullivan
- The Silent Gondoliers, a 1983 novel by William Goldman, written under the pseudonym of "S. Morgenstern".
- Broadway Gondolier, a musical film directed by Lloyd Bacon released 1935.
