= Country Development Unit =

Aid organization in Afghanistan

The Country Development Unit is a non-political and non-governmental organization in Afghanistan, established in early 1992 to participate in the rehabilitation and development of the war-torn country. It has registered with the MoP and is a member of the Afghan NGOs' Coordination Bureau .

Projects have been implemented with the collaboration of donors such as UNHCR, UNICEF, UNOPS, ADB, CIDA, CARE, Hummer Forum, IRC, JEN LBG/USAID and ICR.

The projects implemented comprised road rehabilitation, irrigation net works, clinic construction, return and IDP rapid assessment surveys, shelter, shallow well development, IGP (quilt making, stove production, carpentry training and production), school construction, and distribution of food and non-food items. Badakhshan, Logar, Kabul, Kapisa and Khost were covered by the projects.

CDU is involved with the Construction Vocational Training Projects such as Wooden Productive. Carpentry Training in Jabal Saraj, Parwan where 240 carpenters were trained in 2002 and now it is one of the CDU's ongoing projects on IG bases. CDU want to expand these kinds of training in Kabul as well as other provinces.

== Mission ==
CDU is an Afghan non-governmental, humanitarian organization that supports sustainable development in Afghanistan through promoting the ability of local communities to decide upon and manage their own development process.

The aim is cooperation with civil society organizations, the private sector and governmental institutions, with an emphasis on poverty eradication, and assistance towards the return and re-integration of refugees and internally displaced people.

List of projects implemented:

- Domanda-Khost Feeder Road
- Arram Kot Road
- Rehabilitation of Shindand-Hirat Highway
- Construction of Asmar-Kunar Road structures
- Construction of Helipad
- Earth works of Taluqan-Kishm Road

Building construction/renovation

- 52 Shelter in Lugar
- Construction of 5 Community Center (schools)
- Construction of Guard Rm for IRC in Shashdarak
- Construction of auto workshop for IRC
- 300 shelter for returnees and IDPs
- Refurbishment of Nomad School
- Rehabilitation of Construction Dep (MoEd)
- Floor Marbling of Construction Dep (MoEd)
- 1000 shelter for returnees and IDPs
- Ebrahim Khil Clinic (BHC)
- Melan Clinic (BHC)
- Mamuzai Jani Khil Clinic (BHC)
- Arma Clinic (BHC)
- Surkai Clinic (BHC)
- Kolalgu Clinic (CHC)
- Shwak Clinic (BHC)
- Kohseen Clinic (BHC)
- Dem Ghundi Mangal Clinic (BHC)
- Mirzaka Mangal Clinic (BHC)
- Tashnak Clinic (BHC)
- Jani Khil Clinic (CHC)
- Dre Khuleh Clinic (BHC)
- Ebrahim Khil Clinic (BHC)
- Sajawand Clinic (BHC)
- Shah Mazar Clinic (BHC)
- Deh Dushanbe Clinics (BHC)
- Mir Barakat Clinic (BHC)
- Garmaba Clinic (CHC)
- Burg Clinic (BHC)
- Kharuti Clinic (BHC)
- Khuja Angur Clinic (BHC)
- Shikhan Clinic (BHC)
- Roof Retrofit of 13 clinics in Paktya Province
- Roof Retrofit of 8 clinics in Badakhshan Province
- Roof Retrofit of 5 clinics in Ghazni (5 CHC)
- Comp of remaining works of Khwar Qul (CHC)
- Comp of remaining works of Jaka Pashi (CHC)
- Comp of remaining works of Sangar (CHC)
- Comp of remaining works of Turmai (CHC)
- Comp of remaining works of Askar Kot (CHC)
- Comp of remaining works of Bagh Sarkari (CHC)
- Comp of remaining works of Babur (BHC)
- Comp of remaining works of Meshan (CHC)
- Comp of remaining works of Tulakan (BHC)
- Comp of remaining works of Nahr Rubat (BHC)
- Renovation of Baraki Hospital
- Modification of Jaji Custom House
- Construction of Black Horse project
- Renovation of bathroom and shower facilities
- Water Pump House in Ghazni and Gardiz
- Refurbishment of 23 school and clinics
- Renovation of KIMS Wardak (MRI Clinic)
- Construction of Latrine and Bio Gas Digester
- Construction of Yawan CHC
- Construction of annexes to Yawan CHC

Irrigation network

- Construction of Khairabad intake
- Rehabilitation of Karizes

Water supply and sanitation

- Shallow well construction
- Rural water sanitation and hygiene education
- Water Supply
- Water Supply and Sanitation for Schools

Vocational training

- Carpentry Training Center
- Production of 4500 quilts by women
- Production of 4000 coal stoves (apprenticeship Prog)
- Productive wood Work Training Center (IGP)
- Gilim weaving training and health education (female)
- Quilt Making Project for women

Distribution of relief goods

- Distribution of relief goods for returnees
- Distribution of school bags for students
- IDPs Rapid Assessment Survey
- Supply of school furniture (Durkhani GHS)
- Distribution of food and non-food items
- Distribution of food and non-food items
- Supply of door/window

== Address ==
- House # 88, Charrahi Haji Mohammad Dad, Taimani Road, Kabul-City, Afghanistan
