= Control display unit =

A control display unit (CDU) is used in remotely operated gasfields placed on the seabed. It distributes power, control signals and chemicals arriving through the umbilical and pipelines from land to the other sub-sea structures. The connection point – manifold – in the control distribution unit can be retrieved to the surface for maintenance and modifications.
