= Display stand =

Shop fitting

A display stand is a free-standing physical fitting/fixture in a shop on which products are arranged. It is an advertising and merchandising tool that has a direct impact on product sales.

Artwork or statuary may also have a display stand to hold items securely for viewing.

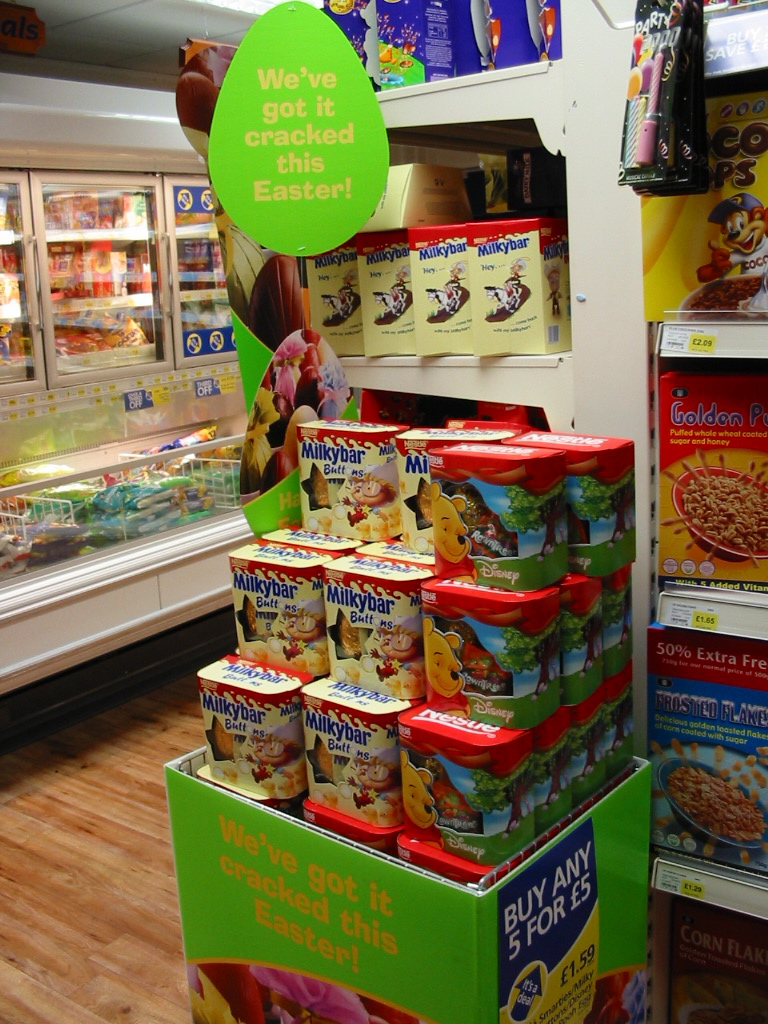
A point-of-sale display assembled by a contract packager

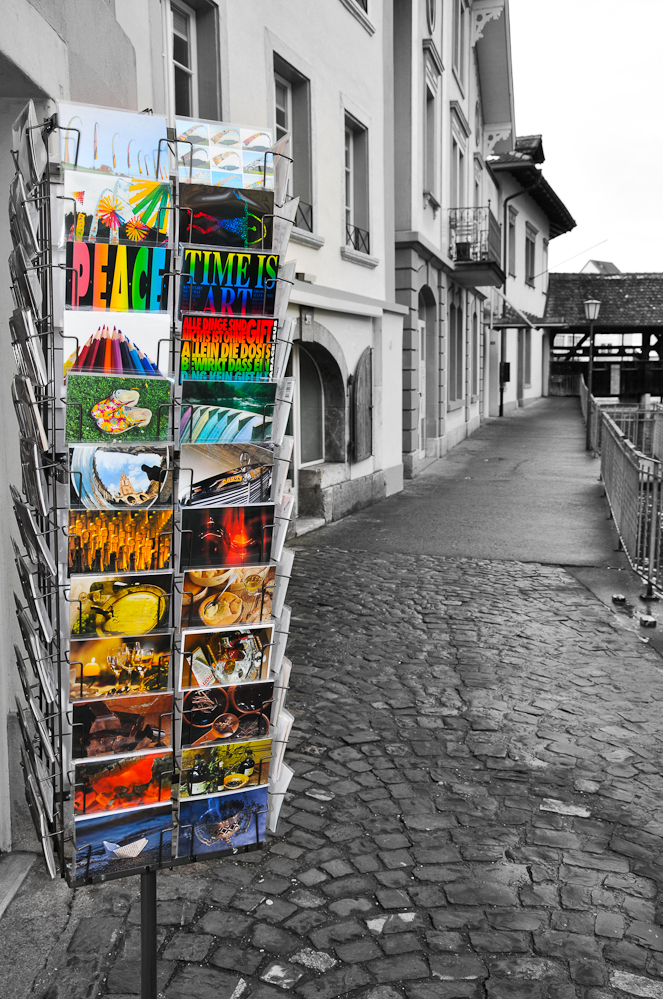
Display stand for postcards

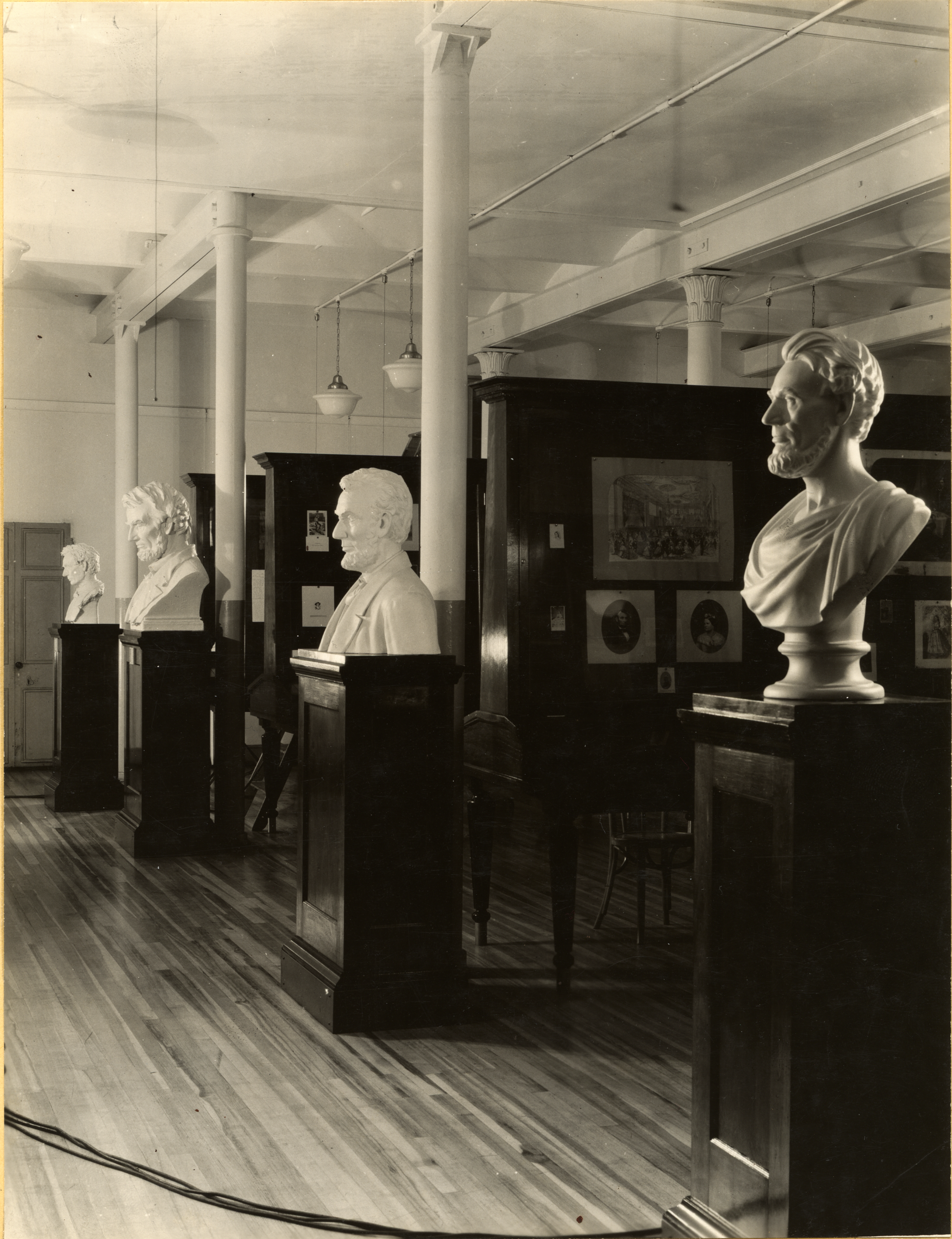
Display stands for statues in museum

== Features ==
From a functional perspective, a display should focus on the consumer's wish to purchase goods and should grab the attention, interest, desire, memory, and a series of mental activities. In addition to color, text, graphics, and other elements of interior design, the display stand embodies the use of POP advertising functions. A display of goods must be met to convey information and the sales functions of goods and should have a personal style and structure design. Important characteristics of a display stand are: appearance, solid structure, easy assembly, fast disassembly and convenient transportation. Display stands are commonly manufactured from corrugated fiberboard, fluted polypropylene (aka corrugated plastic or correx) and acrylic. Corrugated and fluted polypropylene stands can be full colour printed and supplied as flat-packs, ready for quick assembly.

== See also ==
- Display case
- Endcap
- Shelf-ready packaging
- Counter display unit
- Exhibit design
