= Chevrolet Chevy II / Nova =

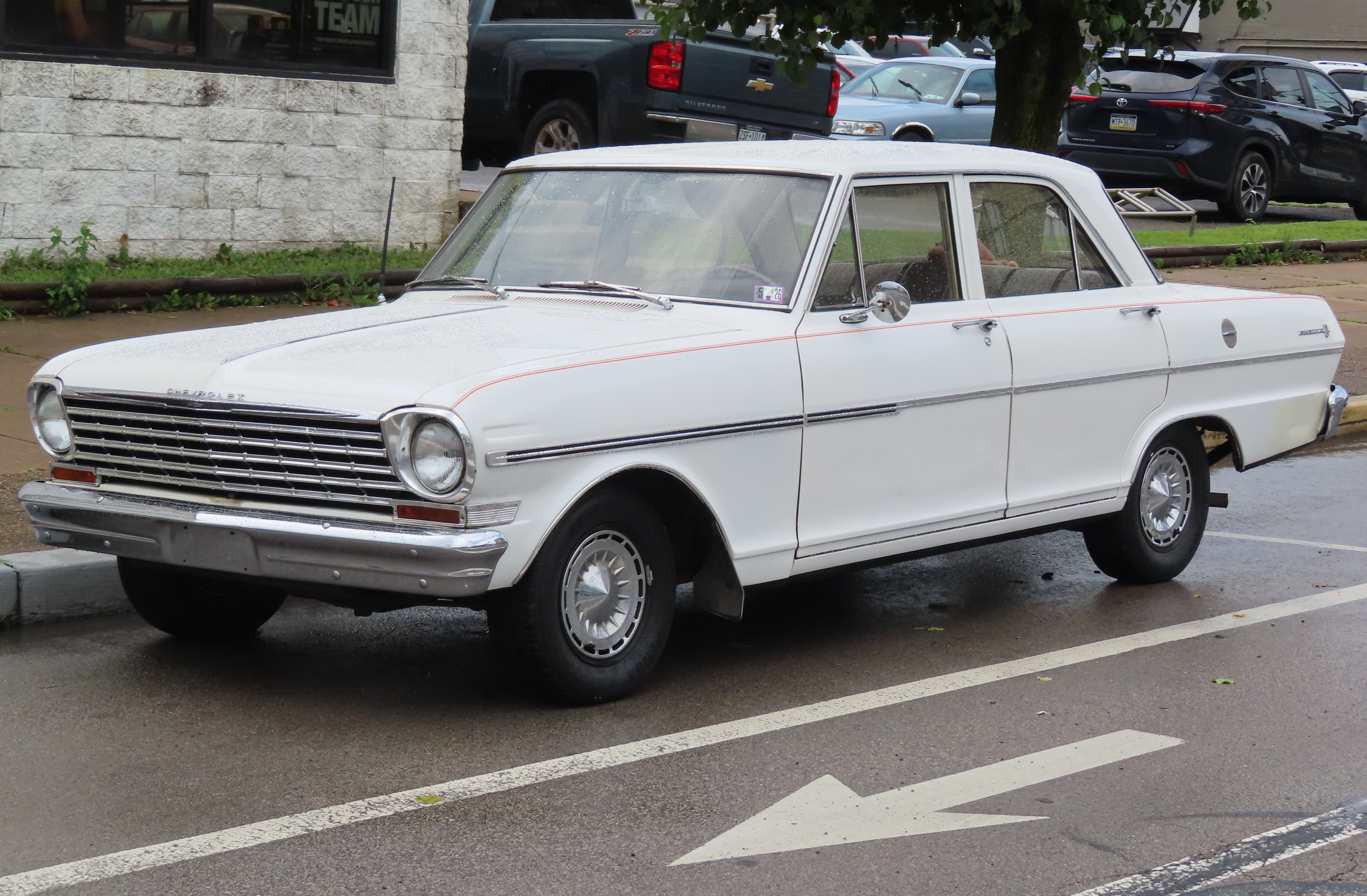
- 1963 Chevrolet Chevy II 300 4-door sedan

Overview
- Manufacturer: Chevrolet (General Motors); NUMMI (1985–1988)
- Production: 1961–1979; 1985–1988
- Model years: 1962–1979; 1985–1988

Body and chassis
- Class: Compact (1962–1979); Subcompact (1985–1988)

Chronology
- Successor: Chevrolet Citation (compact model); Geo Prizm; (subcompact model)

The Chevrolet Chevy II (also known as the Chevrolet Nova) is a compact car that was sold by Chevrolet between the 1962 and 1979 model years. The inaugural model of the GM X platform, the Chevy II was slotted between the Chevrolet Corvair (later the Chevrolet Vega) and the Chevrolet Chevelle within the Chevrolet model line. For 1969, the Chevy II nameplate was dropped, with all versions of the model line sold as the Nova.

The first two generations of the model line were sold only by Chevrolet, but the third-generation Nova was also rebranded as the Buick Apollo, Pontiac Ventura, and Oldsmobile Omega - with the initials of the four variants spelling out "Nova". In 1975, the fourth-generation Nova shared its chassis (but no bodywork) with the Cadillac Seville; Buick renamed the Apollo as the Skylark, with Pontiac renaming the Ventura as the Phoenix. For 1980, GM downsized and redesigned the X platform (changing to front-wheel drive); Chevrolet dropped the Nova nameplate in favor of Chevrolet Citation.

For 1985, Chevrolet revived the Nova nameplate for its NUMMI joint venture with Toyota, used for a subcompact using the body of the E80 Toyota Sprinter. Designated as the S platform, the fifth-generation Nova was slotted between the Chevrolet Chevette and the Chevrolet Cavalier in size; for 1989, the Chevrolet Nova was replaced by the Geo Prizm as Chevrolet moved its Japanese-developed cars into its Geo subbrand.

== History ==
=== Origin ===
Chevrolet designer Clare MacKichan recalled about creating the Chevy II: "There was no time for experimentation or doodling around with new ideas from either the engineers or from us in design; And it had to be a basic-type car." The 1962 Chevy II rode a 110 in (2,794 mm) wheelbase, compared to 109.5 in (2,781 mm) for the Ford Falcon, at which Chevy's new compact was aimed. "I think that was the quickest program we ever did at any time," he continued. "We worked night and day on that car, and it didn't take very long to run it through our shop because we had a deadline." And that is what made the Chevy II one of the fastest new-car development programs in GM history – just 18 months after the designers got the green light, the first production Chevy II rolled off the Willow Run, Michigan, assembly line in August 1961, in time for its September 29 introduction. (Popular Mechanics magazine reported in November 1961 that "It is obvious...that Chevy II was waiting in the wings--well into prototype development stages--in the winter of 1960, as management waited to see which way the winds of public preference would blow.") Unlike the Corvair, the 1962 Chevy II design team deliberately avoided any revolutionary features in concept or execution; their mission was to give Chevrolet buyers a simple, back-to-the-basics compact car. When he announced the Chevy II to the press, Chevrolet General Manager Ed Cole described the car as offering "maximum functionalism with thrift." When the Chevy II was introduced, it was the second post-WWII American made car from the "Big 3", after the Pontiac Tempest (and the first Chevrolet since the 1928 Chevrolet National), to use a four-cylinder engine.

There was a lot of discussion and controversy within the Chevrolet organization regarding the name of the car, and the decision to go with "Chevy II" was a very late one. Among the finalists was Nova. It lost out because it didn't start with a "C," but was selected as the name for the top-of-the-line series. Ultimately the Nova badge would replace Chevy II, but that wouldn't happen until 1969. In almost every way, the creators of the Chevy II used Falcon as a benchmark. The 1962 model range included sedans and wagons, as well as a two-door hardtop and a convertible. The only body styles it didn't offer which the Falcon did were a 2-door wagon/sedan delivery and coupe utility (the Ford Falcon Ranchero).

== First generation (1962–1965) ==
Chevrolet Chevy II; First generation
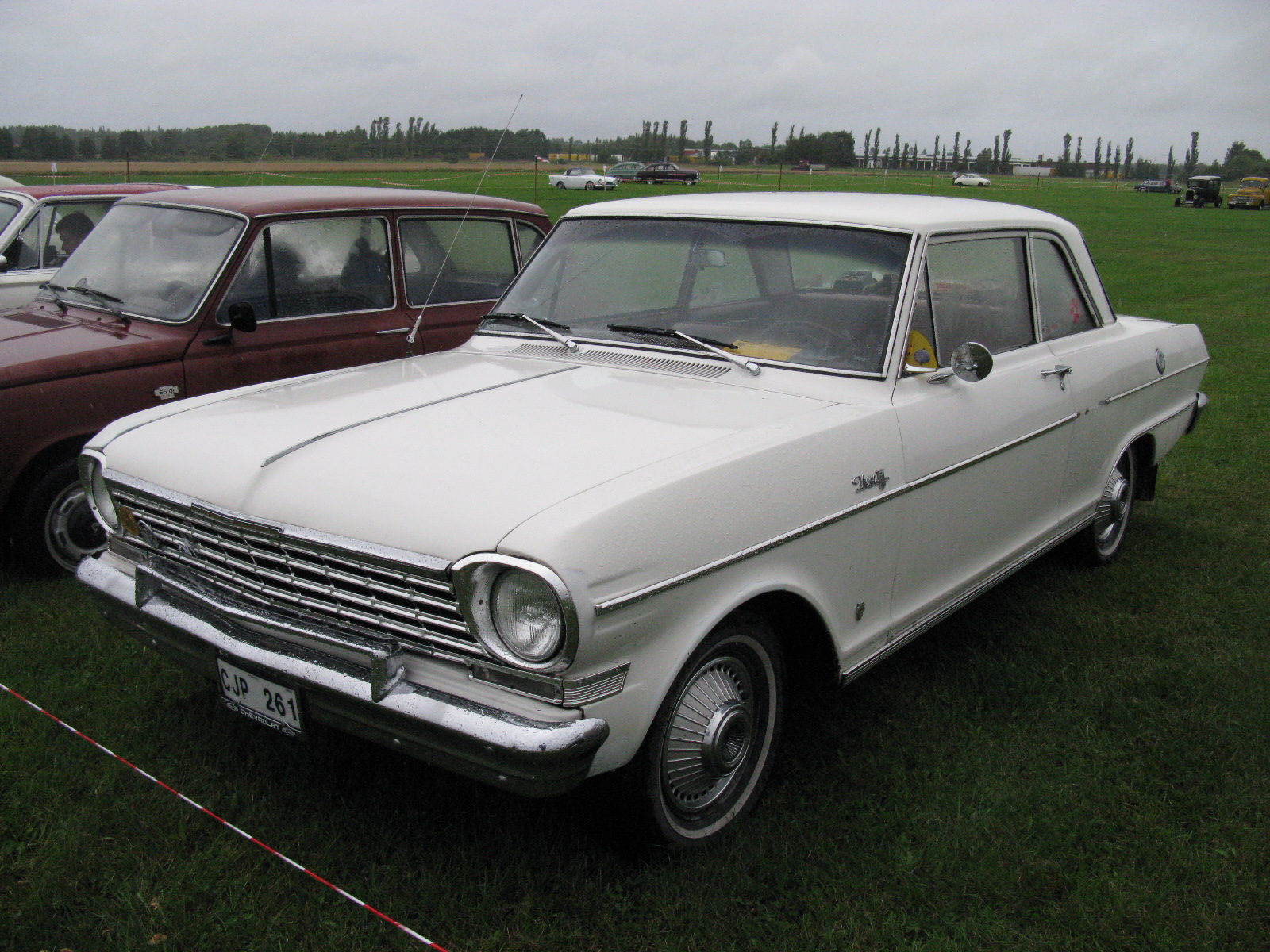
- 1964 Chevrolet Chevy II two door sedan

Overview
- Production: 1961–1965
- Model years: 1962–1965
- Assembly: United States: Framingham, Massachusetts (Framingham Assembly, 1962–1963); Kansas City, Missouri (Leeds Assembly, 1962–1963); Norwood, Ohio (Norwood Assembly); Oakland, California (Oakland Assembly, 1962–1963); Ypsilanti, Michigan (Willow Run Assembly); Argentina: Buenos Aires; Belgium: Antwerp; Canada: Oshawa, Ontario (Oshawa Assembly); Switzerland: Bienne
- Designer: Clare MacKichan

Body and chassis
- Class: Compact
- Body style: 2-door sedan; 2-door hardtop; 2-door convertible (1962–63); 4-door sedan; 4-door station wagon
- Layout: FR layout
- Platform: X-body
- Related: Acadian; Chevrolet 400 (Argentina)

Powertrain
- Engine: 153 cu in (2.5 L) Chevrolet 153 I4; 194 cu in (3.2 L) I6; 230 cu in (3.8 L) I6; 283 cu in (4.6 L) V8; 327 cu in (5.4 L) V8
- Transmission: 3/4-speed manual; 2-speed Powerglide automatic

Dimensions
- Wheelbase: 110 in (2,794 mm)
- Length: 183 in (4,648 mm) Sedan, Coupe; 187.4 in (4,760 mm) Station Wagon
- Width: 70.8 in (1,798 mm)
- Height: 54–55 in (1,372–1,397 mm) depending on body style

After the rear-engine Chevrolet Corvair was outsold by the conventional Ford Falcon in 1960, Chevrolet completed work on a more conventional compact car that would eventually become the Chevy II. The car was of semi-unibody construction having a bolt on front section joined to its unitized cabin and trunk rear section, available in two- and four-door sedan configurations as well as convertible and 4-door station wagon versions. The 1962 Chevy II came in three series and five body styles—the 100 Series, 300 Series and Nova 400 Series. A 200 series was also introduced, but was discontinued almost immediately. The sportiest-looking of the lot was the US$2,475 ($26,343 in 2025 dollars) Nova 400 convertible—23,741 were produced that year.

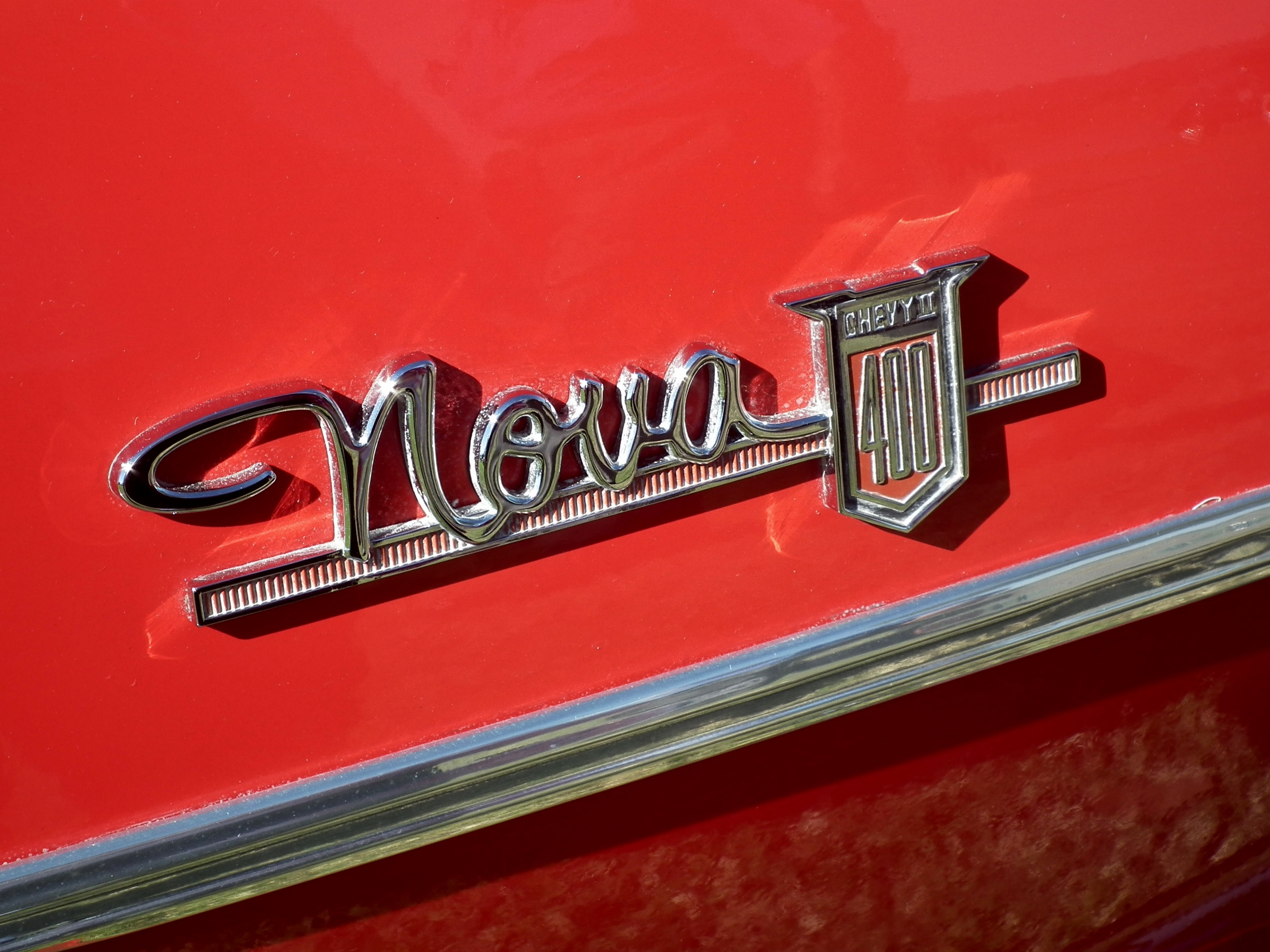
1960s Chevrolet Nova emblem

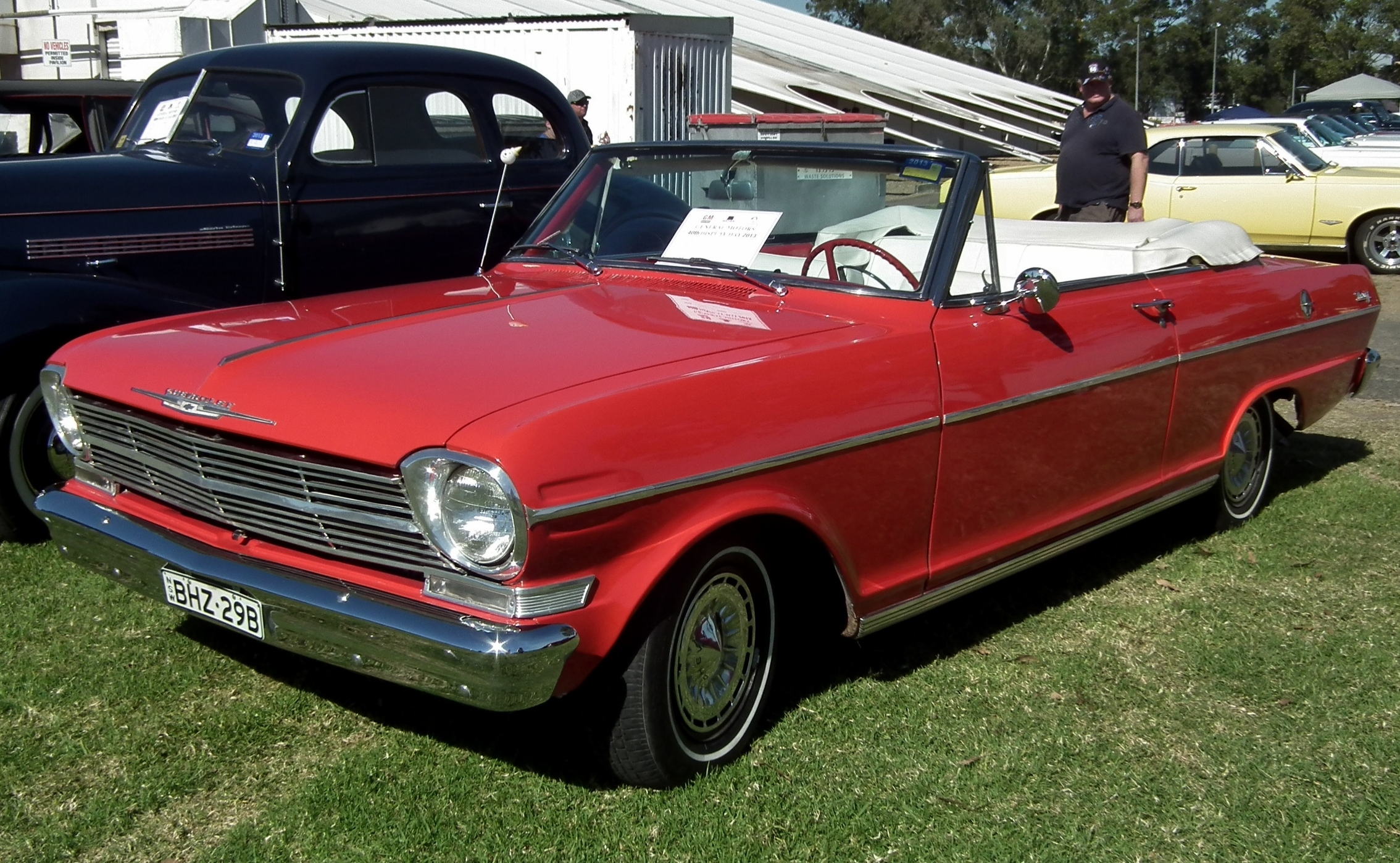
1962 Chevrolet Chevy II Nova 400 convertible

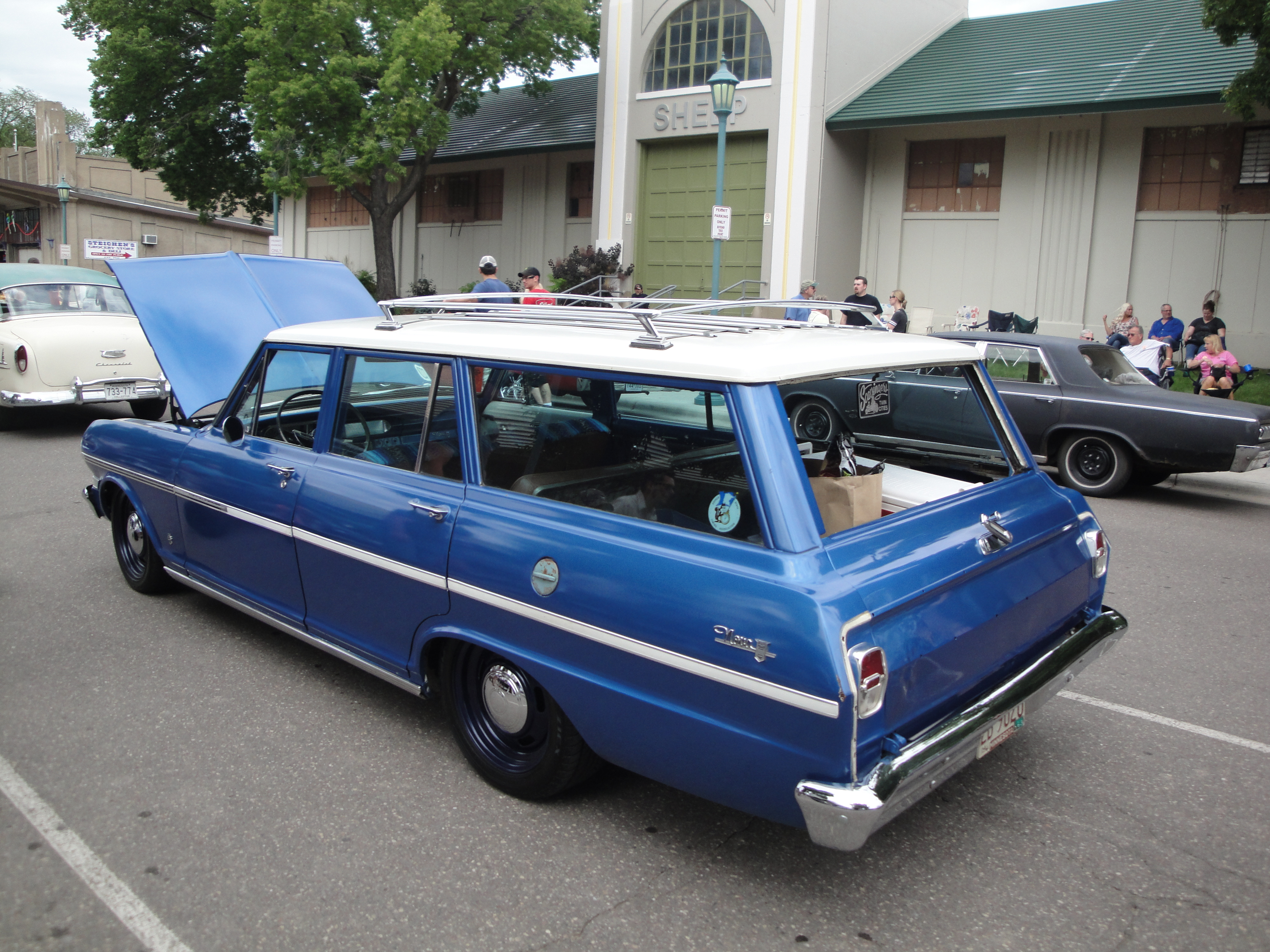
1963 Chevrolet Chevy II Nova 400 4-Door Station Wagon

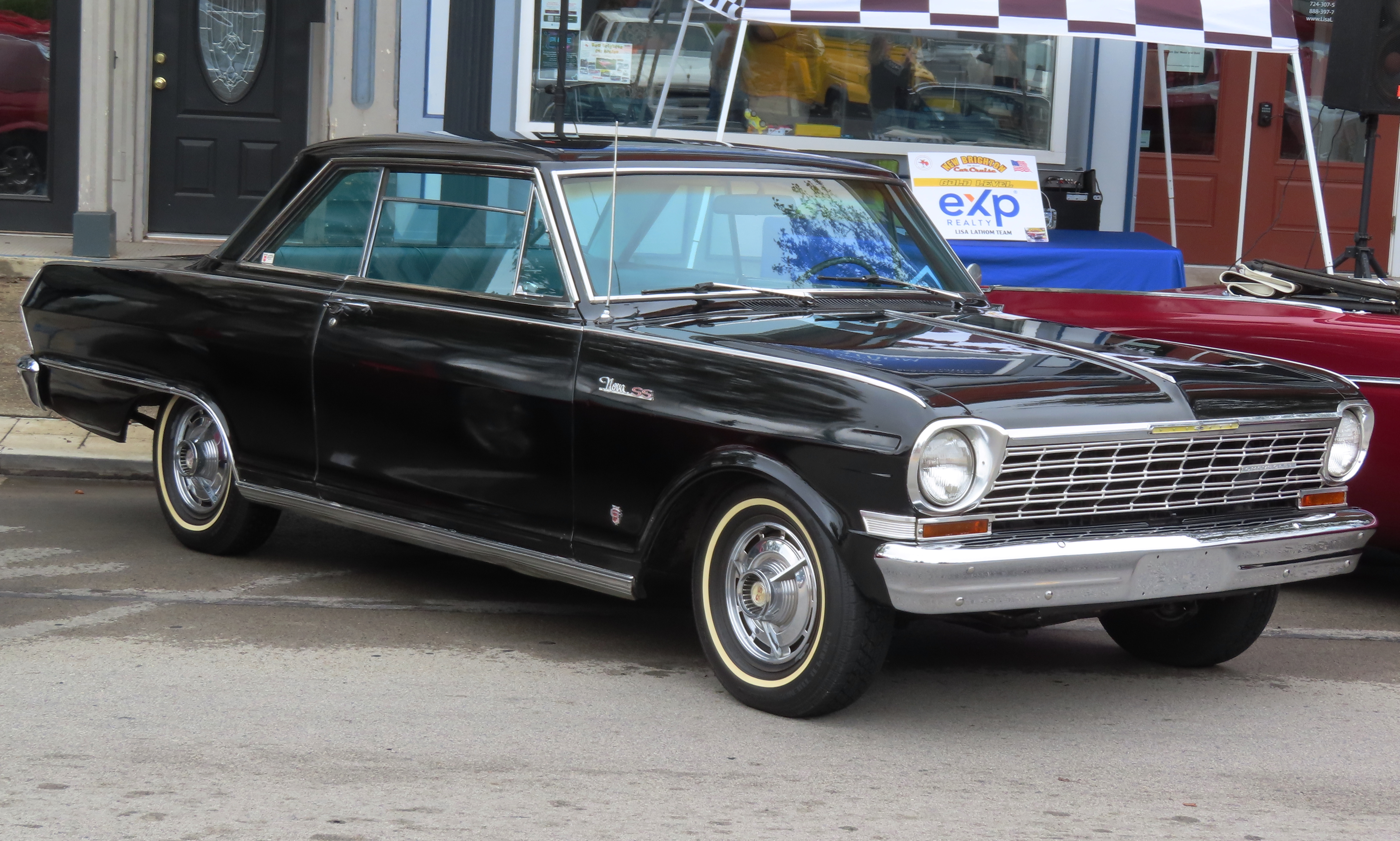
1964 Chevrolet Chevy II Nova Super Sport Coupe

Available engines for the Chevy II in 1962 and 1963 included Chevrolet's inline-four engine of 153 cu in (2.5 L) and a new 194 cu in (3.2 L) Hi-Thrift straight-six engine. All Chevy II engines featured overhead valves.

In 1962 and 1963 the Nova option for the Chevy II was available in a convertible body style, and a two-door hardtop was available from 1962 to 1965, although the hardtop was dropped when the 1964 models were first introduced, but subsequently brought back to the line later in the model year. Like all Chevy two-door hardtops, the body style was marketed as the Sport Coupe.

For 1963, the Chevy II Nova Super Sport was released, under RPO Z03. It featured special emblems, instrument package, wheel covers, side moldings, bucket seats, and floor shifter, and was available only on the 400 series sport coupe and convertible. Cost of the package was US$161.40 (equivalent to $1,718 in 2025). As mentioned above, the Nova option could not officially have V8 engines at this time—the standard SS engine was the six-cylinder (this was also applicable to the Impala (and later the early Chevelle c. 1964–65) when the SS was a sport and appearance package)—but small-block V8 engine swaps were commonplace among enthusiasts.

For 1964, sales were hit hard by the introduction of the new Chevelle, and the Chevy II received its first factory V8 option, a 195 hp (145 kW) 283 cu in (4.6 L), as well as a 230 cu in (3.8 L) straight six. The six-cylinder was all-new, replacing the older Stovebolt engine. Rival manufacturer Chrysler had earlier developed the Slant Six in their Plymouth Valiant, a Chevy II competitor, when the cars were introduced to the public in late 1959 as 1960 models. At introduction in the fall, the hardtop coupe was missing in the lineup, contributing to a loss of sales (as well as showroom appeal). Chevrolet subsequently reintroduced the Sport Coupe in the lineup later in the model year, and it remained available through 1967.

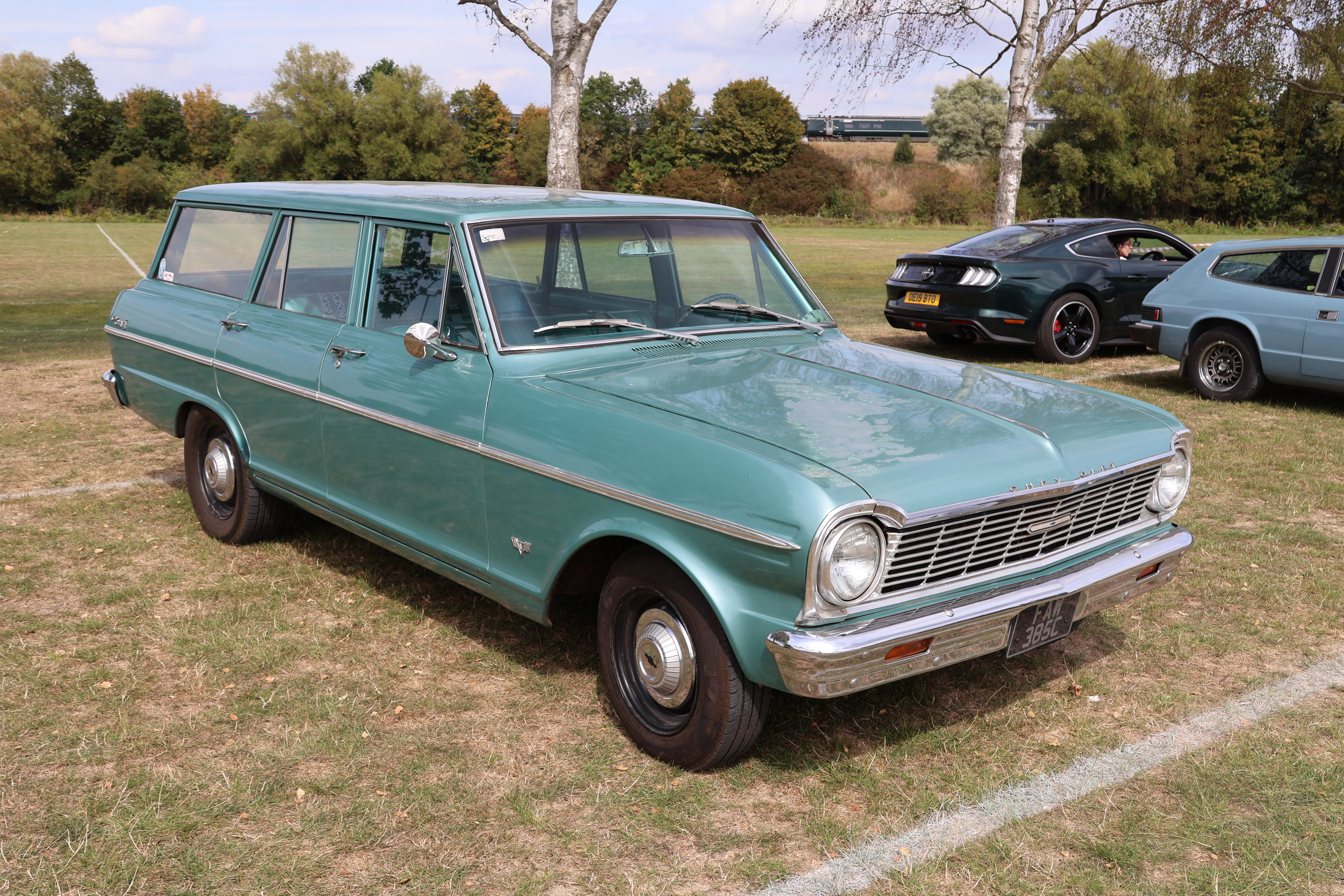
1965 Chevrolet Chevy II Nova 4-Door 6-Passenger Wagon

The 1965 Chevrolet Chevy II and Nova were updated with cleaner front-end styling courtesy of a fresh full-width grille with new integrated headlight bezels. Parking lights moved down to the deep-section bumper, and sedans gained a new roofline. Taillight and backup lights were restyled, as was the rear cove. The 1965 Chevy II came in entry-level 100 form or as the posher Nova 400, each in three body styles. The Nova Super Sport came as a Sport Coupe only, and its production dipped to just 9,100 cars. Super Sports had a new brushed-chrome console with floor-mounted four-speed manual transmission or Powerglide automatic, but a column-mounted three-speed manual remained standard. Bucket seats wore textured vinyl trim, and the dashboard held ammeter, oil pressure, and temperature gauges.

An expanded engine lineup gave customers six power choices of the six-cylinder or V8 engines; the four-cylinder was available only in the 100. But, for Chevy II enthusiasts, 1965 is best remembered as the year the Chevy II became a muscle car. A 327 cu in (5.4 L) V8 was available with up to 300 hp (224 kW), suddenly putting Nova SS performance practically on a par with the GTO, 4-4-2, and 271 bhp Mustang 289s-at least in straight-line acceleration. Midyear also brought a more potent 283 with dual exhausts and 220 horsepower.

The Chevelle Malibu SS continued to eat away at the Nova SS market: Out of 122,800 Chevy IIs built for 1965 (compared to 213,601 Falcons), only 9,100 were Super Sports. For 1965, Chevy II had the dubious distinction of being the only car in GM's lineup to suffer a sales decline. It is possible that some Chevy II sales were lost to the brand-new 1965 Corvair, which addressed virtually all the problems of the first-generation Corvair, got rave reviews from automotive journals and featured sleek new (Z-body) styling along with a brand-new chassis.

== Second generation (1966–1967) ==
Chevrolet Chevy II; Second generation
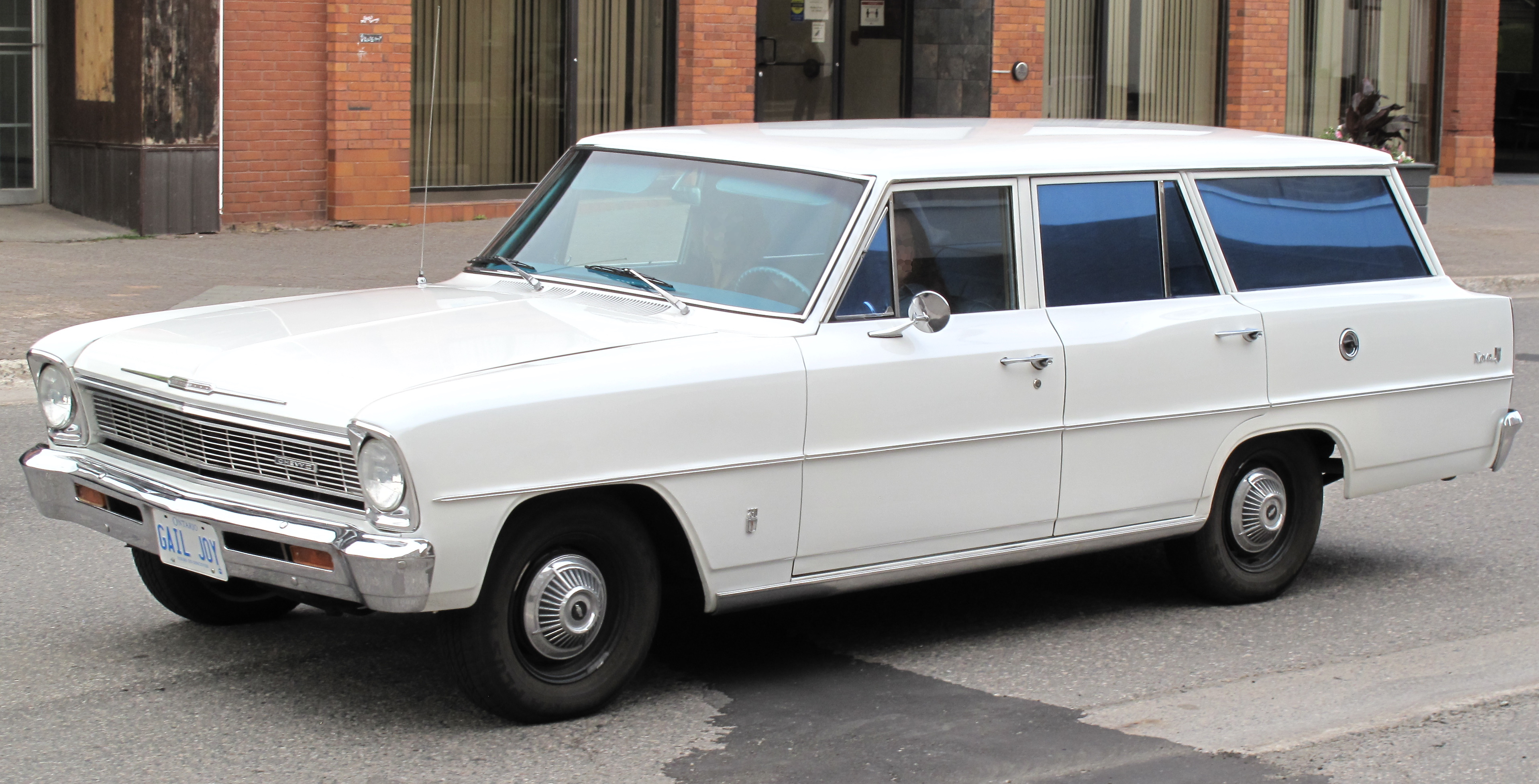
- 1966 Chevrolet Chevy II station wagon

Overview
- Production: 1965–1967
- Model years: 1966–1967
- Assembly: United States: Norwood, Ohio (Norwood Assembly); United States: Ypsilanti, Michigan (Willow Run Assembly); Canada: Oshawa, Ontario (Oshawa Assembly)
- Designer: Clare MacKichan

Body and chassis
- Class: Compact
- Body style: 2-door sedan; 2-door hardtop; 4-door sedan; 4-door station wagon
- Layout: FR layout
- Platform: X-body
- Related: Acadian

Powertrain
- Engine: 153 cu in (2.5 L) I4; 194 cu in (3.2 L) I6; 230 cu in (3.8 L) I6; 250 cu in (4.1 L) I6 (1967); 283 cu in (4.6 L) Small-block V8; 327 cu in (5.4 L) Small-block V8
- Transmission: 3/4-speed manual; 2-speed Powerglide

Dimensions
- Wheelbase: 110 in (2,794 mm)
- Length: 183 in (4,648 mm) Sedan, Coupe; 187.4 in (4,760 mm) Station wagon
- Width: 71.3 in (1,811 mm)
- Height: 55.1 in (1,400 mm) Sedan; 52.8–53.8 in (1,341–1,367 mm) Coupe; 55.7 in (1,415 mm) Station Wagon

1966 Chevy IIs introduced an extensive sharp-edged restyle based in part on the Super Nova concept car. In general, proportions were squared up, but dimensions and features changed little. Highlights included a bold grille and semi-fastback roofline. "Humped" fenders in an angular rear end were reminiscent of larger 1966 Chevrolets, though the 1966 Chevy II and Nova had vertical taillights and single headlights. The lineup again started with Chevy II 100 and Chevy II Nova 400 models.

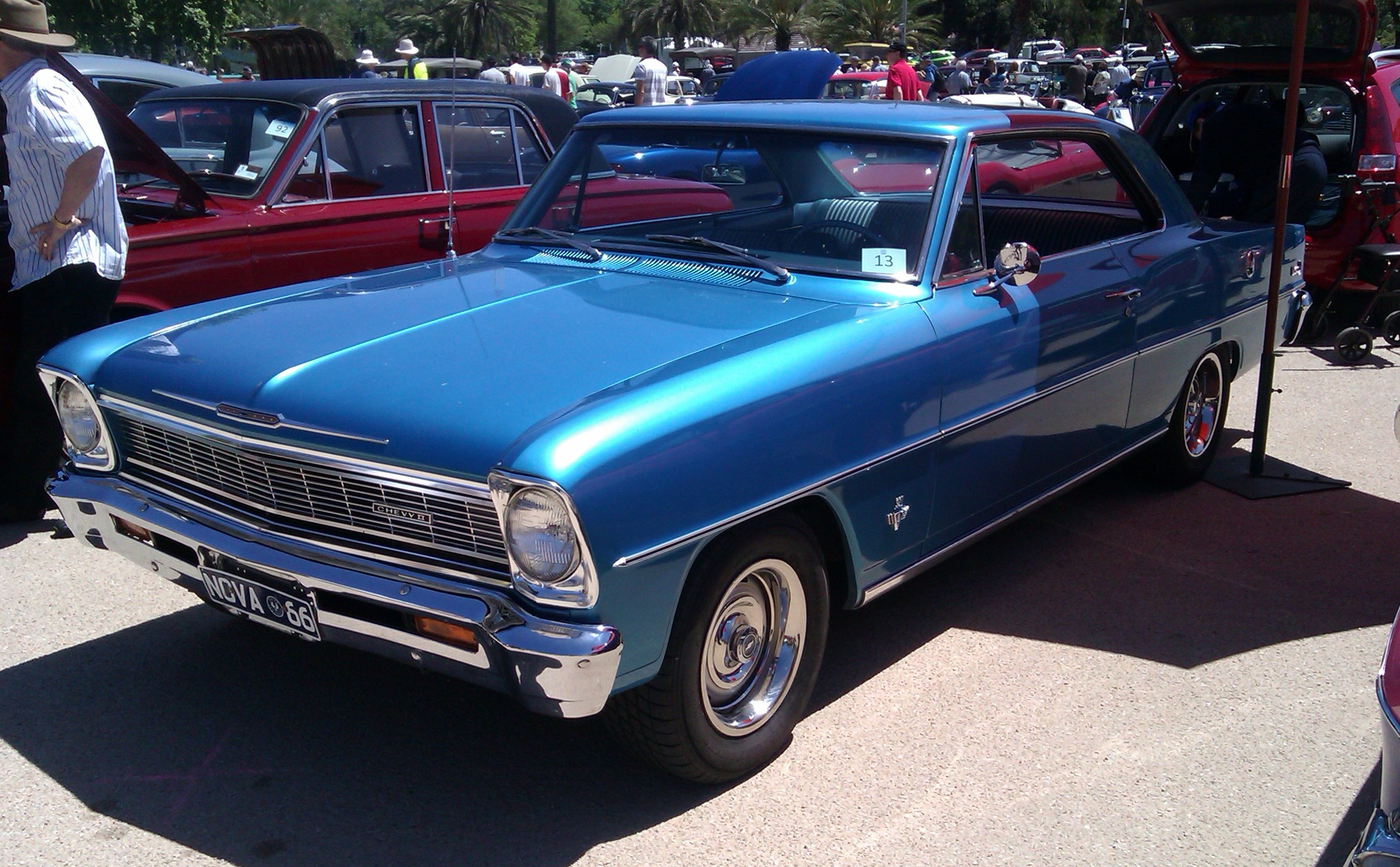
1966 Chevrolet Chevy II Nova Sport Coupe

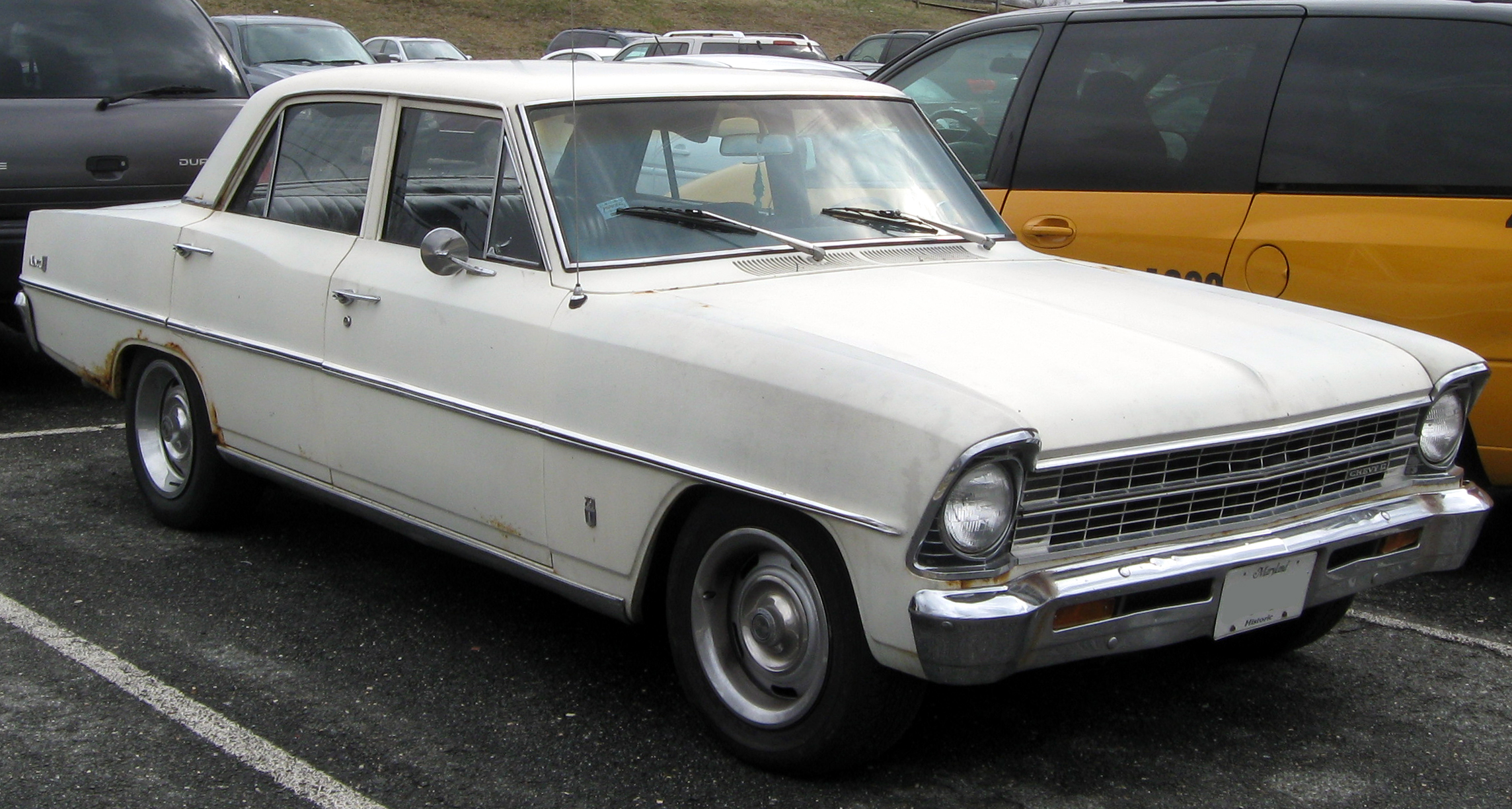
1967 Chevrolet Chevy II sedan

For just $159 (equal to $1,577.77 today) more than a Nova 400, buyers could choose a Super Sport. Available only in a Sport Coupe, the SS was top of the line. The 194 cu in (3.18 L) inline-six was standard on the Super Sport, but any Chevy II (excluding four-cylinder) engine could be coupled with the SS. The SS was visually distinguished by wide rocker panels and a bright aluminum deck lid cove. It had a bright SS emblem on the grille and in the ribbed rear panel, and Super Sport script on the quarter panels. Wheel covers were inherited from the 1965 Malibu SS. Strato-bucket front seats were included, but a tachometer cost extra. The ’66 Chevy II sales brochure clearly promoted the Super Sport as the “Chevrolet Chevy II Nova Super Sport,” but the name "Nova" was not used anywhere on the body. Front and rear emblems displayed "Chevy II SS." In 1967, Chevy II was still the name of the vehicle, but the Nova SS option package replaced all Chevy II badging with Nova SS badging.

The 90 hp (67 kW) 153 cu in (2.5 L) inline-four engine was only offered in the base Chevy II 100 series models. Buyers could also order a 194 cu in (3.2 L) inline-six engine (standard in the SS), a 230 cu in (3.8 L) inline-six, a 195 hp (145 kW) or 220 hp (164 kW) 283 cu in (4,638 cc; 4.6 L) V8 engine, a 275 hp (205 kW) 327 cu in (5.4 L) V8 and the top engine, a new Turbo-Fire 327 cu in (5.4 L) V8 delivering 350 hp (261 kW). This engine was first seen in the Chevelle. This engine with the close-ratio four-speed manual transmission turned the normally mild Nova into a proper muscle car. The Powerglide automatic was not available with the 350 hp engine.

The 1967 models received nothing more than a touch-up after a restyling for 1966. All Novas got a crosshatch pattern that filled the deck lid trim panel. The Nova officially was still called the Chevy II Nova and had overtaken the bottom-rung Chevy II 100 in sales. The Chevy II 100 lacked much in the way of trim or brightwork. 1967 models carried significant improvements in the area of safety equipment. A government-mandated energy-absorbing steering column and safety steering wheel, soft interior parts such as armrests and sun visors, recessed instrument panel knobs, front seat belt anchors and dual brake master cylinders, were included in all 1967 models.

The 1967 Chevy II and its deluxe Nova rendition continued to attract compact-car shoppers, but the Chevrolet Camaro, introduced for 1967, took away some Nova sales. Available only in hardtop coupe form, the 1967 Chevrolet Nova SS got a new black-accented anodized aluminum grille. SS wheel covers were again inherited, this time from the 1965–66 Impala SS. The 1966 "Chevy II SS" badges were replaced with "Nova SS" emblems for the 1967s. Nova versions started with the 194 cu in (3.2 L) inline-six engine but new was an optional 250 cu in (4.1 L) inline-six. Further powertrain options included a 195 hp (145 kW) 283 cu in (4.6 L) V8 and, for $93 more, a 275 hp (205 kW) 327 cu in (5.4 L) V8. Nova SS coupes had a console-mounted shift lever with their Powerglide automatic transmission or a four-speed manual. Other models had a column-mounted gearshift. Compared to the 1966 model year output, sales of the 1967 models dropped by more than a third to 106,500 (including 12,900 station wagons). About 10,100 Nova SS Chevrolets went to customers this year, 8,200 of them with V8 engines. In the Chevy II 100 and regular Nova series, six-cylinder engines sold far better than the V8s.

== Third generation (1968–1974) ==
Chevrolet Chevy II Nova; Chevrolet Nova; Third generation
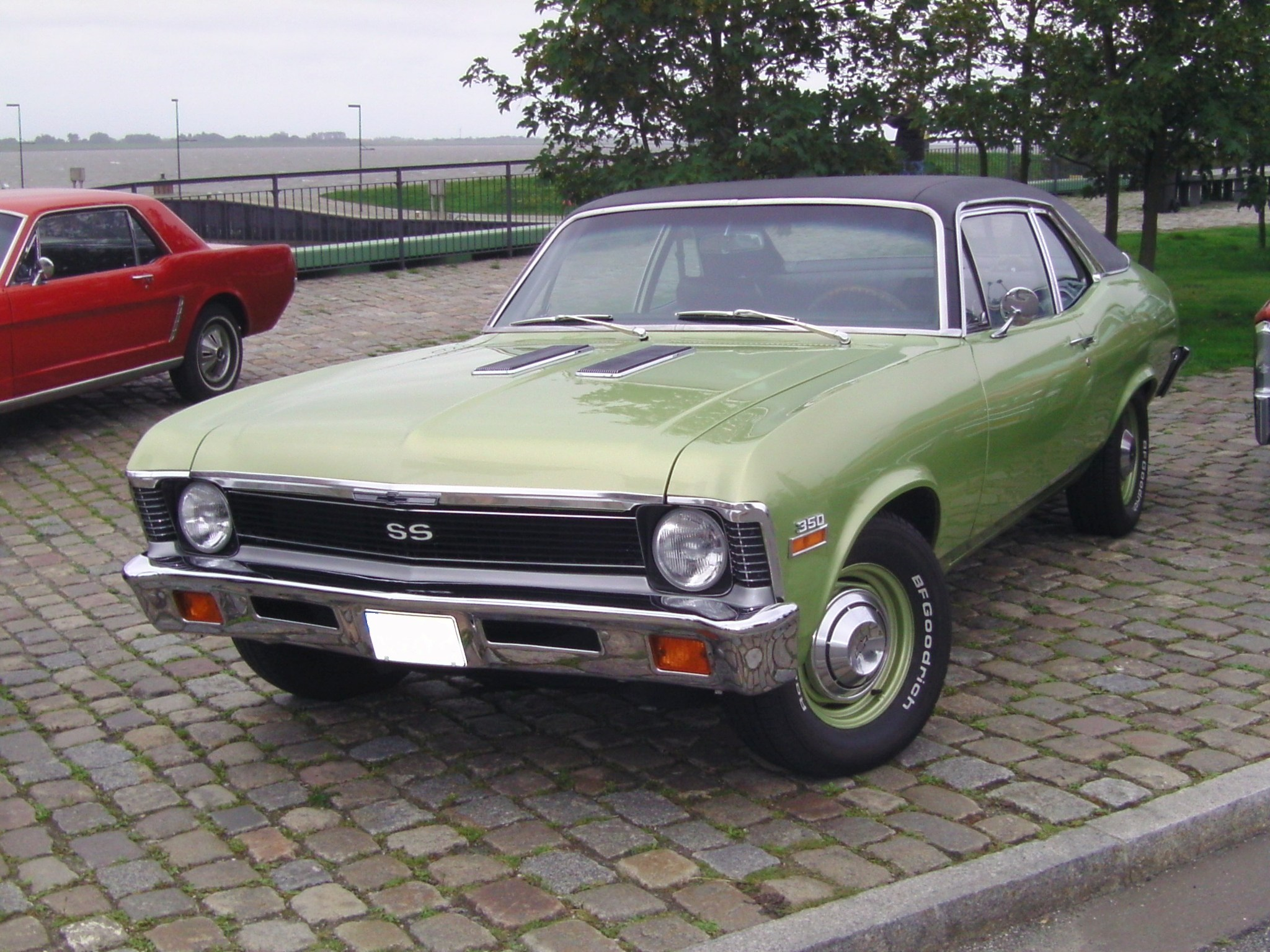
- Chevrolet Nova SS 350 coupe

Overview
- Production: 1967–1974
- Model years: 1968–1974
- Assembly: United States: Leeds, Kansas City, Missouri (Leeds Assembly); United States: Van Nuys, California (Van Nuys Assembly); United States: Norwood, Ohio (Norwood Assembly, 1972 only); United States: Ypsilanti, Michigan (Willow Run Assembly); Argentina: San Martín (GM Argentina); Mexico: Mexico City (1973–1974); Chile: Arica
- Designer: Irv Rybicki, John Schinella, Henry Haga

Body and chassis
- Class: Compact
- Body style: 2-door coupe; 3-door hatchback; 4-door sedan
- Layout: FR layout
- Platform: X-body
- Related: Buick Apollo; Buick Skylark; Chevrolet Chevy Malibu (Argentina); Oldsmobile Omega; Pontiac Ventura; Pontiac Acadian SS (Canada); Pontiac GTO

Powertrain
- Engine: List: 153ci (2.5L) I4; 194ci (3.1L) I6; 230ci (3.8L) I6; 250ci (4.1L) I6; 307ci (5.0L) V8; 327ci (5.4L) V8; 350ci (5.7L) V8; 396ci (6.5L) V8; 402ci (6.6L) V8
- Transmission: List: 4-speed M-20 manual; 4-speed M-21 manual; 4-speed M-22 manual; 4-speed Borg-Warner T-10 manual; 3-speed manual "Saginaw"; 3-speed THM350 automatic; 3-speed THM400 automatic; 2-speed Powerglide automatic; 2-speed Torque-Drive semi-automatic

Dimensions
- Wheelbase: 111.0 in (2,819 mm)
- Length: 189.4 in (4,811 mm)
- Width: 72.4 in (1,839 mm)
- Height: 53.9 in (1,369 mm) Sedan; 52.4 in (1,331 mm) Coupe

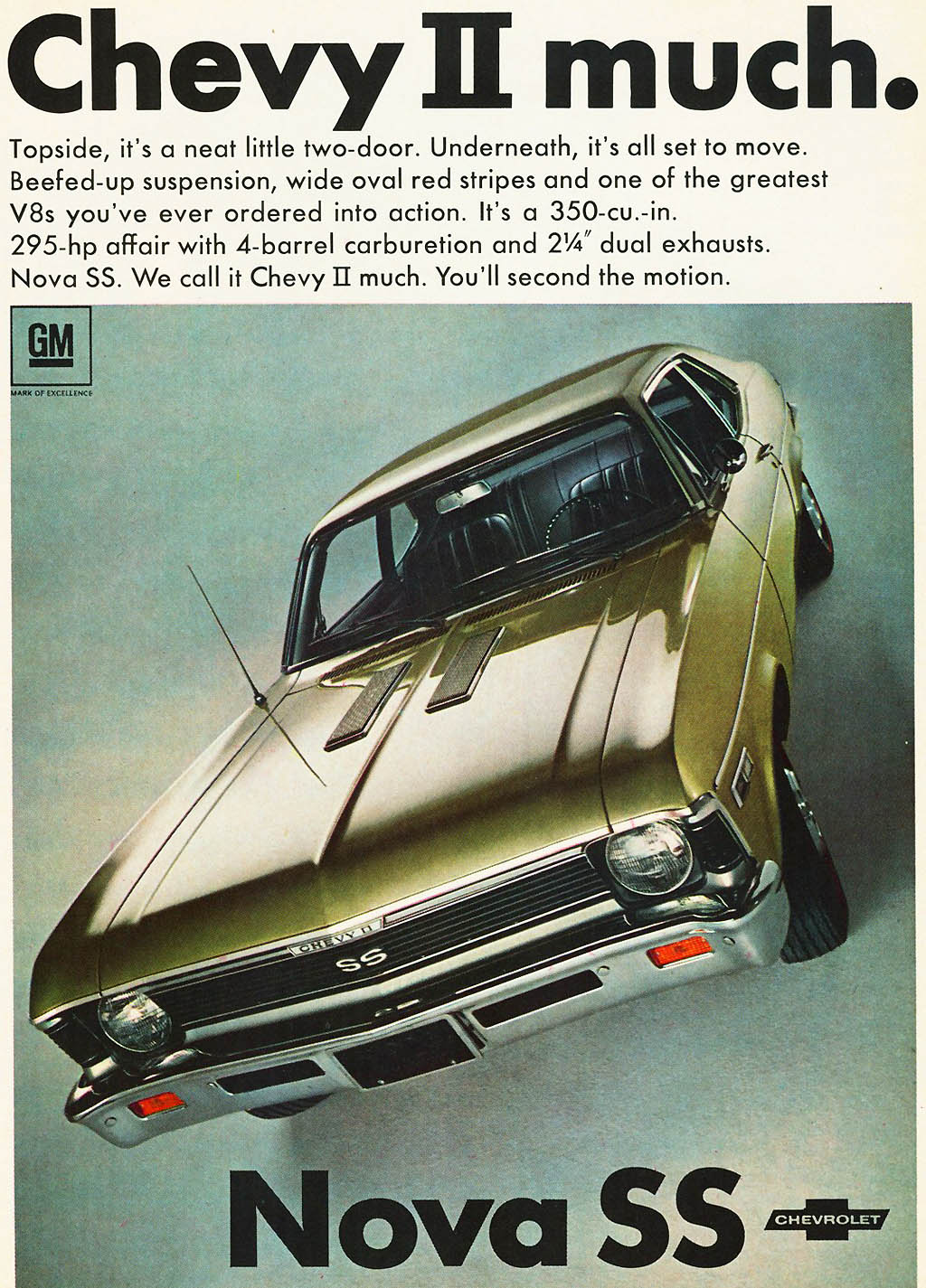
1968 was the last year of the Chevy II Nova nameplate

The 1968 models were fully-redesigned with an extensive restyle on a longer 111-inch wheelbase that gave Chevrolet's compacts a chassis that was just one inch shorter than that of the midsize Chevelle coupe. The station wagon and hardtop sport coupe were discontinued, the former in line with an industry trend which left AMC the only American maker of compact station wagons until Chrysler rejoined the market in 1976 (the 1966–70 Ford Falcon wagon was actually midsize, using a bodyshell identical to the Fairlane wagon's). One notable change was the front subframe assembly — as compared with Ford, Chrysler and AMC, in whose cars the entire front suspension was integrated with the bodyshell, a separate subframe housing the powertrain and front suspension (similar to the front part of the frame of GM's full-size, full-framed vehicles) replaced the earlier style. Although the front subframe design was unique for the Nova, the Camaro introduced a year earlier was the first to incorporate such a design; the redesigned Nova was pushed a year ahead to 1968 instead of 1969. The sales brochure claimed 15 powertrain choices for coupes and a dozen for sedans. Options included power brakes and steering, Four-Season or Comfort-Car air conditioning, rear shoulder belts, and head restraints. There were a few Chevrolet Novas built with the 194 ci (3.1 L), the same engine that had been used in the previous generations of the Chevy II. Sales of the 1968 Chevy II Nova fell by half.

In 1969 Chevrolet dropped the Chevy II portion of its compact car's name; it was now known simply as the Chevrolet Nova. The 153 cu in (2.51 L) four-cylinder engine was offered between 1968 and 1970, then was dropped due to lack of interest (besides its other usage in the Jeep DJ-5A a.k.a. the Postal Jeep or a marine/industrial engine) and to clear the field for the Vega. Far more popular were the 230 cu in (3.8 L) six-cylinder and the base 307 cu in (5.03 L) V8, which replaced the 283 cu in (4.64 L) V8 offered in previous years. Several units were produced with the 327 cu in (5.36 L), 275 hp (205 kW), engine, four-barrel quadrajet carb and four-speed Saginaw transmission with a heavy-duty 12-bolt positraction rear as a "towing option' package. At mid-year, a semi-automatic transmission based on the Powerglide called the Torque-Drive (RPO MB1) was introduced as a low-cost option (~$100 less than the Powerglide) for clutchless motoring. The Torque-Drive transmission was only offered with the four and six-cylinder engines. The two-speed Powerglide was still the only fully-automatic transmission available with most engines, as the more desirable three-speed Turbo-Hydramatic was only available with the largest V8 engines.

=== Nova SS ===
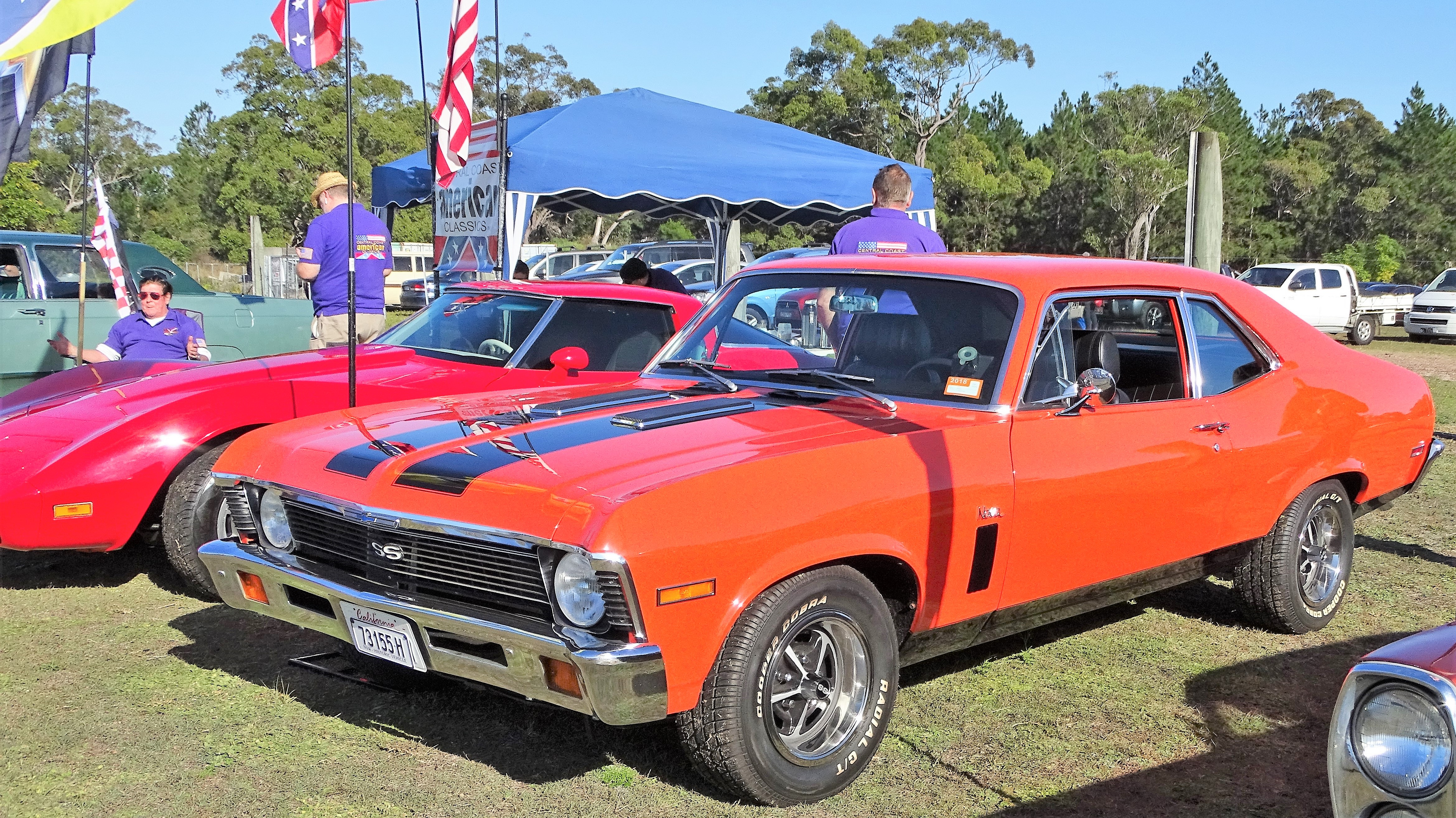
Chevrolet Nova SS Coupé

The Nova Super Sport was transformed from a trim option to a performance package for 1968. One of the smallest muscle cars ever fielded by Detroit, the Nova SS now included a 295 hp (220 kW) 350 cu in (5.7 L) V8 engine along with a heavy-duty suspension and other performance hardware, priced at US$312. Optional V8 engines included two versions of the big-block 396 cu in (6.5 L) rated at 350 bhp (350 PS; 260 kW); and 375 bhp (380 PS; 280 kW) at 5600 rpm and 415 lb⋅ft (563 N⋅m) at 3600 rpm of torque, which went for US$348. Both engines were offered with a choice of transmissions including the M-21 close-ratio four-speed manual, the heavy-duty M-22 "Rock Crusher" four-speed manual, or the three-speed Turbo-Hydramatic 400 automatic transmission. A total of 5,571 SS coupés were produced for 1968. Novas sported the SS badge until 1976. Front disc brakes were optional on the 1968 Nova SS. Strangely enough, also in 1968, and in 1969, Pontiac would have their Canadian division overtake both of the Acadian and Beaumont divisions of General Motors in Canada, and they too would have their own variant of the Nova Super Sport that they referred to as the Pontiac Acadian SS (Super Sport).

=== 1969–1972 ===
For 1969 the Chevy II nameplate was retired, leaving the Nova nameplate. The "Chevy II by Chevrolet" trunklid badge was replaced with "Nova by Chevrolet," the "Chevy II" badge above the grille was replaced with the bowtie emblem, and the 1969 model was promoted under the Nova model name in Chevrolet sales literature.

As with other 1969 GM vehicles, locking steering columns were incorporated into the Nova. Simulated air extractor/vents were added below the Nova script, which was relocated to the front fender behind the wheel-well instead of the rear quarter panel. The 350 cu in (5.7 L) V8 with four-barrel carburetor that came standard with the SS option was revised with a 5 hp (4 kW) increase to 300 hp (220 kW), while a two-barrel carbureted version of the 350 cu in (5.7 L) V8 rated at 255 hp (190 kW) was a new option on non-SS models. The SS option price remained US$312 A new Turbo-Hydramatic 350 three-speed automatic was made available for non-SS Novas with six-cylinder and V8 engines, although the older two-speed Powerglide continued to be available on the smaller-engined Novas. 1969 SS models were the first Nova SS models to have standard front disc brakes.

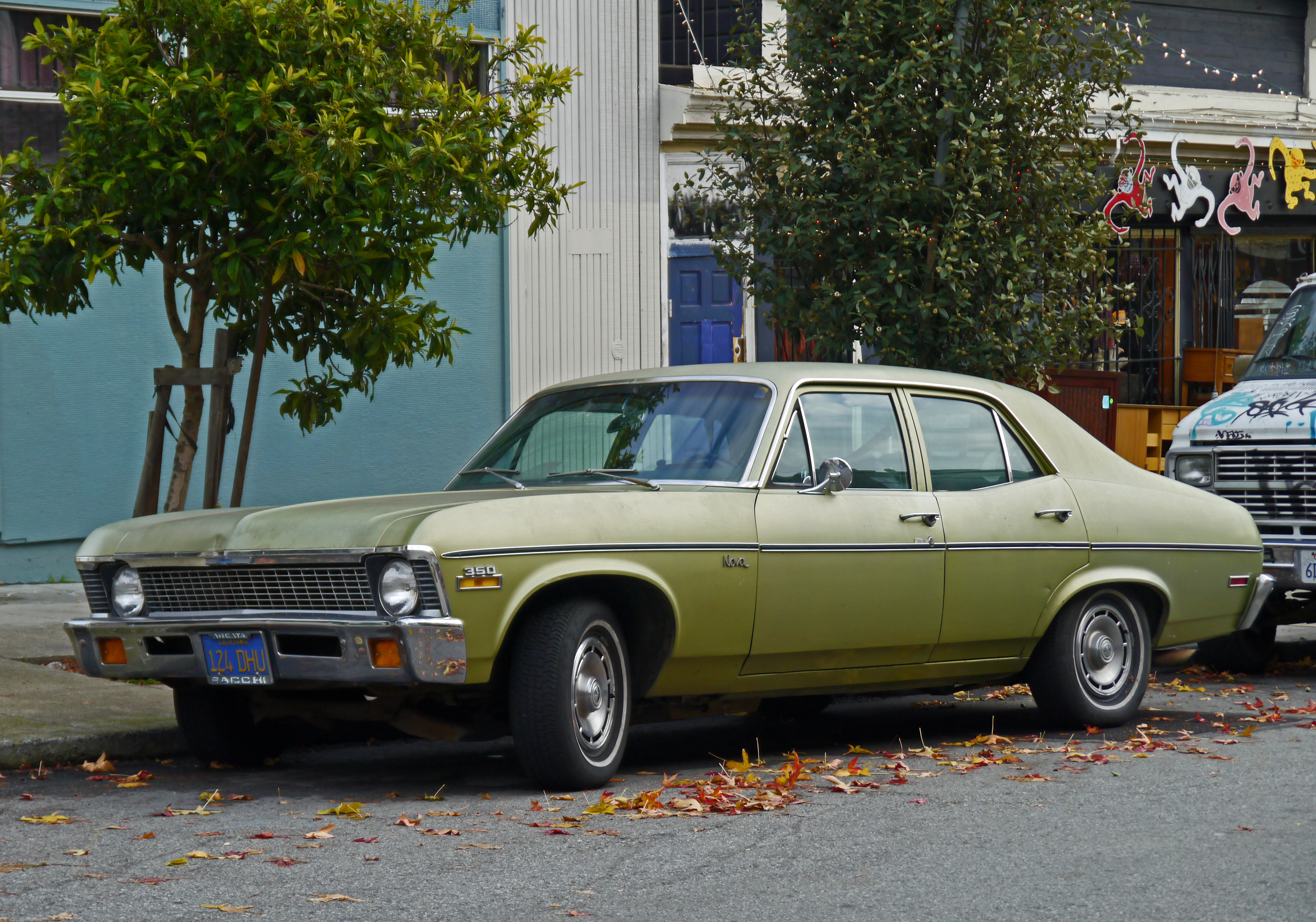
1970–1972 Chevrolet Nova four-door sedan

The 1970 Nova was basically a carryover from 1969. The side marker and taillight lenses for the 1970 Nova were wider and positioned slightly differently. This was the final year for the SS396 (actually, a 402 cubic in. engine now). All other engines were carried over including the seldom-ordered four-cylinder which was in its final year. The car finally became simply the Chevrolet Nova this year after two years of transitional nameplates (Chevy II Nova in 1968 and Chevrolet Chevy Nova in 1969). Out of 254,242 Novas sold for 1970, 19,558 were the SS 350 or SS 396 version. Approximately 177 Central Office Production Order (COPO) Novas were ordered, with 175 converted by Yenko Chevrolet. The other two were sold in Canada. The Nova was used in Trans-Am racing this year.

Year 1971 Novas were similar to the previous year. The 396 cu in (6.49 L) engine was replaced with the 350 cu in (5.7 L) in the SS model. 1971 also saw the introduction of the Rally Nova, a trim level that only lasted two years (until it resurfaced as the Nova Rally in 1977). The Rally kit included black or white stripes that ran the length of the car and between the taillights in the back, a Rally Nova sticker on the driver's side of the hood, 6-slot 14X6" Rally wheels, heavy duty suspension with mono-leaf or multi-leaf in the rear depending on optional equipment ordered., and a "sport" body colored driver's side mirror that was adjustable from the interior. The well-hyped Vega stole sales from the Nova this year, but the compact soon would enjoy a resurgence of popularity that would last deep into the 1970s. A mid-year production change was the front door hinges spot welded to the A-pillar and the door shell, a design shared with the Vega and later implemented by GM's subsequent light-duty trucks and vans which later was used with the S10, Astro van, and full-size trucks commencing with the GMT400 a decade later.

The 250 cu in (4.1 L) six-cylinder engine was now the standard Nova engine with the demise of the 153 cu in (2.51 L) four-cylinder and 230 cu in (3.8 L) six-cylinder engines. The 307 cu in (5.03 L) and 350 cu in (5.7 L) V8s were carried over from 1970 and all engines featured lowered compression ratios to enable the use of unleaded gasoline as a result of a GM corporate mandate that took effect with the 1971 model year.

After 1971, other GM divisions began rebadging the Nova as their new entry-level vehicle, such as the Pontiac Ventura II (once a trim option for full-size Pontiacs to 1970), Oldsmobile Omega and the Buick Apollo. This was considered to build brand loyalty with respective GM divisions although the company later fused their badge engineering with platform sharing to cut expenditures. The initials of the four model names spelled out the acronym NOVA (Nova, Omega, Ventura, Apollo). The 1973 introduction of the Omega and Apollo coincided with the subsequent oil crisis where sales of the X and H platform increased.

The 1972 Nova received only minor trim changes. The Rally package option with heavy duty suspension returned and was a rather popular choice, with 33,319 sold. SuperSport equipment went on 12,309 coupes. Nova production moved to Norwood, Ohio, where it would be assembled alongside the Camaro. At mid-year, a sunroof option called the Sky Roof became available on two-door models. Also, the optional Strato bucket seats available on coupes switched from the previous low-back design with adjustable headrests to the high back units with built-in headrests introduced the previous year on Camaros and Vegas. Despite the lack of change, Nova had its best sales season in years, with the production of the 1972 models reaching 349,733. Of these, 139,769 had the six-cylinder engine.

=== Rally Nova (1971–1972) ===
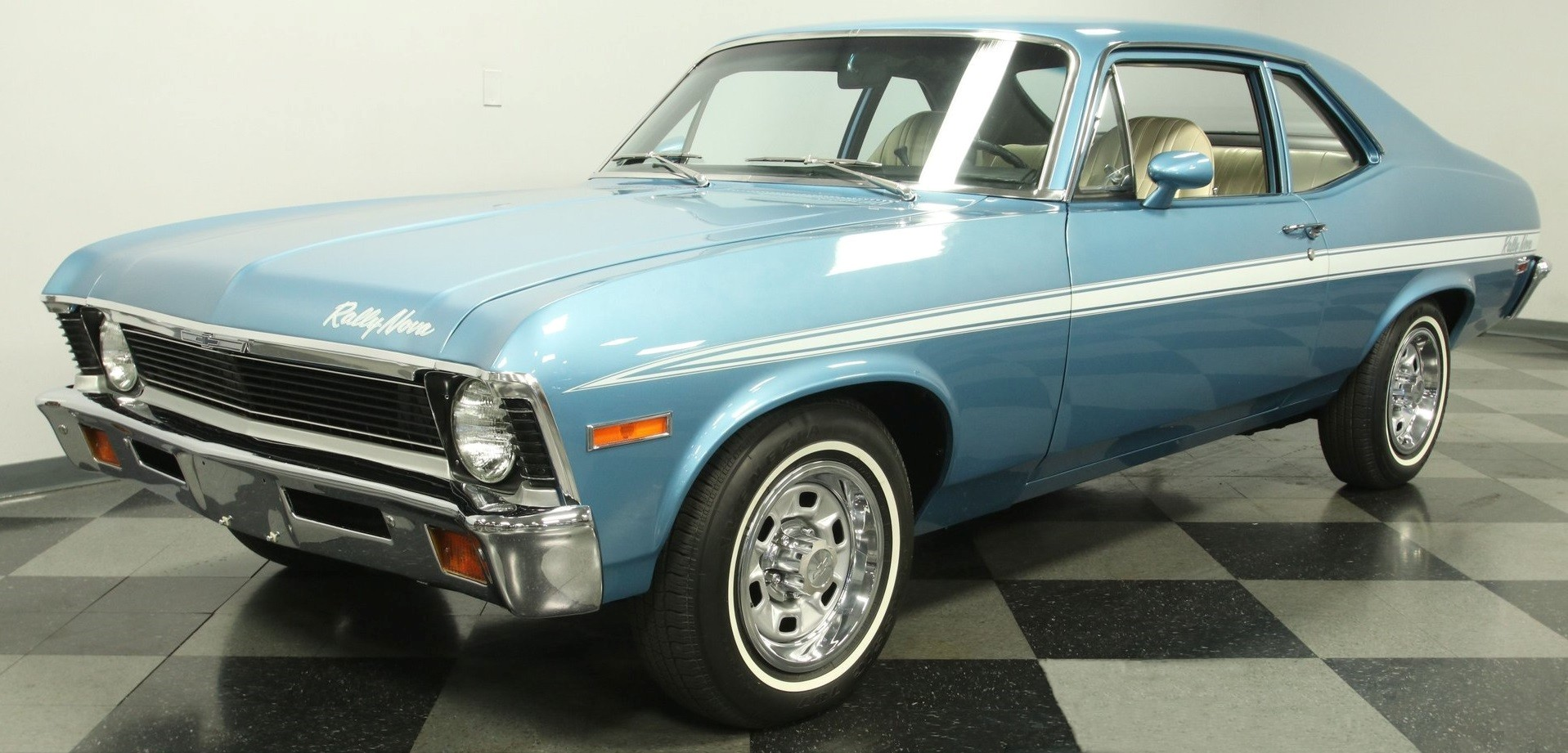
Rally Nova

Mid 1971 saw the introduction of the Rally Nova(RPO YF1) available with the Nova coupe (X27) model only. The Rally Nova option was basically an appearance option but did include heavy duty front and rear suspension (RPO F40) which could be mono-leaf or multi-leaf in the rear depending on optional equipment ordered. The Rally Nova was a would-be muscle car. It had the look of a muscle car with stripes, black grille, left hand sport mirror and 14x6" 6-slot Rally wheels but it could not be ordered with the SS-only 200 hp (150 kW) Turbo-Fire 350 4-barrel V8 (RPO L48) engine. This was done for two reasons, people who wanted the muscle car look could have it without paying for the more expensive Super Sport option. The other reason was because of insurance surcharges that applied to owners of "real" muscle cars. The SS was more expensive to insure because of the 200 hp Turbo-Fire 350 V8 engine.

The Rally Nova option included black or white tapered stripe decals that ran the length of the car with "Rally Nova" wording in the stripes toward the rear of both quarter panels. A stripe decal between the taillights on the back, a "Rally Nova" decal on the driver's side of the hood, 6-slot 14x6" Rally wheels with special center caps, driver's side body colored remote adjustable Sport mirror, black painted grille with bright upper and lower horizontal bars, black accent headlight bezels, bright roof drip moldings and color-keyed floor carpeting.

Available engines for the Rally Nova were the 110 hp (80 kW) Turbo-Thrift 250 1-barrel L6 (RPO L22), 130 hp (95 kW) Turbo-Fire 307 2-barrel V8 (RPO L14) and 165 hp (125 kW) Turbo-Fire 350 2-barrel V8 (RPO L65). Available transmissions were 3-speed manual (RPO ZW4) (all engines), Powerglide automatic (RPO M35) (standard engines only) and the Turbo-Hydra-matic automatic (RPO M38) (V8 only). The Rally Nova only came with 2" single exhaust since the 2-1/4" dual exhaust was reserved for the SS-only 200 hp Turbo-Fire 350 4-barrel V8 (RPO L48).

Optional interior trim levels Custom (RPO ZJ1) and Special (RPO ZJ3) could be ordered. Custom Exterior (RPO ZJ2/YF8) and Exterior Decor Package (RPO ZJ5) were not available when the Rally Nova was ordered. This means bright rear panel trim plate, bright side window moldings, sill moldings, fender moldings, side molding and accent striping would have never come on a Rally Nova. The only allowed exterior options were a vinyl roof (RPO C08), engine badges for 350 engines and for mid 1972 the newly available Sky Roof.

Other available optional accessories and equipment that could be had with the Rally Nova included:

- Sport steering wheel (RPO NK4)
- Vinyl rim steering wheel (RPO NK2)
- Color-keyed floor mats, front and rear (RPO B37)
- Color-keyed seat belts front, shoulder and rear (RPO AK1)
- AM (RPO U63) or AM/FM (RPO U69) radios
- Windshield antenna (RPO U76)
- Rear speaker (RPO U80)
- Clock (RPO U35)
- Special instrumentation (RPO U17) (Required V8 coupe with bucket seats and console)
- Rear window defogger (RPO C50)
- Auxiliary lighting (RPO ZJ9)
- Air conditioning (RPO C60) (with V8 engine only)
- Bucket seats (RPO A51)
- Console (RPO D55) (with bucket seats only)
- Softray tinted glass (RPO A01)
- Trailering rear axle 3.42:1 ratio (RPO YD1)
- Positraction (RPO G80)
- Wheel trim rings (RPO P06)
- Power drum brakes (RPO J50)
- Power disc brakes (RPO JL2)
- E78x14 bias ply belted single white stripe tires (RPO PL3)
- Power steering (RPO N40)
- Front and rear bumper guards (RPO V30)
- Heavy-duty radiator (RPO V01)
- Heavy-duty battery (RPO T60)

Production numbers for the Rally Nova were 7,700 built in 1971 and 33,319 in 1972 of 403,450 total Nova 2-door coupes produced from 1971-1972.

=== Yenko Novas ===
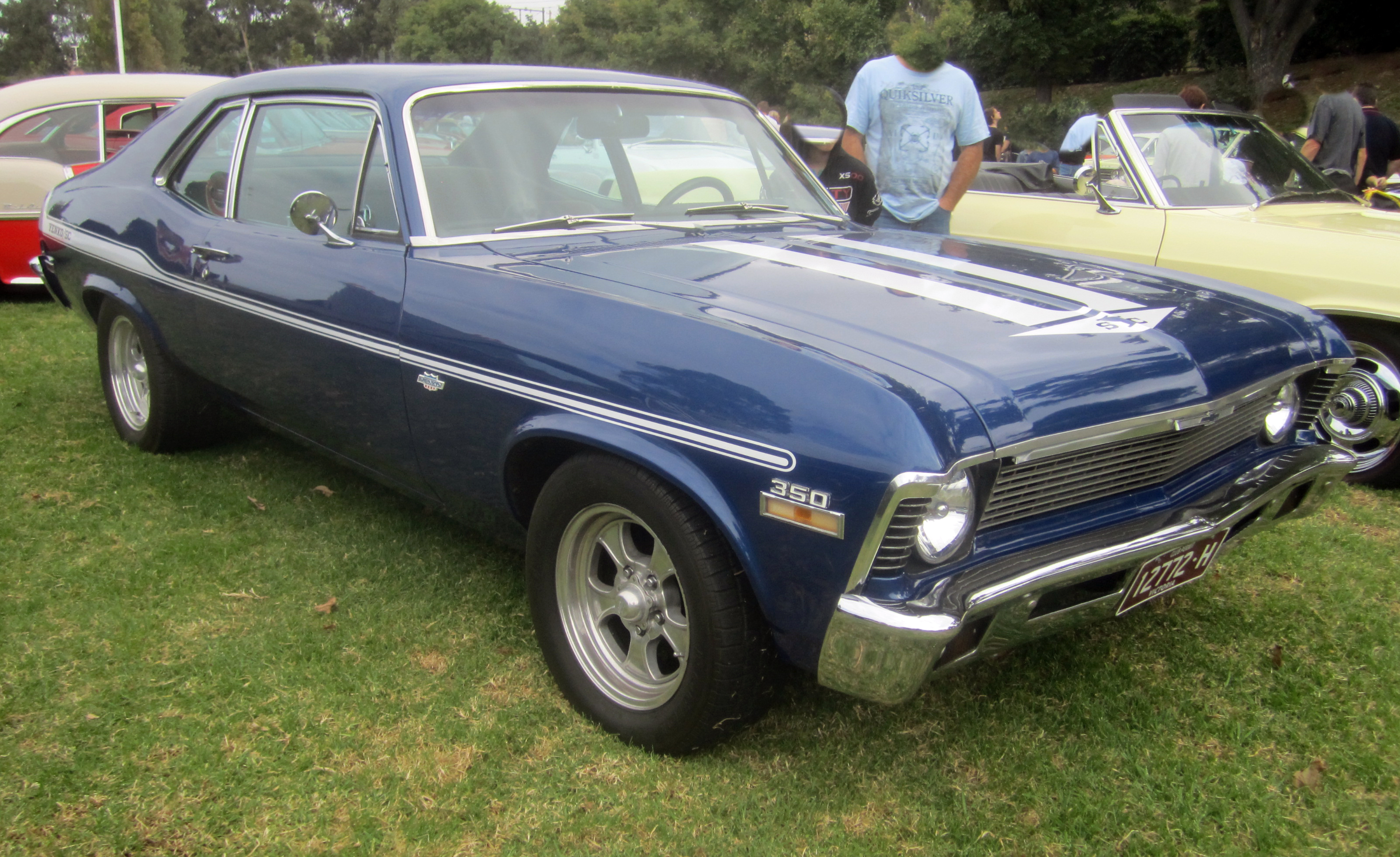
1970 Yenko Nova coupe 350 SC

Retired race car driver and muscle car specialist Don Yenko of Yenko Chevrolet in Canonsburg, Pennsylvania, refitted a series of third-generation Novas, as well as Chevelles and Camaros for optimum performance to compete with the frontrunning Ford Mustangs, Plymouth Barracudas and Dodge Challengers. The specially redesigned Nova (sometimes known as the "Yenko Supernova") had an improved suspension to compensate for the powerful and heavy 427 cu in (7.0 L) V8 engine that powered the Yenko Super Cars. Only 37 were known to be produced with an original selling price of $4,000.00. Today, only seven units are registered and known to exist. In 1970, emissions standards and fuel economy were taking a toll on muscle cars. To counter this, Yenko requested a high-output Chevy 350 cu in (5.7 L) V8 in his special line of Novas, the same engine that the new Z-28 Camaro and LT1 Corvette shared. Additionally, the new "Yenko Deuce", as it was known, had extensive suspension, transmission, and rear axle upgrades along with some very lively stripes, badges, and interior decals.

=== Facelift (1973–1974) ===
The 1973 model year introduced a hatchback body style based on the 2-door coupe. The front and rear of the Nova were restyled, following a government mandate for vehicles to be fitted with front bumpers capable of withstanding 5 mph (8 km/h) impacts and rear bumpers capable of absorbing 2.5 mph (4 km/h) impacts. To go along with the bigger bumpers, stylists gave the Nova a new grille with a loosely patterned crosshatch insert and parking lights located inboard of the headlights. In 1974, the rear bumper could absorb 5 mph impacts. Fuel tank capacity increased to 21 gallons, which required a redesigned trunk pan where a circular section was stamped to house the space-saver spare tire used on hatchback models.

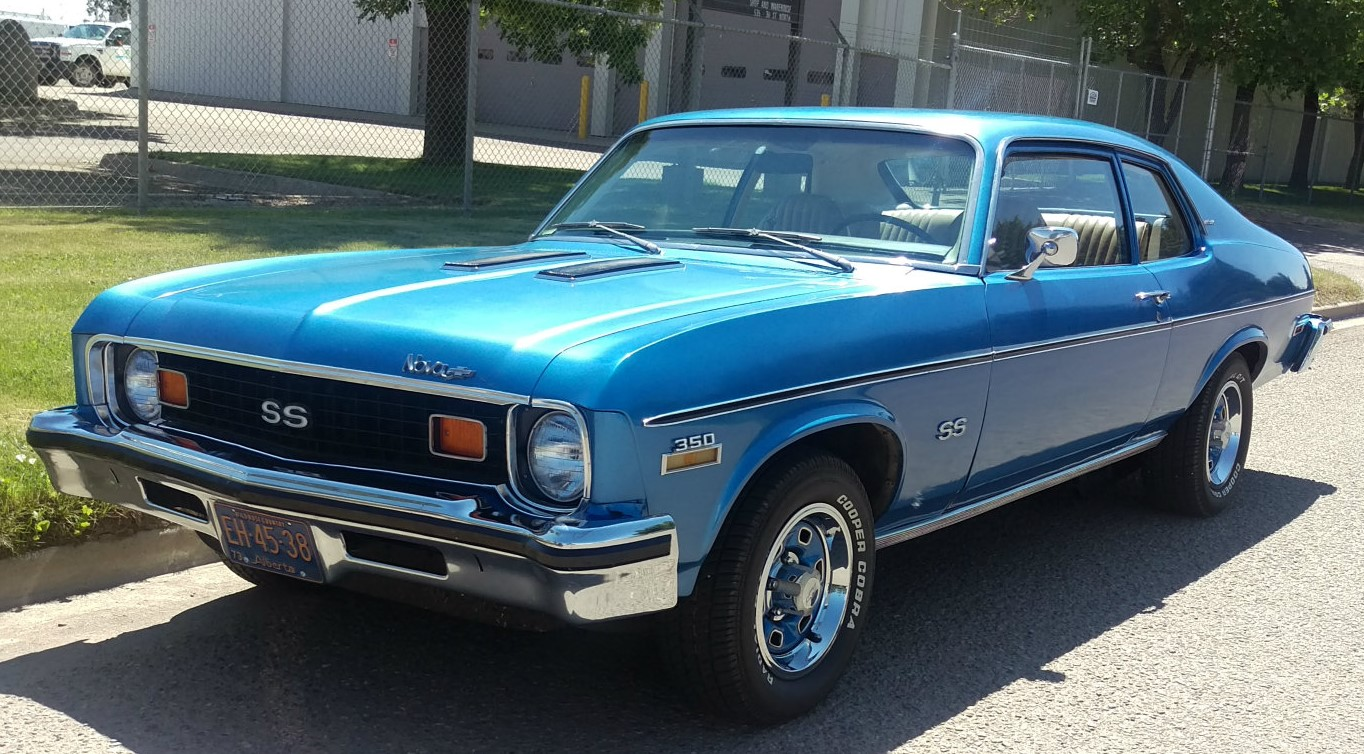
1973 Chevrolet Nova SS

An SS option remained available, but it was merely a $123 dress-up package that included a blackout grille and Rally wheels. It could be ordered with any of the Nova engines. 35,542 SS packages were installed, making 1973 the best-selling year for the option. A modified rear side window shape was also introduced, eliminating the vent windows on both two- and four-door models. A revised rear suspension was adapted from the second generation Camaro with multi-leaf springs replacing the mono-leaf springs used on Novas since the original 1962 model. By this time, six-cylinder and V8 engines were de rigueur for American compact cars, with the 307 cu in (5.03 L) and 350 cu in (5.7 L) V8s becoming fairly common. The 1973 Nova with a six-cylinder engine or 307 cu. in. (5.0 L) V8 were among the last Chevrolets to be offered with the two-speed Powerglide automatic transmission, which was in its final year. A dressy Custom series (which became a mid-level trim package in 1975) joined the Nova line and a Custom hatchback listed for $2,701 with a six-cylinder engine. That was $173 more than the six-cylinder base-model two-door hatchback. Air conditioning added $381. Every 1973 Chevrolet Nova got side guard door beams and additional sound insulation, as well as flow-through ventilation systems. A sunroof could be installed, and fold-down rear seats were available.

For 1974, the Chevrolet Nova got a centered bow-tie grille emblem, as well as modified bumpers that added two inches to the length and helped cushion minor impacts. The Powerglide was replaced by a lightweight version of the three-speed Turbo-Hydramatic 350 ( THM 250 ) already offered with the 350 cu in (5.7 L) V8, which was the only V8 offered for 1974. Nova sales continued the surge they had enjoyed since 1972 and approached 400,000 cars for 1974. Six-cylinder Novas were the fastest gainers, as sales of V-8 Novas declined. These were the years of the first energy crisis as Middle Eastern countries cut back on oil exports. After waiting for hours in gas lines and fretting about the prospect of fuel rationing, thrifty compacts looked pretty good to plenty of Americans and it fit the bill.

The 'Spirit of America' Nova was introduced in 1974. In anticipation of the US bicentennial in 1976, the limited edition Nova Coupes were painted white and featured blue and red accent stripes as well as red and blue interior carpets and fabrics. Oldsmobile and Buick entered the compact car market; both the Apollo and Omega debuted, using the same body styles from the Nova lineup. Additional options were included on these Nova-like models, such as lighting under the dashboard and in the glove compartment. Pontiac's final GTO of this era was based on a facelifted 1974 Ventura coupe, itself based on the Nova, but fitted with a shaker hood scoop from the Trans Am.

Novas and all 1974 cars were fitted with a weight-sensitive relay within the front seat that prevented the vehicle from being started until the driver's seatbelt had been fastened, following a safety mandate from the NHTSA. Later, Congress repealed the mandate requiring this type of device, declaring that it infringed on a driver's freedom of choice, and allowed owners of 1974-model cars to have the seat belt interlock bypassed. The devices were not included in future Nova models. Along with this controversial seat belt interlock, a new, more convenient "inertial reel" one-piece lap/shoulder safety belt assembly was standard for both front outboard passengers, along with a plastic clip attached to the headrest to guide the belt across the wearer's shoulder.

=== Prices ===
Original manufacturers sales prices for the third generation Nova were:

Year	Production	Low Price	High Price
1968	201,005	$2,200	$2,400
1969	251,900	$2,240	$2,435
1970	315,122	$2,175	$2,200
1971	194,878	$2,175	$2,285
1972	349,733	$2,375	$2,400
1973	369,511	$2,375	$2,700
1974	390,537	$2,810	$3,105

== Fourth generation (1975–1979) ==
Chevrolet Nova; Fourth generation
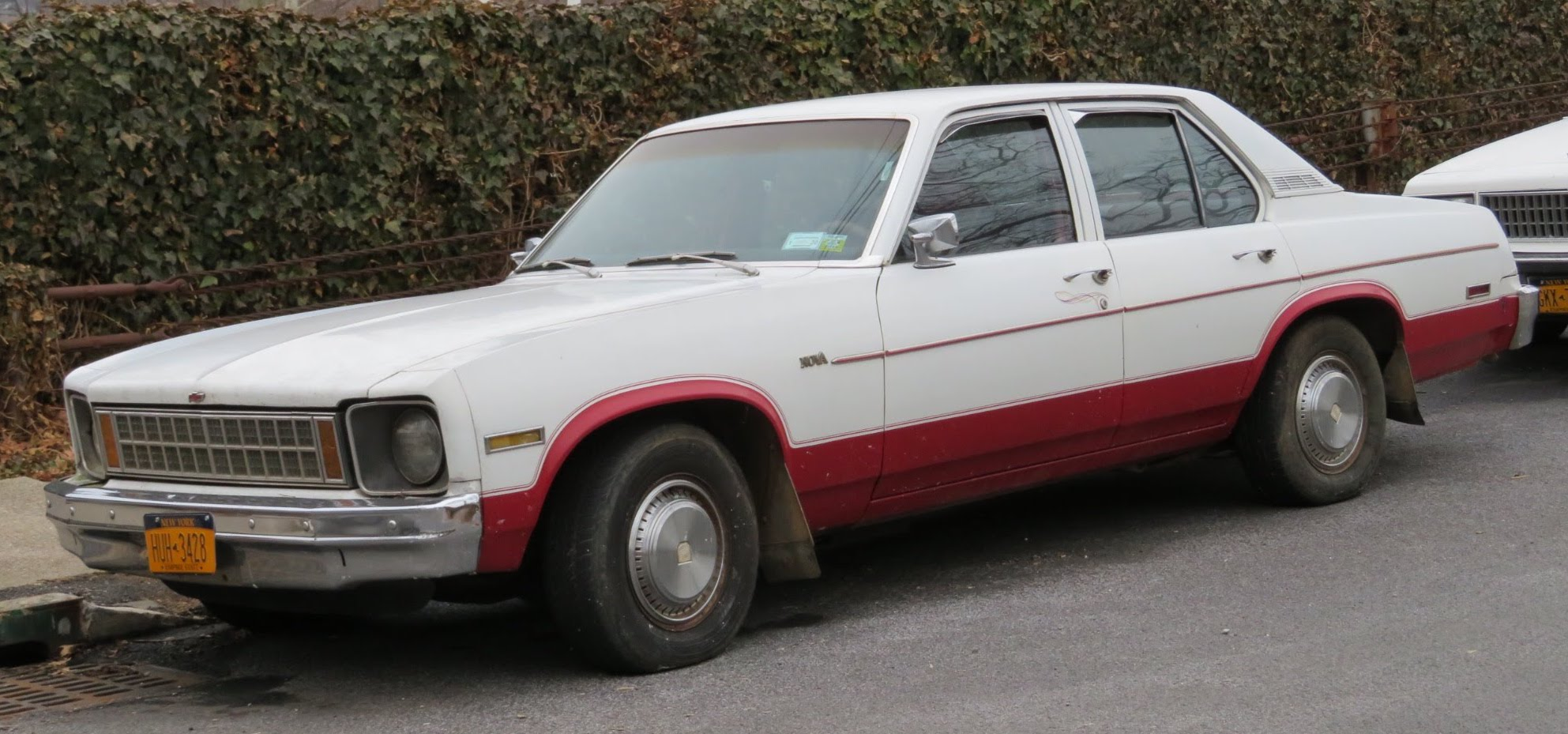
- 1976 Chevrolet Nova sedan

Overview
- Also called: Chevrolet Concours (1976–1977); Chevrolet Iran
- Production: 1974–1979
- Model years: 1975–1979
- Assembly: United States: Leeds, Kansas City, Missouri (Leeds Assembly); United States: North Tarrytown, New York (North Tarrytown Assembly); United States: Van Nuys, California (Van Nuys Assembly); United States: Ypsilanti, Michigan (Willow Run Assembly); Mexico: Mexico City (1975–1978); Iran: Tehran (Pars Khodro)

Body and chassis
- Class: Compact
- Body style: 2-door coupe; 3-door hatchback; 4-door sedan
- Layout: FR layout
- Platform: X-body
- Related: Buick Apollo; Buick Skylark; Oldsmobile Omega; Pontiac Phoenix; Pontiac Ventura; Cadillac Seville (K-platform)

Powertrain
- Engine: 250 cu in (4.1 L) I6; 262 cu in (4.3 L) V8 (1975 only); 305 cu in (5.0 L) V8; 350 cu in (5.7 L) V8
- Transmission: 3-speed manual; 4-speed M-21 manual; 4-speed M-22 manual; 5-speed Borg-Warner T-50 manual; 3-speed THM350 automatic; 3-speed THM400 automatic

Dimensions
- Wheelbase: 111.0 in (2,820 mm)
- Length: 196.7 in (4,996 mm)
- Width: 72.2 in (1,834 mm)
- Height: 53.6 in (1,361 mm) Sedan; 52.7 in (1,339 mm) Coupe

Chronology
- Successor: Chevrolet Citation/Citation II

The 1975 Chevrolet Nova was the most-changed Chevy car for that model year. "Now it's beautiful," said the brochure of Nova's all-new sheet metal, "refined along the lines of elegant European sedans." Chevrolet wisely maintained a visual kinship with the 1968–1974 design, and also retained Nova's efficiently sized 111-inch wheelbase. Front tread grew by an inch and a half, and the front stabilizer bar had a larger diameter. Novas now had standard front disc brakes and steel-belted radial tires. The front suspension and subframe assembly was similar to the one used in the second generation GM F-body cars (the Camaro and Pontiac Firebird), whereas the rear axle and suspension were carried over from the previous generation. Coupes, including the hatchback, had fixed side windows (or optional flip-out windows) - the first for a GM vehicle later optioned throughout the 1980s with its light duty trucks (S10, Astro/Safari, and GMT400 trucks to the K2XX series) and vertical vents on the B-pillar. All Novas now had cut-pile carpeting, formerly installed only in the Custom series. Speedometers had larger, easier-to-read graphics. Windshields offered greater glass area. Front-door armrests were redesigned with integral pull bars. The base model carried the inline six-cylinder 250 cu in (4.1 L), 105 hp (78 kW), three V8 engines (262 cu in (4.29 L), a 1975-only option, a 305 cu in (5.00 L) and a 350 cu in (5.7 L)) for 1976 only, were offered. Mated to a three-speed automatic, 3-speed manual or 4-speed – V8s only – Which remained the norm through the end of the decade (and the end of the rear-wheel drive X platform). By then, Cadillac had developed its own version of the X-body, called the K-body which was named the Seville, whose styling was distinct from those of its corporate cousins, and Buick replaced the Apollo with the Skylark name that had been inactive since the previous incarnation ended production at the end of the 1972 model year.

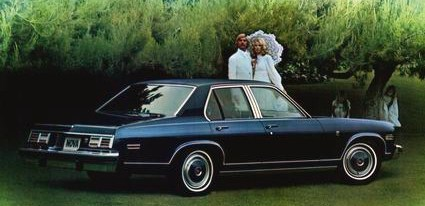
1975 Chevrolet Nova LN

The LN (Luxury Nova) package (which was the top luxury trim similar to the Caprice and Malibu Classic) sent Nova into the luxury portion of the compact market; some actually thought of it as competing against a few high-end European imports. The Nova LN was called "the most luxurious compact in Chevrolet's history," with wide-back reclining front seats that "look and feel like big, soft lounge chairs." LN equipment included additional sound insulation, map pockets, an electric clock, a smoked instrument lens, floor shifter and center console, and a day/night mirror. Taillight lenses have additional white accents unavailable with the base model and a chrome plated grille. Above the front marker lenses, the LN had 4.3 LITER (or 5.7 LITER) decals - making it the first Chevrolet product with metric displacement badges sold in the Americas. Swing-out quarter windows could be ordered for the coupe. "Thanks to LN," the sales brochure announced, "Nova's image will never be the same again." The LN was more Eurocentric as opposed to the Custom which became the mid-level trim option.

For 1976 the Nova LN was rebranded Concours to rival the Ford Granada and the Mercury Monarch, as well as upscale versions of the Dodge Dart and Plymouth Valiant. Like regular versions of the 1976 Nova, the Concours came in three body styles: coupe, hatchback coupe, and four-door sedan. Concours was the most luxurious Chevrolet compact to date. Rosewood vinyl decorated the upper door panels, instrument panel, and steering wheel. Concours models had an upright hood ornament, bumper guards, bright trim moldings, black bumper impact strips, and full wheel covers; more-basic Novas came with hubcaps. The Concours coupe also was the first Chevrolet coupe with a fold-down front center armrest. A V8 Concours coupe sold for $547 more than the comparable base Nova. Engines for the 1976 Chevrolet Nova were a 105-horsepower inline-six, a 165-horsepower 350-cubic-inch V-8, or a 140-horse 305-cubic-inch V-8. 1976 GM vehicles first saw use of the THM200 — from the GM T platform to GM X-Bodies (Chevrolet Nova et al.). A lighter duty, 10-bolt rear differential with a 7.5" ring gear (also used with the Vega/Monza and produced until 2005) was phased into production - being standard equipment with the base inline-six. A "Cabriolet" padded vinyl top was available for Nova coupes. Modest revisions were made to the brakes, and also to fuel and exhaust system mountings. Dashboards contained new knobs. After testing the 1976 Chevrolet Nova, the Los Angeles Sheriff's Department placed the largest order for compact police cars ever seen in the U.S.

The $187 Nova SS option group included a black grille with unique diamond-mesh pattern, Rally wheels, four-spoke steering wheel, and heavy-duty suspension.

Minor changes for the 1977 model year included a more modern round gauge cluster to replace the long sweeping speedometer, and a revised dash panel which changed to a flatter design. Some new colors were offered (as with the rest of the divisions) and some small trim added. A separate brochure was printed for the Concours while the "1977 Nova" brochure detailed only base and Custom versions. The Nova SS previously offered for 1975 and 1976 was discontinued, the option code for the SS — RPO Z26 — continued as the Nova Rally from 1977 through 1979. A badged-engineered Nova Malibu Rallye (1977 and 1978 model years – not related to the USA market Chevelle-based model and based on the Nova hatchback coupe) was sold in Mexico using the RPO Z26 package but fitted with 'Malibu Rallye' graphics and a front grille emblem.

Three engines and four transmissions were available for every 1977 Chevrolet Nova, including Concours. Buyers could choose from a 110-horsepower 250-cubic-inch inline six, a 145-horsepower 305 cubic-inch two-barrel V-8, or 170-horsepower 350 cubic-inch four-barrel V-8. Shifting was accomplished by three-speed (column or floor shift) and four-speed manuals or Turbo Hydra-Matic. Novas might also be equipped with a heavy-duty suspension or the F41 sport suspension. A surprising number of police departments ordered Novas with either a 305- or 350-cubic-inch V-8 engine, following the lead of the Los Angeles Sheriff's Department, which had given the compacts an exhaustive evaluation.

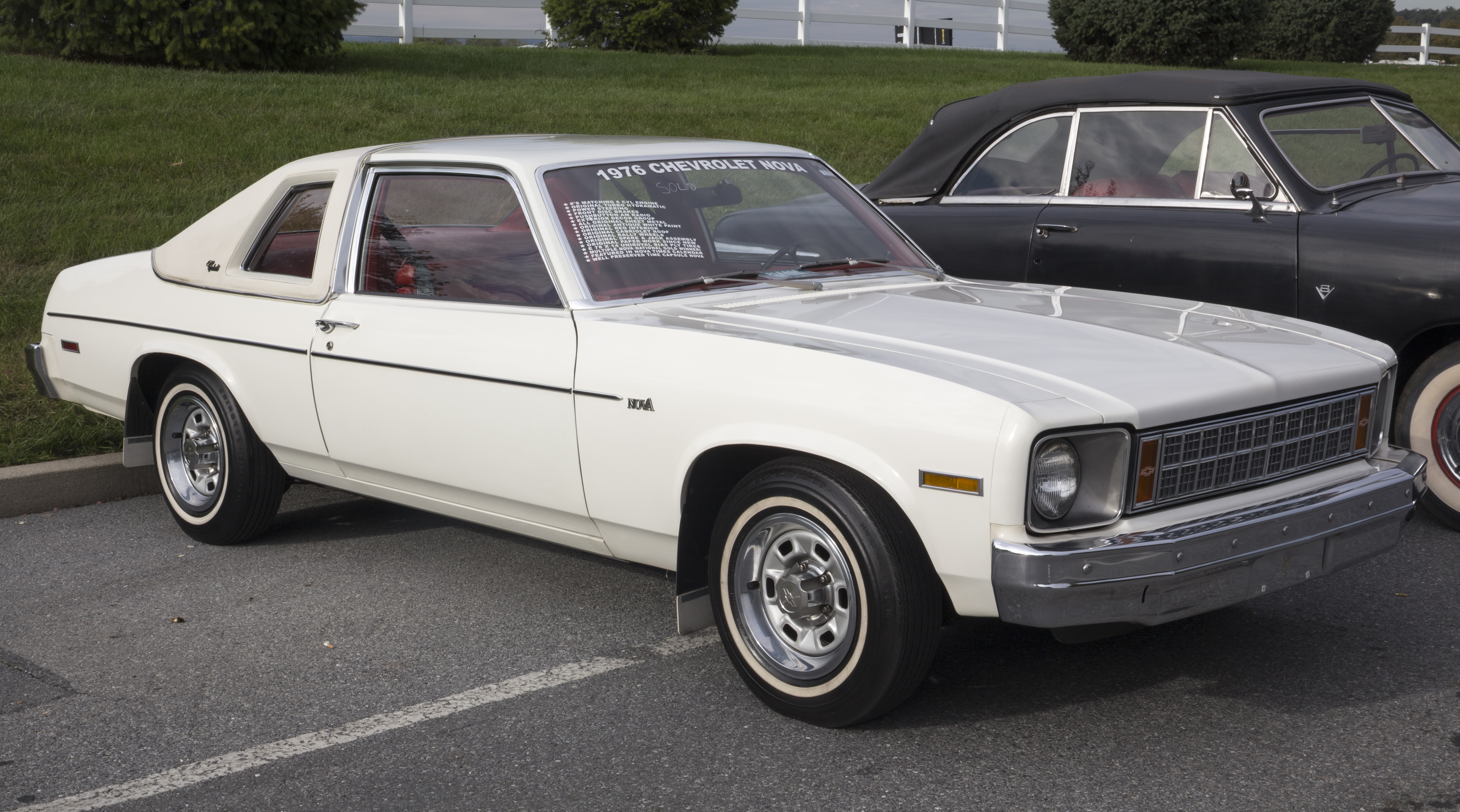
1976 Chevrolet Nova 2-door coupe

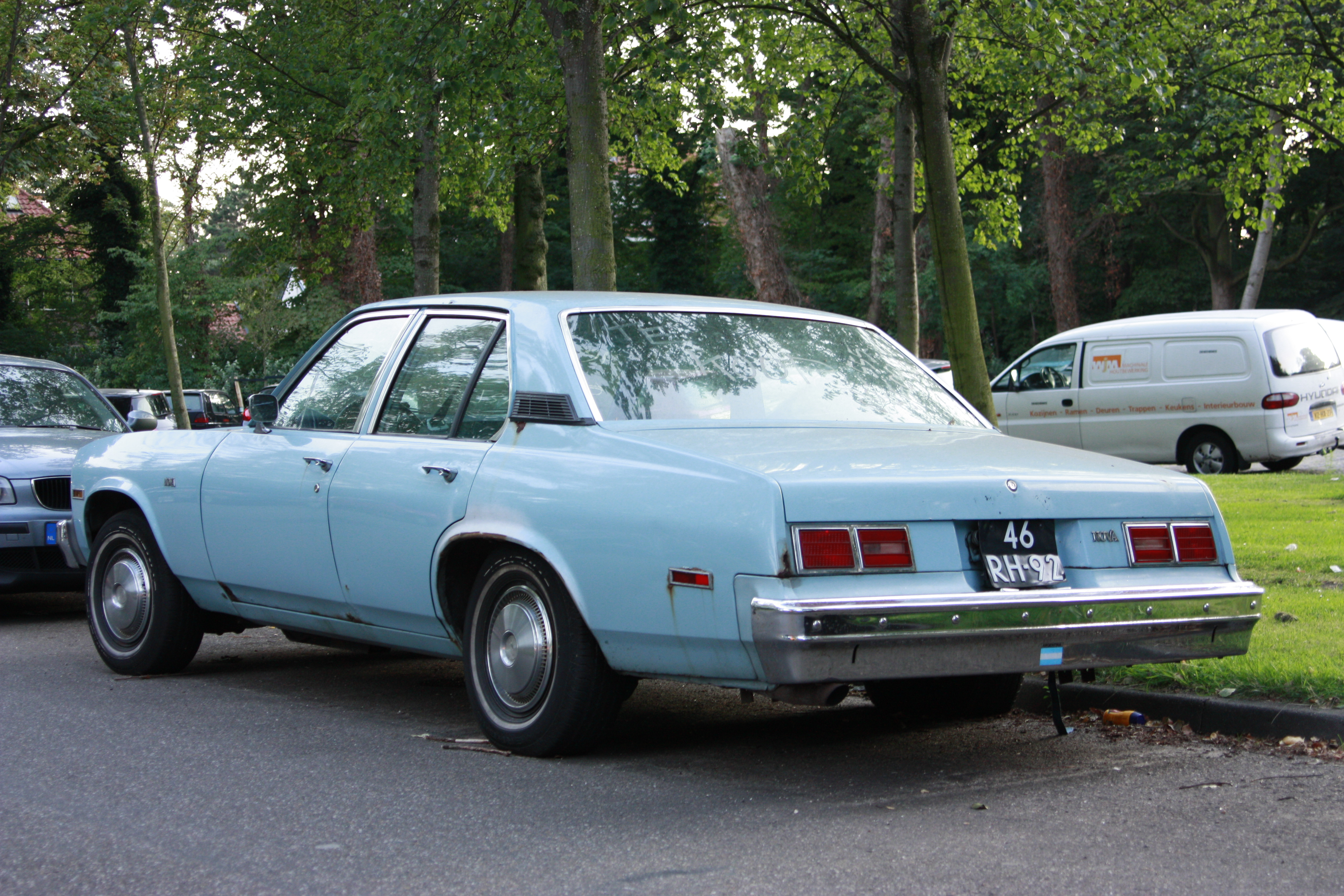
Rear view of a 1976 Nova sedan

Promoted as "Concours by Chevrolet", the 1977 Concours featured a new vertical bar grille and a revised stand-up hood ornament. The rear of the Concours also got new triple unit taillamps reminiscent of the Caprice. It also boasted newly designed wheel covers and wider bright wheel-opening moldings. "International in style, it is American in function," the sales brochure insisted of the Concours. The brochure went on to note that Concours offered a "very special blending of classic style and good sense." That last comment referenced Nova's sensible size. Novas themselves, the marketing materials said, were "not too small, not too big, not too expensive."

For 1978 the Concours was discontinued to clear the way for the newly downsized Malibu, and the Nova Custom inherited much of the Concours' exterior finery but lacked the stand-up hood ornament displayed by the Concours. Upholstery choices included all-vinyl or Edinburgh woven sport cloth/vinyl. More basic versions of the 1978 Chevrolet Nova had the same grille as used in 1976-1977 and added a gold-tinted Chevy bowtie emblem at the leading edge of the hood. For '78 Nova was also available with Rally equipment, which included yet another front-end layout: a diamond-pattern grille with horizontal parking lights and black headlight bezels (basically the 1976-1977 SS grille), plus triple band striping and color-keyed Rally wheels. All Nova drivers faced a new dual-spoke, soft vinyl-covered steering wheel; the same one found in the Caprice and Malibu.

Any 1978 Chevrolet Nova could be ordered with a 250-cubic-inch six-cylinder engine, a 145-horsepower 305-cubic-inch V-8, or a 170-horsepower 350-cubic-inch V-8. Law enforcement agencies in 48 states were driving Novas by now, as the sales brochure boasted. Production dropped almost 100,000 for the model, to 288,000, making Nova the only Chevrolet series to show a sales decline for 1978. Sales of the Nova hatchback body style lagged well behind regular coupes and sedans, and base models handily outsold Customs.

Upon introduction of the downsized GM A-body (later G-body) mid-size cars in 1978, the X-body and downsized A-platform had similar exterior dimensions. The roomier and more modern downsized A-bodies outsold their X-body counterparts.

The 1979 Chevrolet Nova marked the end of the line for the rear-wheel-drive Nova. The front end was revised with rectangular headlights and a new grille for the short run (matching that of its Pontiac Phoenix cousin, which replaced the Ventura for 1977); a modified horizontal-bar grille contained vertical parking lights. New chromed hood and fender moldings were installed, and new front-bumper filler panels gave the front end a more finished look. The Custom went back to the base dual section taillights since the triple section taillights were discontinued. The lineup was the same as in 1978; the base-level hatchback, coupe, and sedan, plus the Custom coupe and sedan. As usual, base coupe and sedan proved to be the best sellers. Nova Customs had a special acoustical package including improved headlining and full hood insulation, along with other luxury extras, while the Rally Package returned, this time using the same grille as other 1979 Novas. These final Novas were promoted for their "solid value" and "reputation for dependability," capitalizing upon a 17-year heritage that had begun with the Chevy II. Fewer than 98,000 examples were produced. Regular production ended on December 22, 1978, but some cars badged "Nova Custom" were built on special order with luxury amenities in early 1979. The final Chevrolet Nova (Custom) built on special order would roll off the line on March 15, 1979, and this would be the end of the rear-drive Nova for good. Chevrolet's compact models were headed into the front-wheel-drive age and for 1980, Nova's place in the lineup would be taken over by the new and very different Chevrolet Citation (the Phoenix, Omega and Skylark carried over to this platform as well, and the Seville was reassigned to another front-drive platform).

== Fifth generation (1985–1988) ==
Chevrolet Nova; Fifth generation
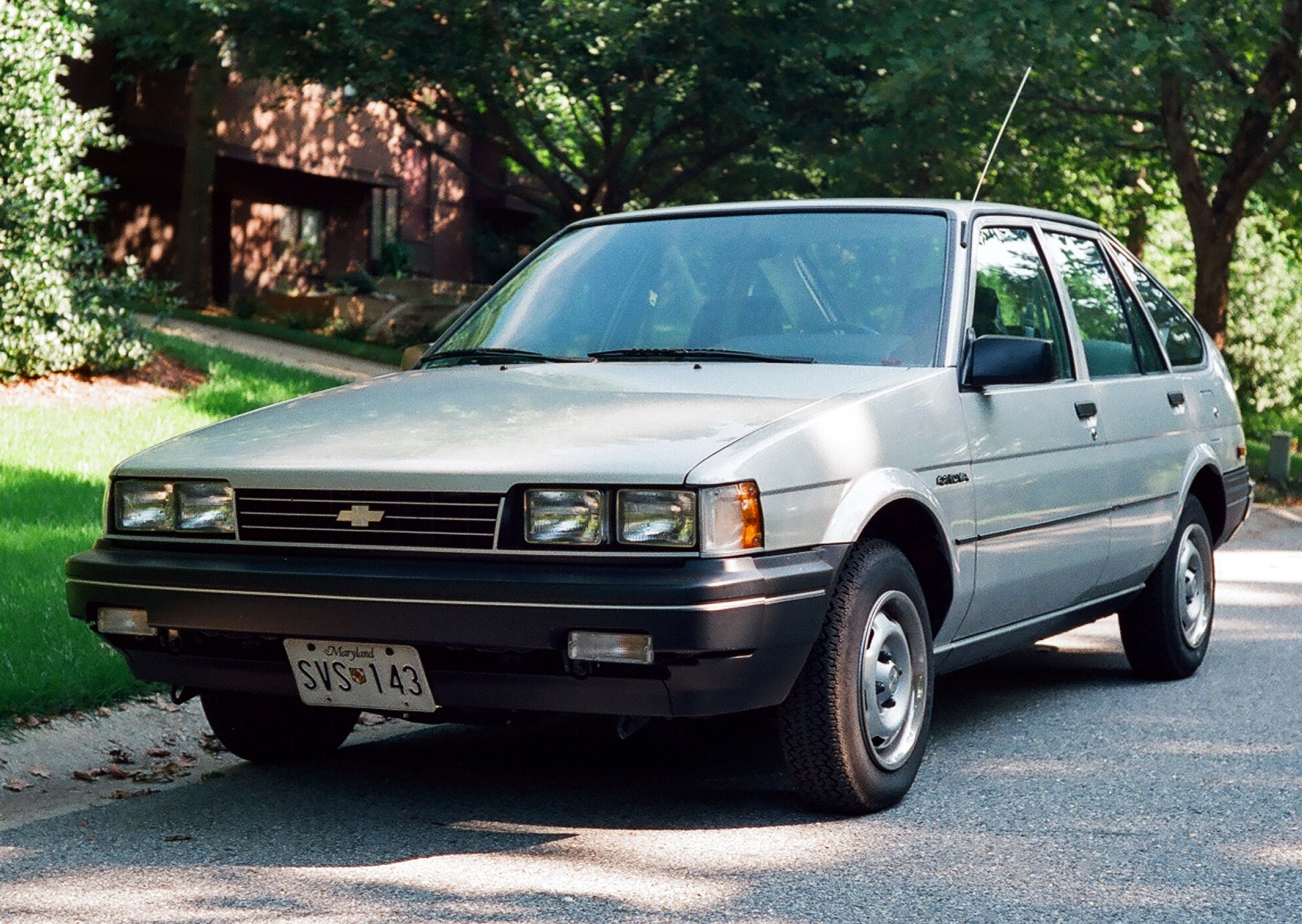
- 1988 Chevrolet Nova 5-Door Hatchback

Overview
- Production: 1984–1988
- Model years: 1985–1988
- Assembly: United States: Fremont, California (NUMMI)

Body and chassis
- Class: Subcompact
- Body style: 4-door notchback sedan; 5-door hatchback
- Layout: Transverse front-engine, front-wheel drive
- Platform: Toyota AE82 Platform (GM S platform as known within GM)
- Related: Toyota Sprinter; Toyota Corolla; Holden Nova

Powertrain
- Engine: 1.6 L 4A-C (LC9) I4 (gasoline); 1.6 L 4A-GE (LW0) I4 (gasoline)
- Transmission: 5-speed manual; 3-speed automatic; 4-speed automatic

Dimensions
- Wheelbase: 95.7 in (2,430 mm)
- Length: 166.3 in (4,220 mm)
- Width: 64.4 in (1,640 mm)
- Height: 52.8 in (1,340 mm)

Chronology
- Successor: Geo Prizm

For the 1985 model year, the Chevrolet Nova nameplate made its return for a fifth generation. In the second quarter of 1984, the smallest-ever version of the Nova made its debut, becoming the first front-wheel drive subcompact to wear the nameplate. The inaugural product of New United Motor Manufacturing, Inc. (NUMMI), a joint venture between GM and Toyota, the Nova was assembled in Fremont, California in a facility shared between the two automakers (designed for manufacturability, NUMMI reached an unusually high level of quality and production speed compared to other US factories).

Known as the S-car by GM, the fifth-generation Nova shared its chassis with the fifth-generation Toyota Corolla (the first to adopt front-wheel drive). However, to distinguish the two model lines, the Nova was styled with the body of the Toyota Sprinter, a Japanese-market variant of the Corolla sold through Toyota Auto Store dealer networks. For the first time ever, the Nova was fitted with quad headlights (as the flush-mounted headlights of the Corolla/Sprinter were not yet legal in the US).

Initially released as a four-door sedan in the American Midwest, a five-door hatchback was added to the model line shortly after its launch, with the line reaching distribution across North America by the fall of 1984 (the traditional beginning of the automotive model year); it was joined by the Suzuki-produced Chevrolet Sprint (launched on the West Coast, replacing the larger Chevette) and the Isuzu-produced Chevrolet Spectrum (launched in New York and New England; between the Sprint and Nova in size).

=== 1985 model year ===
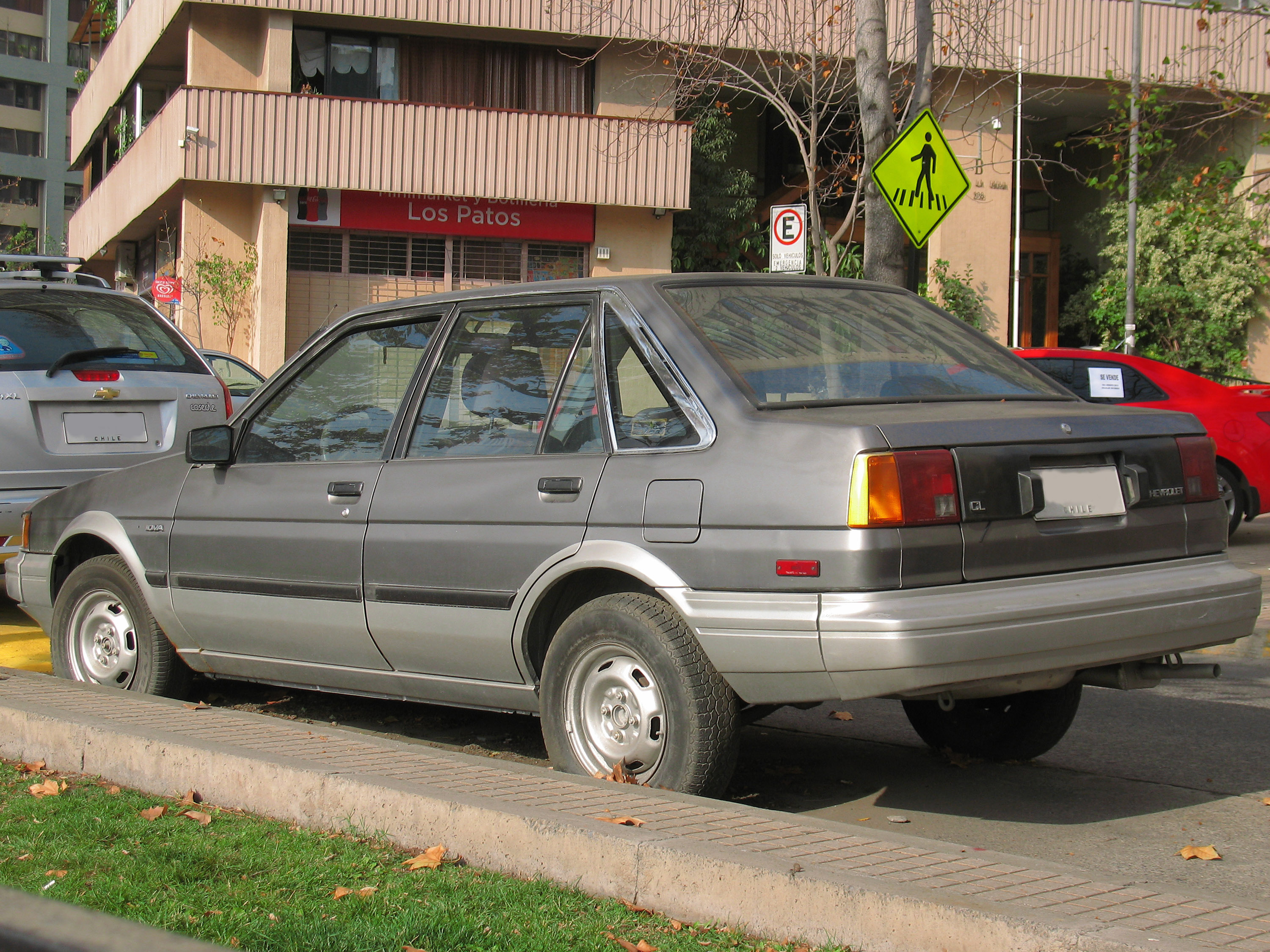
1986 Chevrolet Nova CL sedan

Introduced in the second quarter of 1984 as the largest of the Chevrolet imported car line (though produced in California), the Nova was slightly larger than the Chevette, but smaller than the Cavalier; its 5-door hatchback was a body configuration not offered by the larger model line. Sharing its powertrain with the Corolla, a carbureted 1.6 L inline-4 was the sole engine offered, producing 74 hp (55 kW); the engine was paired with a either a 5-speed manual transmission or a 3-speed automatic.

The four-door sedan listed for $7,435, a rather stiff tariff by Chevrolet standards. The five-door, which added a split-folding rear seat, started at $7,669. All Nova options were grouped into seven packages, which did away with the long list of optional equipment that accompanied cars like the Chevette, which offered nearly 30 options. However, adding one of the costlier packages could easily push the Nova's sticker to over $10,000.

=== 1987 model year ===
For 1987, the Nova saw only minor changes to the exterior, with light silver highlights added to the vertical grille bars and the turn signal lenses changing from amber to clear/white (front) and red (rear). CL-trim Novas received red reflective panels between the taillamps, body-color bumpers, and new aluminum wheel designs.

While the five-door hatchback remained available, the four-door sedan outsold it by a three-to-one margin.

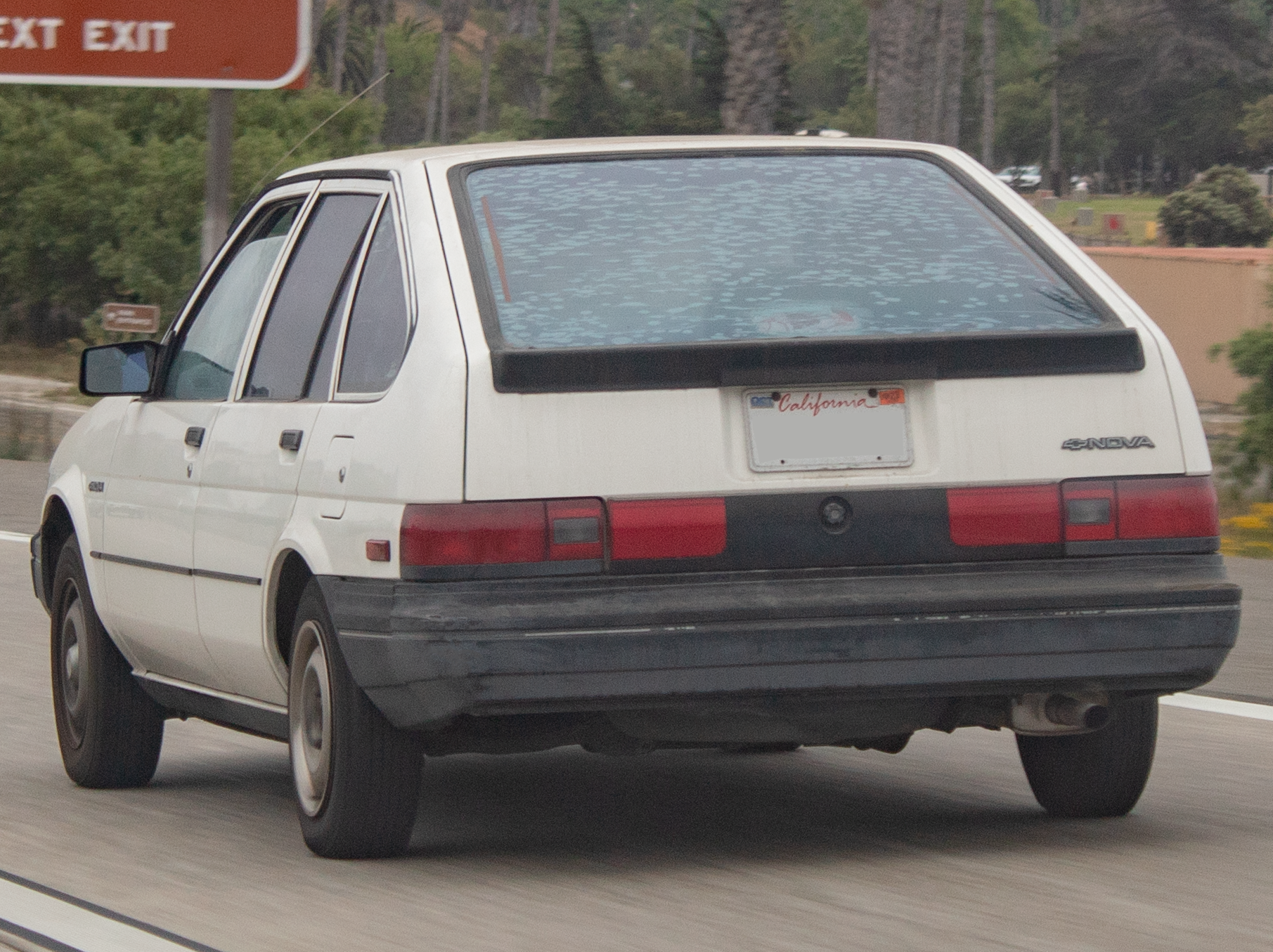
1988 Chevrolet Nova Hatchback

=== 1988 model year ===
For 1988, several functional changes were made to the model line, as the Nova added rear shoulder belts, a rear window defogger, and AM/FM stereo radio as standard equipment.

Chevrolet added a sport-oriented model to the Nova line, introducing the Nova Twin-Cam. Effectively a Nova counterpart of the Toyota Corolla FX-16 built alongside it, the Nova Twin-Cam was fitted with the DOHC version of the 1.6 L inline-4, raising output to 110 hp (82 kW) (an increase of 36 hp, 27 kW). While the 5-speed manual was standard, Twin-Cam Novas were offered with an optional 4-speed automatic (in place of the 3-speed unit paired with the SOHC engine). The Nova Twin-Cam also included fuel injection, sport suspension, power steering, leather-covered steering wheel, tachometer, four-wheel disc brakes, and wider tires on aluminum wheels. The Twin-Cam option package didn't come cheaply, raising the price of the Nova from $8,800 (for a standard model) to $11,395. Along with its high price, the Twin-Cam was offered only in black metallic paint with a gray interior; it was not offered in a hatchback version. Approximately 3,300 Nova Twin-Cams were built.

=== Discontinuation ===
The 1988 model year marked the final use of the Nova nameplate by Chevrolet, as it changed its marketing strategy for its imported vehicles. For the 1989 model year, Chevrolet launched its Geo sub-brand to market its vehicles produced by Toyota, Suzuki, and Isuzu. As the Toyota Sprinter had already undergone a redesign, the Chevrolet Nova was renamed the Geo Prizm for 1989. Geo was an effort by Chevrolet to attract buyers to General Motors that were typically attracted to imported vehicles. After 1997, the Geo brand was retired and folded back into Chevrolet, with the third-generation Prizm (sharing its body with the Corolla) produced through 2002. After 2010, the NUMMI facility was closed (following GM ending its partnership in 2009).

=== Production figures ===
Chevrolet Nova Production Figures
	Sedan	Hatchback	Yearly Total
1985	N/A	N/A	
1986	124,961	42,788	167,749
1987	123,782	26,224	150,006
1988	90,563	18,570	109,133
Total	339,306	87,582	426,888

== Reviews ==
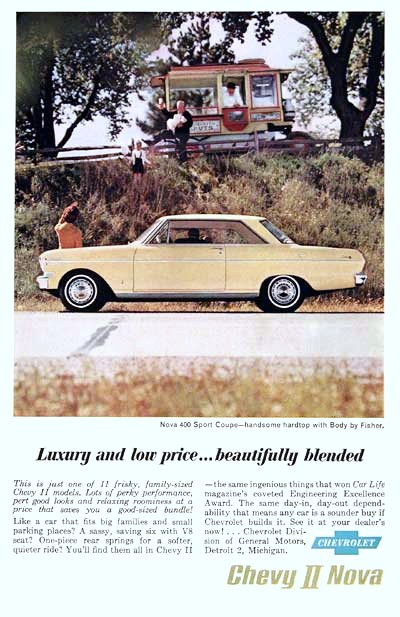
Chevrolet Nova advertisement (1962)

The reaction to the 1962 Chevrolet Chevy II was mainly positive. Veteran Mechanics Illustrated tester Tom McCahill was favorably impressed with a Chevy II 400 Series Nova convertible he drove at a press preview for Chevy's 1962 models, held at GM's Milford, Michigan, test track. "Flat out, which with Powerglide was 91 mph, this little car never wavered and even over some rough strips it was one of the safest feeling 91's I have ever driven." The styling reminded "Uncle" Tom of a "small Mercedes-Benz", and he concluded that "with a little hopping up, a stick shift and its low price, it should sell like cold beer on a hot Fourth of July."

Car Life was even more enthusiastic, honoring the Chevy II with its "Award for Engineering Excellence". "We think the Chevy II, in either 4- or 6-cylinder form, represents an important development in the American automotive field," reported the magazine. "We think it represents a return to sensibility in terms of basic transportation; it is a car of reasonable size, adequate performance and simple elegance." The award was mentioned in a 1962 Chevrolet Nova advertisement. (see right)

Consumer Reports described the six-cylinder Chevy II as an "ultra-sensible, conventional car with outstanding interior space," but also reported "higher than average" interior noise levels. There were also complaints about the four-cylinder version's lack of refinement. "CR hesitates to recommend the Four for normal use. The Four is an excellent hackabout for specialized local use – if you can stand the vibration." McCahill put it this way: "The four wasn't the smoothest four I have ever driven, but it had nice response and will probably still be running long after Castro shaves his beard off." Consumer Reports in 1963: "New last year, the Chevy II has not yet developed into a smooth-riding, quiet, or in any sense luxurious car. It is an easy driving, agile one. By far its most important asset is a body with substantially the room of intermediate cars, but with a very compact silhouette and especially good entrance height."

Motor Trend called the new Chevy II "a most straightforward car – simple, honest and conventional." Editor Jerry Titus was fascinated with the new rear single-leaf suspension: "How it actually works seems almost contradictory. There is a great deal of body roll, but the car does not feel unstable. The ride is soft and pleasing, but not seasick-soft with the constant pitching and rolling that some cars have." Interior room, steering, and brakes were commended. Performance was rated as "moderate" for a six-cylinder Nova convertible with Powerglide: 0-60 came up "a shade under 16 seconds," and the top speed was reported to be 98 mph, but Titus felt that "the car seems at its best below 75, where it did not feel as though it was working hard." The four, meanwhile, took 20 seconds to make it from 0 to 60 mph. In comparison, a 1960 90 bhp Falcon with stick shift took 21 seconds 0 to 60, also according to Motor Trend, while the 101 bhp six introduced for 1961 required 14.3 seconds with stick and 15.2 with the two-speed Fordomatic.

Motor Trend tested a 1964 195-bhp, two-barrel SS with Powerglide, recording 0 to 60 in 11.3 seconds, 18.0 seconds and 75 mph in the quarter-mile, and 100 mph all out. Fuel economy ranged from 12.3 mpg in heavy traffic to 19.6 on the highway. Motor Trend concluded that "By adding a V-8 and bigger brakes, plus detail changes, Chevrolet has made a nice compact even more desirable and a much better performer."

The mid-1980s Nova made no attempt to recapture the former "Muscle" glory that it once had, with the Twin Cam performance variant appearing only in the final year of the nameplate after Toyota had already moved on to the next generation of the platform.

== International Novas ==
=== Canada ===
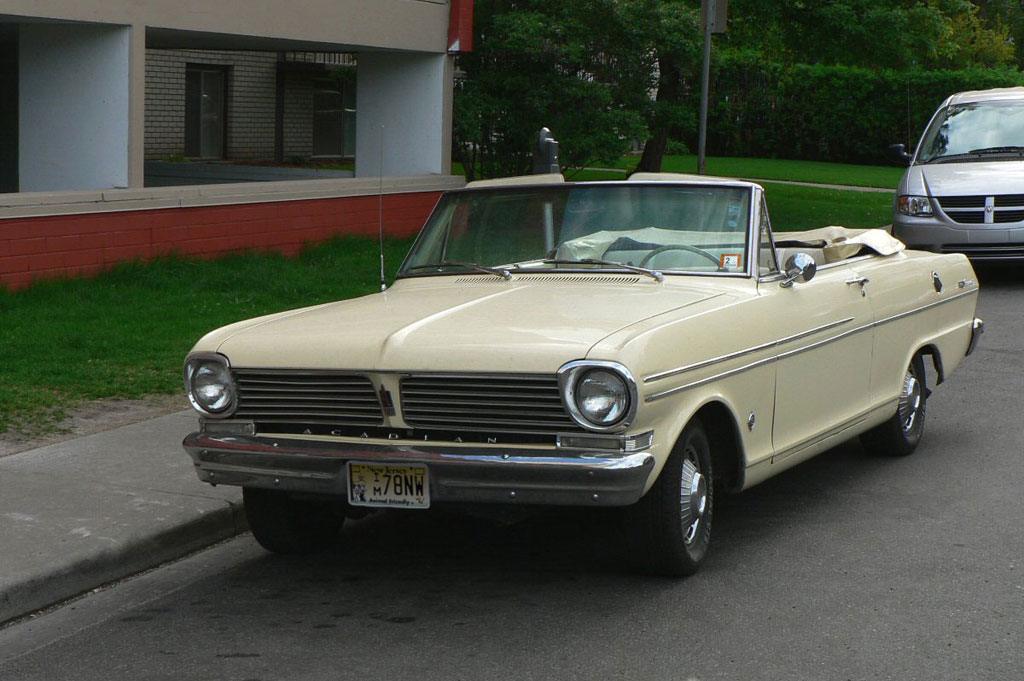
1963 Acadian Convertible

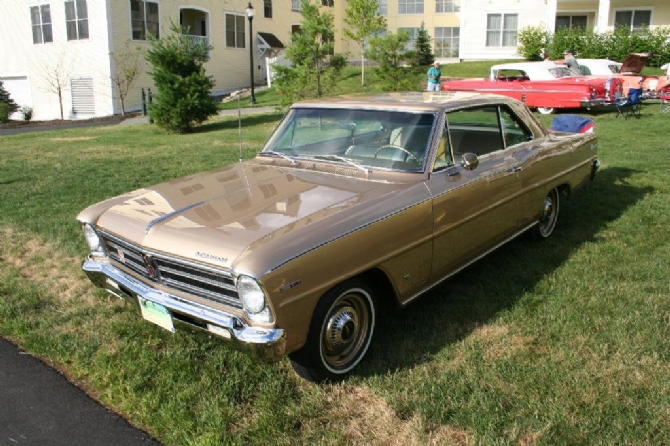
1966 Acadian Coupe

While the Chevy II and Nova were also sold in Canada, from the beginning a mildly re-trimmed version was also sold by Pontiac-Buick dealers as the Acadian.

The Acadian was produced between the years 1962 and 1971. It was a stand-alone make based upon the Chevy II, which was produced in both the U.S. and Canada and sold exclusively through Canadian Pontiac – Buick – GMC dealerships. Due to the Canadian tariffs on imports put into place many years before, there was no compact car available to the Canadian Pontiac dealer. The U.S. built Pontiac Tempest, which started production in 1961 was not available initially to the Canadian buyer – import duties would have made it too expensive to compete in the thrifty Canadian compact market. The Acadian was introduced to give the unhappy Canadian Pontiac – Buick dealer a car he could sell in the growing compact market. During its entire run, the Acadian offered the same body styles as were offered in the Chevy II/Nova, and the cars were virtually the same, save minor trim and badging details.

Originally offered in top-line Beaumont and base Invader trim, the top trim line was renamed Canso in anticipation of the Chevelle-based Acadian Beaumont which would arrive for 1964. A sporty model, the Sport Deluxe (or "SD"), was equivalent to the U.S.-market Nova SS, and it also featured bucket seats, deluxe exterior trim, and special badging.

Base price for the 1966 Acadian was $2,507. The 327-350 hp (L79) was available; 85 were produced. The Acadian line was now down to six models; 7,366 Acadians were sold in 1966. It survived until mid-1971, after which it was replaced by the Pontiac Ventura II.

=== Argentina ===
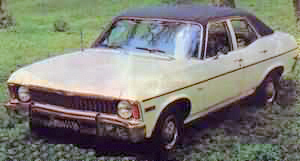
Argentinian Chevrolet Malibu

In 1962 Argentina offered the 1962–1964 Chevy II as the Chevrolet 400 through 1974, and the 1968–1972 Nova as the Chevrolet Chevy from late 1969 through 1978, both models overlapping for several years. An upscale model (Chevy Super) was produced from about 1973 with different trim, front turn indicators and taillights, a much better appointed interior with plastic "wood" trim, named Malibu with no relation to the American Chevelle. All engines were inline-sixes. The first and second generations were available, depending on year and model, with the 194 cu in (3.18 L), 230 cu in (3.8 L) and 250 cu in (4.1 L) engines.

The third generation ("Chevys") were produced with the 230 cu in (3.8 L) and 250 cu in (4.1 L) engines with specially tuned carburetors for sporting models. The "Chevy" metal emblem for the third generation had the same font as the "Nova" emblem of 1968–1974 American Novas, and was, for the first few years, in the rearmost section of both rear fenders. Later, it was moved to the rearmost section of both front fenders, as it was in the American cars from 1969. Sidemarker lights were not mandatory and changed much during the production run, from being deleted, to leaving a small chrome plate, to the same light as in the American cars. Rear deck emblems just said "CHEVROLET" in chrome letters, obviating the typical "Model by Chevrolet" used in the American cars at the time. The hood emblem was similar to the 1969 American Novas: the bow tie, either in blue or just chrome.

Initially, the Argentinian Chevy used very similar trim to the American counterpart, while more luxurious – a "big" car by local standards. They there standard models without accessories and were often used for taxi service. The interior layout remained the American 1968 version for the entire run. The ignition switch remained dash mounted as the U.S.-mandated steering lock was not required in Argentina. Power steering became available at the end of the production run. V8s versions weren't produced: Power windows were not available, tinted windows were darker than American versions, and the darker band on the upper edge of the windshield was not present.

Popular accessories were vinyl roofs, rally wheels, sport steering wheels, bucket seats with high backs, and tufted leatherette upholstery (many sedans were produced this way). Interiors were usually black. Steering wheels and instrument panels were only black for many years, as were seatbelts. American style interior color coordination was absent. The last year of the Nova in Argentina is called locally "Opus 78" (because the slogan of the publicity) and it was the most well-equipped, adding simil-leather bucket seats, air conditioning, power steering, electric antenna, and a new dashboard with integrated central console. During its run on certain models, the "Chevy" was also available with the 3-speed Turbo Hydra-Matic automatic transmission as an option. It was marketed with the name "Chevromatic."

Their Super Sport ("SS") counterparts were both coupés and 4-door sedans. A majority were fitted with inline-sixes with a single two-barrel Holey 2300 RX 7214-A carburetor giving out 168 hp (125 kW), coupled to a four-speed ZF manual transmission. Corsa, a local auto publication magazine, tested a Chevy Coupé SS Serie 2 and obtained a 0–100 km/h (0–62 mph) time of 11.1 seconds.

== Urban legend ==
A popular but false urban legend claims that the vehicle sold poorly in Spanish-speaking countries because no va translates to "doesn't go". However, in Spanish 'nova' is a distinct word primarily used to refer to the astronomical event, and doesn't have the same meaning as 'no va'. In fact, the car actually sold quite well in Mexico, as well as many Central and South American countries. Nova was also the name of a successful brand of gasoline sold in Mexico at the time, further proving that the name confusion was not a problem.

A similar story has been told of the British Vauxhall Nova (a small car that was completely unrelated to the Chevrolet Nova aside from both being built by GM). According to the story, it had to be sold as an Opel Corsa in Spain due to the same alleged language confusion. This version of the story is also a myth, as the Spanish-market version of the car was known as a Corsa from the outset. In fact, the car was called the Corsa in all markets except the United Kingdom.

There was also a Nova kit car designed and built by A.D.D. from 1971. It lost a court case with GM Vauxhall over the use of the name, after it was shown that GM's Chevrolet had a prior claim.

== Bibliography ==
- Adler, Paul S. (1992) The 'Learning Bureaucracy': New United Motor Manufacturing, Inc. School of Business Administration, University of Southern California. Archive.
