= List of Counting Cars episodes =

This is a list of episodes from the reality television series Counting Cars, a spin-off of the series Pawn Stars, which airs on the cable network History.

== Series overview ==
Season	Episodes	Originally aired	
Season	Episodes	First aired	Last aired
1	13	August 13, 2012	September 25, 2012
2	26	April 9, 2013	July 30, 2013
3	26	January 7, 2014	August 26, 2014
4	35	February 24, 2015	September 22, 2015
5	14	February 16, 2016	April 5, 2016
6	24	July 5, 2016	August 16, 2016
7	19	January 28, 2017	October 31, 2017
8	17	July 10, 2018	November 6, 2018
9	10	June 3, 2020	July 8, 2020
10	10	September 15, 2021	December 1, 2021

== Episodes ==
=== Season 1 (2012) ===
No. overall	No. in season	Title	Original release date
1	1	"McQueen for a Day"	August 13, 2012
Featured vehicles include a 1939 Chevy business coupe; a 1968 Ford Mustang GT Fastback (the car used in the 1968 Steve McQueen film Bullitt), which is brought in by Rick and Corey Harrison of Pawn Stars, who acquired it in the episode "Bullitt Proof", not knowing about its problematic interior; and a Harley-Davidson softail whose owner wants it covered in tattoo-style art.
2	2	"Buggin' Out"	August 14, 2012
Featured vehicles include a 1931 Ford Model A Cabriolet hot rod with a DuVall windshield; and a heavily customized Model T that runs on two engines simultaneously, driven by a man named Gordon whose collection also includes a 1973 Dodge Challenger, a 1956 Ford Thunderbird with its original paintjob, a 1979 Chevrolet Camaro Z28, a 1957 Chevrolet, a 1969 Corvette Stingray and a street-legal 1970s Meyers Manx dune buggy with painted flames that Danny wants to purchase in order to give it a new paintjob.
3	3	"G-T-Whoa!"	August 14, 2012
Featured vehicles include a 1967 Pontiac GTO convertible that Danny and Kevin see in the parking lot at the Viva Las Vegas Hot Rod Show; a 1968 Camaro SS 350 that Scott wants to resell but which Danny wants to keep; and a customized 1995 Harley-Davidson Fat Boy cruiser motorcycle with an 18 x 7 inch front wheel and 7 gallon stretch tanks.
4	4	"Buyer's Remorse"	August 21, 2012
Featured vehicles include a 1964 Ford Falcon Ranchero that Danny buys at an auction, whose poor condition later causes him regrets, and inspires Kevin to bet him $500 that he cannot make a profit on it; a 2000 softail motorcycle belonging to Big Ryan's friend Steve that Danny converts into a bobber for a customer who wants skulls painted on it. Also, Scott challenges the quality of Horny Mike's work. Rick Harrison of Pawn Stars has a cameo.
5	5	"Back in the Wind"	August 21, 2012
Featured vehicles include a 1960 Coupe de Ville with red and black pin striping belonging to a patron at Vamp'd, the Bar and Grill that Danny owns; a Harley-Davidson Heritage Softail Classic motorcycle custom-built for a customer who wants to be able to drive it from his wheelchair and take his wife as a passenger; and a 1978 El Camino.
6	6	"Deep Trouble"	August 28, 2012
Featured vehicles include a 1970 Plymouth Superbird; a 1935 Chevrolet hot rod brought in by a friend of Danny's who wants Count's Kustoms to redo the bad paintjob that another shop gave to it, as well as give a matching paintjob to his 1980s Lady Craft, which represents Danny's first-ever boat project; and a motorized tricycle with large rear tires that needs a motor and a dragon-themed paintjob.
7	7	"Satanic Mechanic"	August 28, 2012
Featured vehicles include a 1924 Ford Model T; a rusty, 1971 Ford F100 truck sold to Danny in pieces, on which Danny wishes to mount a stake bed, much to Scott's consternation; a horror-themed 1959 Ford Thunderbird convertible brought in by Cassandra Peterson (a.k.a. Elvira, Mistress of the Dark), which was used in her 1988 film, Elvira, Mistress of the Dark; and a 1970 Type Northwest Ford Torino.
8	8	"Boiling Point"	September 4, 2012
Featured vehicles include a "rough and raw-style" rat rod bike with a 1984 Harley-Davidson Evolution engine and Rat Fink gas tank that Danny has to track down on the street from the man who built it; a 1986 Chevrolet Camaro IROC-Z brought in by a female customer; and a 1972 Dodge Dart with an 800 horsepower engine that Danny test-drives after he sees it sitting in a neighborhood driveway.
9	9	"Politically Correct"	September 4, 2012
Featured vehicles include a patriotic-themed motorcycle customized for fallen troops; a 1973 Plymouth Satellite Sebring Plus for a customer whose inability to pay for it requires Danny and Kevin to make a difficult decision.
10	10	"Maxed Out"	September 18, 2012
Featured vehicles include a 1969 Chevrolet Chevelle SS-396 which Danny acquires, but for which Scott says the shop has no room; a hardtail motorcycle (converted from a Harley-Davidson softtail) in need of parts and welds that Kevin and Horny Mike purchase without authorization, later custom painting it and outfitting it with handmade tailpipes for a customer; and a 1968 Dodge Charger whose owner intends to race in two days, and needs a powerful 514 cubic inch stroker motor for it, which Danny can only find in Bakersfield, California.
11	11	"Ultimate Challenge"	September 18, 2012
Featured vehicles include a 1970 plum crazy purple Dodge Challenger SE (#34 of 46 known to exist), damaged in an accident, which was given to its owner on his wedding day from his wife, who is now battling breast cancer; a rundown, 1968 Chevy short bed pickup truck missing its bed, headlights and door hinges, which angers Scott when its restoration bumps a $30,000 Rolls-Royce hood paint job project in the shop; and a rare, 1963 Chevrolet Corvette split-window with limited-edition Sebring silver paint that Danny and Kevin spot across the street while having lunch.
12	12	"Framed"	September 25, 2012
Featured vehicles include a 1973 Dodge Charger for which Danny may have costly plans; two Chevy Camaros (1969 and 1972 Z28) housed at the same auto repair shop at the Dodge Charger; and a sought-after Atlas bike frame with a 107 Harley-Davidson engine that Horny Mike has found on private property.
13	13	"Searching for Soul"	September 25, 2012
In the season finale, featured vehicles include Barry White's 1979 Stutz IV-Porte, which White's widow, Glodean, wants Danny to acquire and restore; and a 1950 Chevrolet pickup truck whose owner, Shane, wants to present it to his school teacher wife, Tanya, as a gift, but for whom the cost is an issue.

=== Season 2 (2013) ===
No. overall	No. in season	Title	Original release date
14	1	"You Talkin' To Me?"	April 9, 2013
Featured vehicles include a rusty 1964 Ford Galaxie 500 XL that needs work on everything, Danny's plans for which include a $12,000 motor that Kevin and Scott think is overkill; a hot pink 1977 Volkswagen Beetle whose owner expresses an interest in Danny's flatbed; and a 1981 Cadillac Eldorado belonging to a high school friend of Kevin's, who is now a Robert De Niro impersonator that wants the car's top and paintjob to match the car that appeared in the 1995 film Casino.
15	2	"Size Matters"	April 9, 2013
Featured vehicles include a three-wheeled Can-Am Spyder that needs to be modified for Danny's friend, Brian, whose 4-foot, 1-inch height has prevented him from realizing his dream of riding a motorcycle; Danny's 1973 Plymouth Satellite Sebring Plus, which is inspected by a car aficionado couple in a Dodge Challenger RT who turn the tables on Danny by offering to buy it; and a 1986 CJ-7 Jeep missing an exhaust system after its owner brought it to a disreputable mechanic.
16	3	"Soap Box"	April 16, 2013
Featured vehicles include a 1925 Model-T hot rod; an unusual customization job on a soap box derby car belonging to Ryan, a teenaged California racing champion, which inspires Mike to challenge Ryan to an impromptu race; and a custom motorcycle that a pair of customers need to raffle off to a military veteran at the Republic of Texas Biker Rally, which needs to be completed in 60 days.
17	4	"Really Sweet 16"	April 16, 2013
Featured vehicles include a 1970 C10 pickup truck that a customer wants as a surprise gift for his son's 16th birthday; and a Model T fire truck go-cart that a firefighter customer wants built to honor his recently deceased grandfather, who was also a firefighter.
18	5	"Dream On"	April 23, 2013
Featured vehicles include Kount's Custom's Legend car, which Kevin's 17-year-old racer son Devin races, and which needs repairs; a rare, 1979 Dodge Dreamer van/pickup truck hybrid with its original 440 engine that belonged to the grandfather of a friend of Danny's, who wants it restored, but whose chrome work and paint job presents a budget problem; a first generation Monte Carlo; and the Model T hot rod from "Buggin' Out", which has since been outfitted with four blowers.
19	6	"Rockabilly Roadster"	April 23, 2013
Featured vehicles include a 1965 Chevrolet Chevelle; a 1981 Chevrolet Camaro Z28 that catches Kevin's eye; a 1966 Cadillac Coup de Ville that the staff select to give away in a raffle at the Rockabilly Reunion; and a custom motorcycle for a Jill, a customer whose idea for something "a little more hardcore" includes drag bars, black chrome and the red-and-gold color scheme of a favorite bottle of nail polish.
20	7	"To Die For"	April 30, 2013
Featured vehicles include a rare 1960 Chevy sedan delivery that Danny wants to exhibit at the Viva Vegas car show; and a customized coffin couch that men decide to build for Danny to celebrate Count's Kustoms' 15th anniversary. Also, Scott rebukes Mike for working on his own bike while on the clock.
21	8	"Old School"	April 30, 2013
Featured vehicles include a 1970 Mustang that the owner's wife, Tanya (who received a restored pickup truck from him in the episode "Search for Soul") wants restored as a gift to him, but whose problematic quarter panel may make budgeting difficult for her; a 2004 Ford F150 truck belonging to an artist who creates portraits of fallen soldiers, which Kevin investigates with Scott, despite Scott's observation that Danny dislikes working on new vehicles; and a rare Plymouth Road Runner that Danny and Kevin find while out cruising.
22	9	"Muscle Memory"	May 7, 2013
Featured vehicles include an electric blue, 1935 Ford hot rod with a 383 stroker engine that produces 375 horsepower; a 1968 Chevrolet Camaro belonging to a customer who drove 2,000 miles from Grand Rapids, Michigan and shows up without an appointment just as Scott is closing up the shop for the day; and the 1969 Pontiac Firebird that originally belonged to a customer named Larry, which Kevin and Ryan manage to track down, and which needs a full restoration.
23	10	"Count's Cryptonite"	May 7, 2013
Featured vehicles include a black 1969 Chevrolet Camaro built for autocross, which houses a Mast Motorsports LS7 engine that provides 690 horsepower and a T56 Magnum transmission that Danny and Kevin see at the SEMA Show; a Honda 100 Street Bike, which was the first bike Danny's father bought him when he was a child, also seen at SEMA; a 1969 Dodge Charger RT that needs body work; and three of Danny's cars on which Lyle and Beverly Ratner, the couple who bought his Sebring in the episode "Size Matters", make an offer: his red 1959 bubbletop Cadillac, in which Danny got married, the Chevy convertible that belonged to Danny's mother when she dated Danny's father, and his 1932 Ford five window, chop top, highboy coupé. Also, Kevin, who has been covering for Roli's tardiness for a week, has him give a bath to his two small puppies, Ellie May and Tinkerbell.
24	11	"Chumlee's Challenge"	May 28, 2013
Featured vehicles include a 1963 Lincoln Continental sedan with suicide doors brought in two years ago by Chumlee Russell of Pawn Stars (who shows up for the car, despite not having the $5,000 payment), whose exterior primer is discovered to be falling off the metal after the shop agrees to a reasonable price for its completion; a black and gold motorcycle commissioned by Brett Kellerman of the Golden Nugget Casino for the casino's annual bike giveaway at the Las Vegas Bikefest, which incorporates a 1965 Golden Nugget dollar slot machine token, and which will be partially paid for with a crawfish and shrimp cookout for the shop; and a triple white, 1962 Cadillac de Ville convertible.
25	12	"Not So Pretty In Pink"	May 28, 2013
Featured vehicles include a 1956 Volkswagen Beetle with a roof rack and rollback top that features the classic Wolfsburg crest on its hood; a wheelchair customized for a man who lost all four of his limbs in a construction site accident, which the shop customizes with painted, horned fenders and a double-stitched seat; and the 1960 Chevy sedan delivery from the episode "To Die For", whose buyer wanted it painted pink for his girlfriend, but who now no longer wants the car after having broken up with his girlfriend.
26	13	"Day of Judgement"	June 4, 2013
Featured vehicles include a 1962 Chevrolet C-10 that Danny, Kevin and Scott investigate at the tow yard of Kevin's brother, Steve, which shows signs of fire damage; and a 1963 split window Corvette Sting Ray that Scott sees while on the road. Also, Mike's taunts over Roli's experience leads to an impromptu a wrestling match between the two.
27	14	"Psychedelic Cycle"	June 4, 2013
Featured vehicles include a barbecue grill constructed out of two 1932 Ford car grills, or "carbeque" for Davey Deals, the boat customer from the episode "Deep Trouble"; a motorcycle for Michelle Dell, the owner of the original Hogs and Heifers, who wants a 1970s theme that reflects her "sexy, hot, badass barhopper" personality and that of the bar; Also, Scott takes Mike, Roli, Shannon and Grandpa to a racetrack to race Ferraris.
28	15	"Change of Heart"	June 11, 2013
Featured vehicles include the 1932 Ford highboy coupé that Danny sold to Lyle and Beverly in "Count's Cryptonite", which he finds he is unable to part with, due to its importance as the car he built following his father's death; Danny's 1925 Ford T-bucket roadster, which Lyle and Beverly buy instead; a motorcycle with shotgun exhausts, a hand-rolled tank, Trinity headlight and a custom seat that Scott calls an "asskiller", which the shop customizes with a front brake from a sports bike, added chrome, a resealed engine, and a "chameleon" paintjob that changes color depending on the type of light source; and a 1962 red Cadillac de Ville.
29	16	"Super Nova"	June 11, 2013
Featured vehicles include a 1973 Dodge Charger; various cars offered to a customer named Neil who is looking for an unusual 1970s era muscle car, including two in Danny's showroom: the 1966 Mustang that Danny's father purchased when Danny was a child, and Danny's 1967 Pontiac GTO convertible. Danny ultimately restores a 1971 Yenko Chevy Nova for Neil. Also, Danny and Kevin visit the museum of retired demolitions expert Art Goldstrom, which in addition to classic cars, includes such unusual vehicles as a monster wheelchair and a pinstriped toilet mounted on wheels. Danny ultimately buys Goldstrum's 1936 Ford sedan in order to restore it for a customer.
30	17	"One Love, One Car"	June 18, 2013
31	18	"The Marleymobile"	June 18, 2013
32	19	"Floodpocalypse Now"	July 9, 2013
33	20	"The Horn Ultimatum"	July 9, 2013
34	21	"Haunted Hog"	July 16, 2013
35	22	"Zombie Truck"	July 16, 2013
36	23	"Special Delivery"	July 23, 2013
37	24	"Tour de Pants"	July 23, 2013
38	25	"Van Haulin"	July 30, 2013
39	26	"The Car Hoarder"	July 30, 2013

=== Season 3 (2014) ===
No. overall	No. in season	Title	Original release date
40	1	"Electric Ride"	January 7, 2014
Danny restores a 1963 Imperial for Richard Harrison ("Pawn Stars"). Roli starts to learn how to airbrush, and he takes Danny out to buy a 1976 electric Citicar that he wants to be his own build.
41	2	"Ghost Rider"	January 7, 2014
A 1992 ambulance is transformed into a ghost-hunting vehicle.
42	3	"Pimp My Bus"	January 14, 2014
Danny customizes a 1976 FMC motor home and a Harley-Davidson FXR
43	4	"School of Rick"	January 14, 2014
Danny builds a custom lowrider from a 1963 Ford Galaxie.
44	5	"Quadzilla"	January 21, 2014
Danny transforms a 1934 Ford into a hot rod.
45	6	"Roadrunner Recon"	January 21, 2014
Danny makes a couch using the back end of a Plymouth Roadrunner; a sedan is transformed into a muscle car.
46	7	"Pimpmobile"	January 28, 2014
A 1971 Cadillac is featured.
47	8	"GT Oh My My"	January 28, 2014
A 1967 Pontiac GTO is transformed into a muscle car; Danny tries to buy a classic 1951 Mercury Eight from an old friend.
49	9	"Horseplay"	February 4, 2014
A high-wire performer commissions a bike. Also: a showy horse trailer.
48	10	"Get Your Kicks"	February 4, 2014
Danny teams up with Rick Dale ("American Restoration") on an unusual project. Also: a Chevy inspired by the famed Route 66.
50	11	"Mercury Rising"	February 25, 2014
A 1959 Chevy panel truck is restored; the crew compete in a build competition.
51	12	"Rocked and Loaded"	February 25, 2014
A patriotic muscle car is commissioned by country rocker Andy Ross; Roli blackmails Mike.
52	13	"Major League Muscle"	March 4, 2014
Former MLB pitcher Matt Mantei commissions Danny to build a truck.
53	14	"Heavy Metal"	July 15, 2014
Judas Priest visit the shop; Danny buys a 1969 Cadillac.
54	15	"Power and Glory"	July 15, 2014
Danny finds a rare Corvette; a bike is built to honor fallen sailors.
55	16	"Danny Takes the Heat"	July 22, 2014
A 1978 Lincoln is featured.
56	17	"Hog Wild"	July 29, 2014
Danny hosts a car show.
57	18	"Mustang Memories"	July 29, 2014
A 1967 Ford Mustang is restored.
58	19	"Chevys and Shelbys"	August 5, 2014
A 1986 Chevy pickup is featured.
59	20	"Sharon Rides Again"	August 5, 2014
The crew build a motorcycle for a woman who lost one of her legs.
60	21	"Charger Surprise"	August 12, 2014
Danny's 12 favorite cars in his collection are featured in calendar.
61	22	"Count's Calendar"	August 12, 2014
A photo shoot is held for the Count's Kustoms calendar.
62	23	"The Great Car Hunt"	August 19, 2014
The crew search for cars to work on.
63	24	"Van-Tastic"	August 19, 2014
Danny customizes a classic van.
64	25	"Blackjack Bike"	August 26, 2014
The guys build a high-end motorcycle for a casino.
65	26	"Employee of the Year"	August 26, 2014
Danny rewards one of his employees with a car.

=== Season 4 (2015) ===
No. overall	No. in season	Title	Original release date
66	1	"Mo' Parts Mo' Problems"	February 24, 2015
67	2	"Count's Car Show"	March 3, 2015
68	3	"Trail Blazer"	March 10, 2015
69	4	"The Full Monte"	March 10, 2015
70	5	"I Want My Caddy Back"	March 17, 2015
71	6	"The King and the Count"	March 17, 2015
72	7	"Road Runner Redemption"	March 24, 2015
73	8	"Willys for Warriors"	March 24, 2015
74	9	"The Return of the Big Twin"	March 31, 2015
75	10	"It Hurst So Good"	March 31, 2015
76	11	"Burning Out"	June 23, 2015
77	12	"Don't Tell Danny"	June 23, 2015
78	13	"The Count of Monte Carlo"	June 30, 2015
79	14	"Stude-Licious"	June 30, 2015
80	15	"Bucks & Broncos, Part 1"	July 7, 2015
81	16	"Bucks & Broncos, Part 2"	July 7, 2015
82	17	"A Legend on Two Wheels"	July 14, 2015
83	18	"Black, White and Hotrod All Over"	July 14, 2015
84	19	"Fighting Ford, Part 1"	July 21, 2015
85	20	"Fighting Ford, Part 2"	July 21, 2015
86	21	"Craziest Rides"	July 28, 2015
87	22	"Fast and Furry-ous"	July 28, 2015
88	23	"Pullovers"	August 4, 2015
89	24	"Down By The Riviera"	August 4, 2015
90	25	"Special Projects"	August 11, 2015
91	26	"Firebird Fever"	August 11, 2015
92	27	"You Never Forget Your First Z28, Part 1"	August 18, 2015
93	28	"You Never Forget Your First Z28, Part 2"	August 18, 2015
94	29	"Dannys Dream Kevins Nightmare"	August 25, 2015
95	30	"Baggers cant be Choosers"	August 3, 2015
96	31	"Dune Buggy Blues"	September 1, 2015
97	32	"Ready Set Van Gogh"	September 1, 2015
98	33	"Flamin and Misbehavin"	September 8, 2015
99	34	"Paint Jobs"	September 15, 2015
100	35	"Iconic Americana"	September 22, 2015

=== Season 5 (2016) ===
No. overall	No. in season	Title	Original release date
101	1	"Who's Your Caddy?"	February 16, 2016
102	2	"Chrome Is Where the Heart Is"	February 16, 2016
103	3	"One Sweet 'Stang"	February 23, 2016
104	4	"Harley and the Mystery Merc"	February 23, 2016
105	5	"Highways and Driveways"	March 1, 2016
106	6	"Finders Keepers"	March 1, 2016
107	7	"Outrageous Automobiles"	March 8, 2016
108	8	"Carl's Corvette"	March 8, 2016
109	9	"True Classics"	March 15, 2016
110	10	"Swap Meet Mayhem"	March 15, 2016
111	11	"Colorful Customers"	March 22, 2016
112	12	"Run It Like You Brung It"	March 22, 2016
113	13	"Perfect Paint"	March 29, 2016
114	14	"One of a Kind Commissions"	April 5, 2016

=== Season 6 (2016) ===
No. overall	No. in season	Title	Original release date
115	1	"Sweet Lambo of Mine"	July 5, 2016
116	2	"Pick Ups and Ponies"	July 5, 2016
117	3	"El Camino Royale"	July 12, 2016
118	4	"Snider's Ride"	July 12, 2016
119	5	"Boogie Down Buggy"	July 19, 2016
120	6	"Caddylicious"	July 19, 2016
121	7	"Lego My Caddy"	July 26, 2016
122	8	"Blinged Out Blazer"	July 26, 2016
123	9	"Twisted Chopper"	August 2, 2016
124	10	"Back In Time"	August 2, 2016
125	11	"70's Scoot"	August 9, 2016
126	12	"True Fire Fiasco"	August 9, 2016
127	13	"Sailors Soul"	August 16, 2016
128	14	"The Cart Of War"	August 16, 2016
129	15	"Superfine Econoline"	January 28, 2017
130	16	"Chevy Truck Tribute"	January 28, 2017
131	17	"Mangled Mustang (1/2)"	February 4, 2017
132	18	"Mangled Mustang (2/2)"	February 4, 2017
133	19	"Tricked Out Triumph (1/2)"	February 11, 2017
134	20	"Tricked Out Triumph (2/2)"	February 11, 2017
135	21	"Big Money Bike"	February 18, 2017
136	22	"'68 Killer Camaro"	February 18, 2017
137	23	"Crazy Cool Cadillac"	February 25, 2017
138	24	"Better Late than Never"	March 4, 2017

=== Season 7 (2017) ===
No. overall	No. in season	Title	Original release date
139	1	"Danny's New Truck"	April 8, 2017
140	2	"Patriotic Chopper"	April 8, 2017
141	3	"Tommy Lee's Chopper"	April 15, 2017
142	4	"Hot Rod Lincoln"	April 15, 2017
143	5	"The Fast and the Ridiculous (1/2)"	April 22, 2017
144	6	"The Fast and the Ridiculous (2/2)"	April 29, 2017
145	7	"Might Fine '69"	May 6, 2017
146	8	"Dee's Sweet Ride"	May 13, 2017
147	9	"Mustang Madness"	July 13, 2017
148	10	"CHiPs Bike"	October 3, 2017
149	11	"The Amazing Z"	October 3, 2017
150	12	"Oh My Nova"	October 10, 2017
151	13	"Get Your Motor Running"	October 10, 2017
152	14	"Storm Chaser"	October 17, 2017
153	15	"Bel Air Beauty"	October 17, 2017
154	16	"Bonneville Bound (1/2)"	October 24, 2017
155	17	"Bonneville Bound (2/2)"	October 24, 2017
156	18	"Naughty Nomad"	October 31, 2017
157	19	"Old School Camaro"	October 31, 2017

=== Season 8 (2018) ===
No. overall	No. in season	Title	Original release date
158	1	"Dream Charger"	July 10, 2018
Season premiere. Danny decides to sell some of his most beloved cars, but the Count does not have a great track record when it comes to parting with his "babies," so the guys in the shop are understandably skeptical. Meanwhile, a customer asks Danny to find and build the first car he ever had, a 1968 Dodge Charger; and Ryan and Shannon are tasked with re-creating one of the most iconic motorcycles of all time—the "Captain America" chopper from the film "Easy Rider."
159	2	"Bye Bye Baby"	July 17, 2018
A high-rolling car collector sets his sights on Danny's prized Boat-Tail Riviera, so Danny and the collector enter a big bucks negotiation to see if he's worthy of taking this beauty home. Then two sons commission Count's Kustoms to build a 1953 Chevy Pickup to honor their parents and the family business. Meanwhile Ryan brings in a new artist to create a unique motorcycle tribute for a soldier lost in Vietnam.
160	3	"Space Racer"	July 24, 2018
Counts Kustoms gets an out of this world request for a '57 Chevy to be customized with images from the Hubble Telescope; Horny Mike convinces Danny to help him customize a giant truck and trailer, and Danny soon regrets his decision. Also, while Danny and Ryan are hunting for a possible flip, they spot an incredibly rare and valuable Shelby Mustang.
161	4	"4 Star Corvette"	July 31, 2018
A retired four-star general has an important mission for Danny and Counts Kustoms: to build his dream car, a 1967 Chevy Corvette. Later, Danny buys a classic Jaguar, and Horny Mike puts the finishing touches on his massive Horny Truck and Trailer.
162	5	"Dad's T-Bird"	August 7, 2018
Danny finally gets around to tackling one of his most important projects, restoring his father's 1956 Ford Thunderbird. Later, Danny spots a gorgeous El Camino with a high price tag, and Mike and Shannon pull the trigger on an overpriced old jeep.
163	6	"Burning Hot Nova"	August 14, 2018
Danny and the team are commissioned to turn a 1969 Chevy Nova into a dream machine; Ryan and Mike find a '73 Cougar convertible said to belong to Hollywood royalty; and Ryan and Kevin go on the hunt and stumble upon a rare 1952 British motorcycle.
164	7	"Cadillac Crazy"	August 14, 2018
Danny and the team restore a 1966 Cadillac convertible back to its glory days.
165	8	"Milk Truck Masterpiece"	August 21, 2018
Danny and Ryan team up for a special project with legendary custom painter Jon Kosmoski to paint an old DIVCO milk truck. While Ryan and Mike are meeting Jon and his team at House of Kolor in Minneapolis, Danny heads to Shelby American to check out their latest masterpieces, including a beautiful 2017 Super Snake and an historic GT40.
166	9	"Low Riding Lincoln"	August 21, 2018
Danny and Ryan have big plans for a low-riding Lincoln.
167	10	"Champion Chopper"	August 28, 2018
The World Series of Poker guys want a Count's Kustoms chopper as the ultimate online giveaway. Meanwhile, Mike and Ryan check out a completely original 1967 Camaro SS.
168	11	"Big Truck Custom Combo"	August 28, 2018
Danny is commissioned to custom paint a brand new pick-up for a charity auction for the local YMCA and he adds the ultimate accessory to match.
169	12	"Heavy Metal Caddy"	October 9, 2018
Brann Dailor brings in his 1970 Cadillac Coupe DeVille; Shannon and Ryan bring in a one-of-a-kind motorcycle owned by a one-of-a-kind lady.
170	13	"Burt Reynolds' Rides"	October 16, 2018
Vegas Golden Knights goalie Marc-André Fleury comes to Count's Kustoms looking for an All-American muscle car; Danny agrees to prep several of Burt Reynold's personal rides for auction, but he didn't know that he would be fulfilling one of the film legend's final wishes.
171	14	"Counts of Hazzard"	October 23, 2018
Guitarist DJ Ashba stops by the shop to have Danny work on his 100 year old Model-T rat rod. Then, the Count's Kustoms crew are commissioned to build a car that would make Bo and Luke proud, a 21st century version of the iconic General Lee Dodge Charger from "The Dukes of Hazzard" TV show. And when the proud owners of a 1996 Ford Bronco want to pay tribute to their military family with a portrait on the hood, they enlist Danny to get the job done.
172	15	"Red, Hot, and Dangerous"	October 30, 2018
Danny has big plans for a little street rocket known as a Manta; the crew commissions an 80s era Corvette that the owner wants to bring into the new millennium; and Shannon meets a lady motorcycle racer who wants her Harley XR1200 customized.
173	16	"Danny Doubles Down"	November 6, 2018
The massive auto extravaganza known as SEMA rolls into Las Vegas, and this time Danny will be ready. He's getting not one, but two incredible Counts Kustoms creations ready for the big show. Meanwhile, Ryan and Mike travel to Borla Exhaust headquarters in Los Angeles to work on the Manta McLaren tribute car and check out a rare vintage Ferrari; and Danny throws budget and restraint out the window turning his old 1955 Chevy into a world class '70s era Gasser.
174	17	"Danny's Detroit Special"	July 9, 2019
Danny restores a 1969 Shelby GT500. Later, the group checks out the Ridler Award in Detroit. Danny sells two cars from his personal collection.

=== Season 9 (2020) ===
No. overall	No. in season	Title	Original release date
175	1	"Killer Kellison"	June 3, 2020
Danny brings home a rare Kellison J6 for the team to prepare for SEMA. Shannon works on a V8 powered Boss Hoss motorcycle.
176	2	"Count Down to SEMA"	June 10, 2020
The team works overtime to finish the '61 Cadillac Coupe de Ville in time for SEMA. Danny is given the opportunity to purchase a 2000 Plymouth Prowler. The '61 Cadillac and Kellison J6 make their debuts at the SEMA show.
177	3	"Big Love Buick"	June 17, 2020
Danny and the team work on a 1941 Buick for charity. A 1954 Harley Panhead is worked on by Shannon and Ryan.
178	4	"Little Red Corvette"	June 24, 2020
Danny finds a 1966 Corvette Sting Ray, later, Danny and the crew attend a car auction in Palm Springs, CA, where the 1961 Cadillac SEMA build is sold.
179	5	"Mike Gets Medieval"	July 1, 2020
Horny Mike paints a Medieval mural on a 1973 GMC pickup truck, Danny finds a rare Sunbeam Tiger. Ryan and Shannon work on a Harley-Davidson trike.
180	6	"The Magic Bus"	July 8, 2020
Ryan and Shannon visit a VW Bus ranch in Texas, where they purchase a 1960 model to restore for a client. A 1963 split-window Corvette is also featured.
181	7	"Heroes and Horsepower"	September 30, 2020
182	8	"All Charged Up"	October 7, 2020
183	9	"GTO Dream"	October 14, 2020
184	10	"Alice Cooper's Dream"	October 21, 2020
