= Count's 77 =

American hard rock band

Count's 77 is a hard rock band from Las Vegas, Nevada. It was formed by Danny "The Count" Koker, titular star of Counting Cars, the History Channel spinoff of Pawn Stars. The band focuses on the rock genre of the 1970s and has been playing and performing since well before Koker's rise in the public eye. "The Count," who heads the band with lead vocals, is joined by John Zito (guitar), Stoney Curtis (guitar), Barry Barnes (bass) and Paul Disibio (drums) and the recently added Tommy Paris (keyboard). They are currently signed to Shrapnel Records. The number "77" in the band's name is a reference to the 1970s, the decade whose music is an inspiration to the band.

== History ==
=== Founding ===
Contrary to the belief of many fans, Count's 77 was formed before Danny Koker's role in Counting Cars was established. The Count's father (also named Danny Koker), who was the baritone vocalist and keyboardist for the Cathedral Quartet, a well-known southern gospel group, influenced his son from a young age to appreciate music. The band came together at a jam night at Koker's Las Vegas rock club, Count's Vamp'd. These weekly sessions were, and still are, headed by Count's 77 guitarist Jony Zito. Koker, as owner of the club, would occasionally come on stage and sing. One night, Koker, Zito, Curtis, Barnes, and Disibio – all current members except Tommy Paris – shared the stage and felt instant chemistry. Koker remembers, "it just felt real. It felt great." After deciding to all rehearse together again, the new group continued to perform at Vamp'd, eventually drawing a crowd of spectators and listeners. "Lucky for us, Koker said, "we turned out to be all like-minded people... lovin the same type of music."

=== Counting Cars (2012) ===
Counting Cars debuted in August 2012 and has completed its eighth season. The reality TV show chronicles the daily happenings at Count's Kustoms, a Las Vegas automobile restoration and customization company owned and operated by Koker. While the Count's new television prominence did not lead to the band's forming, it gives Count's 77 a wide-reaching platform and allows the band to reach millions of viewers across the world when they are featured on the show. Koker, who has made several appearances on Pawn Stars as well as having his own show, thus has a large following of viewers and fans. Cast members of the TV show, most notably Kustoms airbrush artist Horny Mike, have made appearances at Count's 77 performances, with Koker's show and band symbiotically co-promoting one another. In addition, fans are pleased to find that Koker is "exactly the same in person as he is on television." Koker films episodes of the show during weekdays, then often flies to concert venues around the country on weekends to perform. They released the follow-up Soul Transfusion in 2017. Also on Shrapnel Records.

=== Shrapnel (2014) ===
Stoney Curtis, one of the band's two guitar leads, had been signed to Shrapnel Records since 2004. This relationship proved beneficial when Mike Varney, founder and owner of Shrapnel, attended a Count's 77 show and liked what he saw. The band signed a record deal with Shrapnel soon after. Varney brought keyboardist Tommy Paris to a meeting with Count's 77 to introduce him to the band. The existing members liked his work and felt a good deal of musical chemistry with Paris, who then became a permanent member of the group. In August 2014, Count's 77 and Shrapnel Records released the band's debut album, a 13-track release self-titled "Count's 77." The band also gave several performances around the county, including New York City's Hard Rock Cafe, to promote the album. They performed at the Les Paul 100th anniversary in a Times Square in 2015 released their follow-up sophomore release Soul Transfusion in 2017 also on Shrapnel

== Members ==
- Danny "The Count" Koker, lead vocals, is best known for his role on Counting Cars, which is on its seventh season on History. In addition to fronting the band, Koker owns and heads Count's Kustoms, the auto shop featured on the show. He also owns a rock and roll bar and grill in Las Vegas, Count's Vamp'd, as well as Count's Tattoo Company, a tattoo parlor at the Rio All Suite Hotel and Casino. His father, the late Danny Koker, was a member of the southern gospel group the Cathedral Quartet, and taught his son a love of music. The Count credits his father as the reason he wanted to start a band, saying, "He was all about music and he brought me up in it, so for me, [the band] was something that could feed my soul. It was something that could help me cope with losing him. To this day, every time we play, I have at least one moment on that stage where I feel close to him somehow."
- Stoney Curtis is the band's lead guitarist. A longtime Shrapnel recording and touring blues artist, he has amassed an international following. He heads the psychedelic-blues-rock trio the Stoney Curtis Band and has released six albums, the first of which was self-released and the remaining five with Shrapnel. Stoney is the Co-writer of the songs for Count's 77.
- John Zito provides the band with not only its unique sound with his slide and dobro guitars, but also its name: Count's 77 used to be Zito 77. Self-taught at the age of 11, he has played and recorded with members of Guns N' Roses, Pat Travers and The Ramones. He also heads the three-man John Zito Band. His band, John Zeto and Electric Church, was the group that headed the jam nights at Vamp'd, where Count's 77 was first brought together and born.
- Barry Barnes: Growing up in Michigan, bassist Barry Barnes played alongside many bands in the 1980s including 24K and Brat. He played in the band of the critically acclaimed Rock of Ages at The Venetian, Las Vegas before joining Count's 77 on stage at Count's Vamp'd.
- Paul Disibio is Count's 77's drummer. In addition to playing and recording with Count's 77, he teaches drums and has played in the popular Blue Man Group performances, as well as alongside Grammy Award-winning Al Rapone.
- Tommy Paris, also known as Don Jillson, plays the keyboard for Count's 77. He has been known internationally for more than 25 years as the lead singer of platinum rockers Britny Fox.
