= Chevrolet Camaro (first generation) =

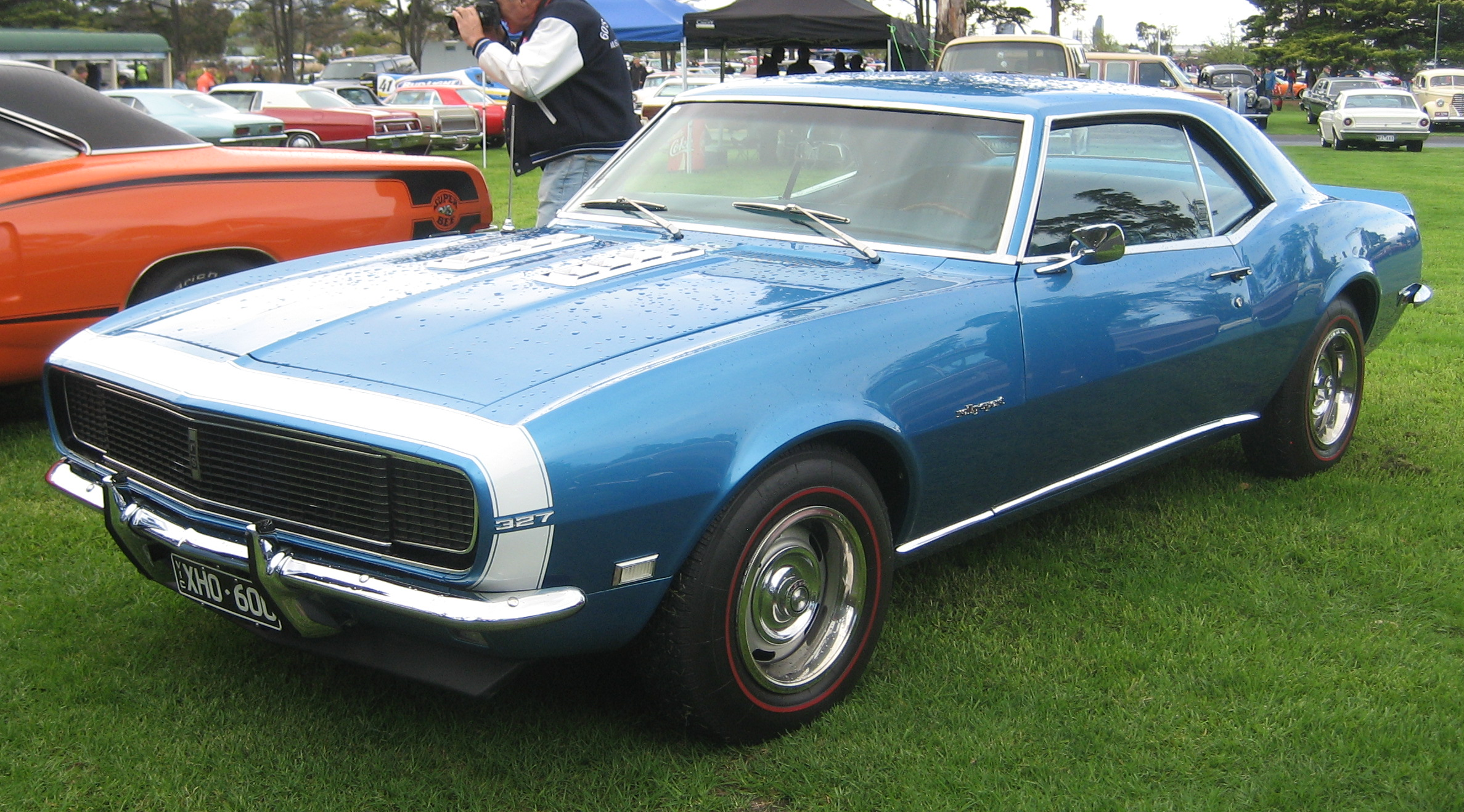
- 1968 Camaro RS 327

Overview
- Manufacturer: Chevrolet (General Motors)
- Production: September 29, 1966 – November 1969
- Model years: 1967–1969
- Assembly: United States: Van Nuys, California; United States: Norwood, Ohio; Venezuela: Caracas; Peru: Lima; Belgium: Antwerp; Switzerland: Biel; Philippines: Manila (Yutivo)
- Designer: Henry Haga

Body and chassis
- Class: Pony car; Muscle car
- Body style: 2-door hardtop; 2-door convertible
- Layout: FR layout
- Platform: F-body
- Related: Pontiac Firebird (first generation)

Powertrain
- Engine: 230 cu in (3.8 L) L26 I6; 250 cu in (4.1 L) L22 I6; 283 cu in (4.6 L) small-block V8; 302 cu in (4.9 L) Z28 V8 (Z/28); 307 cu in (5.0 L) L14 V8; 327 cu in (5.4 L) LF7/L30 V8; 350 cu in (5.7 L) LM1/L65 V8; 350 cu in (5.7 L) L48 V8 (SS350); 396 cu in (6.5 L) L35/L34/L78 V8 (SS396); 427 cu in (7.0 L) L72/ZL1 V8 (COPO)
- Transmission: 3-speed manual; 4-speed manual; 2-speed semi-automatic; 2-speed automatic; 3-speed automatic

Dimensions
- Wheelbase: 108 in (2,743 mm)
- Length: 184.7 in (4,691 mm) (MY1967); 184.7 in (4,691 mm) (MY1968); 186.0 in (4,724 mm) (MY1969)
- Width: 72.5 in (1,842 mm) (MY1967); 72.5 in (1,842 mm) (MY1968); 74.0 in (1,880 mm) (MY1969)
- Height: 51.4 in (1,306 mm) (MY1967); 51.4 in (1,306 mm) (MY1968); 50.9 in (1,293 mm) (MY1969 conv.); 51.1 in (1,298 mm) (MY1969)

Chronology
- Successor: Chevrolet Camaro (second generation)

The first-generation Chevrolet Camaro is an American pony car introduced by Chevrolet in the fall of 1966 for the 1967 model year. It used a brand-new rear-wheel-drive GM F-body platform and was available as a 2-door, 2+2 seat, hardtop, and convertible. The F-body was shared with the Pontiac Firebird for all generations. A 230 cu in Chevrolet straight-6 was standard, with several Chevy V8s available as options. The first-generation Camaro was built through the 1969 model year.

Almost all of 1967–1969 Camaros were built in the two U.S. assembly plants: Norwood, Ohio, and Van Nuys, California. There were also five non-U.S. Camaro assembly plants in countries that required local assembly and content. These plants were located in the Philippines, Belgium, Switzerland, Venezuela, and Peru.

== Options ==
The debut Camaro's standard drivetrain was a Chevrolet Turbo-Thrift 230 cu in (3.8 L) straight-6 engine rated at 140 hp (104 kW) at 4400 rpm and 220 lb⋅ft (298 N⋅m) of torque at 1600 rpm, coupled to a 3-speed manual transmission.

To keep up with other manufacturers in the ever more crowded pony car niche, a selection of optional base-model and high-performance V8s was offered, as well as a variety of optional manual and automatic transmissions.

Eight different engines were available in the 1967 Camaro, 10 in 1968, and 12 in 1969. Optional transmissions during the first-generation model run included the two-speed "Powerglide" automatic transmission, and a four-speed manual, available with any engine. A three-speed "Turbo Hydra-Matic 350" automatic became available on most V8s starting in 1968. The optional automatic for SS 396 cars was the three-speed Turbo 400. In 1969, a semi-automatic "Torque-Drive" two-speed transmission was available on six-cylinder models.

=== Packages ===
The Camaro was offered in three main optional packages:

- The RS appearance package. Available on any model, it included hidden headlights (with horizontally retractable doors that hid behind the grille when opened), revised taillights with back-up lights under the rear bumper, RS badging, and bright exterior trim.
- The SS performance package, consisting of a 350 cu in (5.7 L) or 396 cu in (6.5 L) V8s and chassis upgrades to handle the additional power and deliver better handling. The SS featured non-functional air inlets on the hood, special striping, and SS badging.
- The Z/28 performance package, designed to allow the Camaro to compete in the SCCA Trans-Am Series. It included a solid-lifter 302 cu in (4.9 L) V8, 4-speed transmission, power front disc brakes, 12-bolt rear axle, 15" wheels, heavy duty suspension and a pair of wide "skunk" stripes down the hood and trunk lid. The Z/28 offered vibrant street-legal performance, but required numerous additional modifications to be raced competitively.

== 1967 ==
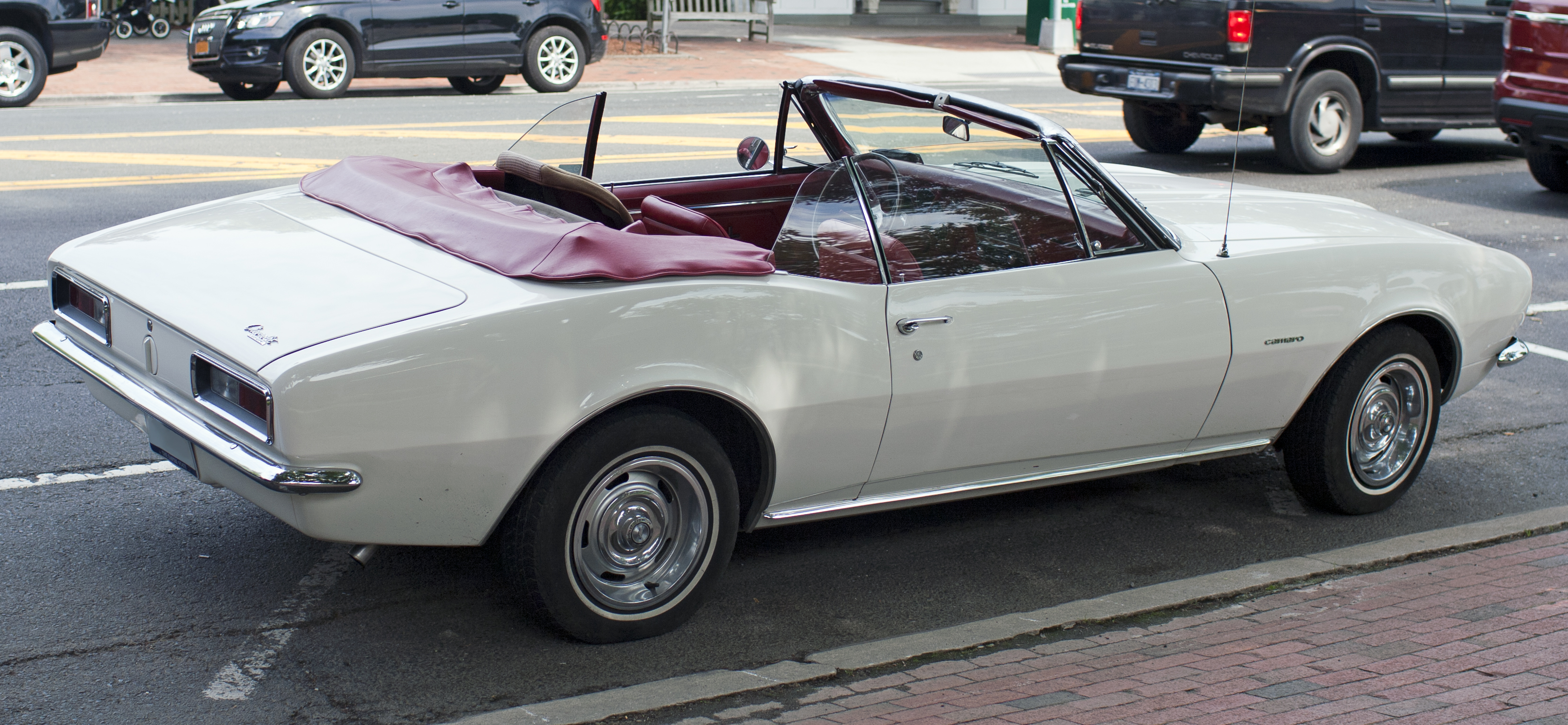
1967 Camaro convertible, base six-cylinder model

The 1967 styling was done by the same team that had designed the 1965 second-generation Corvair. The Camaro shared the subframe / semi-unibody design with the 1968 Chevy II Nova. Almost 80 factory-and 40 dealer-installed options were offered, including the RS, SS, and Z/28 main trim packages.

=== SS ===
The SS included a 350 cu in (5.7 L) producing 295 bhp (299 PS; 220 kW) at 4800 rpm and 380 lb⋅ft (515 N⋅m) at 3200 rpm of torque; and the L35 and L78 396 cu in (6.5 L) big-block V8 engines producing 325 bhp (330 PS; 242 kW) or 375 bhp (380 PS; 280 kW) at 5600 rpm and 415 lb⋅ft (563 N⋅m) at 3600 rpm of torque were available. The SS featured non-functional air inlets on the hood, special striping, and SS badging on the grille, front fenders, gas cap, and horn button. In 1967, a Camaro RS/SS convertible with a 396 engine paced the Indianapolis 500; 100 replicas were sold to the public.

=== Z/28 ===
The Z/28 option code was introduced in December 1966 for the 1967 model year. It was the brainchild of Vince Piggins, who conceived offering "virtually race-ready" Camaros for sale from any Chevrolet dealer. This option package was not mentioned in any sales literature, so it was unknown to most buyers.

The Z/28 featured a high-output small-block 302 cu in (4.9 L) V8 that had been designed for competing in the 5 litre (305 cu in) class of the then-popular Trans-Am racing series. It had a strongly over-square, high-revving 4 in (101.6 mm) bore and 3 in (76.2 mm) stroke, with an aluminum intake manifold, and a 4-barrel vacuum secondary high-volume 780 cfm Holley carburetor. It took Ford until 1969 to mount a head-to-head competitor: the Boss 302 Mustang.

Advertised power of the 302 V8 was 290 hp (216 kW) at 5300 rpm — intentionally under-rated (a common practice at the time) so Chevrolet could keep claimed horsepower under 1 per cubic inch for insurance premium calculations and racing classification.

The Z/28 also came with upgraded suspension, power front disc brakes, a 4-speed Muncie close-ratio manual transmission and a 12-bolt rear axle. Positraction was optional. Wide racing stripes on the hood and trunk lid could be deleted at no charge, '302' front fender emblems came on the 1967 and early 1968 cars, 'Z/28' emblems in the late 1968s and 1969s.

The 1967 Z/28 received air from an open-element air cleaner or from an optional cowl plenum duct attached to the side of the air cleaner that ran to the firewall and got air from the cowl vents. An optional cowl induction hood became available in 1969. 15-inch rally wheels were included with Z/28s, while all other 1967-9 Camaros had 14-inch wheels.

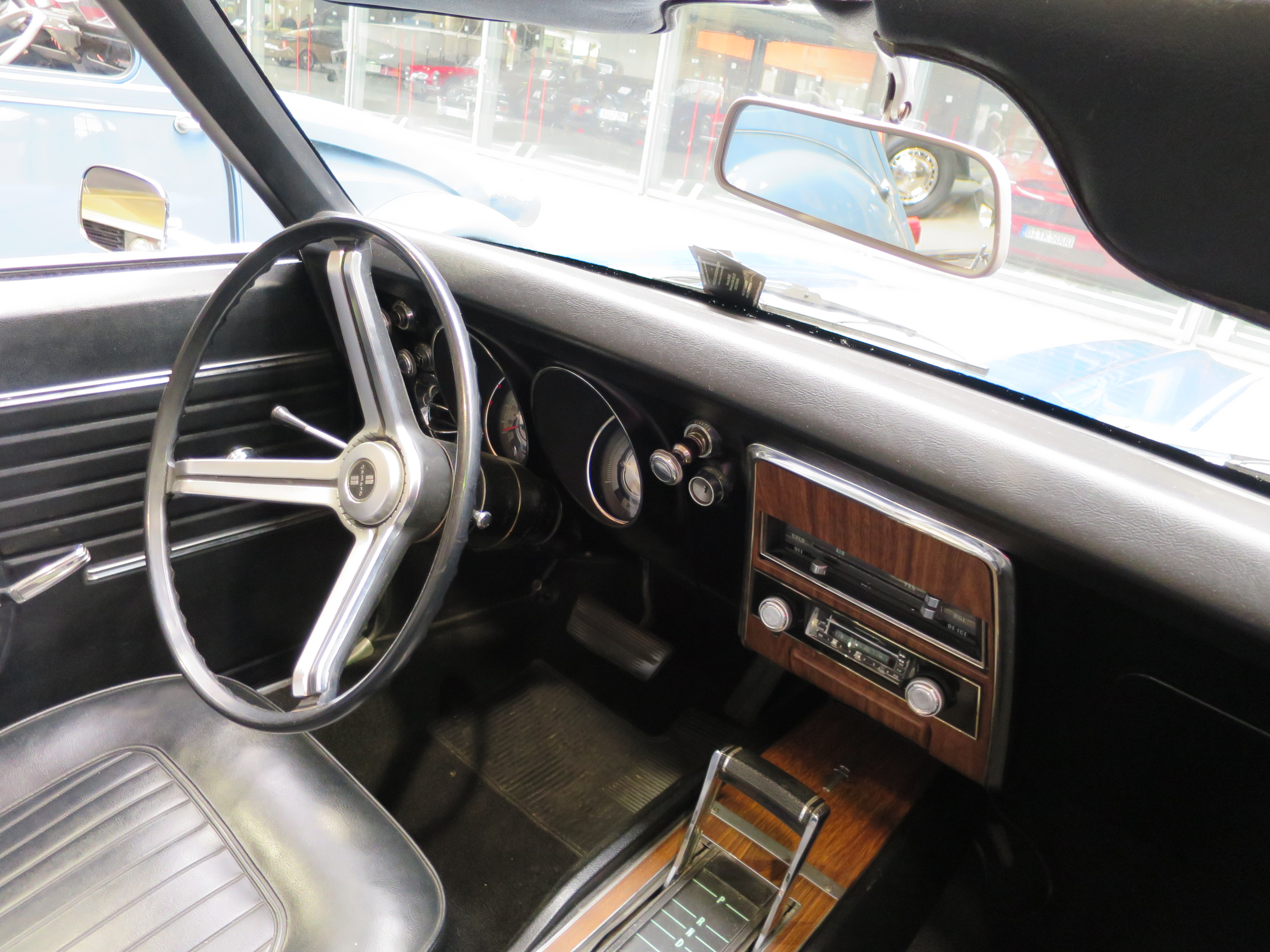
1968 Camaro interior

The origin of the Z/28 nameplate came from the RPO codes – RPO Z28 was the code for the Special Performance Package. RPO Z27 was for the Super Sport package. A total of 602 Z/28s equipped Camaros were sold in 1967.

The Z/28 option would return in 1968, continue into the second generation in 1970, drop the / from its name in 1972, and remain available as the Z28 through 1987. It would return for 1991 and continue to the end of the fourth generation in 2002. It would then reappear in 2014 in the fifth generation rebadged back to the Z/28 (though 2015). There was no sixth generation Z/28.

=== Swiss-assembled cars ===
Cars assembled in Switzerland, at GM's local facility in Biel, were all coupes with a Chevrolet 283 cu in (4.6 L) V8 that produced 198 PS (146 kW; 195 hp) at 4800 rpm and 285 lb⋅ft (386 N⋅m) at 2400 rpm. This engine was not available in contemporary Camaros built in the United States. The Swiss-built Camaros had a limited-slip differential and front disc brakes as standard. Some additional safety equipment was also standard.

=== Production numbers ===
Base:	121,051
RS:	64,842
SS:	34,411
Z/28:	602
Total:	220,906

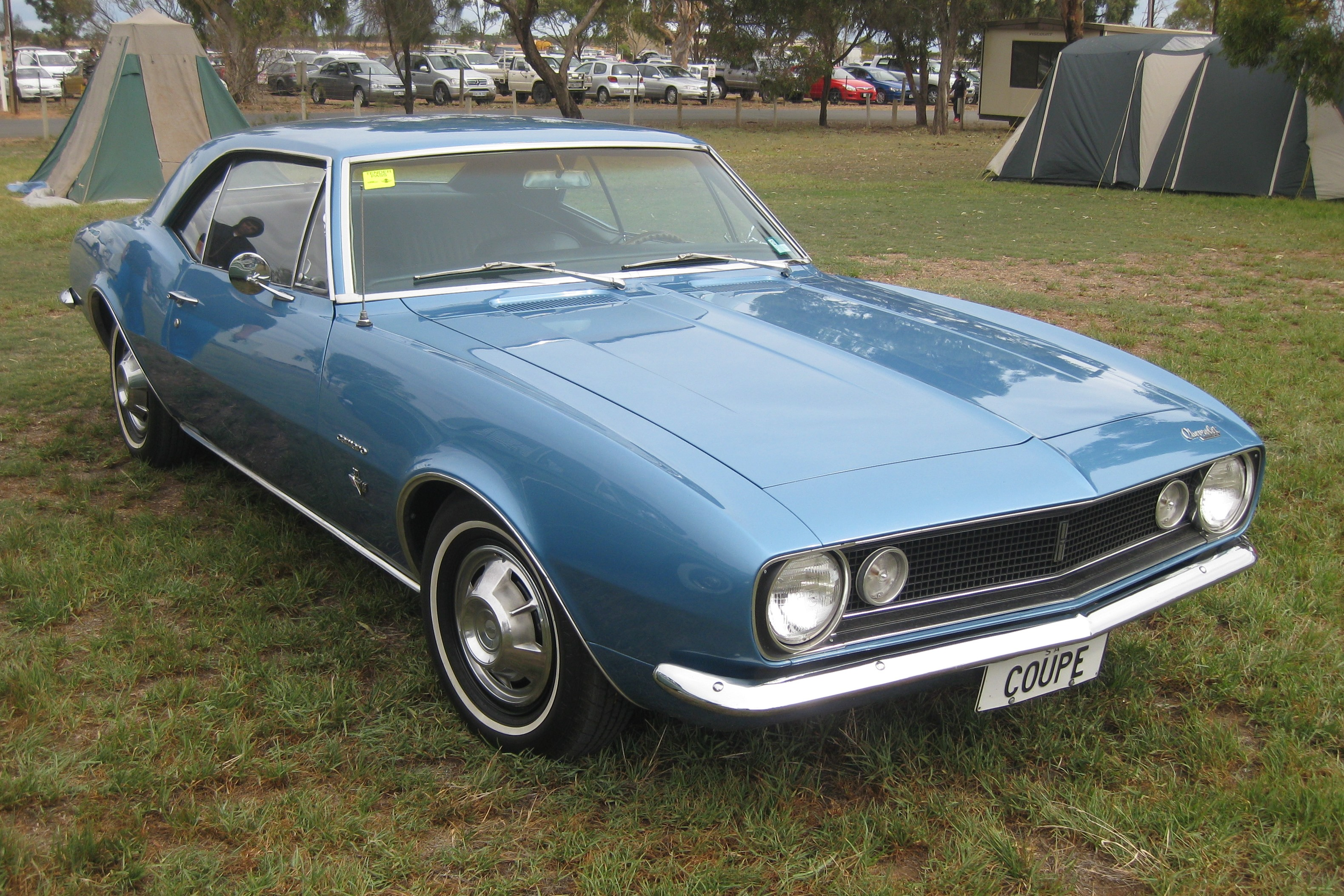
1967 Chevrolet Camaro Sport Coupe

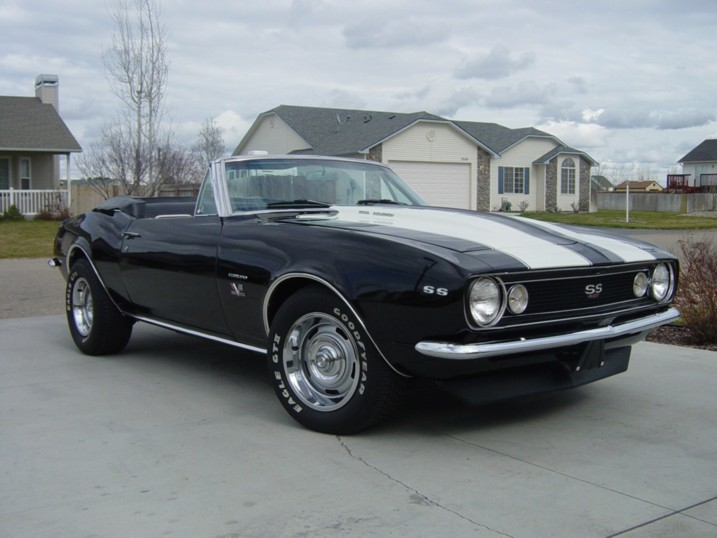
1967 Chevrolet Camaro SS convertible (with user-added Z/28 stripes, non-standard white-letter tires)

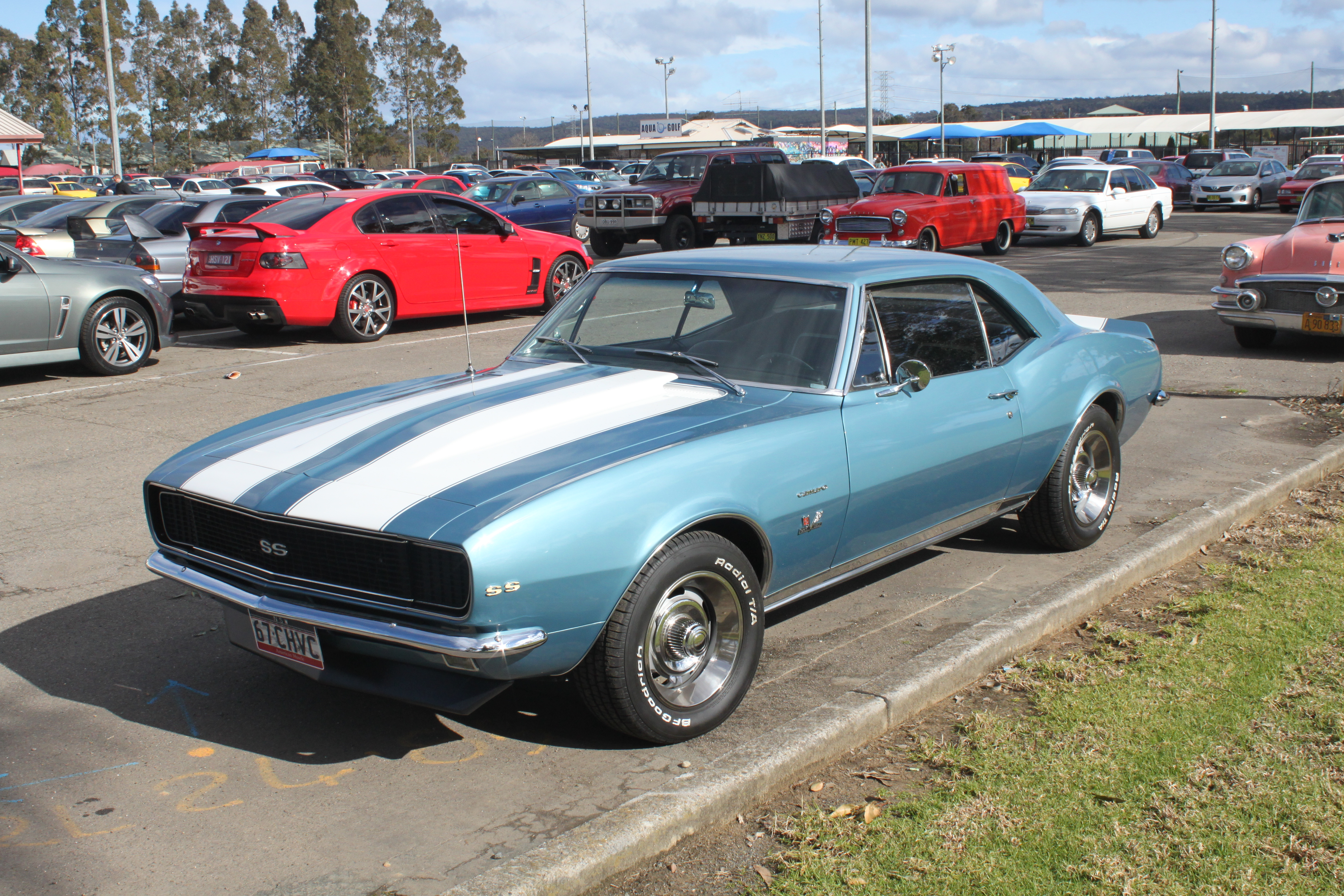
1967 Chevrolet Camaro RS/SS 396 coupé (with user-added Z/28 stripes, non-standard white-letter tires)

== 1968 ==
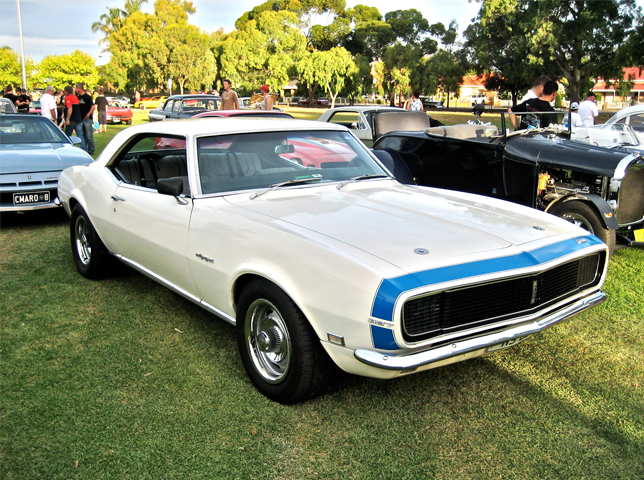
1968 Camaro RS 327 (original optional stripe was black)

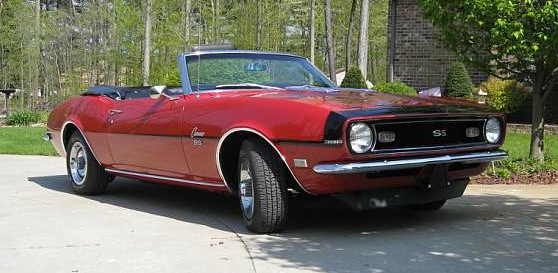
1968 Chevrolet Camaro SS convertible

The styling of the 1968 Camaro was very similar to the 1967 design. With the introduction of Astro Ventilation, a fresh-air-inlet system, the side vent windows were deleted. Side marker lights were added on the front and rear fenders as part of safety requirements for all 1968 vehicles. Side mirrors changed from round to square. It also had a more pointed front grille and divided rear taillights. The front running lights (on non-RS models) were also changed from circular to oval. The SS models received chrome hood inserts that imitated velocity stacks and big block models had a low-gloss black rear tail light panel.

The rear shock absorber mounting was staggered to resolve wheel hop issues, and higher-performance SS models received multi-leaf rear springs instead of single-leaf units. A 396 cu in (6.5 L) producing 350 hp (261 kW) at 5200 rpm and 415 lb⋅ft (563 N⋅m) of torque at 3400 rpm big block engine was added as an option for the SS, and the Z/28 appeared in Camaro brochures, and nearly 7,200 were sold. The 427 cu in (7.0 L) was not available as a Regular Production Option (RPO).

Chevrolet's Special Production Division had to convince Chevrolet's General Manager Pete Estes, but the General Manager only drove convertible vehicles, and the Z/28 was never produced as a convertible. A Central Office Production Order (COPO) was placed for the only Z/28 convertible Camaro built. The car was parked in the executive garage which Pete Estes had access to. Upon driving the vehicle, he promptly approved promoting the Z/28. A 1968 Z/28 competed in the 1971 British Saloon Car Championship at Crystal Palace in a three-way battle for the lead, a race which was later featured in the "Sporting Moments" episode of BBC's 100 Greatest series.

=== Production numbers ===
Base:	159,087
RS:	40,977
SS:	27,884
Z/28:	7,199
Total:	235,147

== 1969 ==
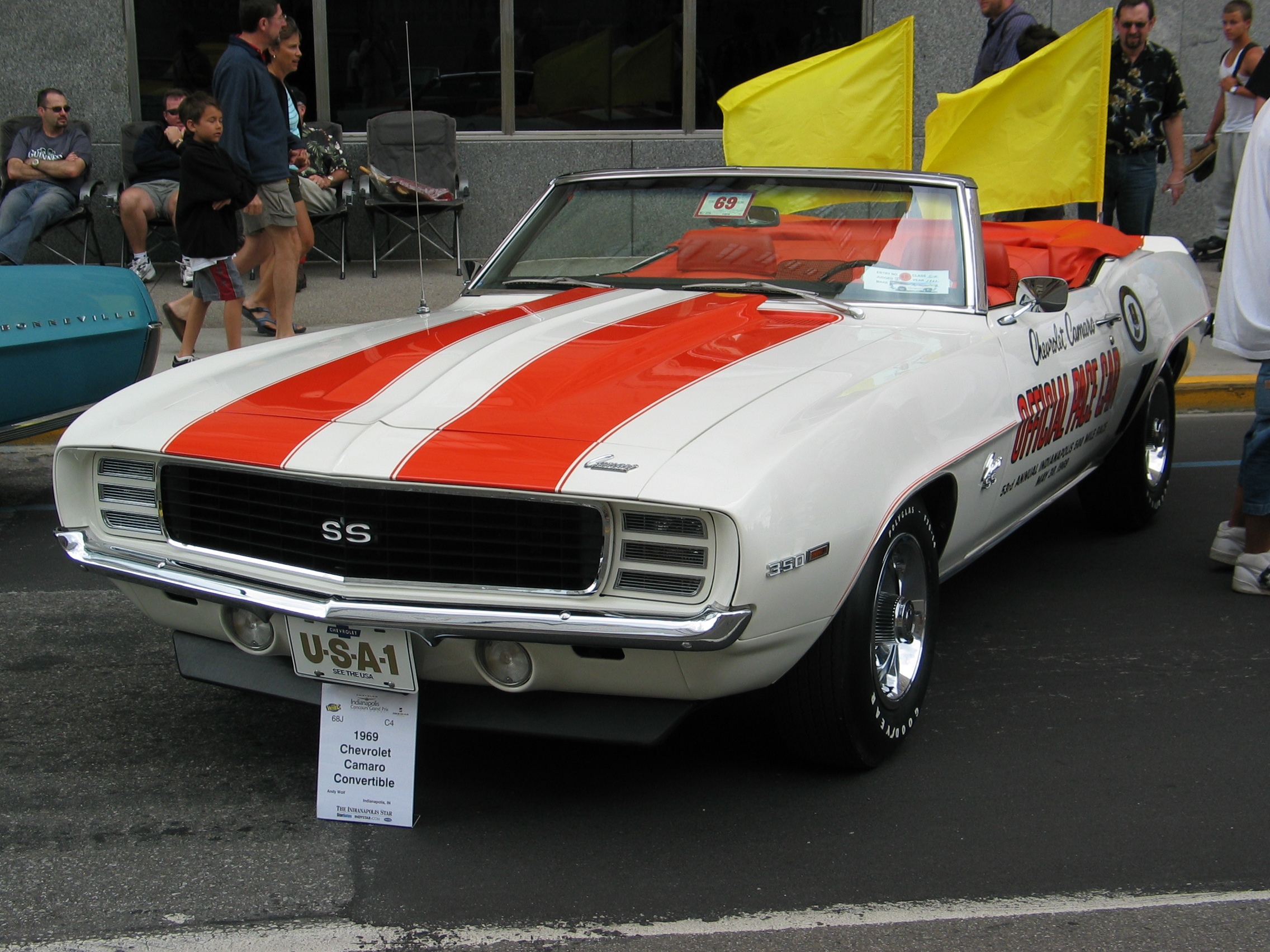
1969 Chevrolet Camaro Indianapolis 500 Pace Car Replica included the RS & SS options

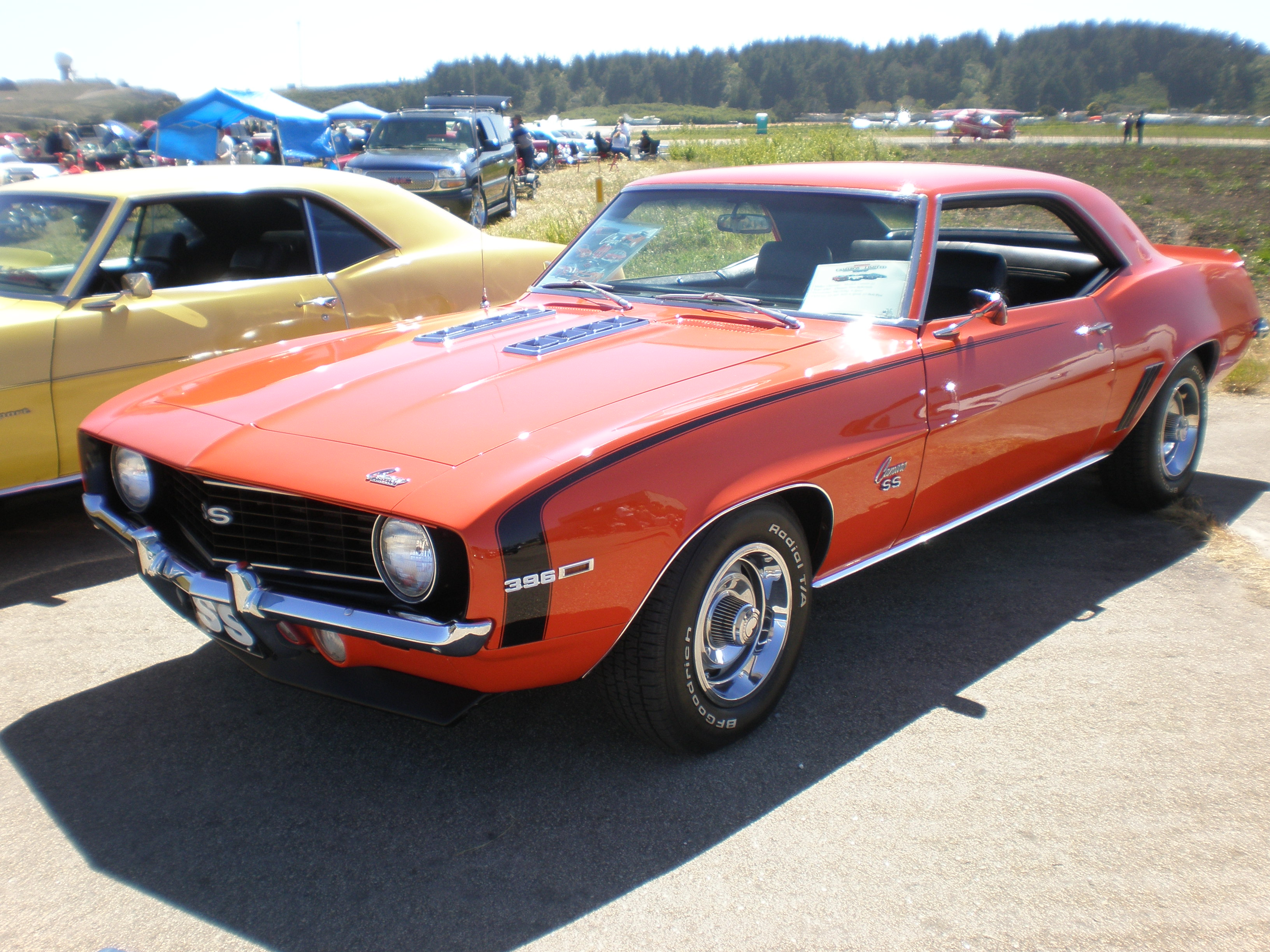
1969 Chevrolet Camaro SS

The 1969 Camaro carried over the previous year's drivetrain and major mechanical components, but all-new sheet metal, except the hood, trunk lid, and roof, gave the car a new look. The grille was redesigned with sharper V and deeply inset headlights. New door skins, rear quarter panels, and rear valance panel made the car look lower and wider. This styling would only serve for the 1969 model year.

To increase competitiveness in the SCCA Trans-Am racing series, optional four-wheel disc brakes with four-piston calipers were made available during the year, under RPO JL8, for US$500.30. This system used components from the Corvette and made for a significant improvement in the braking capability and was a key to winning the Trans-Am championship. The option was expensive and only 206 units were produced.

The Rally Sport (RS) option, RPO Z22, included a unique black-painted grille with concealed headlights and headlight washers, fender striping (except when sport striping or Z/28 Special Performance Package is specified), simulated rear fender louvers, front and rear wheel opening moldings, black body sill, RS emblems on grille, steering wheel and rear panel, Rally Sport front fender nameplates, bright accented taillights, back-up lights below rear bumper; hardtops got bright roof drip moldings. The RS option cost $131.65, with 37,773 orders filled.

Z/28 sales soared from 7,200 to over 20,000, available with the same 302 cu in (4.9 L) small block producing 290 hp (294 PS; 216 kW) at 5800 rpm and 290 lb⋅ft (393 N⋅m) of torque at 4200 rpm. It was backed by Muncie manual four-speed transmission with a new-for-69 standard Hurst shifter and connected to a 12-bolt rear axle with standard 3.73 gears. The 302 featured 11:1 compression, forged pistons, forged steel crankshaft and connecting rods, solid lifters, and Holley carburetor on a dual-plane intake manifold. A dual four-barrel crossram intake manifold was available as a dealer-installed option.

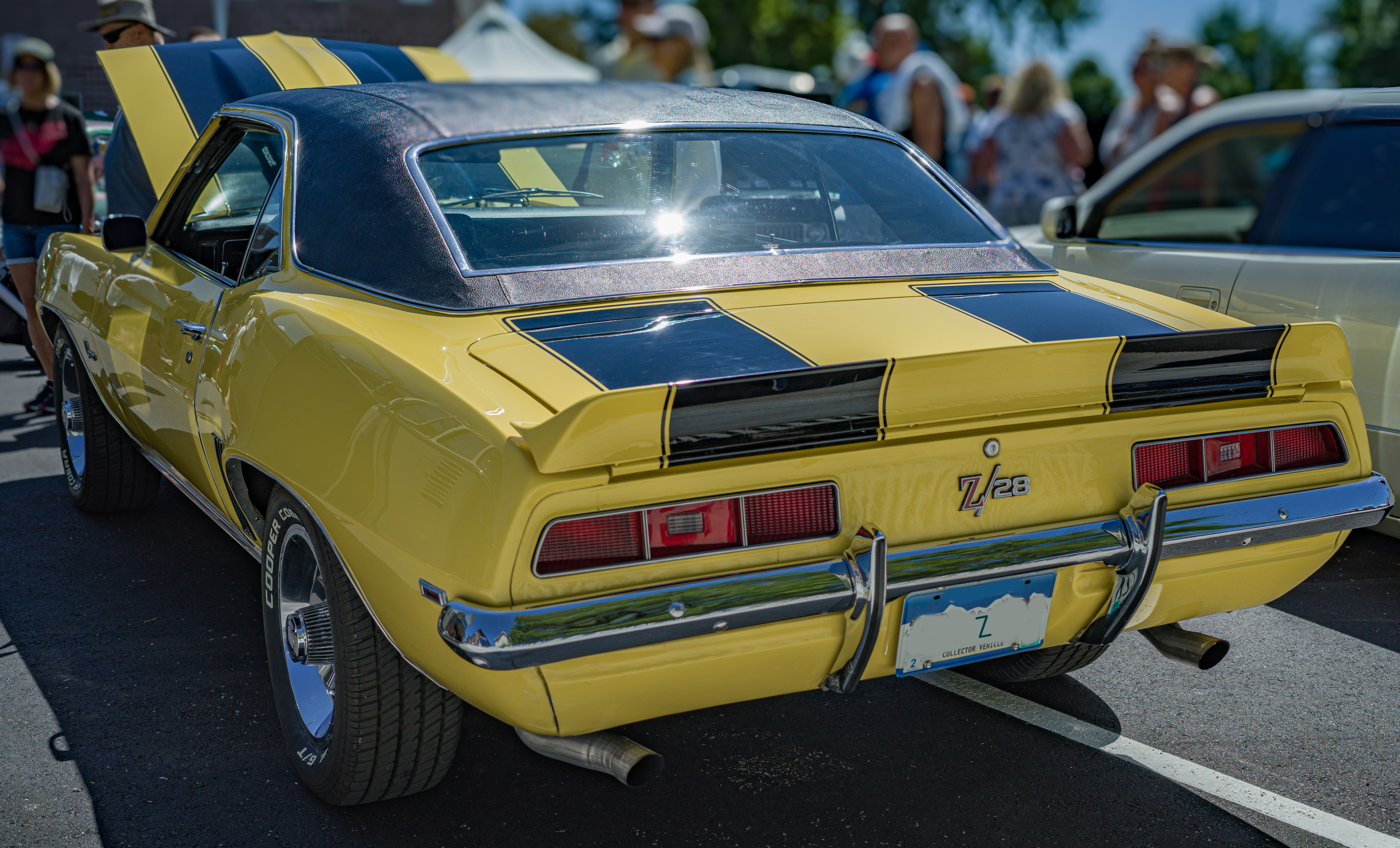
1969 Chevrolet Camaro Z28 in Daytona Yellow

The 1969 model year was extended into November 1969, due to manufacturing problems that delayed the introduction of the second generation model planned for 1970.

=== Production numbers ===
Base:	150,078
RS:	37,773
SS:	34,932
Z/28:	20,302
Total:	243,085

=== COPO 427s ===
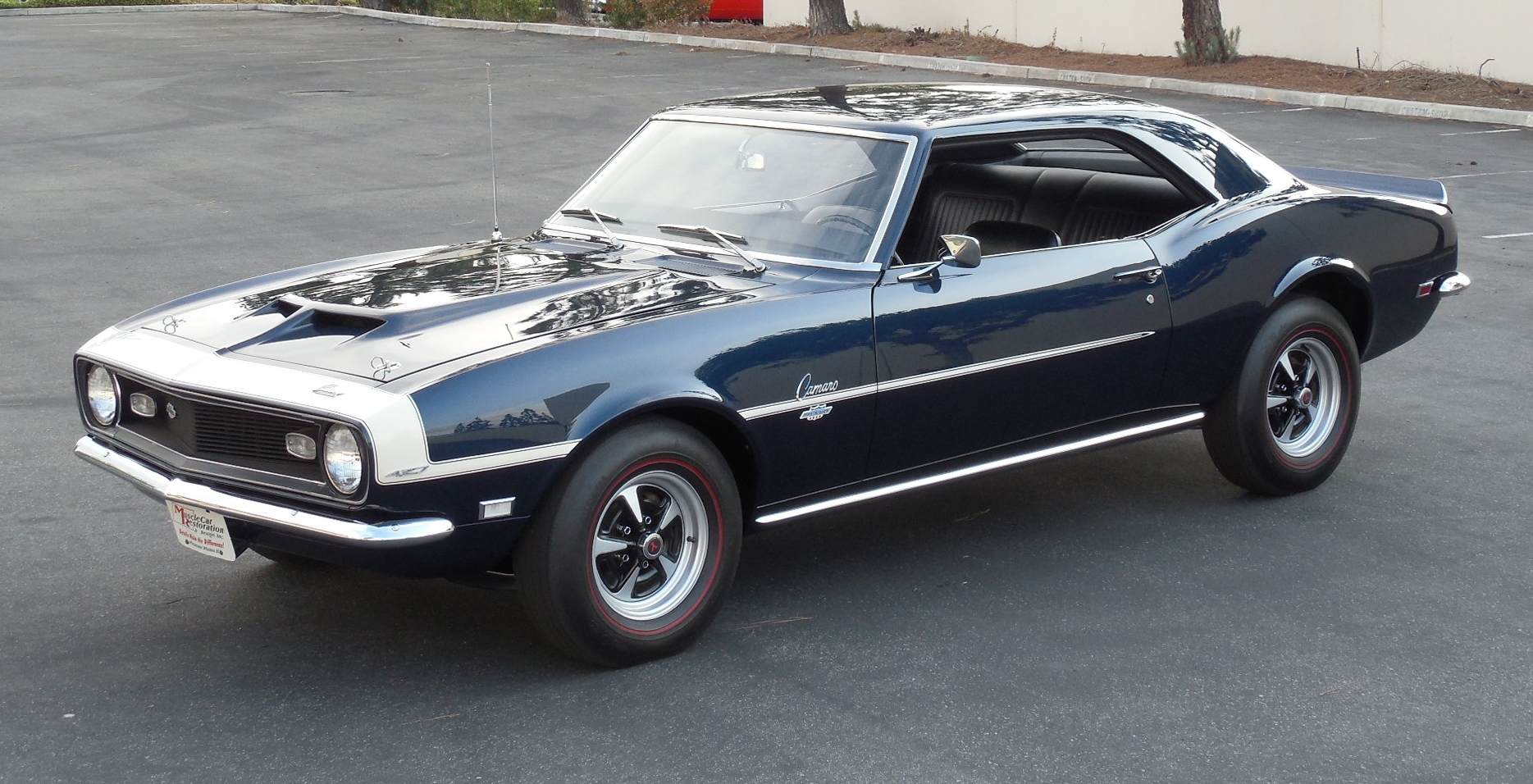
1968 Yenko Camaro

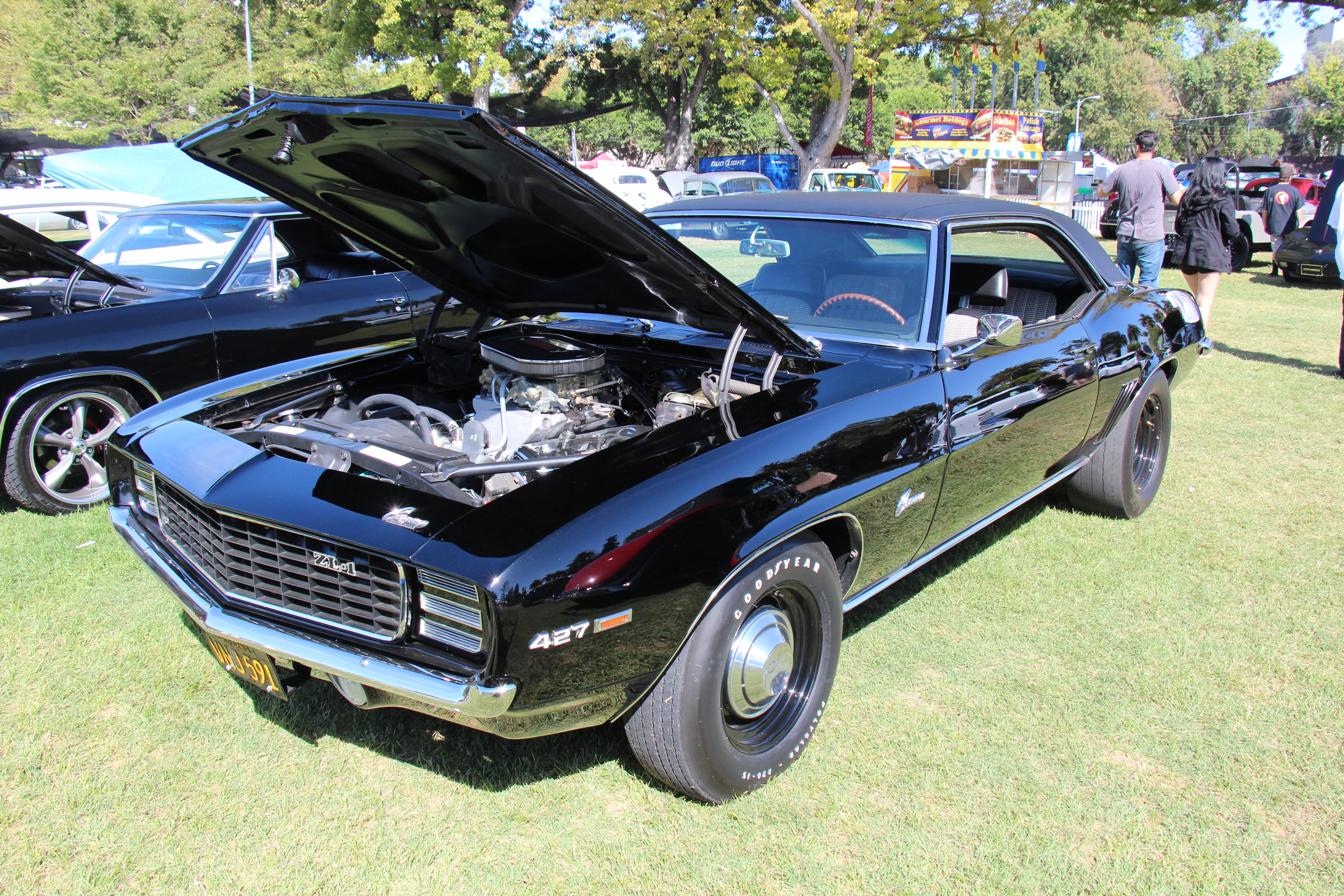
1969 Camaro COPO 9560 ZL1

A GM corporate edict forbade its Divisions from installing engines larger than 400 cu in (6.6 L) in mid-size and smaller models. Requests from dealers (notably Don Yenko in PA, Baldwin-Motion in NY, Nickey in IL and Dana in CA) who had been dealer-installing 427 cu in (7.0 L) engines in the Camaro prompted Chevrolet to use an ordering process usually used on fleet and special orders (taxis, trucks, etc.) to offer 427 engines in the Camaro. Two Central Office Production Orders (COPO), numbers 9560 and 9561, were offered in the 1969 model year.

The COPO 9561 used the cast iron block/cast iron heads, solid-lifter L72 big-block engine, rated at 425 hp (317 kW) SAE gross at 5600 rpm and 460 lb⋅ft (624 N⋅m) of torque at 4000 rpm. Yenko ordered 201 of these cars to convert them into Yenko Camaros. Other dealers also became aware of the L72 engine package. Around 1,000 Camaros were fitted with the L72 engine option.

The COPO 9560 used an all-aluminum ZL1 designed specifically for drag racing, where weight savings were at an absolute premium. The package was conceived by drag racer Dick Harrell, and ordered through Fred Gibb Chevrolet in La Harpe, IL, to enter NHRA Super Stock racing. A total of 69 ZL1 Camaros were produced. The engine alone cost over US$4,000—or more than an entire base V8 Camaro. Rated at 430 hp (321 kW) SAE gross at 5200rpm and 450 lb⋅ft (610 N⋅m) of torque at 4400rpm/376 hp (280 kW) SAE net "as installed", it could produce over 500 gross with exhaust changes and tuning.

The ZL1 engines were manufactured at the Tonawanda Assembly Plant before being installed in Corvettes and Camaros or sold over the counter to racers. Each took 16 hours to be hand-assembled in a room that Corvette Chief Engineer Zora Arkus-Duntov described as "surgically clean."

== First-generation engines ==
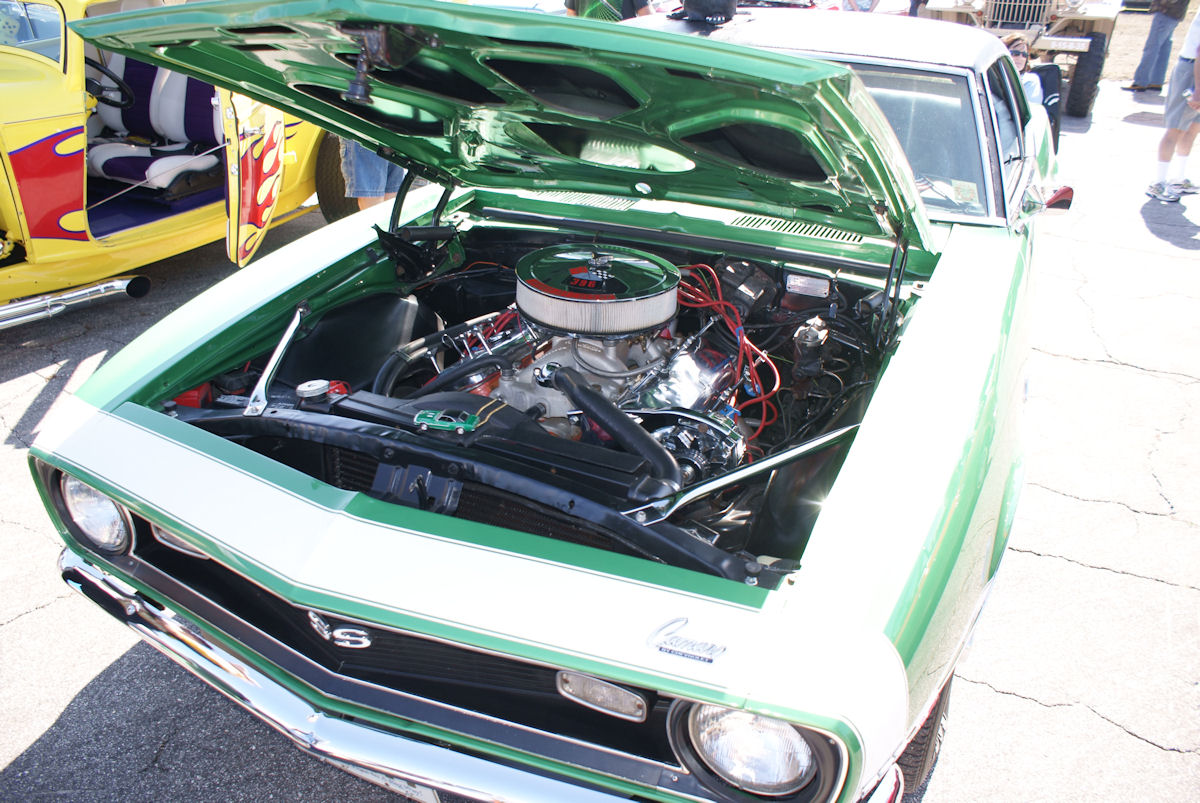
1968 SS 396 engine

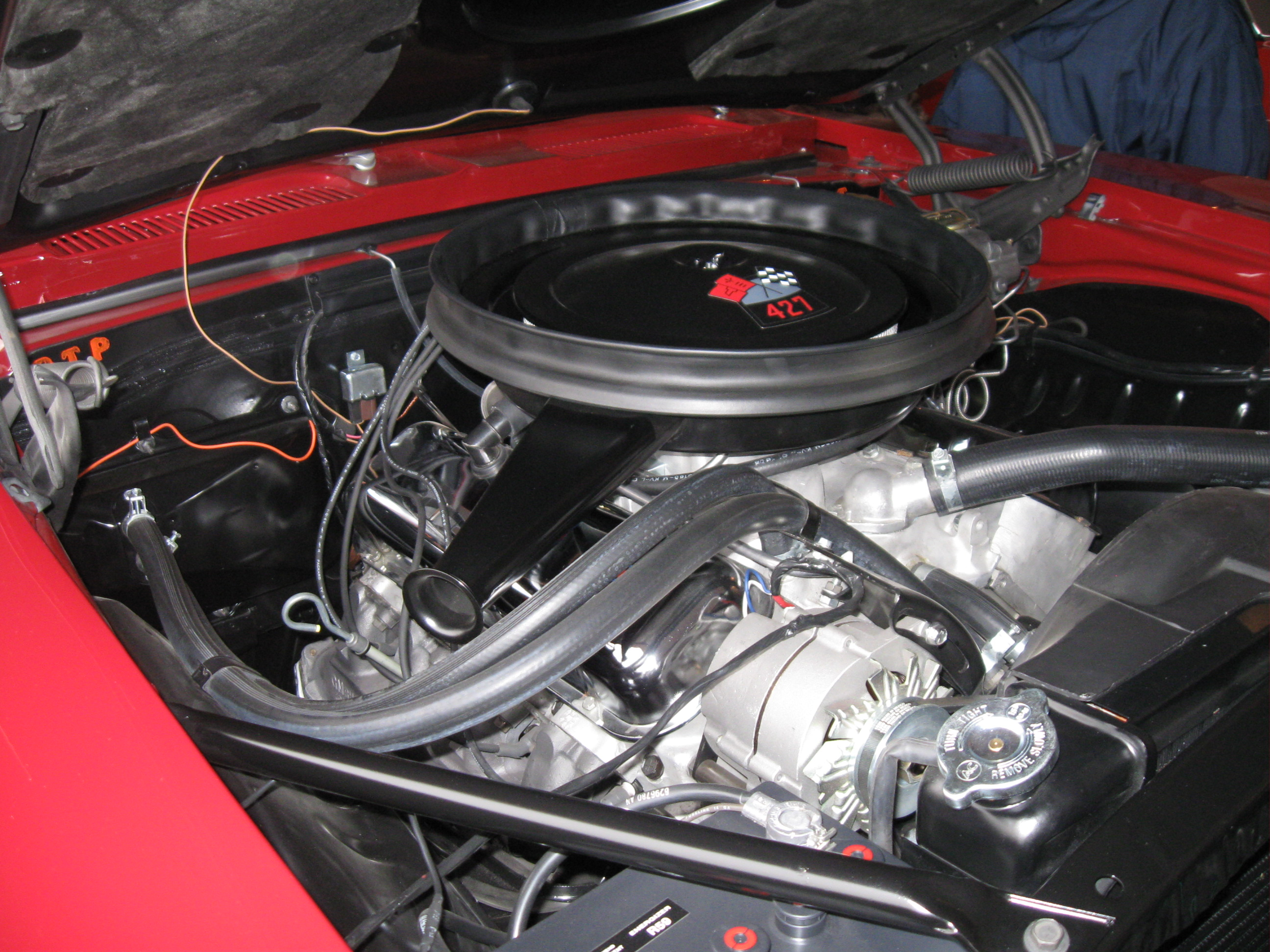
427 aluminum engine

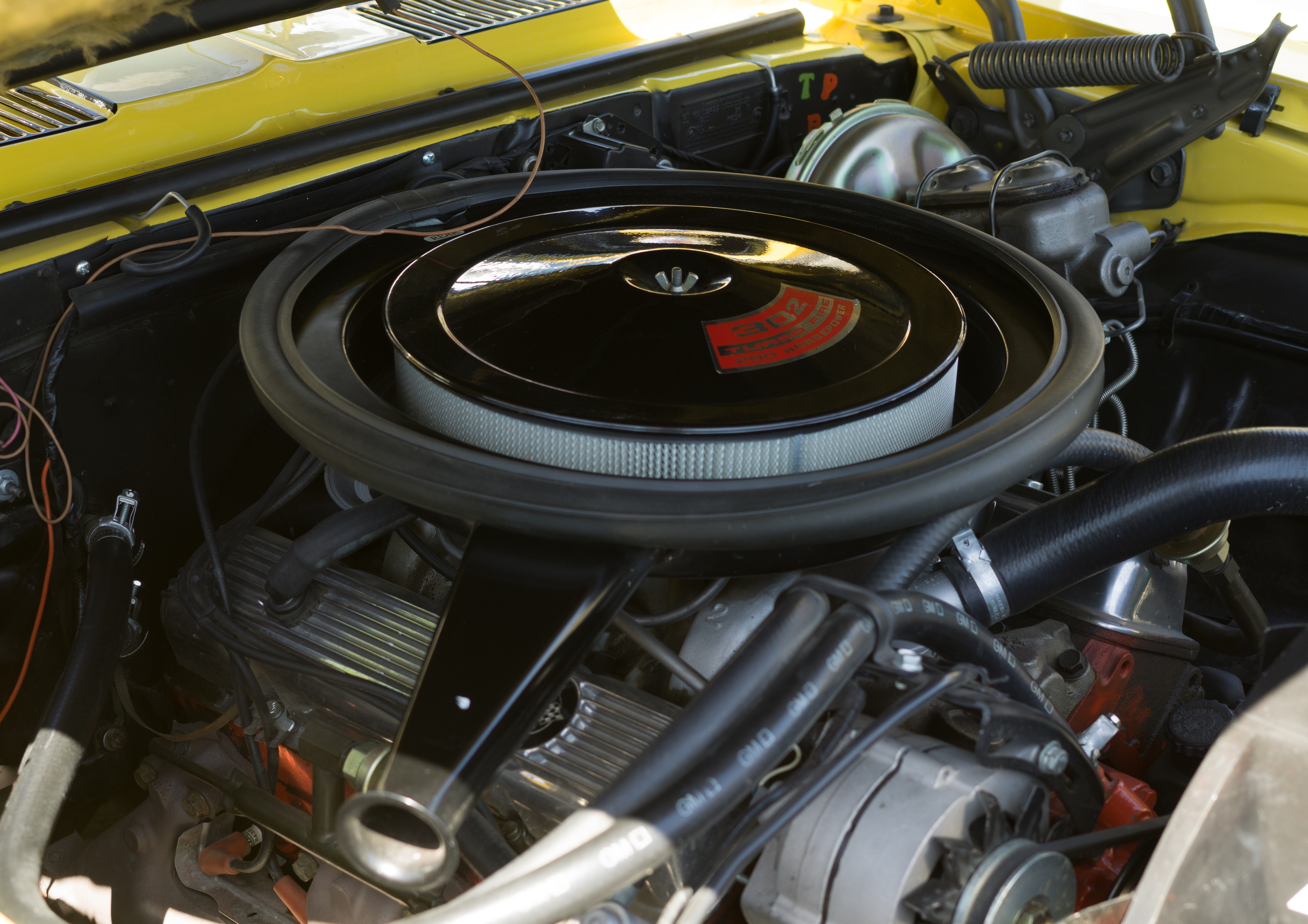
1969 Camaro Z28 only 302 Cubic inch, 290 Hp Engine.

Chevrolet Camaro	230	250	302	307	327		350				396				427	
Year	1967–69	1967–69	1967–69	from 01/1969	until 12/1968		until 12/1968	from 01/1969	until 12/1968	from 01/1969	1967–69	from 1968	1967–69	from 1968	only 1969	
Order code	L26	L22	Z28	L14	LF7	L30	LM1	L65	L48		L35	L34	L78	L78/L89	COPO 9561 L72	COPO 9560 ZL1
Engine name	Turbo-Thrift		Turbo-Fire (Small Block Chevrolet)								Turbo-Jet (Big Block Chevrolet)					
Type	straight-six engine		V8 engine													
Engine block	cast Iron															aluminium
Cylinder head	cast iron cylinder head, 2 valves per cylinder													aluminium cylinder head, 2 valves per cylinder		
Valvetrain	OHV, gear drive		OHV, timing chain													
Displacement	230 in^{3} (3769 cm^{3})	250 in^{3} (4093 cm^{3})	302 in^{3} (4942 cm^{3})	307 in^{3} (5031 cm^{3})	327 in^{3} (5354 cm^{3})		350 in^{3} (5733 cm^{3})				396 in^{3} (6489 cm^{3})				427 in^{3} (6997 cm^{3})	
Bore × stroke	3.875 in × 3.25 in (98.4 mm × 82.6 mm)	3.875 in × 3.531 in (98.4 mm × 89.7 mm)	4 in × 3 in (101.6 mm × 76.2 mm)	3.875 in × 3.25 in (98.4 mm × 82.6 mm)	4 in × 3.25 in (101.6 mm × 82.6 mm)		4 in × 3.48 in (101.6 mm × 88.4 mm)				4.094 in × 3.76 in (104 mm × 95.5 mm)				4.25 in × 3.76 in (108 mm × 95.5 mm)	
Power @ rpm	140 bhp @ 4400	155 bhp @ 4200	290 bhp @ 5800	200 bhp @ 4600	210 bhp @ 4600	275 bhp @ 4800	255 bhp @ 4800	250 bhp @ 4800	295 bhp @ 4800	300 bhp @ 4800	325 bhp @ 4800	350 bhp @ 5200	375 bhp @ 5600		425 bhp @ 5600	430 bhp @ 5200
max. torque @ rpm	220 lb (298 Nm_{f}·ft) @ 1600	235 lb (319 Nm_{f}·ft) @ 1600	290 lb (393 Nm_{f}·ft) @ 4200	300 lb (407 Nm_{f}·ft) @ 2400	320 lb (434 Nm_{f}·ft) @ 2400	355 lb (481 Nm_{f}·ft) @ 3200	365 lb (495 Nm_{f}·ft) @ 3200	345 lb (468 Nm_{f}·ft) @ 2800	380 lb (515 Nm_{f}·ft) @ 3200		410 lb (556 Nm_{f}·ft) @ 3200	415 lb (563 Nm_{f}·ft) @ 3400	415 lb (563 Nm_{f}·ft) @ 3600		460 lb (624 Nm_{f}·ft) @ 4000	450 lb (610 Nm_{f}·ft) @ 4400
Compression	8.5 : 1		11.0 : 1	9.0 : 1	8.75 : 1	10.0 : 1	9.0 : 1		10.25 : 1	9.0 : 1	10.25 : 1		11.0 : 1		12.0 : 1	12.5 : 1
Fuel system	carburetor 1bbl		carburetor 4bbl	carburetor 2bbl		carburetor 4bbl			carburetor 2bbl	carburetor 4bbl						
