= Counting Cars =

American reality television series

- The cast (from left to right): Kevin Mack, Danny Koker, Horny Mike and Scott Jones
- Genre: Reality television
- Created by: Joel Patterson
- Directed by: Jonathan Wyche
- Starring: Danny Koker
- Country of origin: United States
- Original language: English
- No. of seasons: 10
- No. of episodes: 184 (list of episodes)

Production
- Executive producers: For Leftfield Pictures: Brent Montgomery; David George; Shawn Witt; Simon Thomas; Danny Koker; Joel Patterson; For History: Zachary Behr; Julian Hobbs; Ed de Rivaz
- Editors: Ducan Adams; Eric Dow; Phillip Chernyak
- Running time: 22 minutes
- Production company: Leftfield Pictures

Original release
- Network: History
- Release: August 13, 2012 – December 1, 2021

Related
- Pawn Stars; American Restoration

Counting Cars is an American reality television series shown on History Channel and produced by Leftfield Pictures. The series, which was the third spin-off of Pawn Stars, was filmed in Las Vegas, where it chronicled the daily activities at Count's Kustoms, an automobile restoration and customization company owned and operated by Danny Koker a.k.a. The Count, who previously appeared as a recurring expert on Pawn Stars. In a format similar to another Pawn Stars spin-off, American Restoration, the series followed Koker and his staff as they restored and modified classic automobiles and motorcycles.

== Production history ==
Counting Cars is an American reality-television series, shown on History, and produced by Leftfield Pictures. The series is the third spinoff of the TV series Pawn Stars, following American Restoration and Cajun Pawn Stars. It is filmed in Las Vegas, where it chronicles the daily activities at Count's Kustoms, an automobile restoration and customization company owned and operated by legendary Danny Koker, who previously appeared as a recurring expert on Pawn Stars. In a format similar to American Restoration, the series follows Koker and his staff as they restore and modify classic automobiles and motorcycles, and documents the occasional conflict among the cast members.

The series debuted August 13, 2012, after Pawn Stars before assuming its regular Tuesday time slot the following day.

The show's initial executive producers were History's Zachary Behr and Julian Hobbs, and Leftfield Pictures' Brent Montgomery, David George, and Shawn Witt. The series was created by co-executive producer Joel Patterson. By mid-2014, Behr and Ed de Rivaz were History's executive producers on the show, with Tom Romita and Jonathan Wyche joining the three Leftfield executive producers as co-executive producers. In early 2015, Simon Thomas had joined as a fourth Leftfield executive producer, and Sean Moran had succeeded Romita as a co-executive producer.

== Episodes ==
Season	Episodes	Originally aired	
Season	Episodes	First aired	Last aired
1	13	August 13, 2012	September 25, 2012
2	26	April 9, 2013	July 30, 2013
3	26	January 7, 2014	August 26, 2014
4	35	February 24, 2015	September 22, 2015
5	14	February 16, 2016	April 5, 2016
6	24	July 5, 2016	August 16, 2016
7	19	January 28, 2017	October 31, 2017
8	17	July 10, 2018	November 6, 2018
9	10	June 3, 2020	July 8, 2020
10	10	September 15, 2021	December 1, 2021

== Cast ==
- Danny "The Count" Koker is the owner of Count's Kustoms, a shop devoted to the repair and restoration of motor vehicles, automobiles, and motorcycles in particular. The shop's name is derived from Koker's stint as part-owner of local independent station KFBT (now KVCW), during which he hosted a weekly B-movie showcase, Saturday Fright at the Movies, as "Count Cool Rider". Koker, who grew up in Cleveland and Detroit, is a self-taught mechanic who comes from a family of Ford Motor Company employees. He also heads a Las Vegas hard rock band, Count's 77.
- Scott Jones was the manager of Count's Kustoms, and Danny's bookkeeper. Scott left between the second and third seasons and is only mentioned briefly in the third-season premiere (having moved to Tennessee after the birth of his son).
- Kevin Mack is Danny's right-hand man and best friend for the past 20 years by the series premiere.He goes out with Danny to search for cool automobiles.
- Michael "Horny Mike" Henry is an airbrush artist. "Horny" refers to his horn style that he puts on everything.
- Roli Szabo is the shop's detailer, responsible for cleaning and polishing of all the vehicles on which Count's Kustoms works. After Season 6, Roli left Count's Kustoms, on good terms. He remains in Las Vegas, where he has opened his own detailing shop, Rock N' Roli Kustom Detailing. Roli is from Hungary.
- Shannon Aikau is the bike shop manager and lead builder whom Danny lauds for his fabrication and engineering skills, referring to him as the "A-Number One" in the bike shop.. He has built hundreds of custom motorcycles.
- Ryan Evans is the head painter and graphic artist. Began working with Shannon in the bike shop. Is now Danny's "main man" when it comes to custom paint.
- Big Ryan is Danny's project scout, parts expert, and picker, with over 15 years of experience.
- Harry "Grandpa" Rome Sr. is an employee who does body work at the shop.
- Joseph "Doc" Duggan integrates technology in working with the cars or adding advanced technological features with the classics.
- George is a mechanic who has worked at the shop for years.

== See also ==
- List of television shows set in Las Vegas
