= Yenko Camaro =

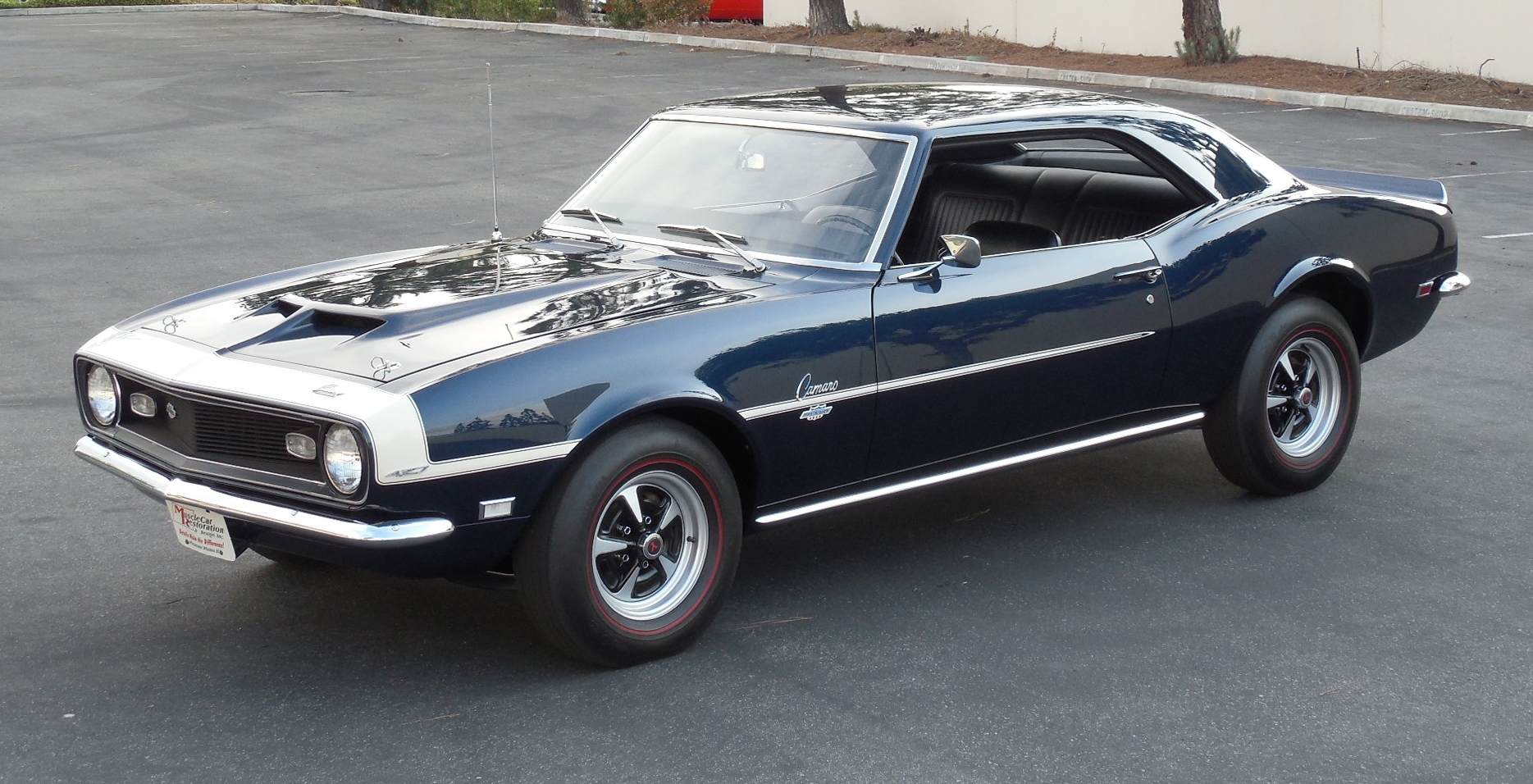
- 1968 Yenko Super Camaro YS8011

Overview
- Manufacturer: Chevrolet (General Motors)
- Production: 1967–1969
- Assembly: Norwood, Ohio

Body and chassis
- Class: pony car muscle car sports car
- Body style: 2-door coupe
- Layout: FR layout
- Platform: F-body

Powertrain
- Engine: 427cid (7.0L) Chevrolet V8
- Transmission: 4-speed manual 3-speed automatic

The Yenko Super Camaro was a modified Chevrolet Camaro prepared by Yenko Chevrolet, developed by the dealership owner and racer, Don Yenko, and subsequently aided by special parts ordering directly through Chevrolet.

The Yenko dealership did not merely install performance parts, it also made modifications and provided race track ready tuning.

== Background ==
When the Camaro debuted, a General Motors corporate edict prevented it from carrying an engine larger than 400 in³ (6.6 L) V8. This put the Camaro at a disadvantage with pony car rival Plymouth Barracuda since Plymouth had no such limit. Although Ford did not, its largest offering in the Mustang, the 390 V8, was six cubic inches smaller than the largest Chevrolet engine available in a Camaro (396). Don Yenko and others knew there was a market for a more powerful Camaro and found ways around the GM limit.

== 1967 ==
Yenko ordered L78 equipped SS Camaros and swapped in the Chevrolet Corvette's L72 427 in³ (7.0 L) V8. The cars came with a 4.10 rear end and heavy-duty suspension. The approximate number of cars produced is 54. Yenko also installed a fiberglass replacement hood similar to the "Stinger" hood featured on 1967 big-block Corvettes. The Camaros were equipped with a M21 transmission. The horsepower was rated at 450 hp (336 kW).

== 1968 ==
Encouraged by the success of the 1967 model, Yenko continued to produce his Yenko Super Camaros for 1968. The 1968 Yenko Super Camaros started life as Super Sports with L78 396 in³ 375 hp (280 kW) hp engine and close ratio 4-speed Muncie transmission. Yenko also ordered the cars with COPO 9737 which included a 140 mph (230 km/h) speedometer, a larger 1 1/8th inch front anti-roll bar, and a special trim tag. Yenko swapped out the factory 396 in³ big-block for the L72 427 in³ 450 hp (336 kW) big-block reusing the rest of the 396 in³ engine's components including the heads, carburetor, intake manifold, etc. He swapped the stock hood for a twin-snorkel fiberglass hood, added Pontiac's 14"x6" steel wheels with special Yenko caps, and placed Yenko emblems on the front grille, front fenders and tail panel. 427 emblems were added to the tail panel and front fenders as well. The cars had a Yenko Super Camaro serial-numbered tag in the driver's side door jamb and Stewart Warner pedestal-mounted tachometer and gauges were installed in the interior. Early cars got a rear spoiler made for Yenko, and later cars all got factory spoilers front and rear. The recognized production number for these cars is approximately 64 cars converted, with well less than half of that number known to exist today.

== 1969 ==
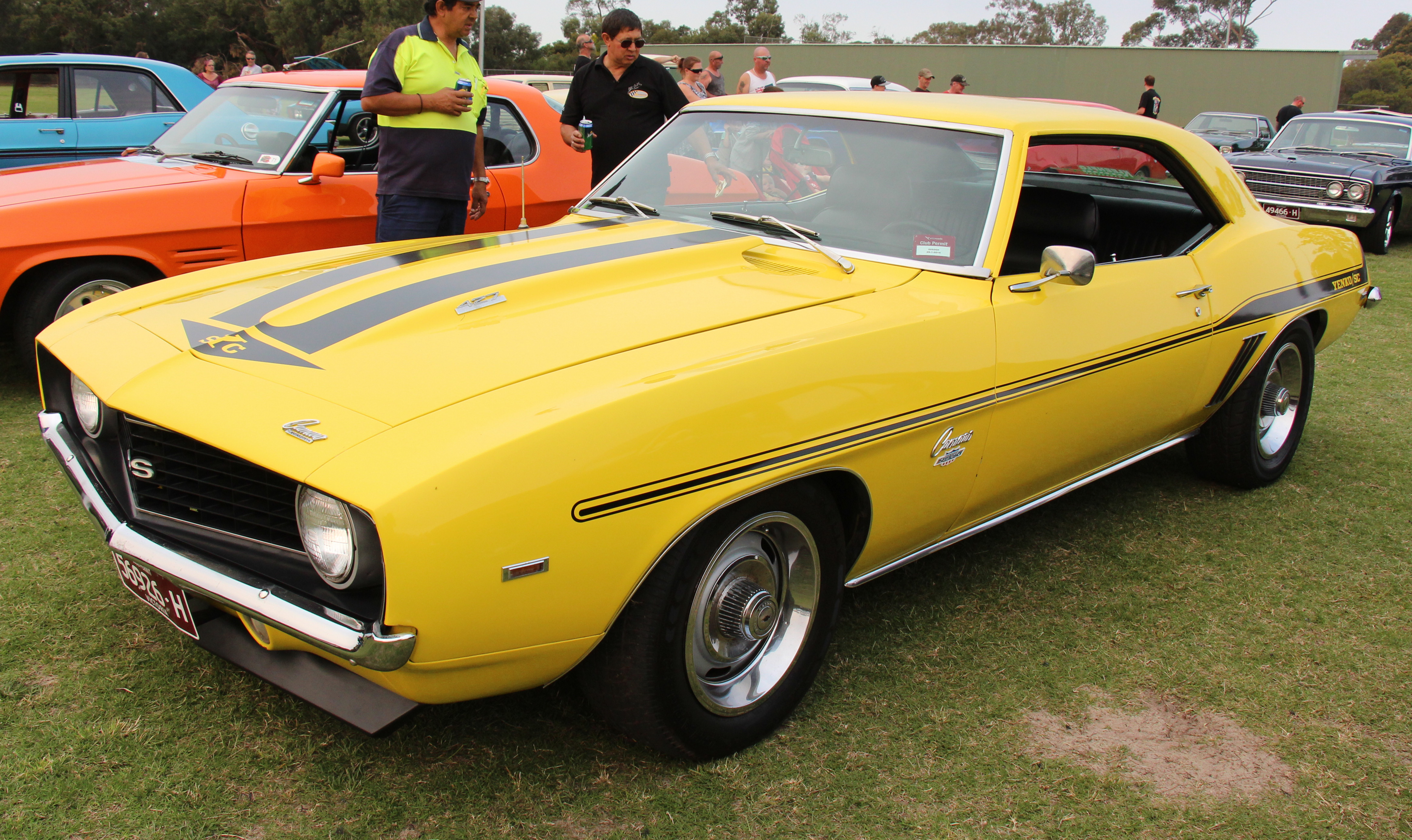
1969 Chevrolet Camaro Yenko/SC 427

For 1969, the dealership worked with Chevrolet to have the L72 engines installed on the factory assembly line using a Central Office Production Order, or COPO. The orders included power disc brakes, spoilers, cowl-induction hood, a 4.10 Positraction rear end with gears that were heat treated for strength, a bigger front anti-roll bar, and a heavy-duty 4-row radiator. Buyers of the car had the option of either the M-21 four speed or the Turbo Hydramatic 400 automatic transmission. A total of 201 cars were sold in 1969, 171 with four speed transmissions and 30 with automatic transmissions. Yenko rounded out the visual package with special "Yenko 427" badges, stripes down the sides and hood, and the sYc (Yenko Super Car) on the headrests. According to the Camaro Research Group, standard black interior (code 711) was the only interior ordered by Yenko in 69.

== 1981 ==
The 1981 Yenko Turbo Z was based on a 1981 Camaro. Don Yenko's comments on the car are:

From a performance standpoint, cars have shown a slow but steady decline in the last 10 years. Low compression engines to accommodate low octane fuel, are now the norm. Ever-increasing numbers of emissions controls have sapped their share of horsepower from once potent engines. To recover these accumulated horsepower losses without increasing pollution presents a real challenge. After months of testing and development we have done it. Working closely with some competent people at Turbo International a system emerged that does everything we hoped for. This system, like all others, captures the energy to improve the induction of fuel/air mixture. The similarity to the other systems stops right here. Our system uses no priority valve so there's no turbo-lag. We don't have a waste gate to malfunction either. And since all of the fuel entering the engine is "processed" through the turbo, you get better fuel economy and improved response even without being in boost. Every nut, bolt and fitting used in this system is the best available. This has all been developed with each and every emission control connected and functional.

== 1969 Continuation Series ==
In 2007, a company in North Carolina called Classic Automotive Restoration Specialists restarted production of the 1969 Yenko Camaro. Don Yenko sold 201 of his famous COPO-program Camaros out of his Canonsburg, PA dealership. As reported in the March '08 issue of Muscle Car Review, the vehicle is a fully licensed and certified Yenko starting at #202. The 427 in³ engine under the hood was built by GM who has brought back the big block engines from the muscle car era. The rest of the components took 2½ years to track down the original tooling. Options offered on the vehicle are the same as was available in 1969 including paint colors. The car costs around 60% less than some of the current 43-year-old Yenko Camaro survivors but drives like the old car would have when it was new from the dealership. Two known people own Yenko's Camaros.

== 2010 ==
A new Yenko Camaro based on the new 2010 Camaro platform was introduced at SEMA 2009. The new engine is a supercharged version of GM's LS3, the 6.2-liter V8 that comes standard with the Camaro SS. Since it is only the Phase I Yenko, it is expected that Phase II and Phase III Yenkos are coming which will have a Z06-sourced LS7 427 in³ engine and possibly even an LS9.

== 2016-2020 ==
In 2016 Specialty Vehicle Engineering, Inc. announced that they'll be making custom SYC Yenko Camaros based on the new sixth generation Chevrolet Camaro these cars featured a custom Supercharged LT1 V8 rating from 750Hp-1000hp.

For 2024 Yenko Camaros will come out in three stages ranging from 1050 HP automatic or manual, aluminum block LT4 Stage 1, to manual only 1500 HP stage 3 based on GM's L8T iron block.

== See also ==
- Yenko Chevrolet
- Don Yenko
