= Yenko Chevrolet =

Car dealership for modified sports cars

Company logo

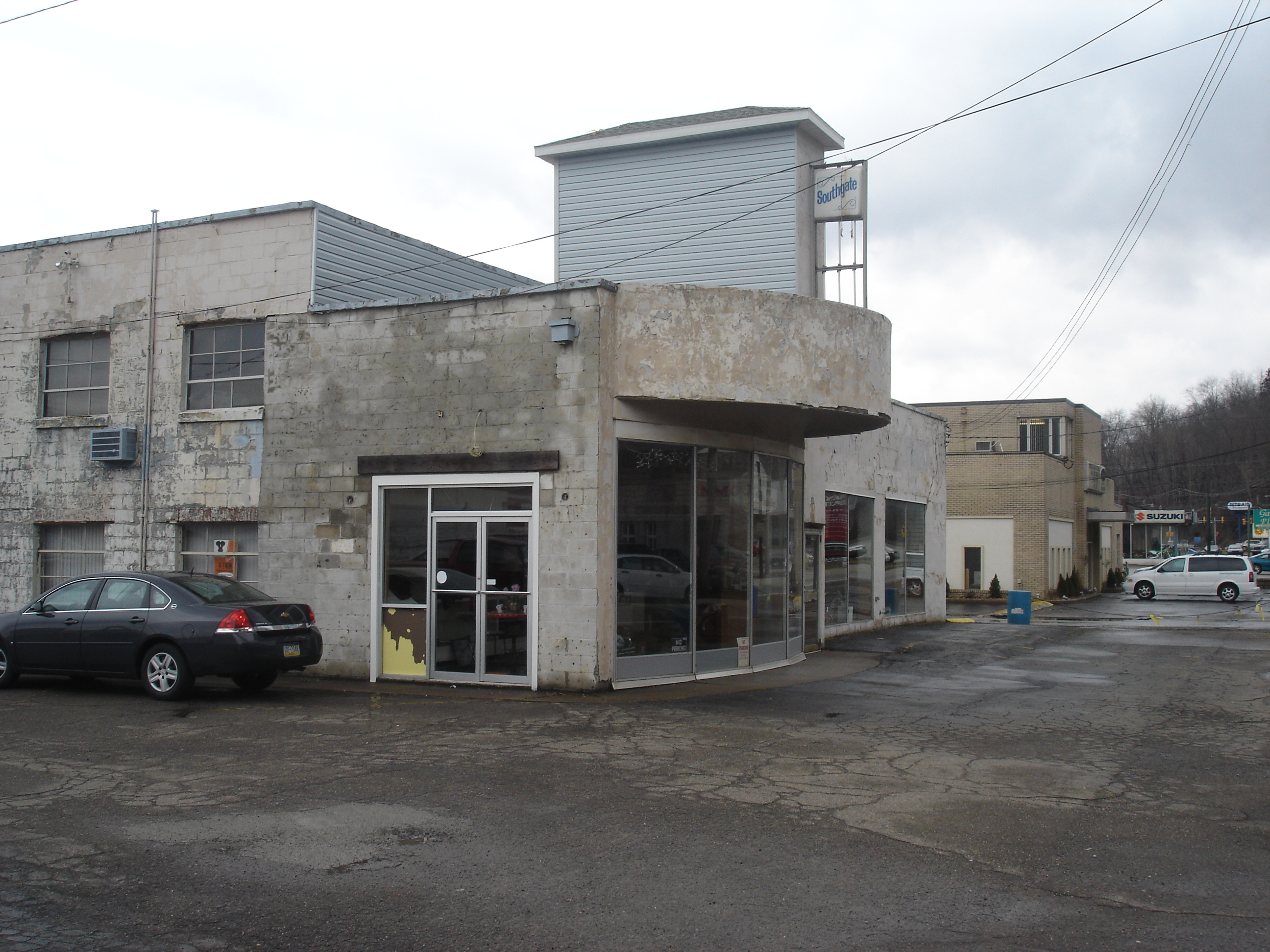
The former Yenko Chevrolet building as of March 2008

Yenko Chevrolet was a Chevrolet dealership located at 575 West Pike Street in Canonsburg, Pennsylvania. Operating from 1949 to 1982, the dealership is best known for selling customized sports cars during the late 1960s. Referred to presently as "Yenkos," they are among the most collectible 1960s vehicles.

== History ==
Yenko Chevrolet's history dates back to 1929, the year Frank Yenko opened a dealership for selling Durant cars. After the Durant company ended in 1932, Yenko opened a Chevrolet dealership in Pennsylvania in Bentleyville in 1934. In 1949, Yenko opened a second Chevrolet dealership in Canonsburg, nearby in the same state.

In 1957, Frank's son Don Yenko assumed ownership of the dealership. Known for his modified Chevrolets, Don managed the dealership until 1982, at which time he sold the business.

== Custom Cars ==
In 1966, Frank Yenko was impressed with the late model Chevrolet Corvair's handling, and decided to apply for SCCA approval of the Corsa model for racing. The sanctioning body approved the cars with back seat removed and upgrades to the Corsa engine increasing horsepower and torque. The 100 1966 Corsas that received certification were all painted white and most had blue striping, and were named "Yenko Stingers".

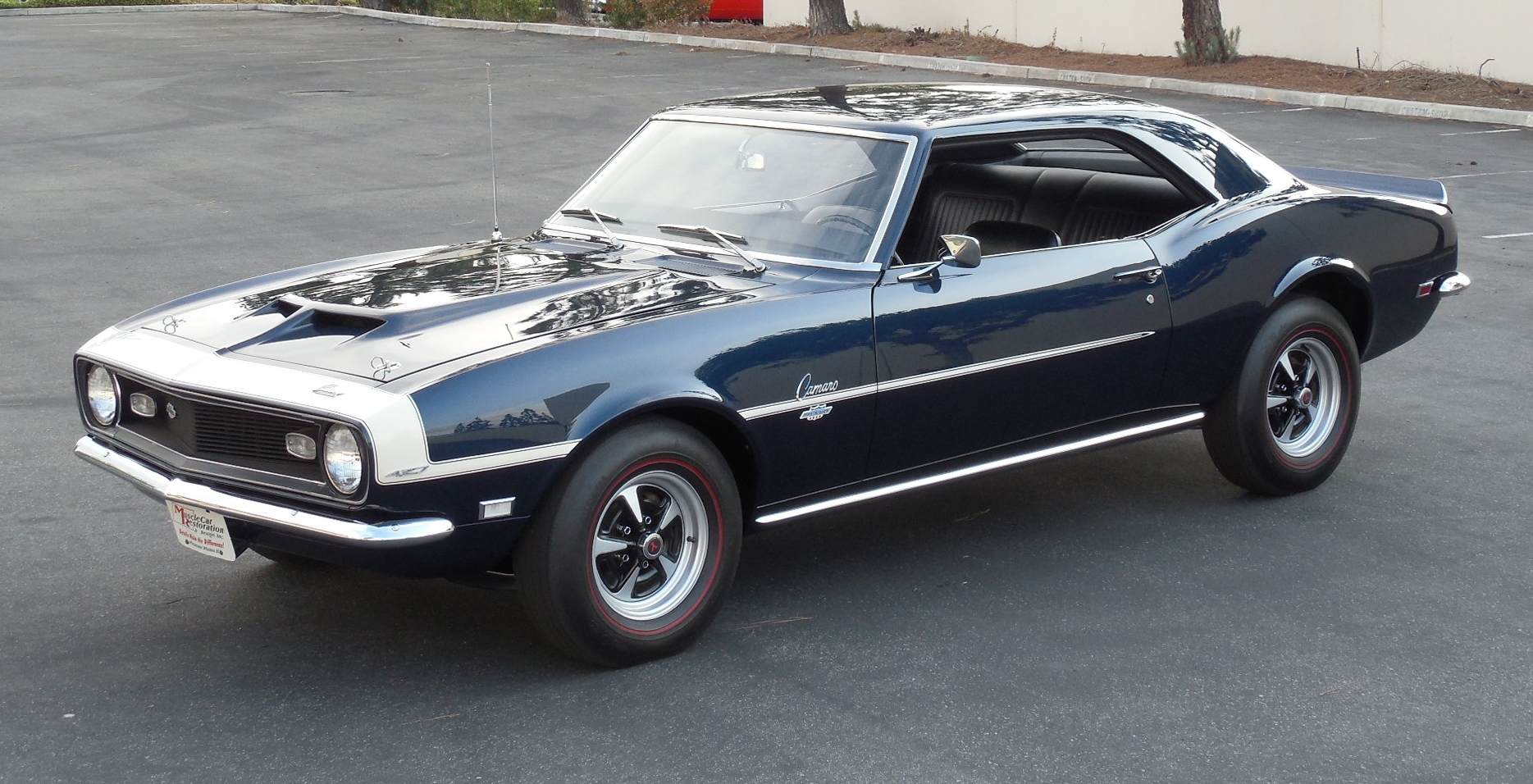
1968 Yenko Super Camaro

Yenko continued to modify Corvair coupes as Stingers for the rest of the car's production run. The last Stinger was a 1969 coupe, after which Corvair production ceased at Willow Run, Michigan. Charlie Doerge wrote a book on the Yenko Stinger and some of Don's escapades in 2011. The book lists many original and subsequent owners, as well as known racing history with much information on all of the cars that were produced. Jay Leno in a video has declared it "the bible for Yenko Stinger owners".

When Camaros, classifiable as a "pony car", became available in 1967, Yenko transferred Chevrolet's 427 cubic inch (7 L), 425hp (317 kW) L-72 engine (along with other high-performance parts) into some Camaros, creating the Yenko Camaro. The 1967 & 1968 427 Camaros were so popular that, in 1969, Yenko used Chevrolet's Central Office Production Order (COPO) system to have L-72 engines installed into Chevrolet Camaros and Chevelles.

During 1971 and 1972, Yenko sold Yenko Stinger Vegas. Based on the Chevrolet Vega GT Hatchback, Stinger Vegas included front and rear spoilers and Yenko Stinger side striping and a special COPO engine with alloy-plated forged aluminum pistons. The modified Vega aluminum-block 2.3 inline 4 with a turbocharger and 155 hp required a 50,000 mile test for EPA certification and Don Yenko eventually decided against using the turbochargers. Chevrolet was not interested in the marketing potential of a Turbo version as neither the Yenko-requested higher-compression engine blocks nor factory equipped turbo engines were ever built. The Stinger Vega was offered from Yenko Chevrolet through 1972 without turbochargers installed, but Yenko did offer the turbochargers as an aftermarket kit.
The high performance and limited production of all Yenko-modified cars makes them valuable and prized to collectors.

== Production numbers ==
Stinger
Year	Corvair	Vega
1966	100	—N/a
1967	14	—N/a
1969	1	—N/a
1971	—N/a	200
1972	—N/a	200
1973	—N/a	Unknown

Super Camaro (Note: Name for 1967 and 1968 models. All 1969s were Super Cars.) and Super Car
Year	Camaro	Chevelle	Nova
1967	54	—N/a	—N/a
1968	64	—N/a	—N/a
1969	198	99	38

Nova
Year	Nova
1970	175

Turbo Z
Year	Camaro
1981	19

== See also ==
- Don Yenko
- Yenko Camaro
- Chevrolet Corvair: Yenko Stinger
- Chevrolet Vega
