= Hogs and Heifers =

American chain of bars

Coordinates: 40.7410°N 74.0072°W

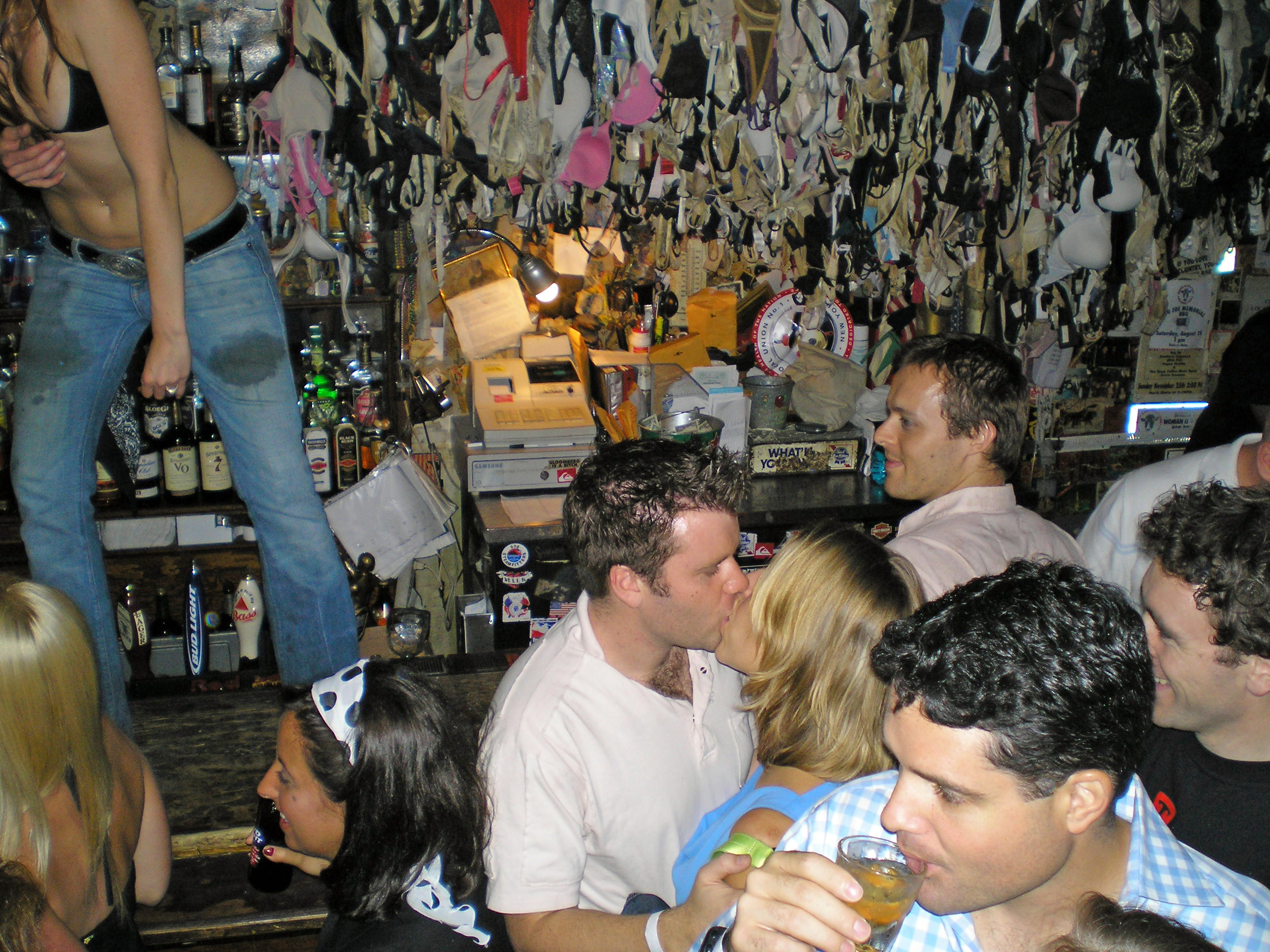
Brassieres contributed by patrons

Hogs and Heifers Saloon is a small chain of bars. The original bar opened in 1992 in the Meatpacking District of Manhattan, in New York City. A second location was opened on 1st Avenue between 95th and 96th Streets in Manhattan by early 2000. A third opened in downtown Las Vegas adjacent to the Fremont Street Experience.

== History ==
After a drunk patron started a tradition by throwing her bra onto the bar, the New York Hogs and Heifers' walls and ceilings were covered with approximately 18,000 bras, including one from Julia Roberts, whose photo is also on the wall. Allan Dell, the owner, said that he wanted the walls to be covered in stuff and the bar to have the look and feel of a gin mill.

Hogs and Heifers' bartenders, and some patrons, originally danced at the bar, but in 1997 the New York City Department of Consumer Affairs raided and briefly closed the establishment for violating a regulation that required a cabaret license in order to permit dancing.

Hogs and Heifers' New York location closed in the summer of 2015 due to a rent increase.

== See also ==
- Biker bar
