= Don Yenko =

American car dealer & racecar driver (1927-1987)

Donald "Don" Frank Yenko
- Born: May 27, 1927; Bentleyville, Pennsylvania, U.S.
- Died: March 5, 1987 (aged 59); Charleston, West Virginia, U.S.
- Occupations: Car dealer, racecar driver
- Known for: Building high performance cars
- Spouse: Hope
- Children: 2

Donald Frank Yenko (May 27, 1927 – March 5, 1987) was an American car dealer and racecar driver best known for creating the Yenko Camaro, a high-performance version of the Chevrolet Camaro.

== Biography ==
=== Early life ===
Yenko grew up in Bentleyville, Pennsylvania to parents of Slovene origin. He learned to fly an airplane at the age of 16 and went on to serve in the United States Air Force, before attending the Pennsylvania State University. While a student at Penn State, Yenko started the school's first flying club, was president of the debating club, and a member of the Kappa Delta Rho fraternity.

=== Career ===
In the 1950s and 1970s, Yenko gained international acclaim for racing Corvettes in regional races as well as prestigious endurance contests including 24 Hours of Le Mans. He was a four-time Sports Car Club of America national driving champion.

In 1957, Yenko set up a performance shop for Chevrolet vehicles at the family's Chevrolet dealership in Canonsburg, Pennsylvania. The customers could either order high performance parts or have their car modified by Yenko's mechanics. The first popular aftermarket car made by Yenko came in 1965, in the form of a modified version of the Chevrolet Corvair. Named "The Stinger", these Corvairs were modified with a variety of different body accessories, engine upgrades that produced outputs of up to 240 hp, as well as upgrades in steering, transmissions, suspension, and positraction differentials. A total of 185 Stingers are believed to have been built between 1965 and 1967. In 1967, when Chevrolet began selling the Camaro, Yenko began to modify SS Camaros by replacing the original L-78 396 in^{3} (6.5 L) engine with a Chevrolet Corvette's L-72 427 in^{3} (7.0 L) and upgrade the rear axle and suspensions. He also modified other Chevrolet vehicles like Chevelle and Nova by fitting them with L-72 engines. This limited series of cars sometimes began to take the name "sYc" (standing for Yenko Super Car), after the graphics found on the hoods and head rests.

The 1970s saw the decline in muscle cars due to higher insurance premiums and tighter emission rules. Yenko shrewdly countered by placing his unique touch on the 1970 Nova. Instead of placing a big block 427 c.i. in his special Nova he convinced GM to put a very potent small block 350 c.i. (360 h.p.) that the new Z-28 Camaro and LT1 Corvette shared. Additionally, the new "Yenko Deuce", as it was known, had extensive suspension, transmission, and rear axle upgrades along with some very lively stripes, badges, and interior decals. A bit later in the decade, Yenko began to modify the Chevrolet Vega with spoilers, turbochargers, and design graphics, dubbing it the "Yenko Stinger II". Due to difficulties with United States Environmental Protection Agency certification, he only sold the modified Vega without a turbocharger. Instead, the turbocharger sold separately at the Yenko dealership.

In 1972, Yenko stopped selling modified cars and began publishing a performance parts catalog from cosmetic modification to engine modification. One of his notable products was the ZL-1 engine, which he produced under permission from Chevrolet. In 1981, Yenko made his last modification, the Turbo Z Camaro. He added a turbocharger to 350 in^{3} (5.7 L) engine.

In addition to Chevrolet, Yenko dealerships included Porsche, Audi, Fiat, Honda, Subaru and Saab.

=== Death ===
Yenko, along with his three passengers, died on March 5, 1987 while bringing his Cessna 210 in for a landing near Charleston, West Virginia. The landing was hard, causing the aircraft to bounce and Yenko to lose control. It then hit a dirt bank, fell into a ravine and crashed. He was 59 years old.

== See also ==
- Yenko Camaro
- Yenko Chevrolet
