= Marini's on 57 =

Restaurant information
- Established: 2012
- Owner: Modesto Marini
- Food type: Italian Gastronomy
- Location: Level 57, Petronas Tower 3, Persiaran KLCC, Kuala Lumpur, Federal Territory, 50088, Malaysia
- Reservations: Yes
- Website: marinis57.com

Marini's on 57 is the highest rooftop bar, restaurant, and lounge in Malaysia. Located on the 57th floor of Petronas Tower 3 in Kuala Lumpur, it started operations in June 2012. The establishment is owned and operated by chef restaurateur Modesto Marini.

== Description ==
Marini's on 57 is situated on the roof top of Petronas Tower 3, next to the Petronas Twin Towers in the heart of Kuala Lumpur City Centre, and provides a 360° view of the city. The establishment has a dedicated private lift that takes visitors directly to the 57th floor. The property itself is divided into three sections: a bar, a restaurant, and a lounge, all with floor-to-ceiling glass windows. It operates a dress code policy.

== Patrons ==
Marini's on 57 has hosted a number of celebrities including Tiger Woods, Formula One drivers Lewis Hamilton and Nico Rosberg, former English footballer and manager Glenn Hoddle, LPGA stars Paula Creamer and Michelle Wie, Danish tennis player Caroline Wozniacki, Award Winning singer Ed Sheeran American PGA Professional Chris Stroud, season one winner of Masterchef Whitney Miller, designer Jimmy Choo, singer Nicole Scherzinger, Rick Harrison and Corey Harrison of Pawn Stars, and Naomi Scott.

== Notable events ==
Marini's on 57 was the venue of the after-party of the 2014 Laureus World Sports Awards. In 2014, its Formula 1 party featured British House Music DJ Danny Rampling, who is widely credited as one of the original founders of the UK's rave/club scene, and his wife, Ilona Rampling.

== Album ==
In 2014, the father of Balearic Chill Out Music, DJ José Padilla, created an album to commemorate the second anniversary of Marini's on 57 called Sunset Hours Volume One. The album was launched in Ibiza, Spain, on 20 June 2014.

== Media references ==
Marini's on 57 has been featured in a number of television shows and programmes including the Travel Channel International's "Asian Times", Germany's most popular reality show, Die Geissen, MasterChef Indonesia Season 3, The Apartment Style Edition Season 2, The Apprentice Asia, and the Asian Food Channel.

== Awards ==
- Signum Virtutis (Seal of Excellence), Seven Stars Luxury Hospitality and Lifestyle Awards, presented by Prince della Torre e Tasso
- Hospitality Asia Platinum Awards 2014 – multiple awards including "Icon of the Year" for Modesto Marini, Restaurant of the Year Dining Experience, and Nightspot of the Year Outstanding Concept
- Malaysia International Gourmet Festival 2013 – multiple awards
- Expatriate Lifestyle's Best of Malaysia Travel Awards 2013
- Malaysian Tatler – Malaysia's Best Restaurants
- Top 10 in ‘My Favourite Interior Design – Restaurant Edition' Award
