= Pawn Stars Do America =

American reality television series

- Genre: Reality television
- Starring: Rick Harrison; Corey "Big Hoss" Harrison; Austin "Chumlee" Russell
- Country of origin: United States
- Original language: English
- No. of seasons: 2
- No. of episodes: 25

Production
- Executive producers: Ari Cheren; Brooke Townsend; Eli Lehrer; Evan Sutherland; Mary Donahue; Rick Harrison; Sean Moran; Shawn Witt; Tracy Whittaker
- Running time: 1 hour 21 minutes
- Production company: Leftfield Pictures

Original release
- Network: History
- Release: November 9, 2022 – present

Related
- American Restoration; Cajun Pawn Stars; Counting Cars; Pawn Stars; Pawn Stars UK; Pawnography; Pawn Stars Australia

Pawn Stars Do America is an American reality television series shown on History and produced by Leftfield Pictures. The series is filmed in multiple cities across the United States, where stars Rick Harrison, his son Corey "Big Hoss" Harrison, and Corey's long-time friend Austin "Chumlee" Russell visit each city for a 3-day event. The series debuted on November 9, 2022.

The series showcases a main focus city each episode, located in populous and historically significant locations. The cast manages an event in a designated city where attendees are invited to sell their artifacts, typically involving price haggling, and discussions of the artifact's historical background.

Alongside the main cast, the series features well known recurring experts from Pawn Stars and local experts from each city.

== Episodes ==
=== Season 1 (2022) ===
No. overall	No. in season	Title	Original release date
1	1	"Denver Gold Rush"	November 9, 2022
2	2	"Revolutionary Deals"	November 16, 2022
3	3	"San Francisco Treats"	November 23, 2022
4	4	"Emerald City Adventures"	November 30, 2022
5	5	"National Treasures"	December 7, 2022
6	6	"Southern Charms"	December 14, 2022
7	7	"Lone Star Stakes"	December 21, 2022
8	8	"Sweet Carolina"	December 28, 2022

=== Season 2 (2023-present) ===
No. overall	No. in season	Title	Original release date
9	1	"Texas Treasures"	October 25, 2023
10	2	"Sunshine State Steals"	November 1, 2023
11	3	"Bluegrass Bounty"	November 8, 2023
12	4	"Beantown Bargains"	November 15, 2023
13	5	"Fort Worth Fortunes"	November 29, 2023
14	6	"Rhode Island Riches"	December 6, 2023
15	7	"Tampa Bay Bucks"	December 13, 2023
16	8	"Derby City Deals"	December 20, 2023
17	9	"Motor City Wheelin' and Dealin'"	April 3, 2024
18	10	"Desert Deals"	April 10, 2024
19	11	"Michigan Moolah"	April 17, 2024
20	12	"Minneapolis Mementos"	April 24, 2024
21	13	"Phoenix Fortunes"	May 1, 2024
22	14	"Twin City Steals and Deals"	May 8, 2024
23	15	"Sin City Scores"	May 15, 2024
24	16	"Unpacked"	May 22, 2024
25	17	"The Deep Dish"	May 22, 2024
