= Modesto Marini =

Italian chef, restaurateur and entrepreneur

- Born: Lake Garda, Italy
- Spouse: Elizabeth Hew-Marini
- Culinary career
- Cooking style: Contemporary Italian
- Current restaurant(s): Marini's on 57 Marble 8 Mesa on 51 M Marini Grand Caffè & Terrazza MariGin Müro
- Award(s) won: Order of the Star of Italy (Cavaliere) (2016) Hospitality Asia Platinum Awards-Icon of the Year (2013) Century International Quality ERA Award (2014, Geneva) World Branding Awards – Brand of the Year Malaysia (2014–2016) Seven Stars Luxury Hospitality Awards – Signum Virtutis (2014–2016) Malaysia Tatler Dining Awards – Best Restaurateur (2020) The group’s establishments have also received: Wine Spectator Awards (USA) (2015–2025) Recognition in the Michelin Guide (2023–2025 listings) Multiple awards from the Malaysia International Gourmet Festival (MIGF)
- Website: marinisgroup.com

Cavaliere Modesto Marini is an Italian chef, restaurateur and entrepreneur based in Malaysia. He is the founder and owner of The Marini's Group, a Kuala Lumpur–based hospitality company known for operating high-end restaurants, bars and lifestyle venues.

Modesto has been described as a prominent figure in Malaysia's food and beverage industry, particularly within the fine dining and luxury hospitality segment.

He was awarded the distinguished Order of the Star of Italy in October 2016, which carries the title Cavaliere and is one of the highest civilian honours of the Italian government.

== Career ==
=== Early career ===
Modesto began his culinary career in Italy before moving to the United Kingdom, where he worked as a sous chef at Cecconi's in London's Mayfair, which was patronised by royalty and celebrities.

He relocated to Singapore at the age of 21, and later moved to Malaysia in 1995, where he established himself in the local restaurant industry.

In Malaysia, he founded Modesto's chain of Italian restaurants, which expanded regionally across Southeast Asia. By 2008, the chain had nine outlets and hosted a Ferrari party in 2000. It also hosted Formula 1 and MotoGP stars like Jarno Trulli, Valentino Rossi and Loris Capirossi; with Trulli launching his wines at the outlet. He later disposed of his shares in the chain, which also included restaurants in Singapore and Indonesia.

=== The Marini's Group ===
In 2012, Modesto opened Marini's on 57, the highest rooftop bar, restaurant and lounge in Malaysia, located at Menara 3 Petronas, Kuala Lumpur.

Following its success, he opened another two establishments in 2014 - M Marini Grand Caffè & Terrazza, Malaysia's first dedicated champagne and caviar cafè and Marble 8, a premium steakhouse in Kuala Lumpur, specialising in their own dry-aged steaks.

In later years, the group expanded with additional concepts, including:

- Mesa on 51, a Spanish–Nikkei dining and entertainment venue opened in 2024
- MariGin, a gin-focused bar concept
- Müro, a nightlife and club concept

Collectively, these venues contributed to positioning Kuala Lumpur as a destination for upscale dining and nightlife experiences.

Marini's on 57 has hosted a number of royals and celebrities such as the Crown Prince of Denmark His Royal Highness Frederik, Anna Fendi, Jarno Trulli, Max Biaggi, Tiger Woods, Bon Jovi, Eric Cantona, Formula One drivers Lewis Hamilton and Nico Rosberg, former English footballer and manager Glenn Hoddle, LPGA stars Paula Creamer and Michelle Wie, Danish tennis player Caroline Wozniacki, American PGA Professional Chris Stroud, season one winner of Masterchef Whitney Miller, designer Jimmy Choo, singer Nicole Scherzinger, and Rick Harrison and Corey Harrison of Pawn Stars. It was also the venue of the after-party of the 2014 Laureus World Sports Awards.

Annual F1 Party Paddock

2014 saw British House Music DJ Danny Rampling, who is widely credited as one of the original founders of the UK's rave/club scene, and his wife, Ilona Rampling, to perform at Marini's on 57's first Formula 1 event - Party Paddock at the Top. Subsequent years saw the likes of Joey Negro [2015] and Simon Dunmore [2016] (Founder of Defected Records) follow suit. The annual F1 Party Paddock events take place annually during F1 weekend in Kuala Lumpur, Malaysia.

== Sunset Hours Albums ==
In 2014, Modesto collaborated with the Godfather of Balearic Chill Out Music, DJ José Padilla, to create an album which would commemorate the second anniversary of the bar at Marini's on 57 called Sunset Hours Volume One. The album launched in Ibiza, Spain, on 20 June 2014.

Sunset Hours Vol.2 compiled by popular and respected melodic chill-out DJs Chris Coco (UK) and Afterlife (UK) launched in Ibiza, Spain, on 9 August 2015.

Sunset Hours Vol.3 compiled by Simon Mills (UK) launched in Ibiza, Spain, on 20 July 2016.

Album	Compilers	Year	Artists
Sunset Hours Vol.1	Jose Padilla	2014	Jose Padilla. Trevor Deep Jr. Begin Optical. Baris K. Chris Zipell. Maricopa. Bonnie & Klein. Mark Barrott. Cantoma. Andras. 40 Thieves. Razzy Bailey. No Logo. Osunlade.
Sunset Hours Vol.2	Chris Coco & Afterlife	2015	Chris Coco. Afterlife. Jose Padilla. Les Baxter. Christian Prommer. Micko Roche. Man in a Room. Vincent Delerm. DF Tram. A Forrest Mighty Black. Suba. John Beltram. Nick & Samantha. The Past Present Organisation. Coppe.
Sunset Hours Vol.3	Simon Mills	2016	Simon Mills, Napoleon, Dekoi, Manhead, Chris Coco, Jose Padilla, Mr Fingers, Farbror Resande Mac, HNNY, Hidden Spheres, Gidge, Sei A, Julian Sanza, Bent.

== Awards and recognition ==
Modesto has received several industry awards. These include:

- Hospitality Asia Platinum Awards (2013–2014)
- Order of the Star of Italy (Cavaliere), awarded by the Italian government (2016)
- Malaysia Tatler Dining Awards – Best Restaurateur (2020)
- HAPA® Awards 2026 Series: Malaysia’s Top 20 HAPA® Entrepreneurs of Excellence 2026

The Marini's Group has also received recognition from Seven Stars Luxury Hospitality Awards – Signum Virtutis (Seal of Excellence) (2014–2016), presented by Prince Della Torre e Tasso in 2014, World Branding Award under the category of Restaurant, for three consecutive years 2014–2016, and Superbrands Award (2003).

== Personal life ==
Modesto is married to Elizabeth Marini, a Malaysian entrepreneur.

The couple have been involved jointly in the development and promotion of The Marini's Group. They have two children.
