= Pawnography =

American game show (2014–2015)

- Genre: Game show
- Presented by: Christopher Titus
- Country of origin: United States
- Original language: English
- No. of seasons: 2
- No. of episodes: 30

Production
- Executive producers: Russ McCarroll; Zachary Behr; Elaine Frontain Bryant; Brent Montgomery; David George; Shawn Witt; Michael Binkow
- Production company: Leftfield Pictures

Original release
- Network: History
- Release: July 10, 2014 – January 30, 2015

Pawnography is an American game show that aired on History from July 10, 2014, to January 29, 2015. Hosted by comedian Christopher Titus and featuring Pawn Stars personalities Rick Harrison, Corey Harrison and Austin "Chumlee" Russell as panelists, the series featured two contestants answering questions for a chance to win cash and items for sale from the Gold and Silver Pawn Shop (where Pawn Stars is recorded).

== Episodes ==
=== Season 1 (2014) ===
No. overall	No. in season	Title	Original release date
1	1	"Wheel and Deal"	July 10, 2014
2	2	"Bring the Heat"	July 10, 2014
3	3	"Money Train"	July 17, 2014
4	4	"Wheel and Deal"	July 17, 2014
5	5	"Knuckle Busters"	July 24, 2014
6	6	"The Gambler"	July 24, 2014
7	7	"Saddle Battle"	July 31, 2014
8	8	"Stealing Art"	July 31, 2014
9	9	"Playing for Jeeps"	August 7, 2014
10	10	"Choose Your Weapon"	August 7, 2014

=== Season 2 (2014–15) ===
No. overall	No. in season	Title	Original release date
11	1	"Mantle Money"	November 6, 2014
12	2	"Watch Closely"	November 6, 2014
13	3	"Banana Montana"	November 13, 2014
14	4	"Duke It Out"	November 13, 2014
15	5	"The Triumph"	November 20, 2014
16	6	"Smoking Gun"	November 20, 2014
17	7	"Stuck In a Rupp"	December 4, 2014
18	8	"Silver Spoons"	December 4, 2014
19	9	"Bank Shot"	December 11, 2014
20	10	"Pulling Strings"	December 11, 2014
21	11	"Jimi That!"	December 18, 2014
22	12	"Chicken Hawk Down"	December 18, 2014
23	13	"Weight in Silver"	January 8, 2015
24	14	"Ridin' Like Robin"	January 8, 2015
25	15	"Zombie Defense"	January 15, 2015
26	16	"Motivader"	January 15, 2015
27	17	"Whizzing By"	January 22, 2015
28	18	"Flintlock and Loaded"	January 22, 2015
29	19	"Perfect Game"	January 29, 2015
30	20	"Fit for the King"	January 29, 2015

== Gameplay ==
The game is played in three rounds. In the first round, two contestants compete against Corey and Chumlee, who work together. Titus asks a series of multiple-choice toss-up questions with four answer options; $100 is awarded for each correct answer, and there is no penalty for a miss. If a contestant is in the lead when time runs out, he/she earns the chance to win an item from the shop's collection, revealed at the start of the round. If Corey and Chumlee win the round instead, the item is removed from play and returned to the shop. Rick provides occasional comments on the questions and answers. Any ties for high score between a contestant and Corey/Chumlee are broken in the contestant's favor. If the contestants tie for high score, the item at stake is carried over into the second round.

Titus then asks a $150 bonus question, open only to the contestants and having to do with an item seen in a Pawn Stars episode. The contestants separately choose answers during the commercial break after the first round. For the second round, Rick takes the place of Corey and Chumlee, and their score is transferred to him. All questions in this round are worth $200, and a second item is at stake if a contestant is in the lead at the end. The higher-scoring contestant advances to the Pawnography Showdown round, while the low scorer is eliminated from the game with no winnings. If the round ends in a tie between the contestants, Titus asks them one last question; the first contestant to answer correctly wins an additional $200 and advances.

In the Pawnography Showdown round, the surviving contestant faces Rick, Corey, and Chumlee as a team, with a third item at stake. Each side has 60 seconds to answer the same 10 open-ended questions, and must wait in a soundproof isolation booth during the other side's turn. While Corey and Chumlee can suggest answers to Rick, only his responses are counted on behalf of the trio. There is no returning to passed or missed questions, and Titus does not inform either side during the round as to which answers are correct or incorrect. However, an on-screen tally displays the correct answers and scores for the viewer's benefit. He also does not immediately reveal the final scores, instead first giving Rick and the contestant a chance to negotiate an offer (of cash and/or some of the items at stake) for the contestant to walk away from the game. If the contestant turns down Rick's final offer and has out-scored or tied the trio, they win all cash and items accumulated during the first two rounds, as well as the third item; if the trio wins the round, though, the contestant leaves with nothing.

== Production ==
The series was filmed in Las Vegas, Nevada along with Pawn Stars to allow the Harrisons to continue filming Pawn Stars without having to leave the city. The prizes on the show were chosen by the producers with assistance from the shop's CFO, Theo Spyer. According to Harrison, he did not know what items would be offered as prizes until they were revealed on the show; if the prizes were won, the producers would reimburse Harrison for the items, although it was at a large discount. Although the family patriarch, Richard "Old Man" Harrison, was offered a chance to participate, he declined the offer, saying, "I'm 73 years old. I already got a job. I don’t want another one." The series was green-lit on April 30, 2014, with History ordering ten episodes of the show. A second season of the show, which premiered on November 6, was announced on October 7, 2014.

== Reception ==
Diane Werts of Newsday gave the series a "B", saying, "America can't get enough of those Pawn Stars guys... so here they are for another weekly hour, doing what they do."

=== Ratings ===
Pawnography's July 10 premiere received 2.82 million viewers as well as 995,000 adults 18–49, making it the highest rated premiere episode of any History original since the beginning of 2014. Among adults 25–54, the series was also among the ten highest rated new summer cable series in 2014.
