= Deuandra T. Brown =

American filmmaker and actress

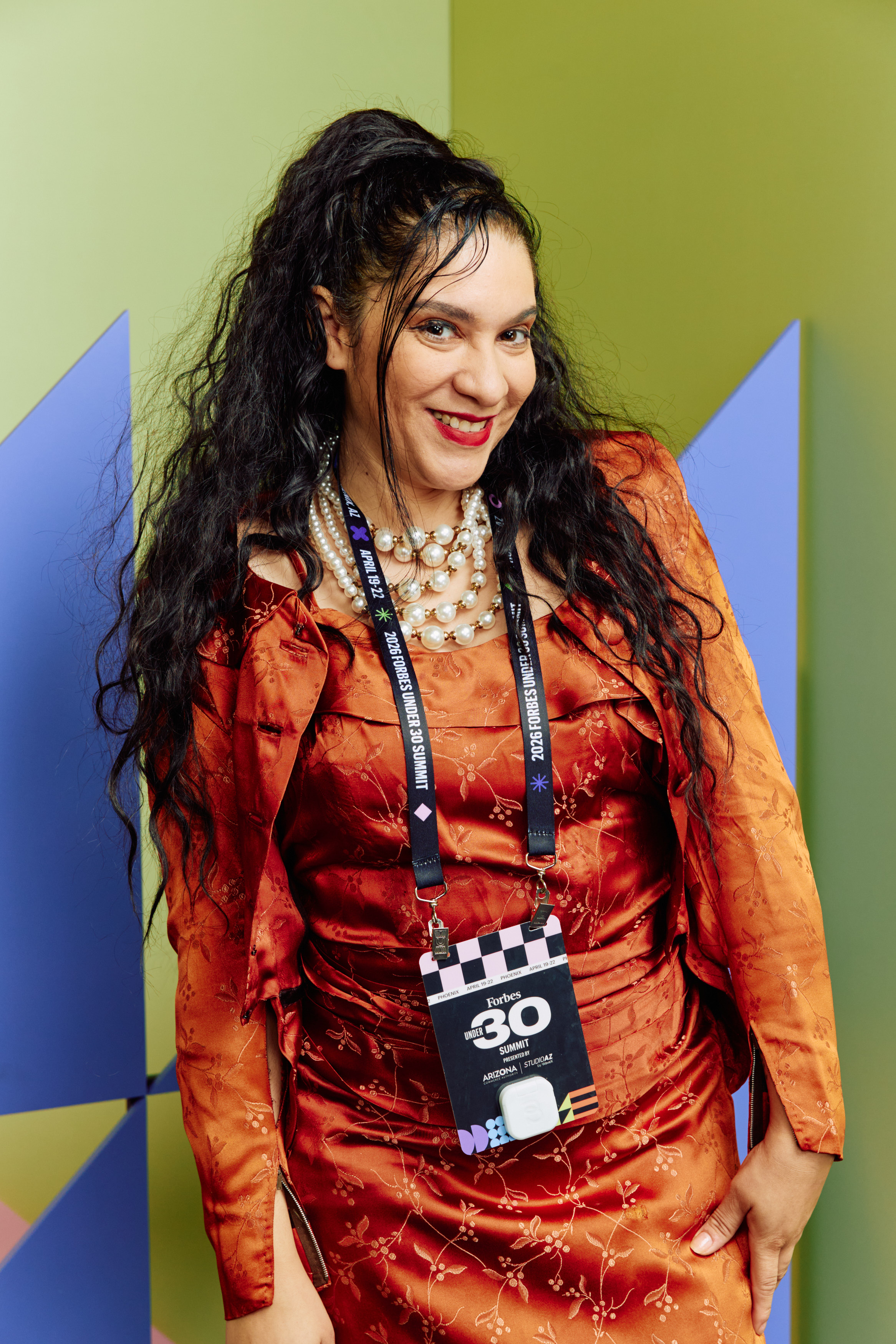
- Born: August 10, 1987 (age 39); Scottsdale, Arizona
- Occupations: Filmmaker; actress; recording artist; fashion designer; model; author
- Relatives: Reynaldo Rey (cousin)
- Website: www.deuandrabrown.com

Deuandra T. Brown is an American filmmaker, actress, recording artist, fashion designer, model, and children's book author. She is the founder and owner of Detaron Productions, Detaron Mag, Detaron TV, Detaron Records, and Detaron Couture.

Since 2010, Brown has produced and released films through her production company, Detaron Productions, serving in roles including director, writer, producer, editor, and lead actress. Since 2009, she has written, recorded, and released music through her record label, Detaron Records.

In 2024, she signed a recording agreement with MN2S Label, followed by a recording deal with Skyrocket Records in 2026.

== Life and career ==
Brown was born in Scottsdale, Arizona on August 10, 1987. She was raised by her mother, Ellen R. Brown alongside her older brother. Her cousin is actor Reynaldo Rey.

In 2006, Brown made her acting debut as an uncredited extra in the film Wild Seven. She worked as an uncredited extra in multiple studio films, including Jolene and High School Musical 3: Senior Year (both 2008), Take Me Home Tonight (2011), and The Hangover Part III (2013). During this period, she earned a Bachelor of Arts degree in Film Production.

In 2010, Brown directed and starred in her first short film, Pure Souls. She then directed her first feature-length film, Who Else to Blame? (2011), followed by Plum (2013), which became her first SAG-AFTRA agreement film, and Diamond Cobra vs the White Fox (2015), which was her first television film. Brown's recent feature-length films include Décolleté (2023), White Cobra Diamond Fox vs the Golden Eye (2024), Temps Figé (2025), and Hyped UP Bunnies (2026). Brown has also created two television series that are available on her Roku Channel Detaron TV: Heavenly Conquerors (2020–2023) and Industry Innovators (2021).

In 2025, she received an International Impact Book Award for her children's book Bijou, which was released in 2021.

In 2015, she was featured in Billboard magazine on two occasions. In July 2024, Brown was featured in New York Weekly and appeared on the cover of Vogue Weekly.

Brown auditioned for American Idol in 2006 and 2008, ultimately appearing in the season eight episode, "Auditions: Phoenix". In 2014, she appeared on MTV’s Copycat, where she performed a song by singer Alicia Keys. In 2024, Brown appeared in one episode of Pawn Stars Do America as a seller.

== Filmography ==
=== As film director/writer/producer ===
Year	Title	director	screenWriter	Producer	Notes
2010	Pure Souls	Yes	Yes	Yes	Short film
2011	Who Else to Blame?	Yes	Yes	Yes	
2011	The Tattoo of Life	Yes	Yes	Yes	Short Film
2012	Sweat Hawking	Yes	Yes	Yes	Short film
2013	Plum	Yes	Yes	Yes	
2013	Cataclysm	Yes	Yes	Yes	Short film
2014	On the Road to Christ	Yes	Yes	Yes	Short film
2015	Selfie	Yes	Yes	Yes	Short film
2015	Diamond Cobra vs the White Fox	Yes	Yes	Yes	TV movie
2016	The Missing Page	Yes	No	Yes	Short film
2017	You're Mine	Yes	Yes	Yes	Short film
2018	Face in the Mirror	Yes	Yes	Yes	Short film
2018	CraZy A$$ B!tche$	Yes	Yes	Yes	Short film
2019	Appurtenance	Yes	Yes	Yes	Short film
2019	A Larceny Christmas	Yes	Yes	Yes	TV movie
2020	Jatana	Yes	Yes	Yes	Short film
2021	Invidious	Yes	Yes	Yes	Short film
2021	Industry Innovators (the movie)	Yes	Yes	Yes	
2022	Lit A$$ B!tche$	Yes	Yes	Yes	Short film
2022	The Wrong Parking Lot	Yes	Yes	Yes	Short film
2023	Décolleté	Yes	Yes	Yes	
2024	Tormented Teddy	Yes	Yes	Yes	Short film
2024	Kora	Yes	Yes	Yes	Short film
2024	White Cobra Diamond Fox vs the Golden Eye	Yes	Yes	Yes	
2024	Molly's Paper Doll Land	Yes	Yes	Yes	Short film
2025	Dream – INK	Yes	Yes	Yes	Short film
2025	Temps Figé	Yes	Yes	Yes	
2026	Hyped UP Bunnies	Yes	Yes	Yes	
2026	The Orion Call	Yes	Yes	Yes	Short film

=== Film acting roles ===
Year	Title	Role	Notes
2006	Wild Seven	Casino Player (uncredited)	
2008	Jolene	Club Dancer (uncredited)	
2008	High School Musical 3: Senior Year	Student (uncredited)	
2009	Running on Empty Dreams	Waitress (as Deuandra Brown)	
2010	Pure Souls	Stacy	Short film, directorial debut
2011	Take Me Home Tonight	Mall Shopper (uncredited)	
2011	Who Else to Blame?	Detective January	
2011	The Tattoo of Life	Kerry Love	Short film
2012	Sweat Hawking	Herself	Short film
2013	The Hangover Part III	Local Shopper (uncredited)	
2013	Plum	Plum	
2013	Cataclysm	ZoDyac	Short film
2014	On the Road to Christ	Herself/Destiny/Angel	Short film
2015	Diamond Cobra vs the White Fox	Diamond/Tarjella	TV Movie
2015	Selfie	Herself	Short film
2016	The Missing Page	Daesha	Short film
2017	You're Mine	Heather Love	Short film
2018	Face in the Mirror	Tabatha	Short film
2018	CraZy A$$ B!tche$	Skylar Reed	Short film
2019	A Larceny Christmas	Champagne	TV Movie
2019	Appurtenance	Nylon Case	Short film
2020	Jatana	Ninja Kat	Short film
2021	Invidious	Latundra	Short film
2021	Industry Innovators (the movie)	Herself	
2022	Lit A$$ B!tche$	Skylar	Short film
2022	The Wrong Parking Lot	Lux	Short film
2023	Décolleté	Gia	
2024	Tormented Teddy	Barbie	Short film
2024	Kora	Sway	Short film
2024	White Cobra Diamond Fox vs the Golden Eye	Tarjella/Diamond	
2024	Molly's Paper Doll Land	Molly	Short film
2025	Dream – INK	Carina Wells/Starlet	Short film
2025	Temps Figé	Lily	
2026	Hyped UP Bunnies	Mercedes	
2026	The Orion Call	Vinty	Short film
2026	Moon Between Worlds	Amara Vale	Short film
TBA	The Reynaldo Rey Story	Herself	Post-production

=== As TV director/writer/producer ===
Year	Title	Director	screenWriter	Producer	Notes
2021	Industry Innovators	Yes	Yes	Yes	8 episodes
2020–2023	Heavenly Conquerors	Yes	Yes	Yes	24 episodes

=== TV acting roles ===
Year	Title	Role	Notes
2009	American Idol	Herself	Episode: "Auditions: Phoenix"
2014	Copycat MTV	Herself/Contestant Alicia Keys	Episode: "Episode #1.2"
2021	Industry Innovators	Herself	2 episodes
2020–2023	Heavenly Conquerors	Pearl	24 episodes
2024	Pawn Stars Do America	Herself/Seller	Episode: "Phoenix Fortunes"
