= Pawn Stars Australia =

- Genre: Reality television
- Based on: Pawn Stars
- Directed by: Martin Baker
- Starring: Aaron Senes; Ben Senes; Shanon Folden
- Country of origin: Australia
- Original language: English
- No. of seasons: 1
- No. of episodes: 12

Production
- Production company: Leftfield Pictures

Original release
- Network: A&E
- Release: 21 July – 6 October 2015

Related
- Pawn Stars; Pawn Stars UK

Pawn Stars Australia was the Australian adaptation of the American series of the same name. It premiered on 21 July 2015 on A&E. The Australian version is the third international spin-off after Pawn Stars UK and Pawn Stars South Africa, and the seventh spin-off overall.

The series starred brothers Aaron and Ben Senes along with their childhood mate Shanon Folden, who own the well-known chain of pawn stores called Happy Hockers in Sydney.

The series was directed by Martin Baker and produced by Leftfield Pictures, the same company that produces the American original.

The complete first season DVD was scheduled to be released on 5 October 2016.

== Development and production ==
In August 2014, the series was officially commissioned, and Leftfield Pictures (the company behind Pawn Stars U.S.) were officially confirmed as the producers of the local adaptation. It was also stated that the series would air in 2015, rather than in 2014 as previously rumoured. In June 2015, it was announced the series would officially star brothers Aaron and Ben Senes and best friend Shanon Folden and would premiere on 21 July 2015.

The Senes brother said they agreed to do the reality series to help the public know about the pawn industry, which they said is misunderstood. "People can see it's a legitimate operation where we do everything by the book and we have a successful business to prove it", Ben Senes said. The brothers have been in the business for 22 years. Selling jewellery and electronics is the "bread-and-butter" of their business but people also bring in highly unusual items. Through the years they have seen everything from monkey testicles, to gold teeth fillings to rare collectibles such as a vintage red telephone box.

Although Happy Hockers operates 5 stores across Sydney, the series was filmed almost entirely at their Bondi Beach store.

== Episodes ==
No.	Title	Original release date	Aus. viewers (millions)
1	"If These Balls Could Talk"	21 July 2015	102,000
2	"Surf's Up"	28 July 2015	64,000
3	"Blue in the Face"	4 August 2015	66,000
4	"O'l Shaz of the Sea"	11 August 2015	47,000
5	"A Betting Man's Game"	18 August 2015	58,000
6	"Smokey and the Shaz"	25 August 2015	N/A
7	"Movie Night"	1 September 2015	N/A
8	"A Mess of Sh#t"	8 September 2015	N/A
9	"Who Jackman"	15 September 2015	N/A
10	"Run Shaz Run"	22 September 2015	N/A
11	"Ben's Whipped"	29 September 2015	N/A
12	"The Mutt of All Episodes"	6 October 2015	N/A
