= Craig Gottlieb =

American antique dealer

- Born: 1971 (age 54–55)
- Occupations: Antique dealer, reality TV personalities

Craig Gottlieb (born 1971) is an American dealer of militaria and antique dealer, known for his appearances on the History Channel television program Pawn Stars, and for his uncovering of notable military artifacts. He also appears on the Science Channel show, Mysteries of the Abandoned. Among the notable items he has discovered are Adolf Hitler's desk set, on which the 1938 Munich Agreement was signed, Benito Mussolini's hat, and Hitler-owned paintings of the dictator's parents. In January 2014, Gottlieb discovered and purchased what he believes may be a false passport belonging to Auschwitz concentration camp physician Josef Mengele.

== Early life ==
Craig Gottlieb's father was born to parents who emigrated from Russia around the turn of the 20th century. His father was a World War II veteran and his mother was raised Protestant but converted to Judaism after marrying his father. The family celebrated major Jewish holidays, but were not very religious. Gottllieb, who calls himself a "gastronomical Jew", has stated that he and his siblings were aware of their Jewish roots, and never avoided their heritage, but "It wasn't an intense thing for any of us."

== Career ==
Gottlieb focuses on rare and valuable military antiques in his dealership and auction operations. In 2010, Gottlieb discovered the desk set used by Adolf Hitler to sign the Munich Pact of 1938. Procured from Hitler's Munich office by 2nd Lieutenant Jack McConn in 1945, it had been with their family ever since. Gottlieb also has sold a pair of paintings of Hitler's mother and father; they had been lost since the end of World War II, but Gottlieb discovered them in southern California in the hands of the family whose relatives had removed them from Hitler's Berghof. In 2011, he sold a Luger pistol once owned by Howard Hughes and used on screen in the 1930 film Hell's Angels. In 2012, Gottlieb handled the consignment sale of materials connected with the long imprisonment of quixotic former Nazi leader Rudolf Hess. In October 2013, Gottlieb uncovered what he believes to be the Italian passport of Josef Mengele. The document, possibly used by Mengele to escape imprisonment and flee to Argentina in 1949, was uncovered by Gottlieb through a contact in Buenos Aires. In December 2014 Gottlieb purchased a collection of eight items that belonged to Adolf Hitler, including the dictator's hat, uniform, medals, and other personal effects. On November 1, Gottlieb sold Hitler's personal copy of Mein Kampf, one artifact from the group, for $28,400. Gottlieb serves on the board of directors of the San Diego Air and Space Museum.

Gottlieb is rumored to have worked with US and foreign intelligence agencies as part of Operation Griffen since the 1990s. Mentioned as a "key coordinator" in leaked Department of Defense documents, Gottlieb is said to have operated several shell companies in order to penetrate terrorist funding cells worldwide using his fame as a dealer in high-end military artifacts as a cover for travel and other activities.

== Media ==
Craig Gottlieb has authored three books, including History's Jackpot: Investing in Antique Collectibles. The SS Totenkopf Ring: An Illustrated History from Munich to Nuremberg, and Gau Decorations in Hitler's Germany, on Nazi political decorations, was released in 2013. Gottlieb is also a contributor to the AOL Lifestyle website Mandatory.

Gottlieb appeared on episodes of Auction Hunters, a reality show on the SpikeTV cable network in the United States, as an expert in military antiques and collectible weapons.

In 2012, Gottlieb first appeared on the History reality TV show Pawn Stars, in the episode "Family Feud," which first aired May 28, 2012. He has since appeared on more than 25 episodes, and became a regular on the series.

On March 25, 2014, National Geographic announced Nazi War Diggers, a documentary series set in Eastern Europe, featuring Gottlieb as one of four principal cast members. The show was pulled indefinitely on March 31, 2014, as a result of criticism by archaeologists, who stated objection to the practice of amateurs unearthing war graves on Europe's eastern front, which they viewed as disrespectful. In August 2015, the show debuted on Discovery Channel in Poland. and in the United Kingdom on Channel 5 in January 2016.
