= Brent Montgomery =

American businessman

- Education: Texas A&M University
- Occupations: Businessman, television producer, media executive
- Employer: Wheelhouse Entertainment

Brent Montgomery is an American businessman who is CEO of Wheelhouse Entertainment, a media group he launched in 2018. Under the Wheelhouse banner is Spoke Studios, the content arm of Wheelhouse Entertainment, which creates programming across a variety of platforms and genres.

Montgomery also is a strategic advisor to ITV America. Montgomery was named CEO of ITV America in 2015 following the 2014 acquisition of his company, Leftfield Entertainment, for $360 million by UK-based, multi-national media company ITV. Under Montgomery's leadership, in 2017 ITV America's revenue increased by 33%.

== Career ==
Montgomery began his television career working for Texas CBS affiliate KBTX, which subsequently paid for the majority of his tuition at Texas A&M. He later moved to New York and worked on The Bachelor, Wife Swap and Blind Date.

Montgomery started his first production company, Leftfield Pictures, in 2002 with $10,000. Leftfield Pictures initially shot wedding videos while developing its entertainment content and clientele, and eventually sold its first series, The Principal’s Office, in 2008. Montgomery developed the concept for Leftfield Pictures’ flagship series Pawn Stars while in Las Vegas for a bachelor party. Struck by the number of pawn shops in the city, Montgomery set out to locate a shop with the right setting and staff around which to build a television series. Ultimately, Montgomery negotiated a deal with Gold & Silver Pawn Shop co-owner Rick Harrison, and pitched the show to the History Channel. In 2009, Pawn Stars premiered on History as a top rated series for the network, highlighting the “hidden treasures” genre of programming.

Montgomery grew Leftfield Pictures rapidly with other series soon added to Leftfield's roster. In addition to Pawn Stars, other Leftfield Pictures series and Montgomery credits include Alone, American Restoration and Counting Cars for History; American Grit for Fox; Bethenny & Fredrik for Bravo, and National Geographic Channel’s specials Billy the Kid: The New Evidence (executive produced by Kevin Costner) and Brain Surgery Live.

In 2013, Montgomery established parent company Leftfield Entertainment (LFE), and assumed the role of CEO, in conjunction with acquiring production company Sirens Media. He then launched additional production companies under the LFE umbrella – Loud TV and Outpost Entertainment – before selling 80% of the company for $360 million to ITV in 2014. At the end of 2015, Montgomery completed a deal through which ITV acquired all of the Leftfield Entertainment group. As part of that process, he became CEO of newly formed production group ITV America, encompassing original Leftfield Entertainment companies Leftfield Pictures, Sirens Media, Outpost Entertainment, Loud TV; plus ITV Entertainment, Gurney Productions, High Noon Entertainment and Thinkfactory Media. Collectively, they produce series including FOX's The Four: Battle for Stardom and Hell’s Kitchen; HGTV's Fixer Upper, Netflix's Queer Eye and Girls Incarcerated, A&E's Duck Dynasty and The First 48, History's Pawn Stars, Alone and Forged in Fire. Bravo's The Real Housewives of New Jersey,

During Montgomery's tenure as CEO of ITV America, the company made production and talent deals with TV personalities and celebrities Michael Strahan, WWE star John Cena, Bethenny Frankel, Good Morning America co-host Lara Spencer, Grammy award-winner Timbaland and author/actress La La Anthony.

In January 2018, Montgomery founded Wheelhouse Entertainment and its production company Spoke Studios. He is CEO of Wheelhouse Entertainment.

== Honors and affiliations ==
Montgomery was featured on the cover of The Hollywood Reporter on January 30, 2019, focusing on his new business, the Wheelhouse Group, and highlighting his contributions to reality TV.

In June 2016, Montgomery was inducted into the Realscreen Hall of Fame as Producer Extraordinaire.

In 2014 Montgomery became a founding member of the Non-Fiction Producers Association (NPA), the first professional body created for the non-fiction TV business in the US, and is on its executive committee. In 2017 the NPA merged with PactUS to create NPACT, on whose board and executive committee Montgomery also sits. In 2018, he received NPACT's “Inspiration Award for Outstanding Achievement In Nonfiction” as part of the organization's inaugural NPACT Impact Awards.

Montgomery is a member of Lincoln Center Corporate Fund's newly launched Media and Entertainment Council, and a member of the Paley Media Council.
