= Lexington Senior High School (North Carolina) =

American public school in North Carolina

Location
- 26 Penry Street; Lexington, North Carolina 27292; United States; 35°50′00″N 80°14′55″W

Information
- Type: Public
- Motto: Be Somebody
- Established: 1953
- School district: Lexington City Schools
- CEEB code: 342275
- Principal: Jermaine Porter
- Staff: 52.50 (FTE)
- Grades: 9–12
- Enrollment: 929 (2023-2024)
- Student to teacher ratio: 17.70
- Colors: Blue, Orange, White
- Athletics conference: 4A; PAC Seven Conference
- Mascot: Yellow Jackets
- Website: www.lexcs.org/o/lshs

Lexington Senior High School is a public high school in Lexington, North Carolina. It was established in March 1953.

== Administration ==
- Principal: Jermaine Porter
- Assistant principals: Marc Houlihan, Rodrick Pitt, Cynthia Mosley

== Feeder schools ==
- Charles England Elementary
- Pickett Elementary
- South Lexington Elementary
- Southwest Elementary
- Lexington Middle

== Demographics ==
In 2011, using federal government guidelines, 69% of the students were eligible for free or reduced-price lunches.

== Spending ==
The Lexington City Schools spends $8,631 per pupil based on 2011 expenditures. The district spends 62% on instruction, 32% on support services, 6% on other elementary and secondary expenditures.

== Athletics ==
Lexington is a member of the North Carolina High School Athletic Association (NCHSAA) and are classified as a 4A school. They are members of the 4A/5A PAC Seven Conference. The school mascot is the Yellow Jacket.

=== Sporting Accomplishments ===
- NCHSAA State 2A Football Champions: 1985, 1986
- NCHSAA State 2A Basketball Champions: 1988, 1995
- NCHSAA State 1A/2A Men's Tennis Team Champions: 1986, 1987
- NCHSAA State Men's Tennis Doubles Champions: 1925
- NCHSAA State 1A/2A Men's Tennis Doubles Champions: 1987
- NCHSAA State 2A Men's Tennis Doubles Champions: 2001
- NCHSAA State 3A Men's Tennis Doubles Champions: 1993
- NCHSAA State Women's 4x100 Relay Champions: 1986, 1987, 1989, 2019, 2021
- NCHSAA State Women's 4x200 Relay Champions: 1989, 1991, 2021
- NCHSAA State Men's 4x100 Relay Champions: 2000, 2001, 2002
- NCHSAA State Men's 4x200 Relay Champions: 1989, 2001

== Notable alumni ==
- Bill Bailey, former NFL player
- Richard Benjamin Harrison Jr., businessman and reality television personality, best known as co-owner of the World Famous Gold & Silver Pawn Shop as featured on Pawn Stars
- Deems May, former NFL tight end
- Joe McIntosh, former NFL running back
- Harvey Cloyd Philpott, businessman and politician
- David Rice, 15th Anglican Bishop of Waiapu
- John Skipper, television executive, former president of ESPN, former executive chairman of DAZAN Group, and co-founder of Meadowlark Media.
- William Caskey Swaim, television and film actor
- Carlos Terry, NBA player
- Rick Terry, former NFL defensive tackle
