= Rick Terry =

American football player (born 1974)

No. 94, 71
- Position: Defensive tackle

Personal information
- Born: April 5, 1974 (age 52); Lexington, North Carolina, U.S.
- Listed height: 6 ft 4 in (1.93 m)
- Listed weight: 302 lb (137 kg)

Career information
- High school: Lexington (NC)
- College: North Carolina
- NFL draft: 1997: 2nd round, 31st overall pick

Career history
- New York Jets (1997–1998); Carolina Panthers (1998-1999)

Awards and highlights
- Second-team All-ACC (1996)

Career NFL statistics
- Tackles: 38
- Sacks: 4
- Stats at Pro Football Reference

Richard Ross Terry Jr. (born April 5, 1974) is an American former professional football player who was a defensive tackle in the National Football League (NFL). He played from 1997 to 1999 for the New York Jets and the Carolina Panthers. He played college football for the North Carolina Tar Heels and was selected by the Jets in the second round of the 1997 NFL draft.
