= Joe McIntosh (American football) =

American football player (born 1962)

No. 48
- Position: Running back

Personal information
- Born: December 9, 1962 (age 63); Lexington, North Carolina, U.S.
- Listed height: 5 ft 10 in (1.78 m)
- Listed weight: 192 lb (87 kg)

Career information
- High school: Lexington (NC)
- College: NC State (1981–1984)
- NFL draft: 1985: 5th round, 118th overall pick

Career history
- Detroit Lions (1985)*; San Francisco 49ers (1986)*; Atlanta Falcons (1987)
- * Offseason or practice squad member only

Awards and highlights
- ACC Rookie of the Year (1981); First-team All-ACC (1981)

Career NFL statistics
- Rushing yards: 11
- Rushing average: 2.2
- Receptions: 3
- Receiving yards: 15
- Touchdowns: 1
- Stats at Pro Football Reference

Joseph Ellison McIntosh (born December 9, 1962) is an American former professional football player who was a running back for one season with the Atlanta Falcons of the National Football League (NFL). He was selected by the Detroit Lions in the fifth round of the 1985 NFL draft after playing college football for the NC State Wolfpack.

== Early life ==
Joseph Ellison McIntosh was born on December 9, 1962, in Lexington, North Carolina. He attended Lexington Senior High School in Lexington.

== College career ==
McIntosh was a four-year letterman for the Wolfpack at North Carolina State University from 1981 to 1984. He rushed 222 times for 1,190 yards and five touchdowns as a freshman in 1981, earning ACC Rookie of the Year and first-team All-ACC honors. He led the ACC in carries and rushing yards that season. He also caught 11 passes for 97 yards and completed one of three passes for seven yards, one touchdown, and one interception. McIntosh recorded 183 rushing attempts for 780 yards and six touchdowns, and 12 receptions for 91 yards in 1982. In 1983, he totaled 217 carries for 1,081 yards and five touchdowns, and 21 catches for 215 yards. He led the ACC in carries that season. McIntosh rushed 107 times for 591 yards and four touchdowns as a senior in 1984.

== Professional career ==
McIntosh was selected by the Detroit Lions in the fifth round, with the 118th overall pick, of the 1985 NFL draft. He officially signed with the team on July 21. He was released on August 27, 1985.

McIntosh signed with the San Francisco 49ers on January 9, 1986, but was later released on July 23, 1986.

On September 23, 1987, McIntosh signed with the Atlanta Falcons during the 1987 NFL players strike. He played in two games for the Falcons, rushing five times for 11 yards, catching three passes for 15 yards and one touchdown, and returning three kicks for 108 yards. He was released on October 19, 1987, after the strike ended.
