= Pawn Stars UK =

- Promotional banner image for the first season. The cast from left to right: Victoria Manning, Mark Lever Holland, Mark Andrew Manning, Mark Peter Holland, and Simon Penworth.
- Directed by: Rennik Soholt
- Starring: Mark Andrew Manning (season 1–season 2); Mark Lever Holland (season 1–season 2); Mark Peter Holland (season 1); Simon Penworth (season 1–season 2); Victoria Manning (season 1–season 2); Liam "The New Kid" (season 2)
- Country of origin: United Kingdom
- Original language: English
- No. of seasons: 2
- No. of episodes: 24

Production
- Production locations: Chester, UK
- Production company: Leftfield Pictures

Original release
- Network: History (UK)
- Release: 26 August 2013 – 10 November 2014

Related
- Pawn Stars; American Restoration; Cajun Pawn Stars; Counting Cars

Pawn Stars UK is a British reality television series which debuted on 26 August 2013 on the British version of the History channel and ran until 10 November 2014. The series was filmed in Sealand, Flintshire in Wales, and chronicled the day-to-day activities of pawn shop Regal Pawn, collaboratively run by Mark Andrew Manning, Mark Lever Holland, Marco Peter Holland, Simon Penworth, and Vicki Manning.

A spin-off of the prominent American reality television series Pawn Stars (2009–present), the show's format was similar to the latter show, as it featured an array of collectible, antique and unusual items that people sell or pawn. In 2015, the Regal Pawn store where the show was set went bankrupt. It permanently closed its doors and a request was made to "strike off" the company at Companies House. The last time the premises were mentioned online, it was available for purchase through local estate agents.

== Production history and format ==
Following the success of Pawn Stars, Leftfield Pictures decided to produce a few spin-offs of it. Pawn Stars UK is the first international spin-off of Pawn Stars and the fourth spin-off overall.

The development of Pawn Stars UK was announced in October 2012, after A&E Networks and A&E Networks UK jointly agreed on a British edition of Pawn Stars. Executive producer Brent Montgomery opined that it would be "a natural extension of the [Pawn Stars] brand". Casting was completed in the same month, and production commenced in the final quarter of 2012. Pawn Stars UK debuted in the UK on 26 August 2013.

The show had a format in the style of Pawn Stars. It followed the daily operations of Regal Pawn, where the show was shot on location. Customers were mostly shown selling or pawning "amazing historically significant items". Deals and other interactions with customers in the show were handled by the main shop staff. At times when the cast were uncertain about a certain item's authenticity or value, on-screen experts were called on to appraise the item. As of September 2013, two experts had been featured on the show – Robert "The Robster" Fiddaman, a music enthusiast, and Stewart Knight "Midge" Myzylowskyj, a gun expert.

== Cast ==
- Mark Andrew "Big Mark" Manning – Born and raised in Norton Canes, Staffordshire, Manning "worked in a crematorium, [...] sold double glazing and worked for solicitors", among others, prior to establishing Regal Pawn. He is married with seven children and four grandchildren.
- Mark Lever "Little Mark" Holland – Manning's best friend. Born in Wallasey and raised in South Africa, Holland enjoyed a short stint at the army and joined Regal Pawn once it was established.
- Mark Peter "Marco" Holland – Born 17 September 1990, he is Holland's son. The younger Holland was born in Wales. He used to work as a trainee chef before joining Regal Pawn. Marco was the shop's expert in firearms and deactivated weapons.
- Vicki Manning – Born in Cannock, Vicki was Mark Manning's daughter (2nd) and she served as shop manager at Regal Pawn. Prior to that she did various jobs, including managing a fish pedicure outlet and manufacturing computers. She was single with one son. Metro described her in September 2013 as "Pawn Star UK's Golden Girl". In 2021, she died from cancer.
- Simon "Ebeneezer" Penworth – One of Regal Pawn's staff who specialises in militaria and auction house selling. He used to be a high-up figure in a well-known high street chain before semi-retiring and joining the gang for valuations and road shows.
- Liam "The New Kid" – 16-year-old Liam joined the cast for season 2 after he was hired to work at the shop while he was looking for a job there. He is very enthusiastic about history and sports and is always trying to learn more about the business.
