= Chumlee =

American television personality (born 1982)

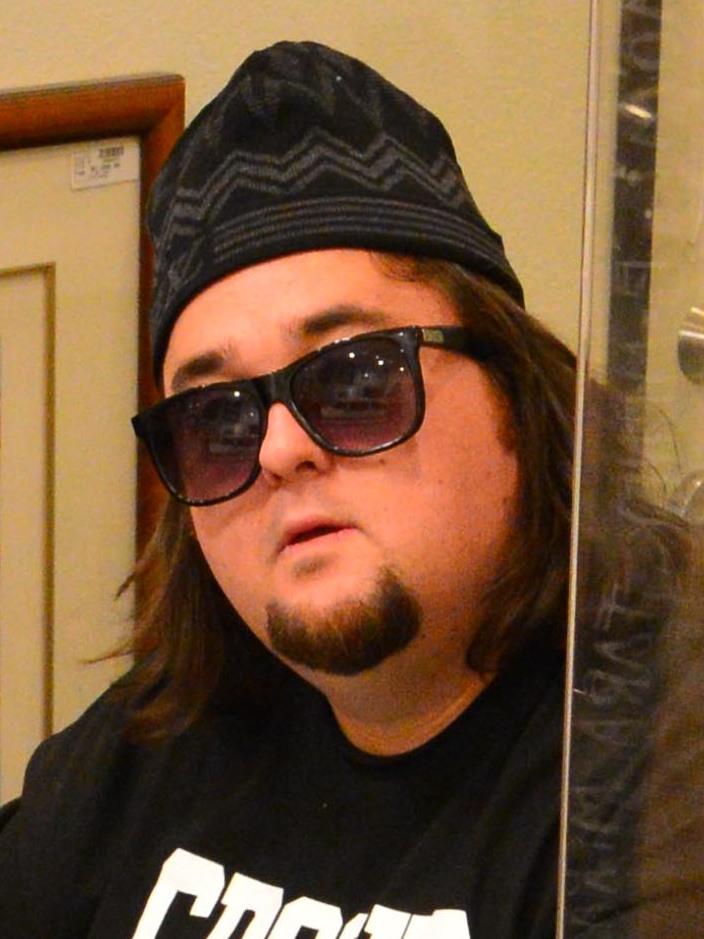
- Chumlee in 2012
- Born: Austin Lee Russell; September 8, 1982 (age 44); Henderson, Nevada, U.S.
- Occupations: Businessman; television personality
- Years active: 2003–present

Austin Lee Russell (born September 8, 1982), better known by his nickname “Chumlee”, is an American businessman and reality television personality, best known for his appearances on the History Channel television show Pawn Stars, which depicts day-to-day business at the Gold and Silver Pawn Shop in Las Vegas where he works. Chumlee went to work at the pawn shop five years before filming the first season, having been a childhood friend of Corey Harrison whose father and grandfather founded the shop.

Chumlee is often portrayed on the show as the comic foil, but he often appraises items in his areas of expertise, including pinball machines, sports memorabilia, sneakers, toys, and video games.

== Early life ==
Russell was born on September 8, 1982, in Henderson, Nevada. When he was about 12 years old, he was given the nickname "Chumlee" due to his large face and chin, which prompted the father of one of his friends to remark that he looked like Chumley, the walrus from the animated TV series Tennessee Tuxedo.

As a child, he became good friends with Corey Harrison, whose father, Rick Harrison, and grandfather, Richard Harrison, opened the Gold & Silver Pawn Shop in 1989.

== Career ==
Chumlee began working for the Gold & Silver Pawn Shop at age 21. He worked there for five years before filming the first season of the reality television series Pawn Stars in July 2009. His duties include behind-the-counter work at the shop, such as testing items, loading items, and writing tickets for items purchased by customers.

In the series, he is depicted as the comic foil, often made the butt of the others' jokes for his perceived lack of intelligence and his incompetence, for which he has been referred to as a "village idiot". Chumlee has responded by explaining that he is underestimated and points to his expertise in pinball machines, which he utilizes in the second-season episode "Pinball Wizards", much to Corey's surprise, as an example of an area in which he is knowledgeable.

Chumlee emerged as the breakout cast member, and a fan favorite of the series. As a result of the show's success, he formed his own company selling novelty items of his own design and arranged his personal appearances. He sold half of his stake in the company in 2010 to Rick Harrison for $155,000, so that the shop could handle orders of his merchandise more efficiently. Chumlee's sales of merchandise have surpassed other stars of the show due to his popularity.

Chumlee appeared as himself, alongside Rick and Corey Harrison, in the episode "iLost My Head in Vegas", on the American TV series iCarly.

In May 2017, Chumlee opened a candy shop, Chumlee's Candy on the Boulevard, across the street from the Gold and Silver Pawn Shop in Las Vegas.

In 2020 Chumlee released a NES style video game titled Chumlee's Adventure: The Quest for Pinky, a homebrew action game for the Nintendo Entertainment System developed by Cayhan Games. The game features Chumlee fighting his way through the pawn shop and its customers to find his dog, Pinky, in a style reminiscent of the classic NES title Kung Fu.

In 2022 Chumlee, alongside Corey and Rick, starred in a spinoff of Pawn Stars, Pawn Stars Do America where the trio travel across the United States buying items from fans.

In 2025 he alongside Rick, started the Pawn Stars After Dark Podcast where they discuss behind-the-scenes stories from the Pawn Shop, along with Pawn Stars castmates, and various guests.

== Personal life ==
Chumlee enjoys collecting shoes, owning more than 200 pairs. He also enjoys sports, the Pokémon Trading Card Game, video games, and skateboarding. He is a fan of both punk rock and rap music. He is a fan of the TV series Boardwalk Empire, Sons of Anarchy, and Breaking Bad. He enjoys driving his 1986 Buick Regal, which he has customized with hydraulic lifts on the front and back. As of 2013, he owned a collection of cars which included a Rolls-Royce Phantom, Maserati GranTurismo, Cadillac Escalade, Range Rover, and a 1964 Impala SS.

In March 2010, Chumlee along with the other Pawn Stars were awarded the key to the city of Las Vegas by Mayor Oscar Goodman. The group also served as grand marshals for the History 300 NASCAR race at the Charlotte Motor Speedway on May 26, 2012.

By September 2013, Chumlee had altered his lifestyle habits and lost 75 lb (34 kg) in a year by exercising at a gym six days a week and improving his diet, including drinking more juice, eating more vegetables and abstaining from red meat, a change that was inspired by his father's death at age 54 from pancreatic cancer, two weeks before Pawn Stars debuted. Chumlee's diet has enabled him to be able to ride a hovercraft he had purchased earlier in the series, which had a maximum weight restriction of 250 lb (110 kg). He later regained the weight, weighing as much as 350 lb (160 kg) in January 2019. He had gastric sleeve surgery, leading to him losing 160 lb (73 kg) by October 2021.

== Legal issues ==
On March 9, 2016, Chumlee's home was raided during the course of an investigation into sexual assault allegations. During searches of his residence, police found crystal meth, marijuana, Xanax, and multiple firearms. Evidence of possible cocaine use was also found. Chumlee was arrested but released on bond the following day, and scheduled to appear in court days later.

On May 23, 2016, Chumlee was charged with 20 felony counts, including drug and weapons charges. David Chesnoff, his lawyer, confirmed that Russell had pleaded guilty to a felony weapons charge of unlawful possession of a firearm and a gross misdemeanor of attempted drug possession in a deal that calls for three years of probation and counseling.
