= Richard Benjamin Harrison =

American pawnbroker and television personality (1941–2018)

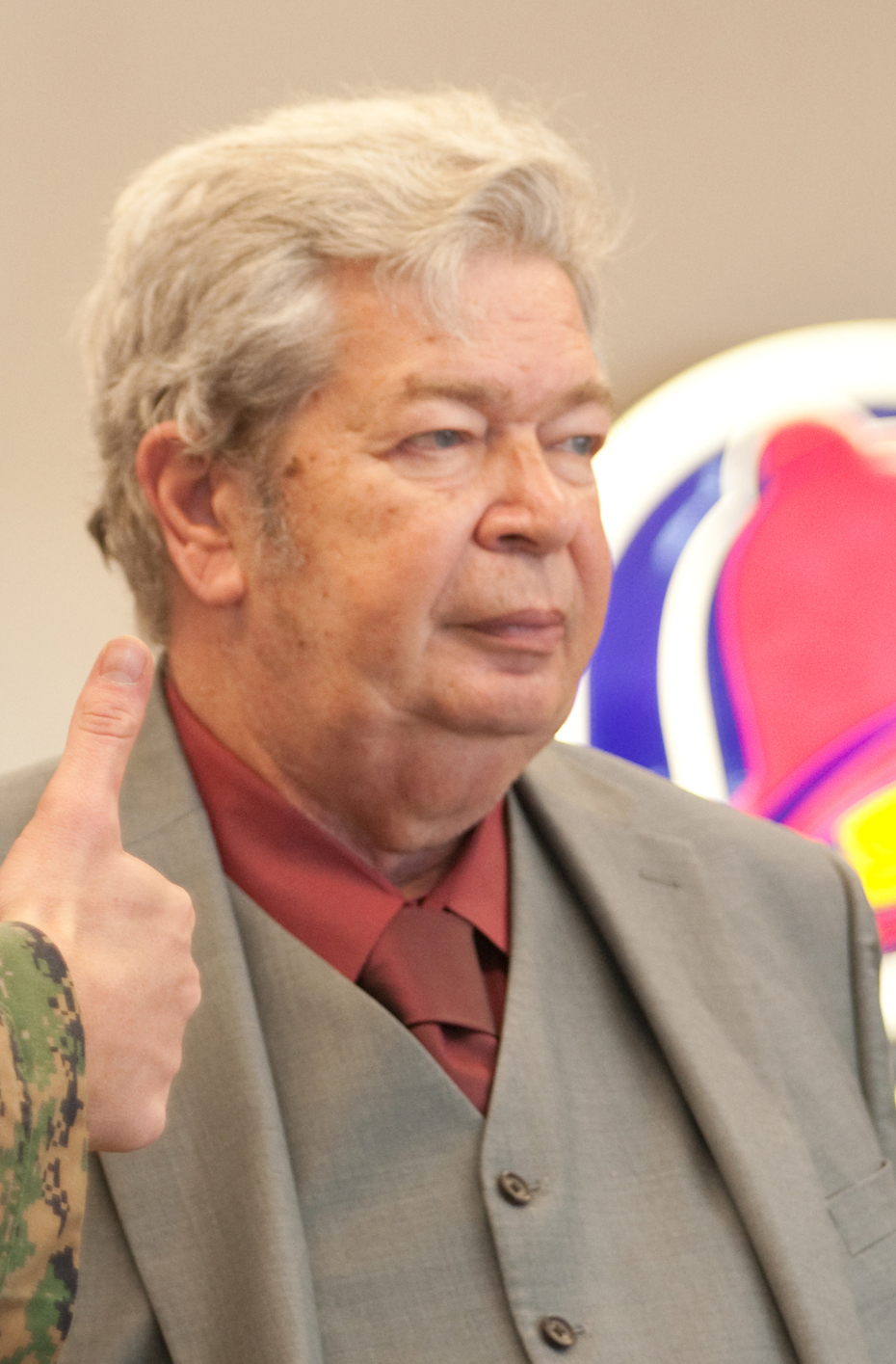
- Harrison in 2010
- Born: March 4, 1941; Danville, Virginia, U.S.
- Died: June 25, 2018 (aged 77); Las Vegas, Nevada, U.S.
- Other names: The Old Man (nickname); The Appraiser; Benny
- Occupations: Businessman; reality television personality
- Years active: 1981–2018
- Spouse: Joanne Rhue (m. 1960)
- Children: 4, including Rick Harrison
- Website: gspawn.com
- Military career
- Allegiance: United States
- Branch: United States Navy
- Service years: 1958–1979
- Rank: Petty officer first class

Richard Benjamin Harrison Jr. (March 4, 1941 – June 25, 2018), also known by the nicknames "The Old Man" and "The Appraiser", was an American businessman and reality television personality, best known as the co-owner of the Gold & Silver Pawn Shop, as featured on the History Channel series Pawn Stars. Harrison was the co-owner of the pawn shop with his son Rick Harrison. They opened the store together in 1989.

== Early life ==
Richard Benjamin Harrison Jr. was born in Danville, Virginia, on March 4, 1941, and was of Irish descent. Harrison's grandson, Corey, has mentioned his grandmother said they are related to Presidents William Henry Harrison and Benjamin Harrison. Harrison indicated that he did not give much credence to this idea.

When Harrison was one year old, his family moved to Lexington, North Carolina, where they lived at 115 Peacock Avenue, just off South Main Street. Harrison attended Lexington High School, but left during his junior year (age 16-17). Harrison's family was poor, and to make money, Harrison drove a school bus when he was 14, parking the bus at his house every night, and getting up early in the morning to pick up the schoolchildren, for which he was paid five or six dollars a week.

== Marriage and the Navy ==
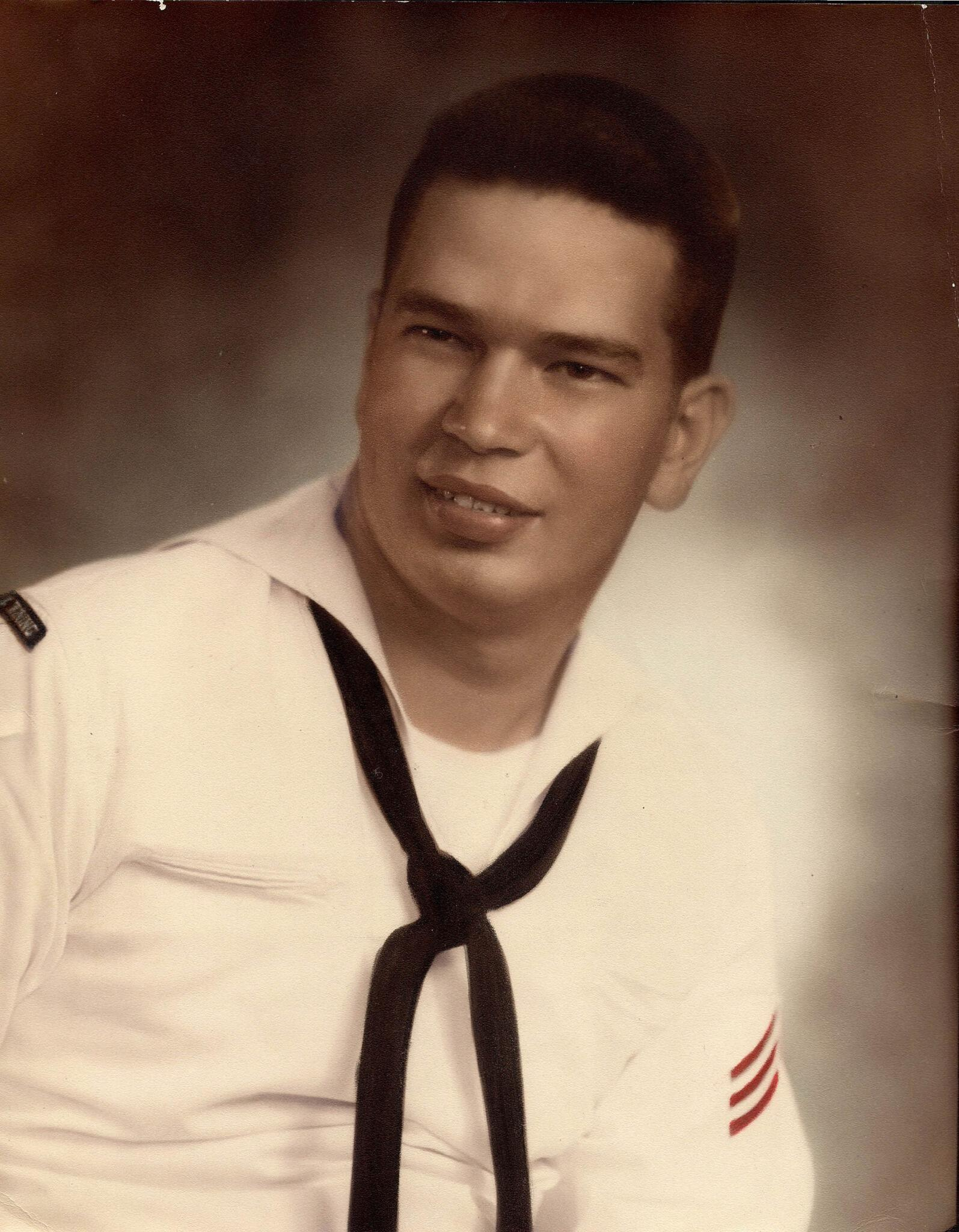
Navy portrait of Harrison, c. 1958–1979

When he was 17, Harrison attended a barn dance, where he met his future wife, Joanne Rhue, the daughter of Joseph Rhue, a county judge, who later became one of the lead attorneys for Philip Morris in North Carolina. They married in 1960. Before they married, however, Harrison stole a car, and after he was arrested, was given a choice by the judge to go to prison or the military. Harrison chose the latter, entering the United States Navy in October 1958.

Joanne became pregnant soon after the wedding. Their first child was daughter Sherry, who was born with Down syndrome. They also had three sons, Joseph, Rick, and Chris. Harrison left the Navy in February 1962, but re-enlisted fourteen months later in order to obtain the health care benefits necessary to meet Sherry's medical expenses. She died when she was six years old.

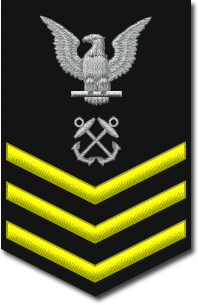
Harrison achieved the rate of petty officer first class while serving in the United States Navy.

Harrison ultimately served in the U.S. Navy for 20 years, including stints as a paymaster, and attaining the rate of personnelman first class (PN1). Harrison served on four ships, including his final five years on fleet tug USS Chowanoc (ATF-100), from 1972 to 1976.

In 1967, Harrison was transferred by the Navy to San Diego, California. He continued to serve in the Navy, while Joanne obtained her real estate license in 1970 and opened her own office in 1973. After Harrison was discharged from the Navy in 1979, he worked part-time in his wife's office. Declining real estate sales caused by interest rates as high as 18 percent cost Harrison $1,000,000 and the collapse of this business in 1981.

== Business career ==
In April 1981, Harrison and his wife, having only $5,000 left, moved with their three sons to Las Vegas, Nevada, where Harrison and his son Rick opened Gold & Silver Coin Shop in a 300-square-foot (28 m^{2}) shop at 1501 Las Vegas Boulevard. Five years later, the family relocated the business to a larger building at 413 Fremont Street, where it remained for two years before the Harrisons lost their lease. In 1987, the Harrisons obtained a license to buy and sell secondhand goods. Harrison's son Rick relates in his autobiography that he and his father had long-sought to convert the store into a pawn shop, but a 1955 Las Vegas law limiting pawn licenses to one per every 50,000 residents precluded this. By 1988 the city's population of over 200,000 was rapidly growing, so Harrison called the city statistician periodically to monitor the population. By 1989 the city's population reached 250,000, and after some legal struggles, the Harrisons obtained their pawn license. That year Harrison and his father opened the Gold & Silver Pawn Shop at 713 Las Vegas Boulevard South, less than two miles from the Las Vegas Strip. By 2005, Harrison and his father were loaning out about $3 million annually, which brought them about $700,000 in interest income.

The most common item brought into the store is jewelry. As of July 2011, the store had 12,000 items in its inventory, 5,000 of which are typically held on pawn. Even when absent from the show, according to an episode of Pawn Stars, Harrison usually was the first to arrive at the shop in the morning, and by 2010, had not had a sick day since 1994.

By 2006, the shop had developed a reputation for carrying special sports items with unique histories, including a 2001 New England Patriots Super Bowl ring that belonged to American football cornerback Brock Williams. It also served gamblers who, according to Harrison's son Corey, often came in to "pawn something so they have gas to get back home."

From July 19, 2009, until his death, Harrison, his son Rick, his grandson Corey, and Corey's friend and employee Austin Russell ("Chumlee") starred in the reality television program Pawn Stars on the History Channel. Harrison was depicted as saying little and easily angered. Chumlee has stated that he is old and cranky, while Harrison himself indicates: "My role on the show is to be an old grump." Within ten weeks of its debut, Pawn Stars was the highest-rated program on the History Channel, and second highest-rated reality show program behind Jersey Shore. In that same period, the average number of customers in the Gold & Silver Pawn Shop increased from 70 to 700 per day. By February 2012, between 3,000 and 5,000 people visited the store each day.

== Awards and recognition ==
In March 2010, Harrison, his son, grandson and Austin "Chumlee" Russell were awarded the key to the city of Las Vegas by Mayor Oscar Goodman.

Harrison and the other stars of Pawn Stars served as grand marshals for the History 300 NASCAR race at the Charlotte Motor Speedway on May 26, 2012.

On May 29, 2012, Harrison was awarded a key to the city of Lexington, his hometown, by Lexington Mayor Clark Newell, in the Lexington City Council Chamber, and the day was also officially "Richard Harrison's Day".

On July 17, 2012, the Clark County Commission declared that day to be "Pawn Stars/Gold & Silver Pawn Day". At the Commission meeting, Harrison donated $1000 to the Clark County Museum, and lent the U.S. Senate floor chair used by Senator Patrick McCarran (sold to the Gold and Silver in the Pawn Stars episode, "Take a Seat") to the museum as part of a display on Senator McCarran.

Harrison and his son Rick were nominated for the 2012 Time 100 list.

== Other appearances ==
On December 5, 2011, Harrison made a special appearance at the American Country Awards 2011, giving a speech on stage.

On February 25, 2012, he was a guest star at a Celebrity Bingo Bow Wow charity event, which was held at the Silverton Casino Lodge.

=== Daniel Callahan ===
In May 2012, Daniel Callahan filed a lawsuit in the District Court in Las Vegas claiming that Harrison and his son Rick failed to provide "reasonable and necessary" security at their store, seeking around $20,000 for injuries he allegedly suffered from being "dragged out of the pawn shop and tossed onto the sidewalk" after an argument over a rifle he had brought. Harrison's grandson, Corey, defended them both, stating that they were never in direct contact with Callahan and "it was in our best interests to get him out of there."

=== Interference with business practices ===
In October 2012, A&E Network and the History Channel, along with Harrison and the rest of the show's cast, were sued in Clark County District Court in Las Vegas for interference with business practices by Wayne F. Jefferies, a Las Vegas promoter and the Harrisons' manager, who represented them and "Chumlee" Russell in their television business dealings. Jefferies, who managed and operated the Las Vegas world cuisine restaurant Seven in 2001, and who, as an event promoter, put up to $75,000 in support of the 2005 and 2006 Las Vegas Red, White and Boom Independence Day event, was instrumental in helping to launch the series. Jefferies stated that after the show premiered, his influence in the show was increasingly reduced, and that he was ultimately fired and left without his promised share of fees and merchandising royalties from the series. According to Jefferies, this followed a January 2012 report on TMZ that indicated that the Pawn Stars cast objected to the History Channel's launch of the spinoff Cajun Pawn Stars, of which they had been unaware.

== Personal life ==
Harrison was particularly passionate about automobiles. Cars he owned or expressed an interest in on the television series include his 1966 Imperial Crown, which took him fifteen years to convince the previous owner to sell, and was subsequently restored by his son and grandson for his 50th wedding anniversary; a 1957 Chevy 150 sedan given to him by the stars of three other History Channel shows, American Restoration, Counting Cars and American Pickers; and the mid-1960s B&Z Electra-King electric car shown to them in Pawn Stars, which he suggested could be converted into a golf cart.

Harrison was usually referred to by his nickname, "The Old Man", which he earned at the age of 38.

== Death ==
Harrison died on June 25, 2018, as a result of Parkinson's disease. Harrison was survived by wife Joanne, three sons, 10 grandchildren and five great-grandchildren. Harrison placed his son Rick in charge of his estate. Christopher Keith Harrison, the youngest of Harrison's three sons, was intentionally omitted as a beneficiary in his father's will. Two days after his death, Pawn Stars aired a commemorative episode, "A Treasure Remembered", featuring clips from the show and interviews about him.
