= Rick Harrison =

American businessman and TV personality (born 1965)

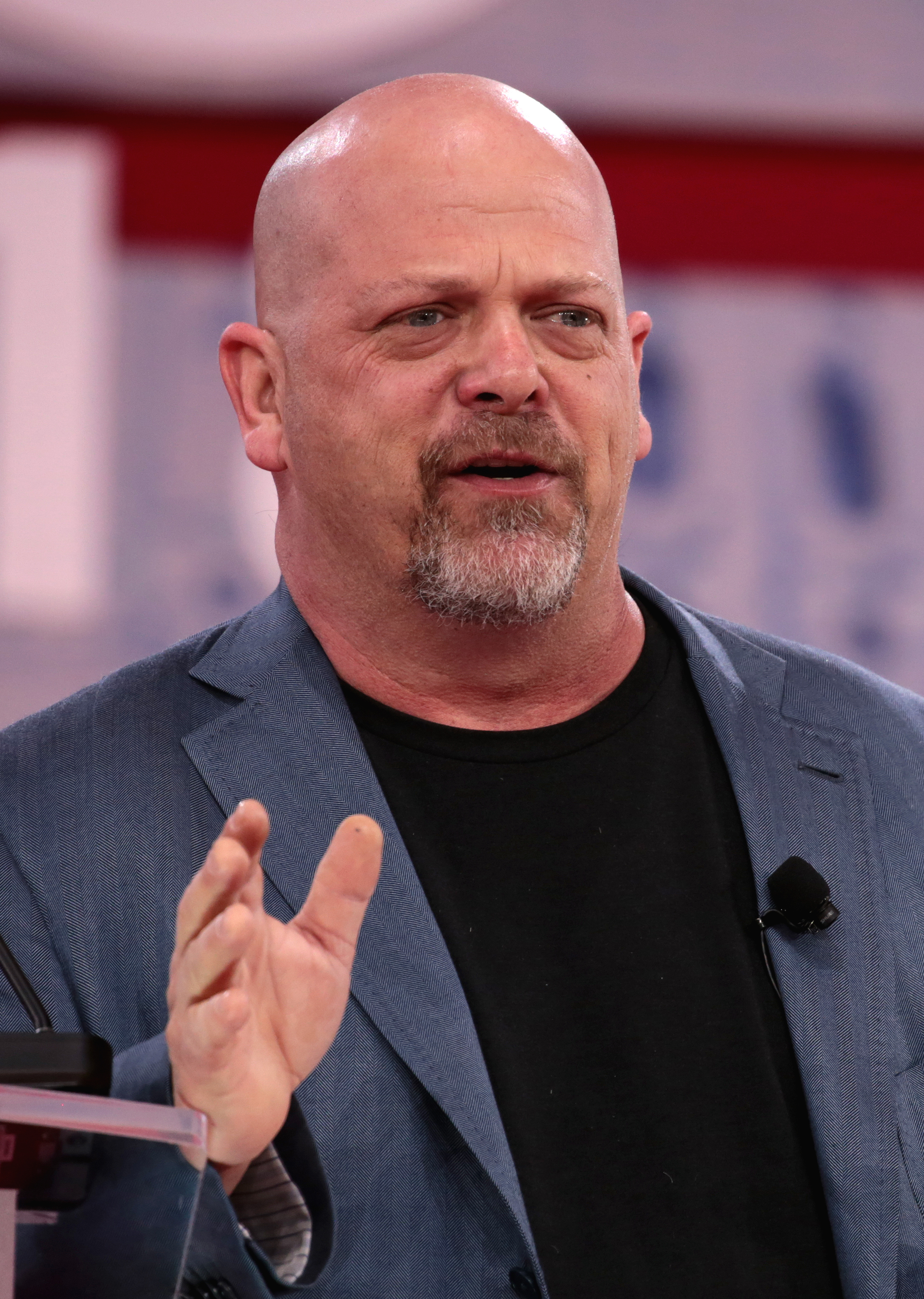
- Harrison in 2018
- Born: Richard Kevin Harrison; March 22, 1965 (age 61); Lexington, North Carolina, U.S.
- Occupations: Businessman; reality television personality
- Years active: 1983–present
- Known for: Pawn Stars; Pawnography; Pawn Stars Do America
- Political party: Republican
- Spouses: Kim Harrison (m. 1982; div. 1985) Tracy Harrison (m. 1986; div. 2011) DeAnna Burditt (m. 2013; div. 2020) Amanda Palmer (m. 2021; div. 2023) Angie Polushkin (m. 2026)
- Children: 3, including Corey
- Parents: Richard Benjamin Harrison (father); Joanne Rhue Harrison (mother)
- Harrison's voice Harrison on the economic policy of the second Trump administration. Recorded May 4, 2026
- Website: gspawn.com

Richard Kevin Harrison (born March 22, 1965) is an American businessman, reality television personality, and owner of the Gold & Silver Pawn Shop which is featured on the History series Pawn Stars. Harrison and his father, Richard Benjamin Harrison, opened the shop in 1989, which they co-owned until his father's death in 2018.

== Early life ==
Rick Harrison was born on March 22, 1965, in Lexington, North Carolina, the son of Richard Benjamin Harrison Jr who is of Irish descent., a U.S. Navy veteran, and Joanne Rhue Harrison. Harrison is the younger brother of Sherry Joanne Harrison (died at age 6), and Joseph Kent Harrison, and the older brother of Chris Harrison. According to Harrison's son Corey, his grandfather stated that they are related to U.S. President William Henry Harrison. Harrison has indicated that he does not give much credence to this idea, although Harrison's father stated the family is distantly related to President Benjamin Harrison, a grandson of William Henry Harrison.

In 1967, when Harrison was two years old, his father was transferred to San Diego, California, where the family relocated. As a child, Harrison began having epileptic seizures at age eight. As a result, he spent much of his time in bed which led to a lifelong love of books and reading in general. He became particularly enamored of a series of books by John D. Fitzgerald called The Great Brain, whose main character, a ten-year-old Utah con artist named Tom D. Fitzgerald with the ability to conjure up money-making schemes, greatly influenced Harrison.

Harrison was also fascinated with physics and history, his favorite area of historical study being the Royal Navy from the late 1700s to the early 1800s. Harrison attended Taft Middle School, which was part of the San Diego Unified School District. He then started attending Lexington Senior High School but dropped out during tenth grade to pursue his "$2,000-a-week business of selling fake Gucci bags".

The Harrison family relocated to Las Vegas, Nevada, in April 1981 after the collapse of his parents' real estate business. When Harrison was 17, his girlfriend Kim became pregnant. Despite a subsequent miscarriage, the couple decided to marry. Their first child, Corey, was born on April 27, 1983. Within two years, their second child, Adam, was born. Soon after Adam's birth, Harrison and Kim separated. Nine months later Harrison met the woman who would become his second wife, Tracy, on a blind double date. After dating for six months they moved in together, and eight months after this they married, and assumed the responsibility of raising Corey and Adam.

== Career ==
=== Businessman ===
In 1981 Harrison's father opened his first 300-square-foot secondhand store, the Gold & Silver Coin Shop, on Las Vegas Boulevard South. Harrison worked for his father in the store in the daytime while repossessing cars at night. After five years the store moved to a larger location on Fremont Street. After two years at that location the Harrisons lost their lease. They subsequently moved into a new building in a commercial neighborhood on Las Vegas Boulevard. Harrison relates in his autobiography that he and his father had long-sought to convert the store into a pawn shop, calling it a "logical progression." Because of a 1955 Las Vegas law requiring the issuing of new pawn licenses to be limited on the basis of the city's population, which by 1988 was over 200,000 and rapidly growing, Harrison called the city statistician every week, so that they could apply for a rare and much-coveted pawn license as soon as the city's population reached 250,000. By 1989 the city's population reached that number and after some legal struggles, the Harrisons obtained their pawn license. That year Harrison and his father opened the Gold & Silver Pawn Shop at 713 Las Vegas Boulevard South, less than two miles from the Las Vegas Strip. By 2005, Harrison and his father were loaning out about $3 million annually, which brought them about $700,000 in interest income.

By 2006, the shop had developed a reputation for carrying special sports items with unique histories, including a 2001 New England Patriots Super Bowl ring that belonged to American football cornerback Brock Williams. It also served gamblers who, according to Harrison's son Corey, often came in to "pawn something so they have gas to get back home."

According to Harrison in 2010, the items most often brought into the store are jewelry. Since the inception of Pawn Stars, Harrison's inventory typically has a ratio of 5,000 items pawned per 12,000.

In 2015, Harrison opened up a Smoke BBQ & Tavern in the shops plaza where he occasionally bartends.

=== Television fame ===
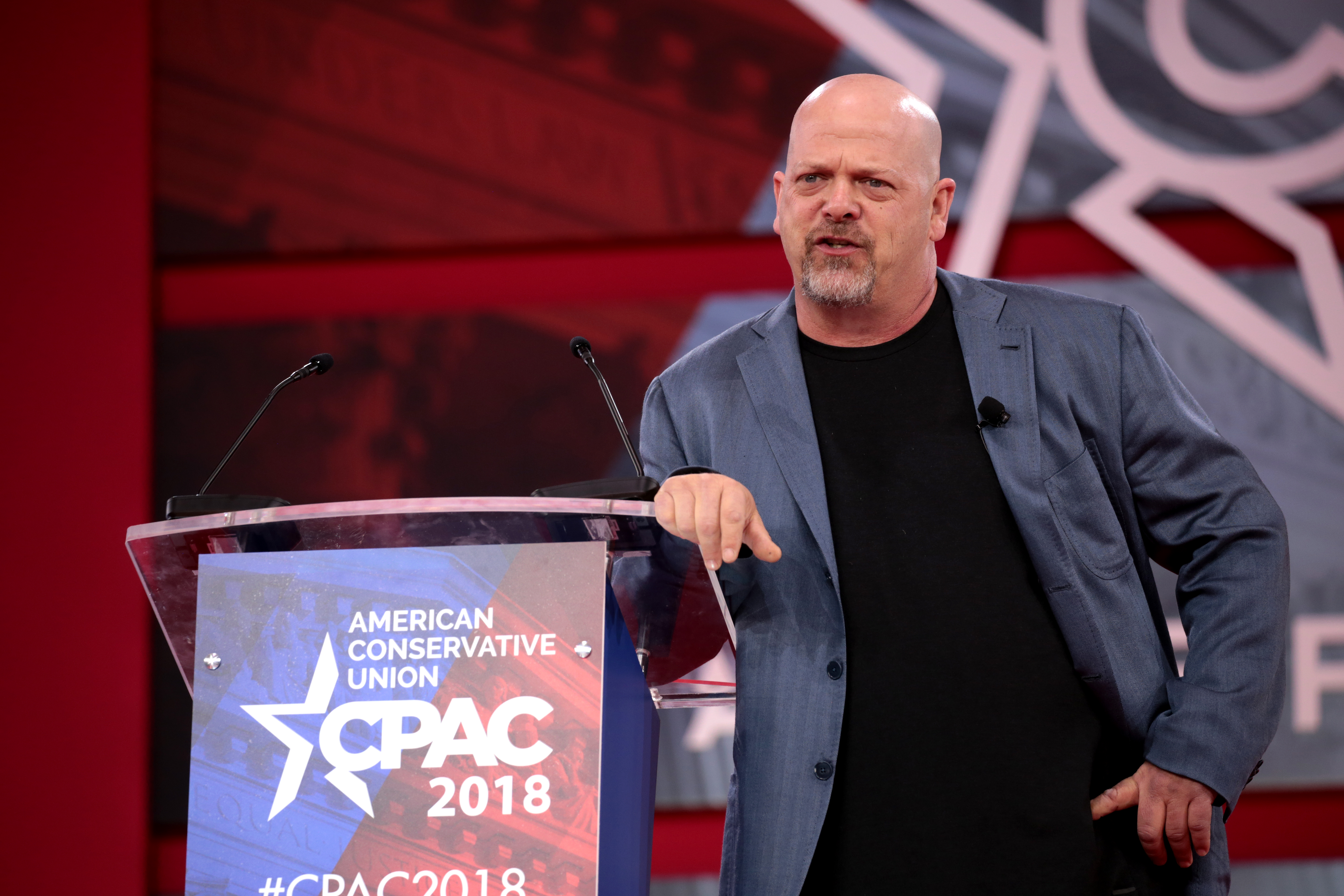
Harrison speaking at the 2018 CPAC in National Harbor, Maryland.

Harrison spent four years pitching the idea of making a show about a pawn shop after his shop was featured in the show Insomniac with Dave Attell in 2003, but his efforts did not yield success. In 2008, Brent Montgomery and Colby Gaines of Leftfield Pictures came up with an idea about a reality show based in a Las Vegas pawn shop and approached Harrison. The series was originally pitched to HBO, though the network preferred the series to have been a Taxicab Confessions-style series taking place at the Gold & Silver's night window. In a February 2009 YouTube video titled "Pawn star$", Corey Harrison promised to gun down an intruder with a handgun he displayed, and a woman screamed as she was removed from the store after demanding that the wedding ring her husband sold to the shop be returned.

Nancy Dubuc of the History Channel changed the format, which included on-camera experts appraising the items brought into the Gold & Silver as well as personality dynamics of the store's staff and patrons. Initially to have been titled Pawning History, the program was renamed Pawn Stars at the suggestion of a Leftfield staffer, playing off the term porn stars for more marketing appeal. The show features Harrison and his father, Richard Harrison (generally referred to as "The Old Man" on the show and who died in June 2018), along with his son Corey ("Big Hoss") and Corey's childhood friend and employee Austin "Chumlee" Russell. In 2010, the National Pawnbrokers Association awarded the Pawnbroker of the Year Award to Harrison for his contributions in enlightening the public about the pawn industry.

In January 2011, Pawn Stars was the highest rated program on the History Channel, and the second-highest rated reality show behind Jersey Shore. On June 7, 2011, Harrison published a biography called License to Pawn: Deals, Steals, and My Life at the Gold & Silver. His book reached No. 22 on The New York Times Best Seller list on June 26, 2011.

Harrison appeared as himself, alongside his son Corey and Chumlee, in "iLost My Head in Vegas", the November 3, 2012 episode of the American TV series iCarly. Four days later, he appeared as an antique store owner in "The Safe", the November 7, 2012 episode of the TV series The Middle.

In January 2014, Harrison became spokesperson for the Micro Touch One Razor, a personal care shaving product for men. Harrison appeared in a television commercial promoting the One Razor product line. In June 2014, History premiered United Stuff of America, a series from the producers of Pawn Stars that focuses on notable artifacts that were used in important moments in history, such as the cane with which Andrew Jackson fended off a presidential assassin, the axe Abraham Lincoln used as a young rail splitter, and the pencils Ulysses S. Grant used to write his memoirs. In July 2014, the game show Pawnography premiered on the History Channel, in which Harrison, Corey, and Chumlee compete against players in an attempt to prevent them from winning cash and items from the inventory of the Gold & Silver Pawn Shop.

In 2022, the first season of Pawn Stars Do America aired featuring Harrison, Corey and Chumlee traveling across the United States buying items.

In 2025, he alongside Chumlee, started the Pawn Stars After Dark Podcast where they discuss behind-the-scenes stories from the Pawn Shop, along with Pawn Stars castmates, and various guests.

== Personal life ==
Harrison splits his time between Las Vegas, Nevada and his off-grid property in Port Orford, Oregon.

Harrison has described himself as "a complete geek" having a deep passion for learning the history of items he acquires. He also has a fixation of antique automobiles as well as being an avid reader. He has also studied aviation in order to get his pilots license, he bought his first plane a TL-3000 Sirius in 2024.

In September 2026, Harrison underwent emergency bypass surgery after his doctors discovered an unexpected medical issue while he was going in for a simpler procedure.

=== Family and relationships ===
Harrison had two sons, Corey and Adam, with his first wife Kim, and one son, Jake, with his second wife, Tracy.

In January 2024, Adam Harrison died from a drug overdose. Adam worked at the pawn shop, and later became a plumber. According to Corey, quoted in a 2012 HuffPost article, Adam had no apparent interest in appearing on the show.

In 2012, Harrison, twice divorced, announced his engagement to Deanna Burditt, who was also twice divorced. The couple married on July 21, 2013, in Laguna Beach, California. Counting Cars star and car expert Danny Koker became an ordained minister and performed the ceremony, while Pawn Stars costar Austin "Chumlee" Russell served as a ring bearer. Through this marriage, he gained three stepdaughters: Sarina, Ciana, and Marissa. The couple divorced in September 2020.

In 2021, Harrison married Amanda Palmer. They split in 2023. On March 6, 2025, Harrison became engaged to Angie Polushkin. They married on January 3, 2026, at A Little White Wedding Chapel in Las Vegas.

=== Political views ===
Harrison with President Donald Trump at a small business summit on May 4, 2026.

In a 2018 interview on the Fox News program Life, Liberty & Levin, Harrison described himself as "more of a libertarian" than a conservative, telling host Mark Levin that history proves that less government leads to a better economy. Harrison supported Donald Trump's candidacy for president, and Daniel Rodimer for Nevada's 3rd congressional district in 2020. He considered a potential run for governor of Nevada in 2022.

Harrison expressed an interest in running for U.S. Senate in 2024, telling the Las Vegas Review-Journal in March 2023, "I've been approached by many in the party and always listen with an open mind. Never say never, but at this time I haven't decided whether or not to throw my hat in the ring." On May 4, 2026, Harrison spoke with President Trump at a small business summit, where he said that Trump would go down as "maybe the best president ever."

== Awards and recognition ==
In March 2010, Harrison, his father, son and Austin "Chumlee" Russell were awarded the key to the city of Las Vegas by Mayor Oscar Goodman.

In 2012, Harrison and his father were nominated for the 2012 Time 100 list.

Harrison and the other stars of Pawn Stars served as grand marshals for the History 300 NASCAR race at the Charlotte Motor Speedway on May 26, 2012.

In 2023, Harrison became a Kentucky Colonel, the highest civic honor awarded by the state of Kentucky.
