= Corey Harrison =

American businessman (born 1983)

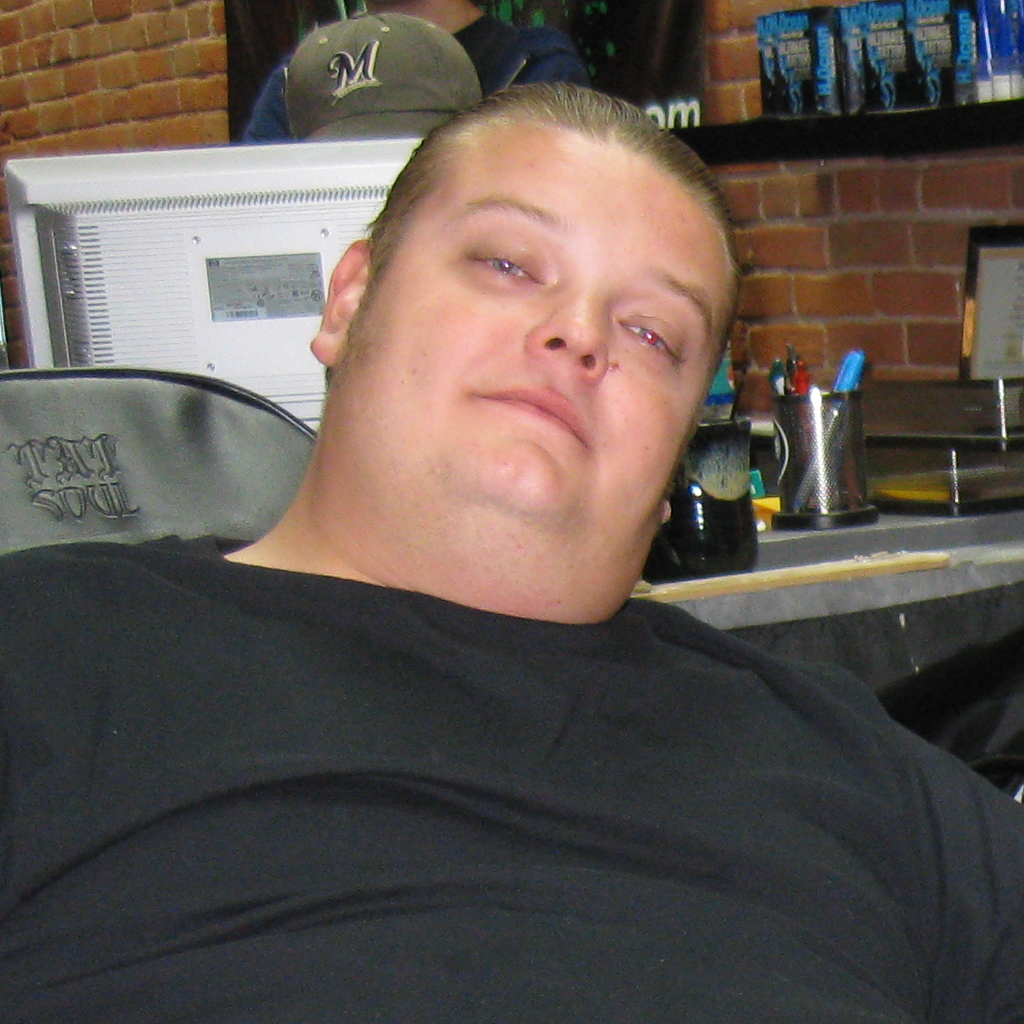
- Harrison in 2013
- Born: Richard Corey Harrison; April 27, 1983 (age 43); Las Vegas, Nevada, U.S.
- Other name: Big Hoss
- Occupations: Businessman; reality television personality
- Years active: 1990s–present
- Spouses: Charlene (m. 2009; div. 2015) Korina "Kiki" Harrison (m. 2017; div. 2018)
- Children: 1
- Father: Rick Harrison
- Family: Richard Benjamin Harrison (grandfather)

Richard Corey Harrison (born April 27, 1983), also known by his nickname "Big Hoss", is an American businessman, reality television personality, and was a cast member of the History TV series Pawn Stars, which documents his work at the World Famous Gold & Silver Pawn Shop in Las Vegas, which he co-owns with his father, Rick Harrison. Harrison left the show in 2025, after 23 seasons and currently hosts his own podcast The Corey Harrison Show.

== Early life ==
Harrison was born on April 27, 1983, one of three sons born to Kim and Rick Harrison, and the grandson of Richard Benjamin Harrison, the then–co-owners of Las Vegas' Gold & Silver Pawn Shop. He attended Centennial High School, and later got his GED from the Sierra Nevada Job Corps.

== Career ==
Harrison began working at the shop at the age of nine. He eventually became the manager of the shop's day-to-day operations and 30 of its employees. He made the most purchases of anyone in the shop. Plots of Pawn Stars often feature Harrison coming into conflict with his father and grandfather over his knowledge of the shop's inventory, his responsibilities as a manager, and his overall judgment in sales, particularly his purchase of expensive items. In Season 7, filmed in 2012, Harrison tells his father and grandfather that he will take a job at another business if he is not given a 10% partnership in the shop. He remains with the shop after he is given a raise and a 5% partnership, with the possibility of a greater stake in the business in the future.

In March 2010, Harrison, along with his grandfather, father, and Chumlee, was awarded the key to the city of Las Vegas by Mayor Oscar Goodman. The group also served as grand marshals for the History 300 NASCAR race at Charlotte Motor Speedway on May 26, 2012.

Harrison appeared as himself, alongside his dad Rick and Chumlee, in an episode of the American TV series iCarly.

In 2022, Pawn Stars Do America debuted, featuring Harrison, his father, and Chumlee traveling across the United States buying items from fans.

In 2025, he announced he did not renew his contract with the History Channel and had moved to Tulum, Mexico where he planned to develop a barbecue restaurant. In 2026, Harrison began hosting his own podcast "The Corey Harrison Show", he co-host the show alongside former Pawn Stars producer Jairus Cobb.

== Personal life ==
Harrison's first wife was his high school sweetheart, Charlene, whom he married in 2009. They divorced in 2015.

On May 26, 2017, Harrison married his second wife, Korina "Kiki" Harrison. Their divorce was finalized in September 2018. Harrison cited as the reason for the divorce their competitive work schedules, though the end of their marriage was an amicable one. In October 2018, their son, Richard Benjamin Harrison, was born.

In 2010, Harrison started losing weight after his doctor put him on diabetes medication. He then got weight loss surgery, stating: "I literally drove straight from the doctor to the lap band center and had the surgery almost immediately."

On September 8, 2023, Harrison was arrested in Las Vegas after an officer in the area of Main Street and Charleston Boulevard observed Harrison's white Ford pickup truck swerving between the right lane and bicycle lane. After Harrison was pulled over, the officer noticed a smell of alcohol from his car, and observed signs that Harrison was inebriated. After Harrison declined a field sobriety test, he was taken to Las Vegas city jail, where he gave a blood sample, as the jail's breathalyzer was not working, and was then booked on a charge of driving under the influence.

Harrison has been described as a motorcycle enthusiast owning multiple bikes. In January 2026, Harrison got into a major accident while riding his motorcycle in Tulum, Mexico, fracturing 11 of his ribs. In March 2026, he asked for help from fans to pay bills from the accident.
