= Pawn Stars =

American reality television series

- From left: Rick Harrison, Austin "Chumlee" Russell, Corey Harrison, and Richard Harrison
- Genre: Reality television
- Starring: Rick Harrison; Richard "Old Man" Harrison; Corey "Big Hoss" Harrison; Austin "Chumlee" Russell
- Country of origin: United States
- Original language: English
- No. of seasons: 23
- No. of episodes: 675 (list of episodes)

Production
- Executive producers: Mary E. Donahue; Brent Montgomery; Matthew Braley; Joel Patterson; Nicole Kaye; Shawn Witt; Gretchen Palek; Simon Thomas; Tracy Whittaker; Sean Moran; Rick Harrison
- Running time: 20–21 minutes (2009–2018); 40–42 minutes (2019–present)
- Production companies: Leftfield Pictures; Trifecta Entertainment & Media (syndication)

Original release
- Network: History
- Release: July 19, 2009 – present

Related
- American Restoration; Cajun Pawn Stars; Counting Cars; Pawn Stars UK; Pawnography; Pawn Stars Australia

Pawn Stars is an American reality television series shown on History and produced by Leftfield Pictures. The series is filmed in Las Vegas, Nevada, where it chronicles the daily activities at the World Famous Gold & Silver Pawn Shop, a 24-hour family business opened in 1989 and originally operated by patriarch Richard "Old Man" Harrison, his son Rick Harrison, Rick's son Corey "Big Hoss" Harrison, and Corey's childhood friend, Austin "Chumlee" Russell. The series, which became the network's highest rated show, and the No. 2 reality show on television, behind Jersey Shore, debuted on July 19, 2009.

The series depicts the staff's interactions with customers, which consist of buying, selling, and pawning artifacts; haggling over the price, and discussing the artifacts' historical background, with narration provided by either the Harrisons or Chumlee.

The series also follows the interpersonal conflicts among the cast. One reviewer referencing these conflicts described the show as a version of Antiques Roadshow "hijacked by American Chopper's Teutul family." TV Guide has offered a similar description, calling the show "one part Antiques Roadshow, a pinch of LA Ink and a dash of COPS."

Numerous local experts in a variety of fields also regularly appear to appraise the items being sold or pawned, two of whom have gone on to their own spin-off programs. Antique restorer/metal artist Rick Dale is the star of the series' first spin-off, American Restoration, which premiered in October 2010, and mechanic/auto restoration expert Danny "The Count" Koker stars in the second spin-off, Counting Cars, which debuted August 13, 2012.

The series has become a global phenomenon, broadcast in 150 countries and dubbed in 38 languages.

== Production history and format ==
The concept for Pawn Stars was conceived by Brent Montgomery and Colby Gaines of Leftfield Pictures, who were struck by the array of eclectic and somewhat seedy pawn shops in Las Vegas during a 2008 weekend visit to the city. Thinking such shops might contain unique characters, they searched for a family-run shop on which to center a TV series, until they found the Gold & Silver Pawn Shop less than two miles from the Las Vegas Strip. It had been the subject of a 2001 PBS documentary, and the manager and part-owner, Rick Harrison, had been trying unsuccessfully to pitch a show based on his shop for four years. Both the shop and Rick had previously been featured in the Las Vegas episode of Insomniac with Dave Attell in 2003.

The series was originally pitched to HBO, which wanted the series to be a Taxicab Confessions-style series taking place at the Gold & Silver's night window. The format eventually evolved into the now-familiar family-oriented motif used in the series. The series was picked up by History president Nancy Dubuc, who was trying to create more mainstream programs to balance out the network's surfeit of in-depth military programming. The show was initially titled Pawning History before a staffer at Leftfield suggested that Pawn Stars would fit better with the locale, and the network agreed, believing that name to be more memorable. The name is an intentional pun on the phrase "porn stars". The show's storyline was tweaked to bring it in line with the network's brand, which included the addition of on-camera experts appraising the items brought into the Gold & Silver, although interpersonal conflicts among the show's stars were not discouraged.

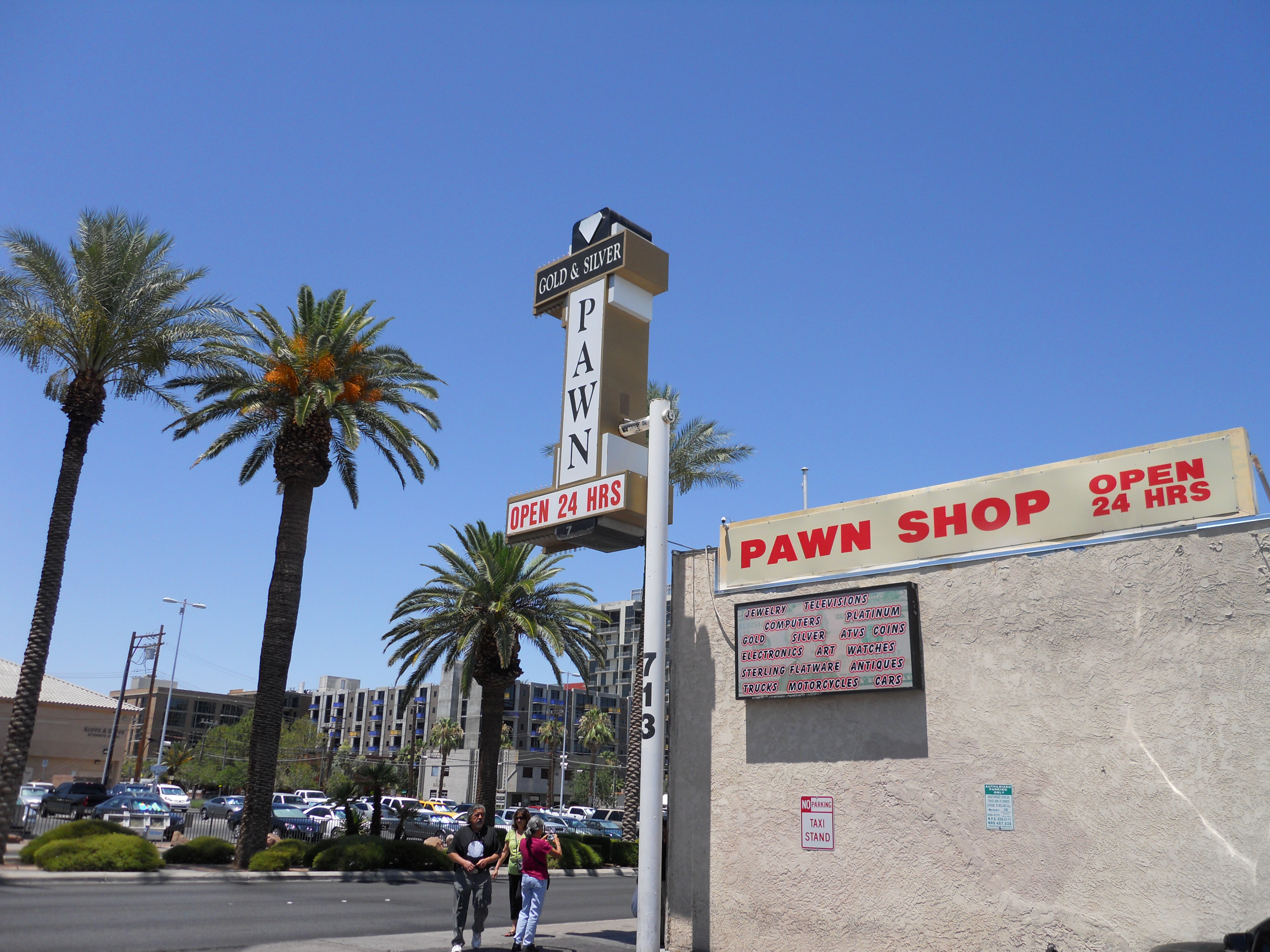
World Famous Gold & Silver Pawn Shop in 2010

The series is filmed on location at the World-Famous Gold & Silver Pawn Shop in Las Vegas, Nevada. Although jewelry is the most commonly pawned item at the Gold & Silver Pawn Shop, most of the customers featured in Pawn Stars episodes bring in a variety of vintage or antique items to the store, which has 12,000 items in its inventory as of July 2011 (5,000 of which are typically held on pawn). Each episode consists of segments devoted to approximately five or six of these items in which one of the staff members, usually Rick Harrison, his son Corey, or Harrison's father Richard (known as the "Old Man"), explains the history behind the object. When the buyer is unable to evaluate an object, they consult with an expert who can evaluate it to determine its authenticity and potential value, and in the case of items needing repair, the cost of restoration or preparing the item for sale. Whoever is evaluating the object goes over the potential value with the customer, including the expert's opinion, if one is given, often interspersed with an interview in which he explains the basis of his decision to the viewer. A price tag graphic at the bottom corner of the screen displays the ever-changing dollar amount as the two negotiate over the item's price. On occasion, Rick will take the risk of purchasing items in need of restoration before determining their restoration costs, as demonstrated by his purchase of a marine chronometer in "Sharks and Cobras", and a barber's chair in "A Shot and a Shave".

Also factoring into episode plots are narratives focusing on the relationships and conflicts among Rick, Corey, the Old Man, and Corey's childhood friend, Austin "Chumlee" Russell, who also works at the shop. Common conflicts include how to run the shop, the elder Harrisons questioning Corey's judgment, and aspersions cast on Chumlee's intelligence and competence.

Before the second commercial break, a multiple-choice trivia question related to the shop and its inventory, the cast members, or one of the featured items is shown, with the answer provided after the break; beginning with the Season 8 episode "A Very Vegas Christmas," a trivia question is asked at every commercial break.

In addition to spawning imitators and clones, such as the truTV series Hardcore Pawn, and History's own Cajun Pawn Stars, the success of Pawn Stars has been a boon to the Gold & Silver Pawn Shop, which has become a Las Vegas tourist site, and has expanded its business operations accordingly. Originally averaging between 70 and 100 customers per day, the shop's traffic increased to more than 1,000 per day by October 2010. To handle the increased business, the shop hired nearly 30 new employees, and underwent a $400,000 expansion of their showroom by two thirds, to 15,000 square feet, the shop's tenth expansion since it opened. Rick Harrison also mentioned in the Season 4 episode "Over the Top" that he was building a gym above the Pawn Shop for the staff's use. The shop also sells its own brand merchandise, the designs of which originate from fans entering design competitions on Facebook, which saves the Harrisons the cost of hiring professional designers. The staff's presence on Facebook and Twitter also ensures audiences during local nightclub appearances, for which Corey Harrison and Chumlee Russell are paid $1,000 a night. However, as a result of filming at the shop, the four main cast members can only work the main counter during shoot days. This is due to laws requiring the identities of customers pawning items to remain confidential, and tourists and fans taking photos and video in the showroom would preclude this. When shooting episodes of the series, the store is temporarily closed to the public, with only a handful of vetted customers allowed into the showroom.

In July 2011, Harrison signed a record-breaking 80-episode renewal contract for four more seasons of the series.

After being broadcast during its first four years on Mondays at 10 p.m. ET, the program moved to Thursday nights at 9 p.m. ET on May 30, 2013, replacing Swamp People, which moved an hour later to 10 p.m. ET. The program also received a new opening and theme song, "Winning Isn't Everything," performed by Lynyrd Skynyrd. The opening was replaced again with different theme music from an uncredited artist on June 12, 2014.

=== Episodes ===
Season	Episodes	Originally released	
Season	Episodes	First released	Last released
1	25	July 19, 2009	December 27, 2009
2	33	January 18, 2010	July 12, 2010
3	30	August 16, 2010	March 28, 2011
4	38	April 4, 2011	November 8, 2011
5	30	November 28, 2011	March 5, 2012
6	28	April 9, 2012	September 3, 2012
7	34	November 5, 2012	March 11, 2013
8	46	May 30, 2013	December 26, 2013
9	52	January 2, 2014	June 26, 2014
10	47	July 10, 2014	December 22, 2014
11	42	January 8, 2015	August 10, 2015
12	45	October 22, 2015	July 20, 2016
13	29	July 27, 2016	February 6, 2017
14	30	April 10, 2017	August 28, 2017
15	30	October 16, 2017	June 27, 2018
16	20	January 21, 2019	August 19, 2019
17	28	October 21, 2019	July 27, 2020
18	26	November 16, 2020	September 25, 2021
19	14	October 2, 2021	December 18, 2021
20	13	April 23, 2022	November 2, 2022
21	15	March 15, 2023	June 28, 2023
22	10	July 10, 2024	September 25, 2024
23	10	January 22, 2025	April 2, 2025
24	10	January 7, 2026	March 18, 2026
25	TBA	October 7, 2026	TBA

== Cast ==
=== Main shop staff ===
- Richard "Rick" Kevin Harrison – Co-founder/co-owner of the pawn shop. The son of "The Old Man" Richard and father of "Big Hoss" Corey, he has earned the nickname "The Spotter" due to his sharp eye for rare and valuable items. He started in the pawn business at the age 13. Rick co-founded the "Gold & Silver" pawn shop with his father in 1989, at the age of 23. Boasting that "Gold & Silver" is the only family-owned pawn shop in Las Vegas, Rick says he dropped out of high school in the tenth grade because he was making $2,000 a week selling fake Gucci bags. An avid reader since childhood, his favorite area of historical study is the Royal Navy, from the late 1700s to the early 1800s. Harrison also appears on United Stuff of America, an H2 series from the producers of Pawn Stars that focuses on notable artifacts that were used in important moments in history, which premiered in June 2014.
- Richard Benjamin "The Old Man" Harrison – Rick's father, Corey's grandfather, and the founder/co-owner of the pawn shop, which he opened in 1989 with his son Rick. He was usually referred to by his nickname, "The Old Man," which he earned at age 38, according to the episode "Fired Up." The Lexington, North Carolina, native and 20-year veteran of the U.S. Navy, was the first to arrive at the shop in the morning, and had not had a sick day since 1994. He was especially passionate about automobiles, showing an interest in all types of cars, from the 1966 Chrysler Imperial his son and grandson had restored for his 50th wedding anniversary to the mid-1960s B&Z Electra-King electric car shown to them in "Honest Abe," which he suggested could be converted into a golf cart. In the episode that aired on July 31, 2017, it was mentioned that he was retired. Harrison died in June 2018.
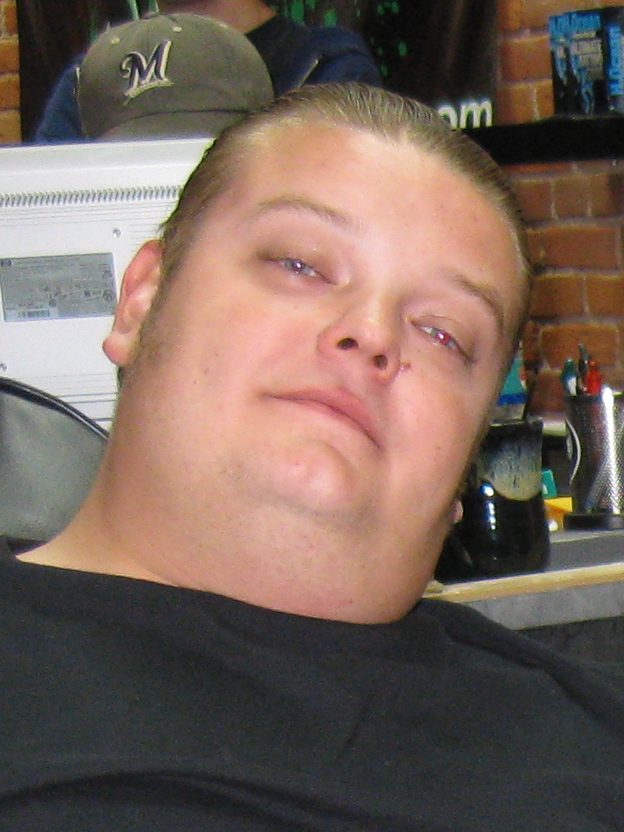
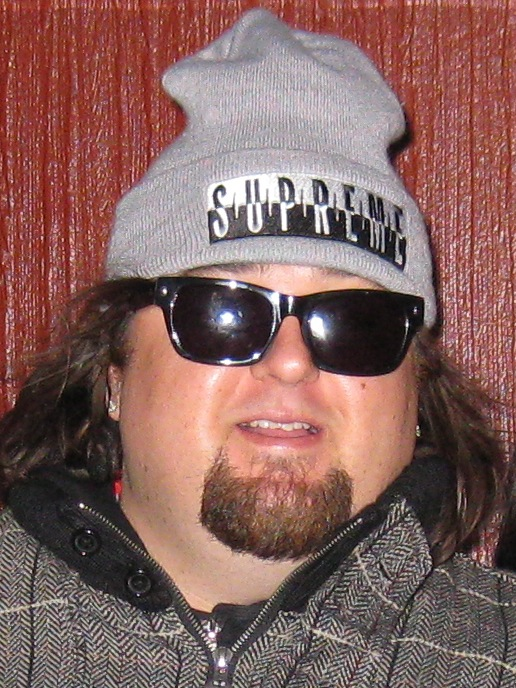
Corey Harrison (left) and Austin "Chumlee" Russell pictured in 2010. Both are part of the main staff of the pawn shop.
- Corey Harrison – Rick's son and Richard's grandson, who is nicknamed "Big Hoss." and started working at the shop at age nine, polishing jewelry. He is now the manager of the shop's day-to-day operations, makes the most purchases of anyone in the shop and is being groomed by Rick to be the boss one day. Corey often comes into conflict with his father and grandfather over his knowledge of the shop's inventory, his responsibilities as a manager, and his overall judgment in sales, in particular his purchases of expensive items. Following gastric lap band surgery in 2010 and a change to his diet, Harrison's weight went down from 402 lb (182 kg) to approximately 210 lb (95 kg) by July 2014. In Season 6, he tells the elder Harrisons that he will take a job at another business if he is not given a 10% partnership in the shop. He remains with the shop after he is given a raise and a 5% partnership with the possibility of a greater stake in the business in the future. In 2025, he announced he did not renew his contract with the History Channel and had moved to Tulum, Mexico, departing from the show after 23 seasons.
- Austin "Chumlee" Russell – Corey's friend, who started working at the shop when he was 21. Chumlee was given his nickname aged twelve by the father of a childhood friend, who named him after the walrus sidekick of Tennessee Tuxedo. He does behind-the-counter work at the shop, such as testing the items, loading them, and writing the tickets for items purchased by others. He is often the butt of the others' jokes for his perceived lack of intelligence and his incompetence, for which he has been referred to as a "village idiot." Chumlee has responded to this by explaining that he is underestimated and points to his expertise in pinball machines, which he utilizes in the second-season episode "Pinball Wizards," much to Corey's surprise, as an example of one of the areas in which he is knowledgeable. Chumlee later displays the ability to repair a gas-powered toy car in "Never Surrender" and expert knowledge in discerning a fake pair of Air Jordan V sneakers in the following episode, "Honest Abe". As a result of the show, Russell formed his own company which sells novelty items, including T-shirts of his own design, and arranges for his personal appearances. He sold half of the company in 2010 to Rick Harrison for $155,000, so that the shop could handle orders of his merchandise more efficiently.

=== Minor shop staff ===
- Danielle "Peaches" Rainey – One of the shop staff members. In the episode "Rope a Dope" she is punished for her habitual tardiness by being put on the graveyard shift with Chumlee, who harbors an unrequited affection for her. She reluctantly helps Rick appraise a box of Playboy magazines in "Peaches & Pinups," despite her distaste for the task. The Old Man asks her about Chumlee's whereabouts in "Chum Goes AWOL". She is also seen socializing with the other shop staff in the closing scene of "Confederate Conundrum".
- Olivia Black – A night shift employee hired in Season 5. She is among the applicants favored by Corey and Chumlee, because of her attractiveness, when they screen the applicants in "Learning the Ropes". She is hired, after being further interviewed by Rick and The Old Man in "Crosby, Stills and Cash", and begins her training in "Les is More". In "Corey's Big Burn", she is shown working with night shift customers with Chumlee, though Rick and The Old Man express concern that the double shifts Chumlee is working as a result of volunteering to train her (which they perceive to be motivated solely by his attraction to her) might be too much for him. Black was fired from the show on December 19, 2012, when her 2008 nude modeling work for the soft porn website SuicideGirls was revealed. Four days after being fired from Pawn Stars, she returned to SuicideGirls and shot a new pictorial for them. She was fired only from the show, not from the shop, where she continued to work off-camera before quitting a few months later.

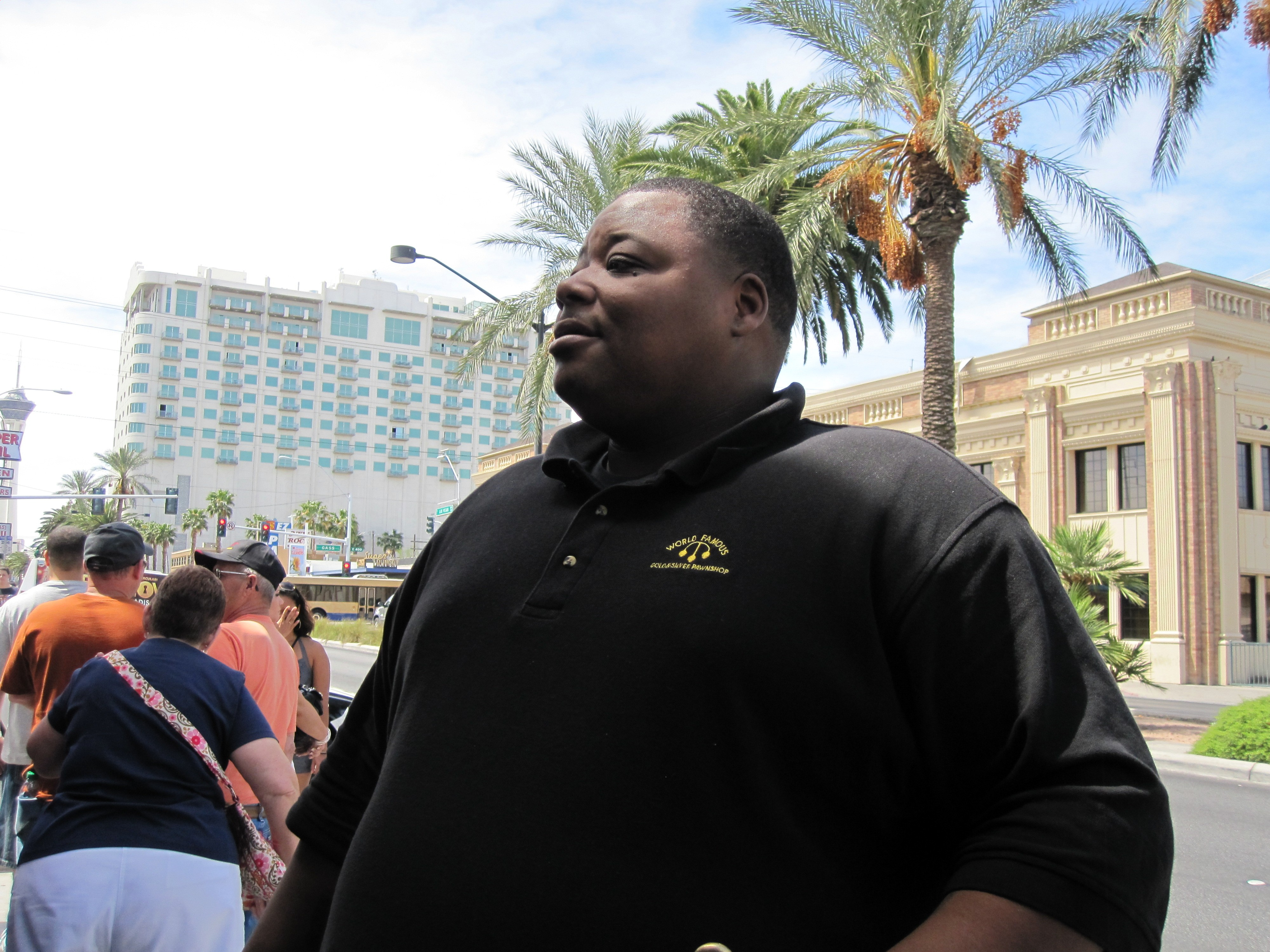
Antwaun Austin works as bouncer in the shop.

- Antwaun Austin – The shop's 6'5" security guard. Usually seen in the background, Antwaun sometimes sells store T-shirts to people who come in, helps customers carry large items, and when necessary, removes customers who are unruly or disruptive. In "Flight of the Chum", for example, he attempts to intervene when a seller becomes irate after Rick informs him that the Perseus statue he brought into the shop is not an original by Émile Louis Picault, but a copy. He features heavily in an episode storyline for the first time in the Season 4 episode "Teacher's Pet" in which he is revealed to have worked at the shop for three years and is tutored by Chumlee on negotiating prices and discerning genuine gold. When he later prepares to take a few days off in "Security," he in turn tutors Chumlee on how to work the door.
- Fat Back – An in-house mechanic, who also provides appraisals on the condition of vehicles.
- Johnny – An in-house mechanic and expert in racing and other sporting memorabilia.
- Scott – One of the shop's part-time employees, who spends much of his time at flea markets and estate sales, purchasing items that Rick will purchase from him to sell in the shop.
- Andy – The shop's head of security. He first features prominently in a storyline in the Season 6 episode "Shekel and Hyde".
- Lili – A college intern at the shop from UNLV. She is hired as an intern in the Season 8 episode "What Happens in Vegas" and is later promoted to a part-time paid position at the shop in the Season 9 episode "Ponies and Phonies."

=== Recurring experts ===
Professional specialists are sometimes called in by the pawn shop to determine the authenticity and value of the items brought in, and in some cases, to restore them. The following is a list of recurring experts who have appeared in two or more episodes.

Name	Area of expertise
Mark Allen	Performer and collector of Western memorabilia, and owner of Wild West Arts Club and Western Stage Props.
Jesse Amoroso	Expert in stringed instruments, and owner of Cowtown Guitars.
Brenda Anderson	Handwriting expert and owner of Expert Handwriting Analysis.
Joe Ashman	Expert in guns and weapons, and owner of Ashman's Pioneer Market in Fillmore, Utah.
David Baker	Expert in antique swords. Also appears as a judge in History TV's Forged in Fire.
Jemison Beshears	Expert in weapons and antique arms.
Jeremy Brown	Expert in sports memorabilia and cards, and owner of Ultimate Sports Cards & Memorabilia.
Alex Cranmer	Antique weapons and military collectibles expert.
Rick Dale	Metal artist and antique restorer, and owner of Rick's Restorations. Dale also stars in American Restoration, a spin-off set at Rick's Restorations and starring Dale and his staff, which premiered in October 2010.
Tony Dee	Antique firearms expert, who operates The Gun Store.
Bob Demel	Expert in antique weapons, militaria and other types of antiques, and owner of Antiques, Arms & Armor Historical Investments, Coto de Caza, California.
Ferdinand Geitner	Master watchmaker and clockmaker, expert in timepieces, and owner of Montecito Clock Gallery.
Craig Gottlieb	Firearms and military antiques expert, and owner of Craig Gottlieb Military Antiques. Like Rick Harrison, he also appears on the series United Stuff of America.
Steve Grad	Principal authenticator at Becket Authentication Services.
Mark Hall-Patton	Expert in 20th century artifacts and history, and administrator of the Clark County Heritage Museum and the Howard W. Cannon Aviation Museum at Reid Airport. Hall-Patton, affectionately nicknamed The Beard of Knowledge, is the expert most often consulted by the Harrisons, and also appears on the spinoff American Restoration. Unlike most of the experts who appear on the show, Hall-Patton never offers a financial estimate of an item's value, preferring to only establish authenticity and historical significance. This is in keeping with the International Council of Museums ethics code and many museum policies against staff providing monetary appraisals. Although the Clark County Museum was little-known outside of Las Vegas, and has no advertising budget, annual attendance soared nearly 70% since 2012, reaching 42,000 in 2013. Like Rick Harrison, he also appears on the series United Stuff of America.
Johnny Jimenez	Expert in vintage toys, and owner of Toy Shack of Las Vegas.
Steve Johnston	Expert in vintage toys and owner of Rogue Toys.
Danny "The Count" Koker	Motorcycle and automobile restoration expert, and owner of Count's Kustoms. Koker has also guest-starred on Rick Dale's spinoff, American Restoration, and stars in his own spinoff, Counting Cars, which premiered in August 2012.
Wally Korhonen	Expert in automobile restoration and owner of Rusty Nuts Rods and Customs.
Dana Linett	Expert in artifacts from Early American history, including the Colonial and Revolutionary periods, and President of Early American History Auctions.
Mark Logan	Expert in classic and performance cars, as well as dragsters, and President of Nevada Classics, Inc. and Shelby Cars Northwest.
Brett Maly	Fine art appraiser for Art Encounter in Las Vegas.
Drew Max	Forensic document examiner/handwriting expert, and owner of Authentic Autographs Unlimited.
Paul Milbury	Owner of Military Historical Arms & Antiques. An expert in historical military arms and antiques from 1776 – World War II.
Roy Page	Expert in vintage vacuum tube appliances, and owner of Roy's Repair-O-Rama, which specializes in such appliances.
Sean Rich	Antique arms and armory expert, specializing in the 16th to 18th centuries, and owner of Tortuga Trading Inc. He also appeared as an expert in the National Geographic Channel show Lords of War.
Rebecca Romney	Expert in rare books, manuscripts and documents from the 15th to the 21st centuries; former manager at the Las Vegas Gallery of Bauman Rare Books, and co-founder of rare book firm Type Punch Matrix.
Charles Roof	Archery specialist and manager of Pacific Archery Sales.
Murray SawChuck	Professional magician, magic historian, and owner of Murray Productions Inc.
Matthew C. Shortal	Aviation expert, Marine F-18 and Navy Blue Angels pilot, and graduate of Top Gun.
Jay Tell	Expert in coins, paper currency and stamps, and owner of Americana Stamp & Coin Galleries.
David Vagi	Expert in coins and director of NGC Ancients.
Mike Yamasaki	Japanese sword authenticator.
Bill Ybarzabal	Boat restorer and owner of A1A Marine Tech.

== Reception ==
=== U.S. television ratings ===
By January 2011, Pawn Stars was History's highest-rated series. An original episode broadcast on January 24, 2011, was watched by seven million viewers, the most watched telecast ever on the History channel, according to the network and Nielsen Media Research. In 2011, it was the second-highest-rated reality series on TV behind Jersey Shore, attracting 7.6 million viewers. In 2016, a New York Times study of the 50 TV shows with the most Facebook likes found that Pawn Stars was most popular in rural Kentucky.

=== Critical reception ===
Christopher Long, reviewing the first season DVD for DVD Town, praised the series for its cast and the educational value of the items examined, calling it 'addictive' and "...a big-time winner..." and opined that it is the best show on History, and perhaps cable. In one issue of TV Guide, writer Rob Moynihan included the show in a list of "guilty pleasures." April McIntyre of Monsters and Critics, whose negative view of pawn shops influenced her view of the series' setting, reviewed one episode of the series, which she labeled a "cool Antiques Roadshow." Though she found aspects of it interesting, she criticized what she perceived as an emphasis on cheap laughs at the expense of family patriarch Richard Harrison over the show's historical material, as well as Corey Harrison's weight. She ultimately saw potential for the series if aspects of it that she found to be in poor taste were curbed. USA Today's Gary Strauss opined that the bickering among the Harrisons, as well as the customers seen in the shop, is "alternately amusing and grating." People magazine wrote of the show, "Think Antiques Roadshow, but with neon and far more tattoos." Some of History's viewers were reportedly displeased with how reality series like Pawn Stars and Swamp People have replaced some of the network's previous history-oriented programming.

The series has also attracted some criticism from other pawnbrokers, who while conceding its entertainment value, claim that the series' focus on the extravagant vintage items brought into the Gold & Silver Pawn Shop are not typical of the average pawn shop, whose business is predicated on an individual's fixed income who bring in conventional objects in order to pay their bills, such as electronics, tools, and jewelry. Corey Grigson and Charles Brown, who own a shop called Pawn Stars, estimate that their average loan to a customer is between $50 and $100. They also point out that appraisals are handled by the staff, who rely on experience, reference works, and research, and not the outside experts who are frequently seen on the show aiding the Harrisons.

The success of the series has also lent itself to parody. At the June 2011 NHL Awards in Las Vegas, the Hanson Brothers from the movie Slap Shot appeared in a spoof sketch in which they try to sell the Stanley Cup to Harrison at the Gold & Silver.

=== Honors ===
In 2010, Rick Harrison and the staff of the Gold and Silver Pawn Shop were awarded the Pawnbroker of the Year Award by the National Pawnbrokers Association for bringing the industry greater recognition and a better image with the TV show.

On July 17, 2012, the Clark County Commission declared that day to be "Pawn Stars/Gold & Silver Pawn Day." At the Commission meeting, Richard "The Old Man" Harrison donated $1,000 to the Clark County Heritage Museum, and lent the U.S. Senate floor chair used by Senator Patrick McCarran (sold to the Gold and Silver in the Pawn Stars episode "Take a Seat") to the museum as part of a display on Senator McCarran.

The stars of Pawn Stars served as grand marshals for the History 300 NASCAR race at the Charlotte Motor Speedway on May 26, 2012.

=== Awards and nominations ===
Year	Award	Category	Result
2010	ASCAP Film and Television Music Awards	The Most-Played Song on Cable Television (intro song written by Jared Gutstadt)	Won
2011	ASCAP Film and Television Music Awards	Top Television Series	Won
2012	ASCAP Film and Television Music Awards	Top Television Series	Won
2013	ASCAP Film and Television Music Awards	Top Television Series	Won
2012	Critics' Choice Television Award	Best Reality Series	Nominated
2013	Critics' Choice Television Award	Best Reality Series	Nominated
2016	Critics' Choice Television Award	Best Unstructured Reality Show	Nominated

=== Legal issues ===
In October 2012, A&E Networks and History, as well as cast members from the show, were sued in Clark County District Court in Las Vegas for interference with business practices by Wayne Jefferies, a Las Vegas promoter and the Harrisons' manager, who represented them and Austin "Chumlee" Russell in their television business dealings. Jefferies, who was instrumental in helping to launch the series, states that after the show premiered, his influence in the show was increasingly reduced, and he was ultimately fired and left without his promised share of fees and merchandising royalties from the series. Jefferies states that this occurred after a leaked story on TMZ in January 2012 that indicated that the Pawn Stars cast was taken aback by History's launch of the spinoff Cajun Pawn Stars, which the cast had been unaware of.

On March 9, 2016, Chumlee's home was raided during the course of an investigation into sexual assault allegations. During searches of his residence, police found crystal meth, marijuana, Xanax, and multiple firearms. Evidence of possible cocaine use was also found. In March 2016, Austin "Chumlee" Russell pleaded guilty to charges stemming from police having discovered an arsenal of weapons, marijuana, and other drugs at his home in Las Vegas.

== Spin-offs and similar series by Leftfield ==
Following the success of Pawn Stars, Leftfield Pictures created the following spin-offs of Pawn Stars:

- American Restoration was Pawn Stars' first spinoff. It stars Rick Dale and his crew at Rick's Restorations and premiered in October 2010.
- Cajun Pawn Stars is set at the Silver Dollar Pawn & Jewelry Center, a pawn shop in Alexandria, Louisiana that is owned and operated by Jimmie DeRamus and his family. The show, which follows the same format as the original Pawn Stars, debuted on History on January 8, 2012.
- Counting Cars stars Danny "The Count" Koker, proprietor of Count's Kustoms, and follows a format similar to American Restoration, in which Koker and his staff restore and modify classic automobiles. Counting Cars debuted on August 13, 2012, after Pawn Stars.
- Pawn Stars UK is a local version of Pawn Stars set in the United Kingdom, which premiered in the UK on the History channel on August 26, 2013. Like Cajun Pawn Stars, Pawn Stars UK shows the trade of collectibles from the local perspective. It ran for two seasons from 2013 to 2015. There were talks about filming a third season, but the pawn shop featured in the show, Regal Pawn, shut down under mysterious circumstances.
- Pawnography is a game show that first aired on July 10, 2014, on History. Hosted by comedian Christopher Titus and featuring Rick, Corey, and Chumlee as panelists, Pawnography features contestants answering questions related to selected items sold at the Gold and Silver, for a chance to win said items.
- Pawn Stars SA is a local version of Pawn Stars set in South Africa; that premiered on October 14, 2014, on the DSTV channel.
- Pawn Stars Australia is a local version of Pawn Stars set in Australia, that premiered in 2015 on Foxtel.

In addition, Leftfield created five similar series that follow the same format as Pawn Stars:

- Oddities, a Discovery Channel series which premiered in November 2010, focusing on the operations of a New York-based antiques shop.
- Oddities: San Francisco, a spin-off of Oddities taking place at a San Francisco-based antiques shop, which debuted in June 2012 on the Science channel.
- What the Sell?!, a TLC series that debuted in March 2011, about three generations of women running an antiques shop in Wheaton, Illinois.
- Ball Boys, an ABC series that debuted March 2012, about an owner of a sports collectibles shop and his son in Baltimore, Maryland.
- United Stuff of America, an H2 series that focuses on artifacts that played a key role in history, such as the cane with which Andrew Jackson fended off a presidential assassin, the axe Abraham Lincoln used as a young rail splitter, and the pencils Ulysses S. Grant used to write his memoirs.

== Merchandise ==
In 2011, History launched Pawn Stars: The Game for play on Facebook.

In June 2011, Rick Harrison's autobiography, License to Pawn: Deals, Steals, and My Life at the Gold & Silver, was published by Hyperion Books. Harrison's autobiography details his childhood, some of the troubles he faced before he got into the pawning business, as well as anecdotes from his time at the Gold & Silver. Also, The Old Man, Corey, and Chumlee have their own chapters in the book, reflecting on their life and experiences at the pawn shop.

In October 2011, the Redwood Hills Financial Group issued the Modern Cash Prepaid MasterCard Limited Edition: Gold & Silver Pawn Shop prepaid debit card, in a special tie-in with the Gold and Silver Pawn Shop.

On September 5, 2012, it was announced that Bally Technologies would unveil a new slot machine featuring the cast of Pawn Stars the following month at the 2012 Global Gaming Expo, which took place from October 2 to 4, 2012 in Las Vegas.

== See also ==
- List of television shows set in Las Vegas
- American Pickers, itinerant buyers of antiques and collectibles
- Auction Hunters, a series on Spike
- Auction Kings, a similar series on Discovery Channel
- Comic Book Men, set at filmmaker Kevin Smith's comic book store, the show has been described as "Pawn Stars for geeks".
- Comic Store Heroes, set at Midtown Comics in Manhattan.
- Hardcore Pawn, a similar series on truTV
- Pawn Queens, a similar series with female pawn shop operators, airing on TLC
- Storage Hunters, a series on truTV
- Storage Wars, a series on A&E

== Sources ==
- Harrison, Rick; Keown, Tim (2011). License to Pawn: Deals, Steals, and My Life at the Gold & Silver. New York City: Hyperion Books. ISBN 978-1-4013-2430-8.
