= Pontiac Firebird (second generation) =

Second generation
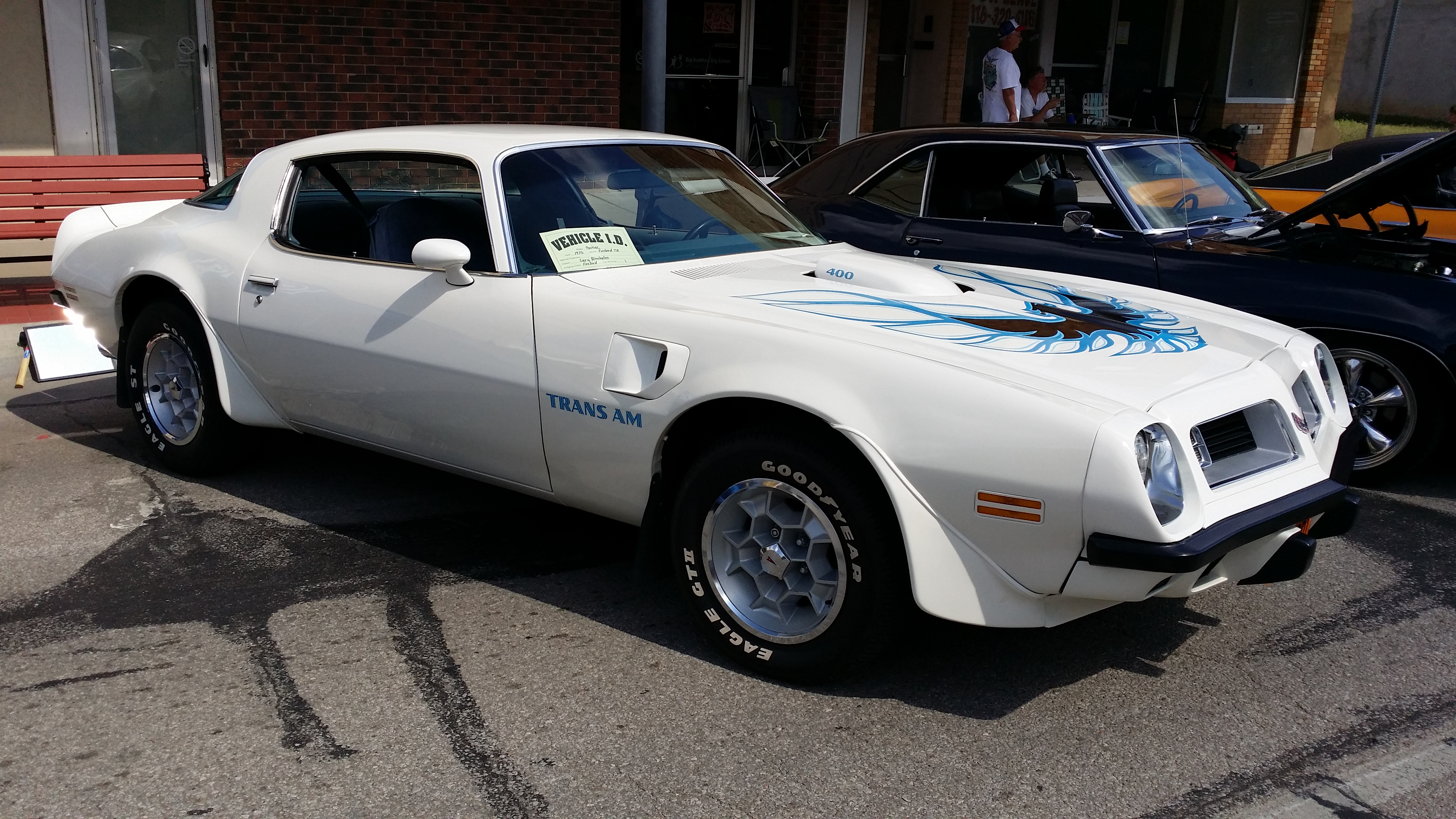
- 1975 Firebird Trans Am

Overview
- Manufacturer: Pontiac (General Motors)
- Production: 1970–1981
- Assembly: United States: Van Nuys, California (1970–1971, 1978–1981); United States: Norwood, Ohio (1970–1981)
- Designer: Bill Porter

Body and chassis
- Body style: 2-door coupe
- Platform: F-body
- Related: Chevrolet Camaro (second generation)

Powertrain
- Engine: 231 cu in (3.8 L) Buick V6; 250 cu in (4.1 L) Chevrolet I6; 265 cu in (4.3 L) Pontiac V8; 301 cu in (4.9 L) Pontiac V8; 301 cu in (4.9 L) Pontiac turbo V8; 305 cu in (5.0 L) Chevrolet V8; 350 cu in (5.7 L) Oldsmobile V8 (Note: Chevrolet 350, VIN code "L", and Oldsmobile 350, VIN code "R", engines were all used.); 350 cu in (5.7 L) Chevrolet V8; 350 cu in (5.7 L) Pontiac V8; 400 cu in (6.6 L) Pontiac V8; 403 cu in (6.6 L) Oldsmobile V8; 455 cu in (7.5 L) Pontiac V8
- Transmission: 3-speed manual 4-speed manual 2-speed automatic 3-speed automatic

Dimensions
- Wheelbase: 108.2 in (2,748 mm) (1978)
- Length: 196.8 in (4,999 mm) (1978)
- Width: 73.4 in (1,864 mm) (1978)
- Height: 49.3 in (1,252 mm) (1978)

Chronology
- Predecessor: Pontiac Firebird (first generation)
- Successor: Pontiac Firebird (third generation)

The second generation Pontiac Firebird was introduced in early 1970 by Pontiac for the 1970 model year.

== Overview ==
The second-generation debut for the 1970 model year was delayed until February 26, 1970, because of tooling and engineering problems; thus, its popular designation as a 1970½ model, while leftover 1969s were listed in early Pontiac literature without a model-year identification. This generation of Firebird was available in coupe form only; after the 1969 model year, convertibles were not available until 1989.

The first generation’s "Coke bottle" curves were replaced with a less defined, smoother body style, with a very few traditional elements retained. The top of the rear window line went almost straight down to the lip of the trunk lid. The new design was initially had a large B-pillar similar to the second generation Camaro that shared the platform, until 1975 when a larger "wraparound" rear window was added. It was intended to be part of the original design, but problems with the glue and sealing the rear window led to the flat style window being used until the body was re-designed in 1975. This wraparound style became the look that was to epitomize the F-body styling for the longest period during the Firebird's lifetime.

Models

- Firebird
- Firebird Esprit
- Firebird Formula
- Firebird Trans Am

Special/Limited Editions and appearance packages

- Formula appearance package (RPO W50, 1976–1981)
- 50th Anniversary limited edition (2,590 units, RPO Y82, 1976)
- Special Edition appearance package, black with gold pinstriping (RPO Y82 1977–1978, RPO Y84 1978–1981)
- Sky Bird Esprit appearance package (RPO W60, 1977–1978)
- Red Bird Esprit appearance package (RPO W68, 1978–1979)
- Yellow Bird Esprit appearance package (RPO W73, 1980)
- Special Edition appearance package, gold with brown pinstriping (8,666 units, RPO Y88, 1978)
- 10th Anniversary Trans Am (TATA) limited edition (7,500 units, RPO Y89, 1979)
- Turbo Trans Am Indianapolis pace car limited edition (5,700 units, RPO Y85, 1980)
- Turbo Trans Am "Daytona 500" pace car limited edition (2,000 units, RPO Y85, 1981)
- Macho Trans Am (offered by the Mecham Pontiac dealership in Glendale, AZ) (~400 units, 1977–1980).
- Fire Am (Firebird American) offered by Herb Adams/VSE (~200 units, 1976–1981)

=== 1970 ===
The first year of the second generation Firebird began offering a wider array of model subtypes and marked the appearance of the Firebird Esprit, and the Firebird Formula. The Firebird Esprit was offered as a luxury model that came with appearance options, the deluxe interior package, and a Pontiac 350 as standard equipment. The Formula was advertised as an alternative to the Trans Am and could be ordered with all the options available to the Trans Am with the exception of the fender flares, shaker scoop, and fender heat extractors.

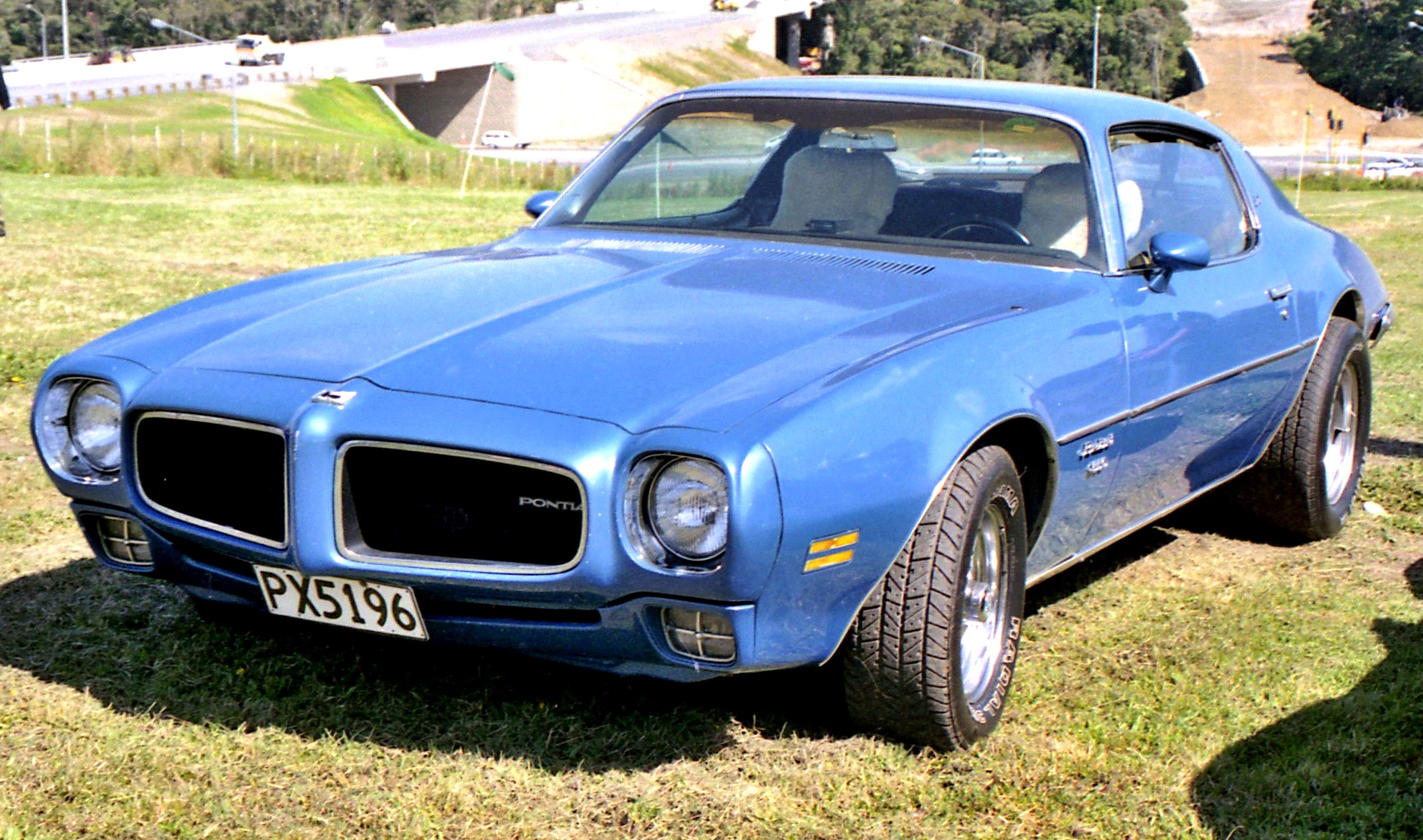
1970 Pontiac Firebird

The base model Firebird came equipped with a 155 hp (116 kW) 250 cu in (4.1 L) inline-six. The Firebird Esprit and the Firebird Formula came standard with the 255 hp (190 kW) 350 cu in (5.7 L). The Esprit could be upgraded to a two barrel carbureted 400 cu in (6.6 L)265 hp (198 kW), while the Formula could be optioned to receive the L78 4 barrel 400 that produced 330 hp (250 kW) or the L74 Ram Air III 400 345 hp (257 kW).

There were two Ram Air 400 cu in (6.6 L) engines available for the 1970 Trans Am: the 335 hp (250 kW) L74 Ram Air III 400 (366 hp (273 kW) in the GTO) and the 345 hp (257 kW) L67 Ram Air IV (370 hp (280 kW) in the GTO) that were carried over from 1969. The Ram Air IV was exclusive to the Trans Am, and could not be ordered on any of the lower Firebird models. The difference between the GTO and Firebird engines was that the secondary carburetor's throttle linkage had a restrictor which prevented the rear barrels from opening completely, but adjusting the linkage could allow full carburetor operation resulting in identical engine performance.

For the 1970 and 1971 model years, all Firebirds equipped with radios had the antennae mounted "in-glass" in the windshield.

=== 1971 ===
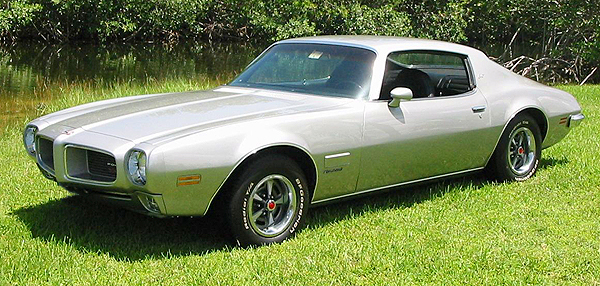
1971 Pontiac Firebird Esprit

The 1971 model year had a few minor changes to the Firebird. Fenders across all models now featured a one-year-only exhaust vent seen on the lower half of the fenders. The interior options also changed to the newer style collared bucket seats in the deluxe interior, and the previous year's seats with the headrest were no longer available. The rear seat console was introduced as an option, and Honeycomb wheels became available for all Firebirds.

1971 saw changes to the way the engines were rated from the factory. GM mandated that engines no longer use SAE Gross horsepower ratings and use the SAE Net power ratings to help alleviate the rising cost of insurance for performance vehicles. The compression ratio was also lowered for some of the models, de-tuning the power rating for some of the engines as part of new requirements for low-leaded fuels, however, the engine options remained mostly unchanged from 1970. As the limit for the compression ratio was lowered, this allowed for larger displacement engines to become available. The 455 was now available for the Firebird in two configurations. The 455 engine was available in the L75 325 hp (242 kW) version and the LS5 335 hp (250 kW) HO version. Both the 455 and 455 HO were available as engine options for the Firebird Formula, but the Trans Am received the 455 HO as standard equipment.

=== 1972 ===
During a 1972 strike, the Firebird (and the similar F-body Camaro) were nearly dropped.

The 1972 model year saw minor changes. A difference that differentiates a 1972 Firebird from the other 1970-73 Firebirds is the hexagonal honeycomb grille insert on the nose of the vehicle.

Engine options remained mostly unchanged, however, the L75 455 engine was dropped, but the LS5 455 HO remained as an option for the Formula and standard for the Trans Am. Pontiac advertised the 1972 455 HO as de-tuned to 300 hp, but the engine was unchanged from 1971.

Starting in 1972, and continuing until 1977, the Firebird was only produced at the Norwood, Ohio, facility.

=== 1973 ===
In 1973, the Trans Am added two new colors, Buccaneer Red and Brewster Green. Other exterior upgrades included the updated more modern nose bird. The new hood bird was option "RPO WW7 Hood Decal", a $55 option exclusive to Trans Am. The "Trans Am" decals were larger than previous versions and shared the same accent color schemes as the hood bird.

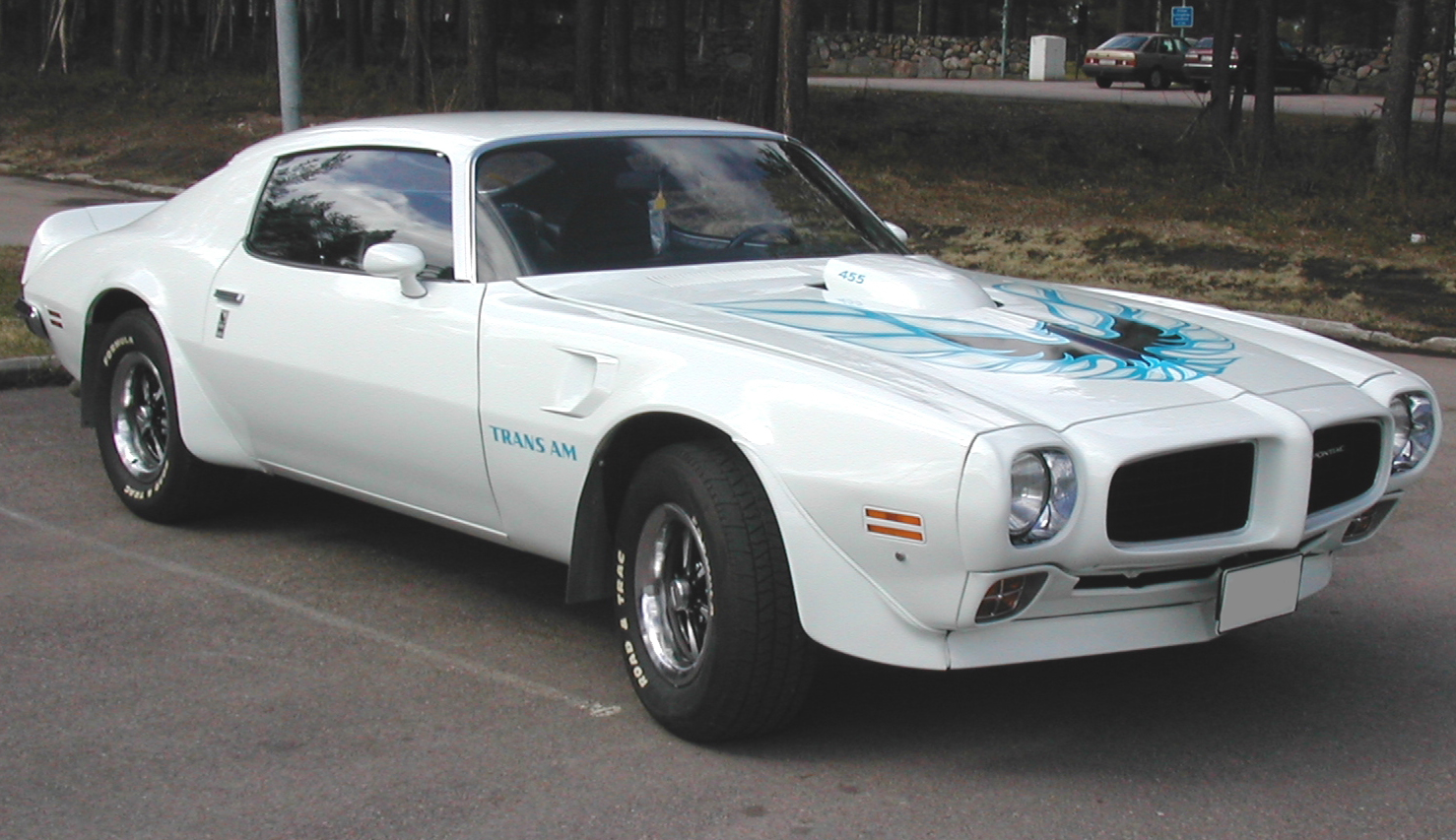
1973 Pontiac Firebird Trans Am

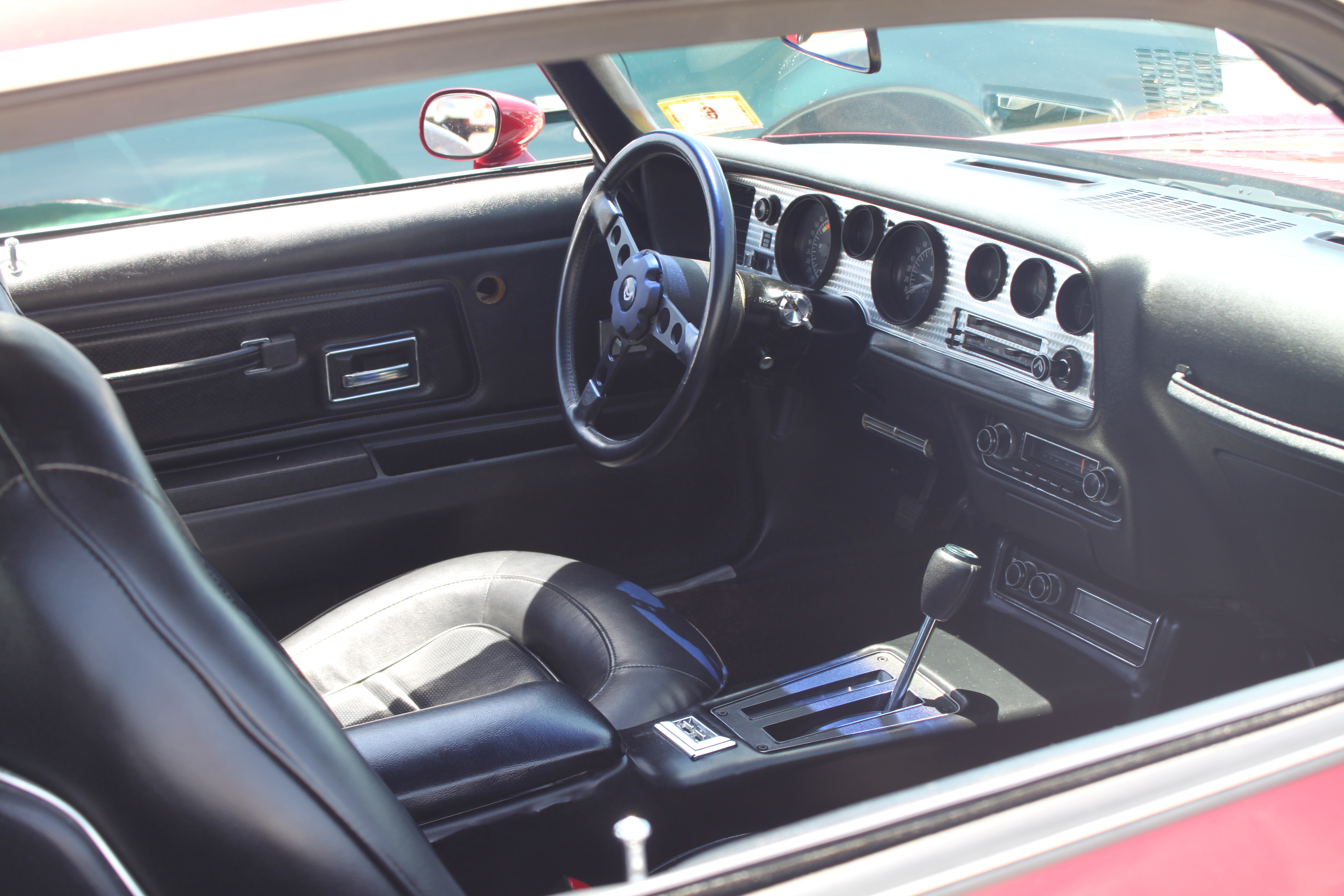
1973 Pontiac Firebird Trans Am interior

Inside the 1973, Firebird the standard interior equipment was almost the same as prior years. The new "Horse Collar" optional custom interior featured new seat coverings and door panels. The 1973 Firebird also had to meet the new safety and emissions requirements for 1973. There were extra steel reinforcements in the bumper and core support to the fender.

The 1973 Trans Am engine displaced 455 cubic inches in the base L75 and the Super Duty LS2 option. The base 455 produced 40 fewer horsepower than the round port Super Duty 455. Horsepower for the base L75 455 was rated at 250 at 4,000 rpm and 370 lb/ft at 2,800 rpm. Pontiac removed the H.O. designation from the base engine, and simply decaled the now non-functioning shaker with "455".

The "all hand-assembled" LS2 SD455 engine was rated at 290 at 4,000 rpm and 395 lb/ft at 3,600 rpm. All Pontiac engines included a new EGR system, which delayed the SD-455 program until late into the production year. The shaker decal on the scoop read "SD-455".

The 1973 Trans Am introduced "Radial Tuned Suspension". When ordered, it included 15-inch radial tires. This delivered a more comfortable ride while also providing better cornering.

The 1973 Trans Am production was up over previous years, the L75 455 production was 3,130 with automatic and 1,420 with manual transmission. The special ordered $550 Option LS2 SD-455 production saw 180 automatics and 72 manuals.

=== 1974 ===
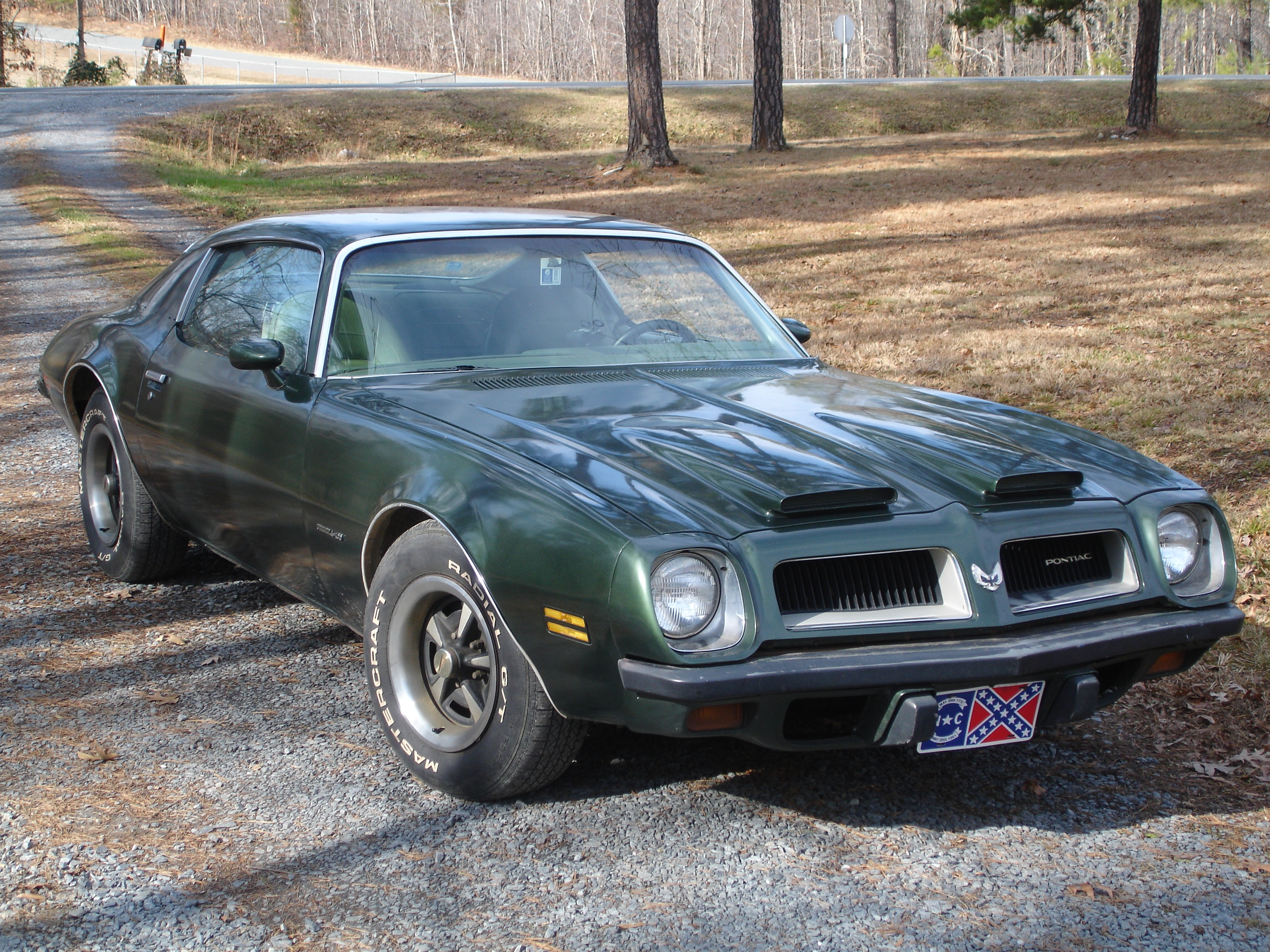
1974 Pontiac Firebird Formula

Curb weights rose dramatically in the 1974 model year because of the implementation of 5 mph (8.0 km/h) telescoping bumpers and various other crash- and safety-related structural enhancements; SD455 Trans Ams weighed in at 3,850 lb (1,746 kg) in their first year of production (1974 model year; actually 1973).

The 1974 models featured a redesigned "shovel-nose" front end and new wide "slotted" taillights. The 400, 455, and SD-455 engines were offered in the Trans Am and Formula models during 1974. A June 1974 test of a newly delivered, privately owned SD-455 Trans Am appeared in Super Stock and Drag Illustrated. With an unmodified car and a test weight of 4,010 lbs the testers clocked 14.25 seconds at 101 mph. The car had an automatic and A/C. Also, the factory rating of 290 hp was listed at 4,400 rpm while the factory tachometer has a 5,750 rpm redline. A production line stock 1974 SD455 produced 253 rear wheel HP on a chassis dyno, as reported by High Performance Pontiac magazine (January 2007). This is also consistent with the 290 SAE net horsepower factory rating (as measured at the crankshaft).

A 1974 Firebird was driven by Jim Rockford in the pilot movie and the first season (1974–1975) of The Rockford Files; every following season, Rockford would change to the next model year. However, in the sixth season (1979–1980), Rockford continued to drive the 1978 Firebird from season five, as the star, James Garner, disliked the 1979 model's restyled front end. The cars in the show were badged as lower-tier Esprit models but were Formulas with the twin-scoop hood replaced with a scoopless one. Another hint was the twin exhausts and rear anti-roll bars that were not used on the Esprit.

=== 1975 ===
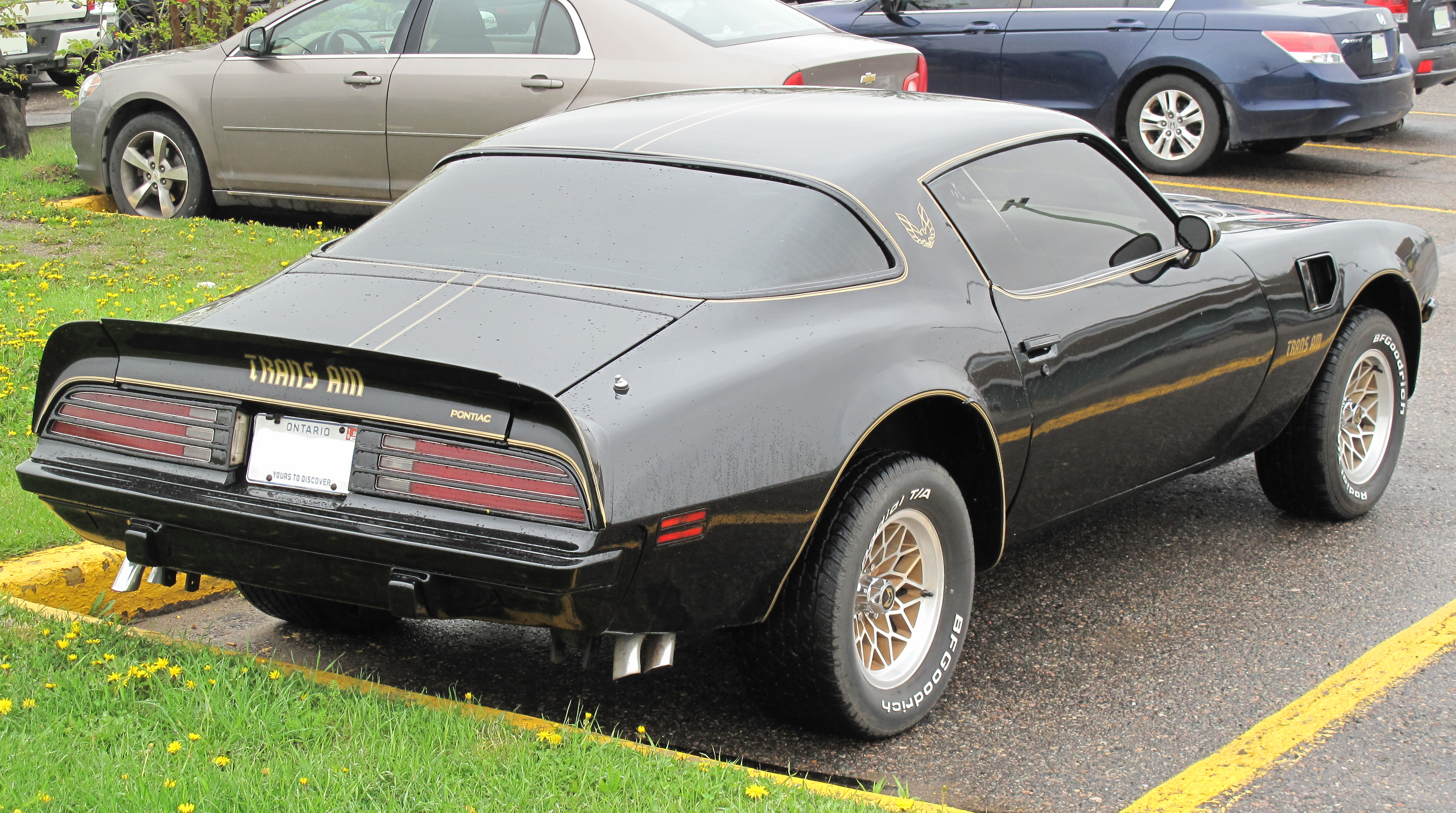
1975 Pontiac Firebird Trans Am rear

The 1975 models featured new wraparound rear windows that curved out to occupy more of the B-pillars, but the rear body shape and bumper remained unchanged. The turn signals were moved up from the valance panel to the grills, which helped distinguish the 1975 from the 1974 front end, as they are otherwise similar. This was also the last year of the larger-profile, larger-snout Formula hood for the Firebird Formula.

The Super Duty engine and TurboHydramatic 400 three-speed automatic were no longer available in 1975. Due to the use of catalytic converters starting in 1975, the TH400 would not fit alongside the catalytic converter underneath the vehicle. The smaller TurboHydramatic 350 automatic was deemed suitable as the power output for the engine had significantly decreased from the earlier years. TH350 drew less power and also did not require an electronic kickdown system. The Pontiac L78 400 was standard in the Trans Am and the 455 was optional for both 1975 and 1976 models.

1975 also saw the start of the "500577" cast 400 engine blocks enter production. The 500577 cast blocks were considered a weaker cast, as they had a lower nickel content, had metal shaved off in the lower journals of the block to decrease the overall weight, cost, and emissions to meet the tightening smog restrictions. These blocks were used until the W72 engine reverted to the original specifications from the start of the decade with the 481988 cast in late 1977.

Originally, the L75 455 7.5L V8 was dropped entirely, but it returned mid-year, available only with a four-speed Borg Warner Super T-10, and it was no longer available for the Formula. Although it was brought back as the "455 HO", it was not the same engine as the 1971-72 LS2 455 HO seen in the earlier Firebirds. It was a standard D-port engine with a low profile camshaft and restrictive exhaust system that was also seen in the larger body Pontiac platforms. Power output was restricted to 200 HP with a torque rating of 330 lb⋅ft at 2,000 rpm. It was the largest displacement "performance" engine still available. Track testing in 1975 showed the 455 capable of 16.12 second quarter-mile time, which was similar to the L82 Corvette.

=== 1976 ===
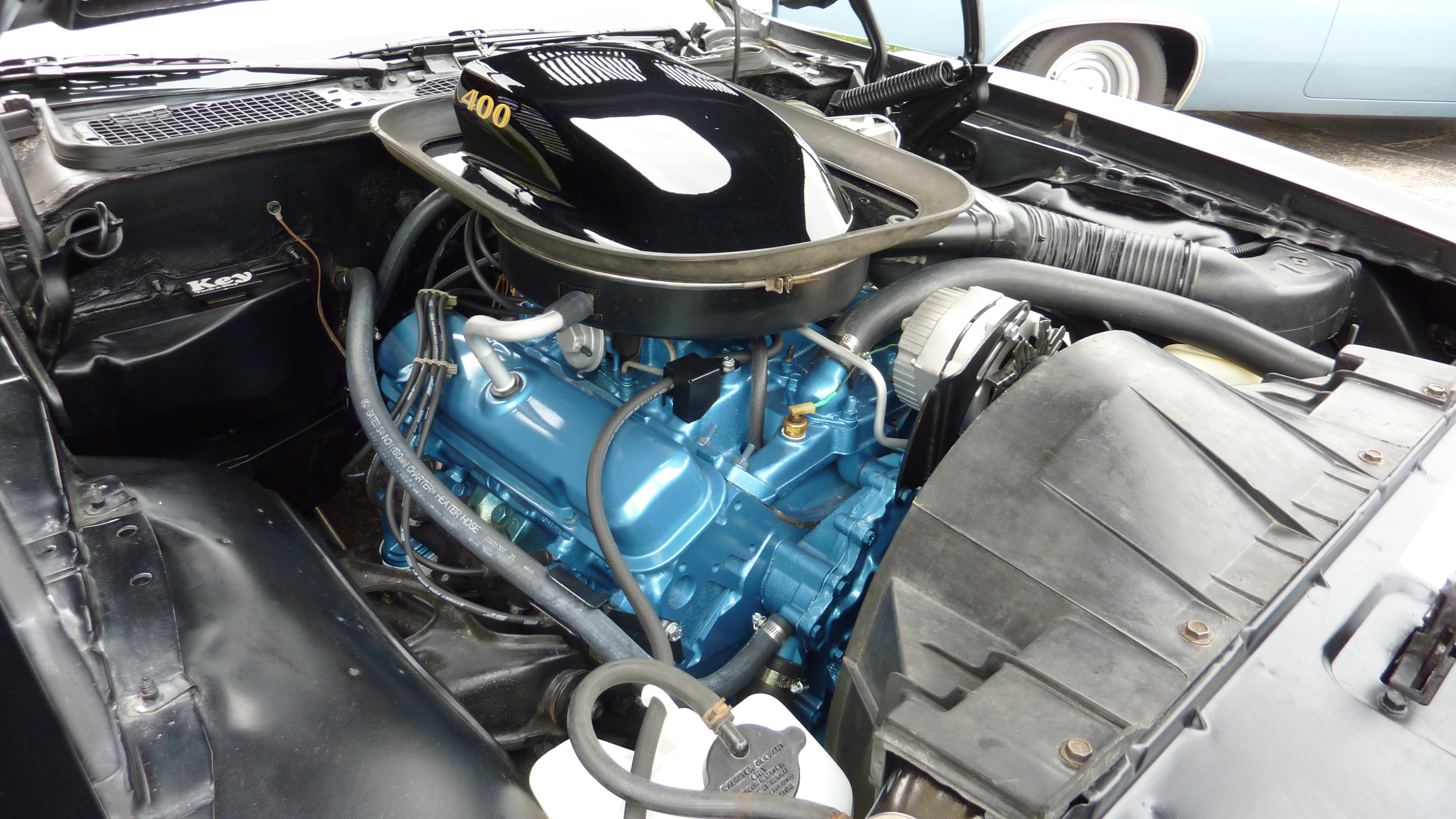
A 1976 Pontiac L78 400CID V8

Pontiac celebrated its 50th anniversary year in 1976. To commemorate this event, Pontiac unveiled a special Trans Am option at the 1976 Chicago Auto Show. Painted in black with gold accents, this was the first "anniversary" Trans Am package and the first production black and gold special edition. A removable T-top developed by Hurst was set to be included on all Y82 LE T/As, but proved problematic in installation and quality control, leading some Y82s to not be delivered with the Hurst T-top roof. All Hurst T-top equipped cars were built at the Norwood, Ohio, factory. It became an available option for other Firebirds in 1977.

1976 marked the end of the Pontiac L75 7.5 liter 455 V8, as it could no longer meet the tightening emissions restrictions and the "HO" moniker used the year prior was dropped. The L75 was only available with a four-speed manual Borg Warner Super T-10, and was exclusive to the Trans Am.

1976 also introduced the "W50 appearance package" for the Formula model line, consisting of a two-tone appearance package with lower accents across the bottom of the body, a large "Formula" decal across the bottom of each door, and a "Firebird" decal on the rear spoiler.

=== 1977 ===
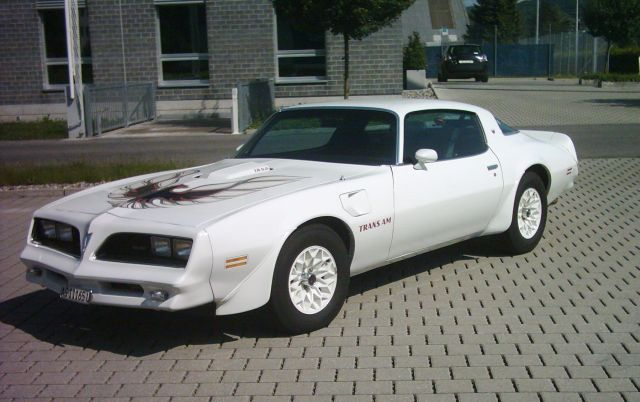
A 1977 Pontiac Firebird Trans Am with an early low-profile shaker.

The 1977 Firebird received a facelift that featured four rectangular headlamps. The shaker scoop was also revised for this year, with the early 1977-built T/As coming with off-center, lower-profile shaker scoops. The Formula hood was changed for the last time for the second generation with a much lower profile. The snowflake wheel became an option for all Firebirds and was standard with the Y82 appearance package, although it could be replaced with Rally II wheels as a credit option.

For the Esprit, an optional appearance package RPO W60 called the "Skybird appearance package" became available, featuring an all blue exterior and interior. This package was originally slated to be called the "Bluebird" similar to the "Yellowbird" and "Redbird" packages to follow in the upcoming model years, but the name was already in use for a company that produced school buses.

In 1977, General Motors began to source a larger selection of V8 engines to supply in the lower model Firebirds, and the Oldsmobile 350/403 V8, as well as the Chevrolet 305/350 V8, became options for the Firebird, Esprit, and Formula after June 1977. Previously, the Chevrolet inline-six was the only outsourced engine in a Firebird. Pontiac made the 301 (4.9 L) V8 available for order in the lower Firebird models, but due to such high demand and popularity, they removed its availability from the Firebird model to allow enough 301 engines for the other Pontiac lines. It was re-introduced as an option in 1979 as production for the 400 ceased and tooling was converted over to the 301.

The Trans Am had now three different engine options, the standard Pontiac L78 400, the optional extra cost Pontiac W72 400, and the Oldsmobile-sourced L80 403. 1977 also saw the cubic inch metrics on the shaker dropped in favor of the displacement of the cylinders. The shakers had a "6.6 Litre" decal for all L78 Pontiac 400 and L80 Oldsmobile 403 engines. Only the optional W72 Pontiac 400 received the "T/A 6.6" decal.

As Pontiac had discontinued the 455 in the previous model year, a modified 400 Pontiac V8 dubbed the "T/A 6.6" RPO W72 with a single four-barrel 800CFM Rochester Quadrajet carburettor rated at 200 bhp (203 PS; 149 kW) at 3,600 rpm and a maximum torque of 325 lb⋅ft (441 N⋅m) at 2,400 rpm, as opposed to the regular "6.6 Litre" 400 (RPO L78) rated at 180 hp (134 kW). The T/A 6.6 equipped engines had chrome valve covers, while the base 400 engines had painted valve covers. For 1977, the W72 shared the same air cleaner and shared the same 500577 cast block as the L78, but received the 6x4 heads, whereas the L78 only received the 6x8 heads. The 6x4 heads were used on early Pontiac 350 blocks that helped increase the compression, and also had hardened valve seats for a higher RPM operating range.

The Oldsmobile 403 was implemented as the 400 Pontiac could not satisfy emissions requirements for high-altitude states and California. Wanting to still offer a 6.6 litre option for the Trans Am, the 403 Olds was seen as a suitable replacement as when equipped with an A.I.R emissions system, it could satisfy the emissions criteria for these states and still offer the power ratings expected of the Trans Am. The L80 Oldsmobile 403 V8 had slightly more power than the standard L78 Pontiac 400 at 185 hp (138 kW) and offered the same low-end torque of 320 lb⋅ft (430 N⋅m) at a more usable operating range of 2,200rpm.

From 1977 to 1981, the Firebird used four square headlamps, while the Camaro continued to retain the two round headlights that had been shared by both second-generation designs. The 1977 Trans-Am special edition became famous after being featured in Smokey and the Bandit. The 1980 turbo model was used for Smokey and the Bandit II.

=== 1978 ===
Changes for 1978 were slight, with a switch from a honeycomb to a crosshatch pattern grille being the most notable change to the body style. The decals for the standard Trans Ams changed from the "looping style" lettering to the "block-style" font that would remain on the Firebird until the end of the second generation. T-tops in 1978 transitioned from Hurst units to Fisher (GM) in mid-year. Pontiac also introduced the Red Bird package on the Firebird Esprit model. Painted in Roman red with a matching deluxe red interior, it demonstrated gold accents with a unique Red Bird graphic on the b-pillars. It also included a Formula steering wheel with gold spokes and gold dash bezel, similar to the ones included in the Special Edition package, however, the red and gold steering wheel was exclusive to the Red Bird Esprit.

The W72 engine option also saw a revision to the camshaft duration and the tuning of the Rochester Quadrajet which lead to a 10% increase of horsepower from the following year, bringing the total to 220 hp. Additionally, the earlier stronger and more durable 481988 cast block returned on the W72, denoted with a large "XX" cast protruding off the side of the block near the cast code. The WS6 special performance package developed by Herb Adams was introduced as a handling option for the Trans Am, including a larger diameter rear sway bar, tighter ratio steering box, 15x8-inch snowflake wheels, additional frame bracing, as well as other suspension changes. Delays in manufacturing prevented the rear disc brake (RPO J65) from being available on the 1978 model year. Approximately 23.1% (28,239) of Formulas and Trans Ams in 1978 had the WS6 option according to Pontiac sales information at the start of 1979. At the end of 1978, the WS6 handling package became available for the Formula models as well.

=== 1979 ===
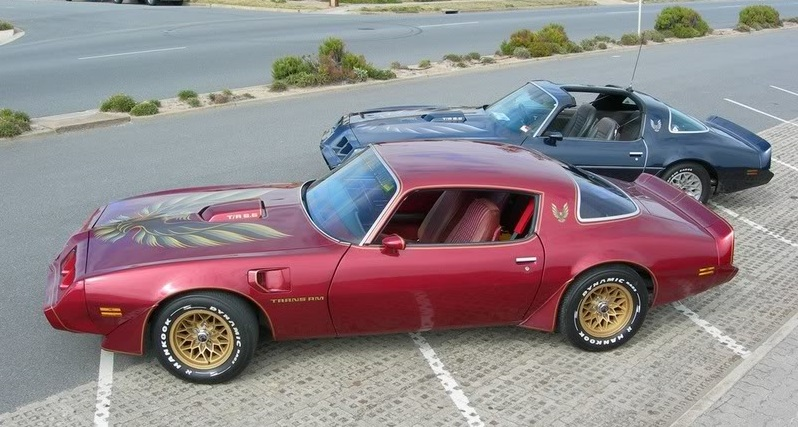
Two late '70s Trans Ams, in T-top and hardtop versions. Note: No Firebird was ever offered factory in Right Hand Drive Configuration

The front end was restyled for 1979, which also marked the 10th anniversary of the Trans Am. For 1979, there were three possible engine options. The L80 Oldsmobile 403ci engine became the standard and was only available with the TH350 3-speed automatic. The W72 was available for a short period and in limited supply. This was the last of the line for the Pontiac large displacement V8 engines, and only available with the Borg-Warner Super T-10, also requiring the WS6 handling package as mandatory equipment in conjunction with this driveline choice. A credit option with a four-speed transmission was the smaller displacement Pontiac L37 301 4.9 liter V8 and it came with either the ST-10 or TH350.

A limited-edition anniversary package was made available: platinum silver paint with charcoal gray upper paint accents, mirrored T-top panels, a special interior featuring silver leather seats with custom-embroidered Firebird emblems and aircraft-inspired red lighting for the gauges. The 10th-anniversary cars also featured special 10th-anniversary decals, including a Firebird hood decal that extended off of the hood and onto the front fenders. Pontiac produced 7,500 10th anniversary cars, of which 1,817 were equipped with the high-output Pontiac T/A 6.6 W72 400 engine. Two 10th anniversary Trans Ams were the actual pace cars for the 1979 Daytona 500, which has been called the race that made NASCAR. Car and Driver magazine named the Trans Am with the WS6 performance package the best handling car of 1979. During period dyno testing, the National Hot Rod Association rated the limited-availability T/A 6.6 high-output Pontiac 400 engine at 260–280 net horsepower, which was significantly higher than Pontiac's conservative rating of 220 hp. In 1979 Pontiac sold 116,535 Trans Ams, the highest sold in a year.

=== 1980 ===
In 1980, ever-increasing emissions restrictions led Pontiac to drop all of its large-displacement engines. 1980 therefore saw the biggest engine changes for the Trans Am. The 301, offered in 1979 as a credit option, was now the standard engine. No manual transmission was available for the Formula or Trans Am in 1980, all received the 3-speed automatic Turbo Hydramatic 350. Engine options included a turbocharged 301 or the Chevrolet 305 small block. The turbocharged 301 used a Garrett TB305 turbo attached to a single Rochester Quadrajet four-barrel carburetor and featured a hood-mounted "boost" gauge that would light up as the TB305 accumulated boost. The hood of the 301T equipped Firebirds had a large offset bulge to accommodate for the mounting position of the carburetor on the engine as the turbocharger exhaust occupied a large amount of space in the engine bay. The 301T equipped T/A's were restricted to an automatic transmission and a 3.08 rear differential ratio.

A 1980 Turbo Trans Am was featured in the movie Smokey and the Bandit II, but was fitted with nitrous oxide tanks by Marvin Miller Systems to get the desired performance.

=== 1981 ===
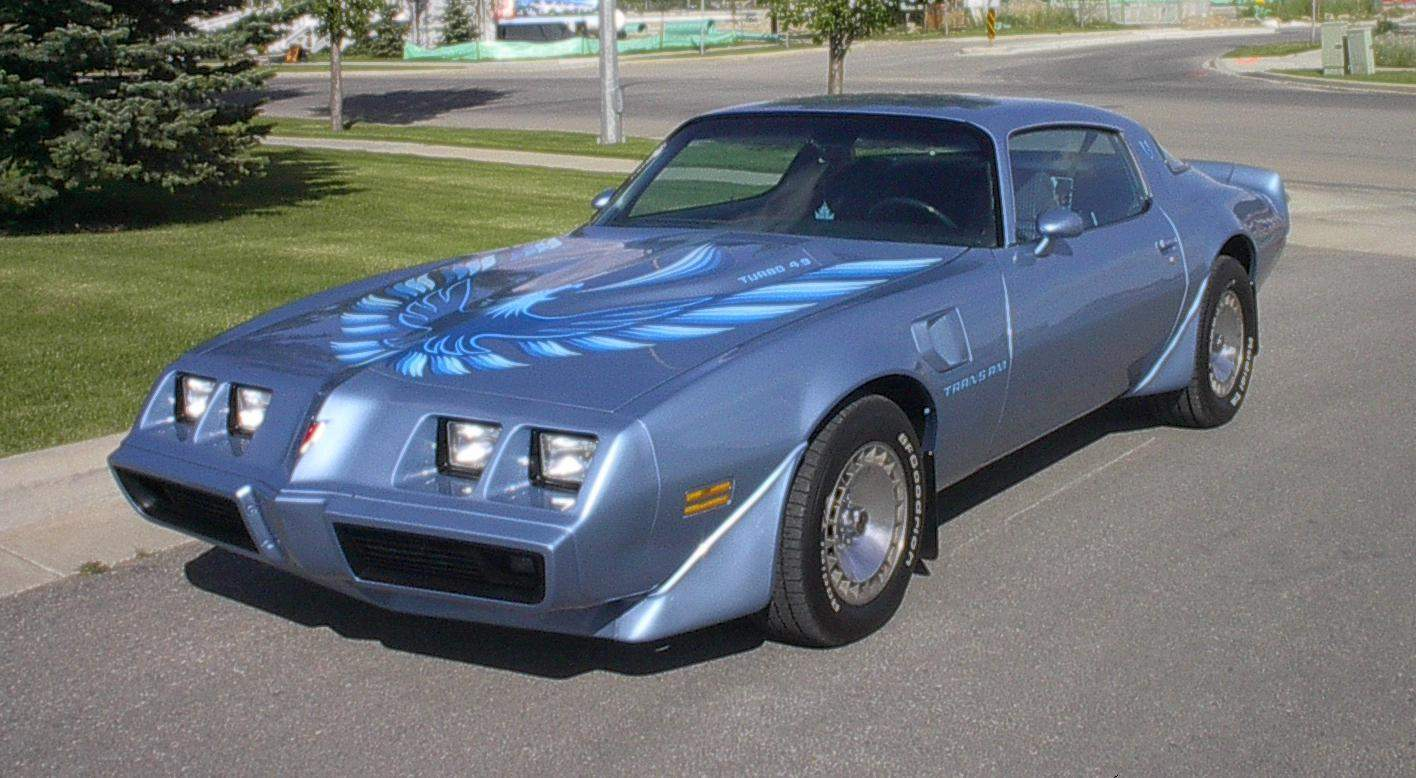
1981 Pontiac Firebird Turbo Trans Am

1981 became the final year for the second generation Pontiac Firebird. The three engine options were unchanged for the model line-up, however, the option for a four-speed Borg Warner Super T-10 was re-introduced for the Formula and Trans Am, but was only available with the Chevrolet sourced LG4 305 5.0 liter V8. As with all other General Motors vehicles for 1981, all engines came equipped with the "computer command control" system attached to the carburetor.

The hood decal for the 1981 model year was also slightly restyled. All Firebirds also received an embossed silver Firebird decal on the petrol tank cap attached to the rear taillights. On the special edition Trans Ams, this Firebird was gold.

The G80 limited-slip differential that was previously standard for the last decade on all Trans Ams became a pay-extra option. This decision was made by Pontiac to prepare dealers for the new ordering and pricing for the third generation Firebird where the G80 was no longer being included as a standard option for the Trans Am.

=== Engines ===
1970	L22 250 cu in (4.1 L) Chevrolet I6; 155 hp (116 kW)	L30 350 cu in (5.7 L) Pontiac V8; 255 hp (190 kW)	L65 400 cu in (6.6 L) Pontiac V8; 265 hp (198 kW)	L78 400 cu in (6.6 L) Pontiac V8; 330 hp (250 kW)	L74 400 cu in (6.6 L) Pontiac Ram Air III V8; 335 hp (250 kW) (automatic); 345 hp (257 kW) (manual)	LS1 400 cu in (6.6 L) Pontiac Ram Air IV V8; 345 hp (257 kW) (automatic); 370 hp (280 kW) (manual)	
1971 (Note: In 1971, GM changed from rating brake horsepower, which is measured at the engine, to net horsepower, measured at the wheels.)	L22 250 cu in Chevrolet I6; 110 hp (82 kW)	L30 350 CID Pontiac V8; 165 hp (123 kW)	L65 400 cu in Pontiac V8; 180 hp (130 kW)	L78 400 cu in Pontiac V8; 250 hp (190 kW)	L75 455 cu in (7.5 L) Pontiac V8; 255 hp (190 kW)	LS5 455 cu in Pontiac "H.O." Ram Air IV V8; 305 hp (227 kW)	
1972	L22 250 cu in Chevrolet I6; 110 hp (82 kW)	L30 350 cu in Pontiac V8; 175 hp (130 kW)	L65 400 cu in Pontiac V8; 200 hp (150 kW)	L78 400 cu in Pontiac V8; 250 hp (190 kW)		LS5 455 cu in Pontiac "H.O." V8; 300 hp	
1973	L22 250 cu in Chevrolet I6; 100 hp (75 kW)	L30 350 cu in Pontiac V8; 150–175 hp (112–130 kW) (Note: The lower rating is for a car equipped with an automatic transmissions, the higher rating is for a car equipped with a manual transmission.)	L65 400 cu in Pontiac V8; 170–185 hp (127–138 kW)	L78 400 cu in Pontiac V8; 230 hp (170 kW)	L75 400 cu in (6.6 L) Pontiac V8; 250 hp	LS2 455 cu in Pontiac "SD" V8; 290–310 hp (220–230 kW) (Note: Early engines were rated at 310 hp but due to internal changes, primarily with the camshaft, the rating was dropped to 290 hp, these changes were made to meet emissions standards.)	
1974	L22 250 cu in Chevrolet I6; 100 hp (75 kW)	L30 350 cu in Pontiac V8; 155–170 hp (116–127 kW) (Note: The 170 hp engine was standard on the Esprit and Formula models.)	L65 400 cu in Pontiac V8; 190 hp (140 kW)	L78 400 cu in Pontiac V8; 200 hp	L75 400 cu in (6.6 L) Pontiac V8; 250 hp	LS2 455 cu in Pontiac "SD" V8; 290 hp (220 kW)	
1975	L22 250 cu in Chevrolet I6; 100 hp (75 kW)	L30 350 cu in Pontiac V8; 155 hp	L76 350 cu in Pontiac V8; 175 hp	L78 400 cu in Pontiac V8; 185 hp (138 kW)	L75 455 cu in Pontiac "H.O." V8; 200 hp (Note: Introduced midyear.)		
1976	L22 250 cu in Chevrolet I6; 100 hp (75 kW)	L30 350 cu in Pontiac V8; 160 hp (120 kW)	L76 350 cu in Pontiac V8; 165 hp (123 kW)	L78 400 cu in Pontiac V8; 185 hp (138 kW)	L75 455 cu in Pontiac "H.O." V8; 200 hp		
1977	LD5 231 cu in (3.8 L) Buick V6; 105 hp (78 kW)	L27 301 cu in (4.9 L) Pontiac V8; 135 hp (101 kW)	L76 350 cu in Pontiac V8; 170 hp (130 kW)	L34 350 cu in Oldsmobile V8; 170 hp	L78 400 cu in Pontiac V8; 180 hp (130 kW)	W72 400 cu in Pontiac V8; 200 hp	L80 403 cu in (6.6 L) Oldsmobile V8; 185 hp (138 kW)
1978	LD5 231 cu in (3.8 L) Buick V6; 105 hp (78 kW)		LG3 305 cu in (5.0 L) Chevrolet V8; 135 hp	LM1 350 cu in (5.7 L) Chevrolet V8 (Note: Chevrolet 350, VIN code "L", Buick 350, VIN code "X", and Oldsmobile 350, VIN code "R", enigines were all used.); 170 hp (130 kW)	L78 400 cu in Pontiac V8; 185 hp	W72 400 cu in Pontiac V8; 220 hp (160 kW)	L80 403 cu in (6.6 L) Oldsmobile V8; 185 hp (138 kW)
1979	LD5 231 cu in (3.8 L) Buick V6; 105 hp (78 kW)	L27 301 cu in (4.9 L) Pontiac V8; 135 hp	L37 301 cu in Pontiac V8; 150 hp	LG3 305 cu in Chevrolet V8; 135 hp or 150 hp	LM1 350 cu in Chevrolet V8; 170 hp	W72 400 cu in Pontiac V8; 220 hp (160 kW)	L80 403 cu in (6.6 L) Oldsmobile V8; 185 hp (138 kW)
1980	LD5 231 cu in (3.8 L) Buick V6; 105 hp (78 kW)	L37 301 cu in Pontiac V8; 140 hp (100 kW)	W72 301 cu in Pontiac E/C V8; 155 hp	LU8 301 cu in Pontiac Turbo V8; 210 hp (160 kW)	LG4 305 cu in Chevrolet V8; 150 hp (110 kW)		
1981	LD5 231 cu in (3.8 L) Buick V6; 105 hp (78 kW)	LS5 265 cu in (4.3 L) Pontiac V8; 140 hp (100 kW)	L37 301 cu in Pontiac E/C V8; 155 hp	LU8 301 cu in Pontiac Turbo V8; 210 hp (160 kW)	LG4 305 cu in Chevrolet V8; 150 hp (110 kW)		

=== Production totals ===
Model year	Base	Esprit	Formula	Trans Am	Total
1970	18,874	18,961	7,708	3,196	48,739
1971	23,021	20,185	7,802	2,116	53,125
1972	12,001	11,415	5,249	1,286	29,951
1973	14,096	17,249	10,166	4,802	46,313
1974	26,372	22,583	14,519	10,255	73,729
1975	22,293	20,826	13,670	27,274	84,063
1976	21,206	22,252	20,613	46,704	110,775
1977	30,642	34,548	21,801	68,744	155,735
1978	32,671	36,926	24,346	93,341	187,294
1979	38,642	30,853	24,850	117,108	211,453
1980	29,811	17,277	9,356	50,896	107,340
1981	20,541	10,938	5,927	33,493	70,899
