= Pontiac V8 engine =

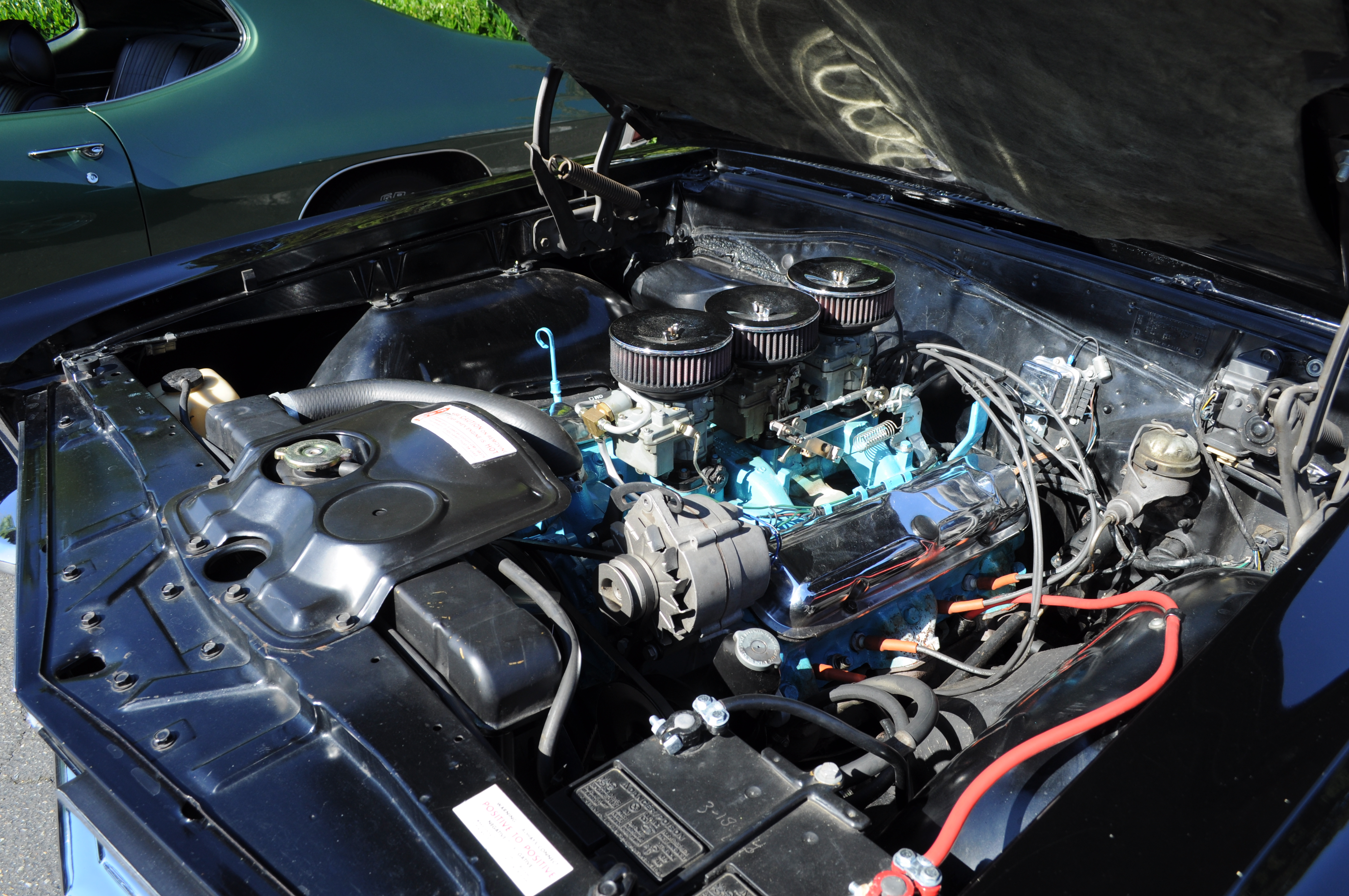
- 1965 Pontiac GTO Tri-Power 389 Trophy V8

Overview
- Manufacturer: Pontiac (General Motors)
- Also called: Strato Streak
- Production: 1955–1981 Pontiac Assembly (engine block and heads); Saginaw Metal Casting Operations

Layout
- Configuration: 90° V8
- Displacement: 265 cu in (4.3 L); 287 cu in (4.7 L); 301 cu in (4.9 L); 303 cu in (5.0 L); 317 cu in (5.2 L); 326 cu in (5.3 L); 347 cu in (5.7 L); 350 cu in (5.7 L); 370 cu in (6.1 L); 389 cu in (6.4 L); 400 cu in (6.6 L); 421 cu in (6.9 L); 428 cu in (7.0 L); 455 cu in (7.5 L)
- Cylinder bore: 3.72 in (94.5 mm); 3 3/4 in (95.3 mm); 3.78 in (96 mm); 3 7/8 in (98.4 mm); 3.9375 in (100.01 mm); 4 in (101.6 mm); 4 1/16 in (103.2 mm); 4 3/32 in (104 mm); 4.121 in (104.7 mm); 4.1525 in (105.47 mm); 4.342 in (110.3 mm)
- Piston stroke: 2.84 in (72.1 mm); 3 in (76.2 mm); 3 1/4 in (82.6 mm); 3.5625 in (90.49 mm)
- Cylinder block material: Cast iron
- Cylinder head material: Cast iron
- Valvetrain: OHV 2 valves per cyl.
- Compression ratio: 7.9:1, 8.0:1, 8.4:1, 8.5:1, 8.6:1, 8.9:1, 10.0:1, 10.25:1, 10.5:1, 10.75:1, 11.0:1

RPM range
- Max. engine speed: varies

Combustion
- Turbocharger: Garrett TBO-305 (in 301)
- Fuel system: Rochester or Carter carburetors Fuel injection
- Fuel type: Gasoline
- Cooling system: Water-cooled

Output
- Power output: 120–310 hp (89–231 kW) SAE (370 bhp)
- Torque output: 245–500 lb⋅ft (332–678 N⋅m)

Dimensions
- Dry weight: 550 to 650 lb (250 to 290 kg)

The Pontiac V8 engine is a family of overhead valve 90° V8 engines manufactured by the Pontiac Division of General Motors Corporation between 1955 and 1981. The engines feature a cast-iron block and head and two valves per cylinder. Engine block and cylinder heads were cast at Saginaw Metal Casting Operations then assembled at Tonawanda Engine before delivery to Pontiac Assembly for installation.

Initially marketed as a 287 cu in (4.7 L), it went on to be manufactured in displacements between 265 cu in (4.3 L) and 455 cu in (7.5 L). Typically carbureted, but a fuel injected and a turbocharged version were produced. In the 1960s the popular 389 cu in (6.4 L) version, which had helped establish the Pontiac GTO as a premier muscle car, was cut in half to produce an unusual, high-torque inline four economy engine, the Trophy 4.

Pontiac did not produce "small-block" and "big-block" V8 engine families common amongst other automakers. All Pontiac V8s shared a common 4.62" bore pitch, resulting in a mid-size block with external dimensions shared by all displacements (except the short deck versions). However, two main journal diameters were used: 3.00" for 400ci and smaller displacements, versus 3.25" for 421ci and larger displacements.

Pontiac engines were installed in its U.S.-market cars; Canadian-built Pontiac automobiles generally used Chevrolet engines. From 1955 through 1959, the Pontiac V8 was also used in some GMC pick-up trucks including the 1958/59 336 cubic-inch versions of the 370CI and 389CI engines.

Pontiac continued to manufacture its own V8 design, distinct from Buick, Cadillac, Chevrolet, or Oldsmobile, thru the 1970s.

In response to ever stricter EPA and CAFE regulations, Pontiac later downsized its V8, introducing a thin-wall short deck version in 1977.

Finally however, Federal regulations and GM's drive toward a "corporate" engine to be shared amongst all its divisions, brought the demise of the Pontiac V8 in 1981. It was replaced by GM "corporate engines" such as the Chevrolet 305 and the Oldsmobile 307 in the 1980s, and ultimately by the LS V8 introduced in 1997.

== History ==
Most Pontiac engines were painted light blue. Pontiac in the 1950s was one of a few US manufacturers that did not regularly identify their engine names and sizes with air-cleaner or valve-cover decals. The 1958 370" engine and the 1959–60 389 version was named the "Tempest" V-8 and changed in 61 to the "Trophy" V8.

Pontiac began as a "companion make" to the Oakland division of the General Motors line of automobiles in 1926. Pontiac successfully competed against more-expensive inline four-cylinder models with their inline flathead six-cylinder engines. After outselling Oakland, Pontiac became the sole survivor of the two by 1932. Pontiac used the Oakland V8 for one year (1932), before debuting their Pontiac straight-8 engine in 1933.

By 1946, engineers were considering new engine designs for postwar cars. It became evident that future styling requirements, coupled with prospects for improved fuels, necessitated the introduction of a more compact, more rigid engine, and an engineering program was initiated with those goals in mind.” Pontiac began work on a V8 configuration, but progress was slow, since the division's conservative management saw no immediate need to replace the Pontiac Straight-8 until later in the 1950s.

When Robert Critchfield took over as Pontiac general manager in 1952, he launched an ambitious plan to move Pontiac into the upscale, mid-range market occupied by Oldsmobile, and that demanded V8 power. Critchfield fast-tracked the V8 program, completing the new engine in a blistering 18 months. Despite the very short timeline, its relatively late start allowed it to take advantage of developments proven in the Oldsmobile V8 and Cadillac V8; as a result, the new Pontiac V8 was remarkably free of teething problems.

Pontiac had planned to introduce their new V8 in 1953 model cars, but Buick and Chevrolet appealed to GM management and obtained a two-year delay, so Pontiac had to wait until 1955 (Buick wanted the delay so that they could be the only GM division to introduce a new V8 engine in 1953, while Chevrolet did not want to be the only GM division without a V8 engine for 1954).

The 1954 concept car Pontiac Strato-Streak was used to introduce the new V8. Pontiac unveiled its production OHV "Strato Streak" V8 in 1955; it was the culmination of nine years of design and development work.

=== Development ===
By 1949, work on a Pontiac V8 had begun but moved along slowly. Engineers initially produced a 269-cubic-inch (4.4 L) L-head design, but when tested against an OHV Oldsmobile Rocket V8 downsized to a matching 270 cu in (4.4 L), the results showed Pontiac that an L-head simply could not compete with an overhead valve engine.

So, efforts were shifted to an OHV design. By 1952, Pontiac had 23 287 cu in (4.7 L) V8-equipped 1953 model production prototypes running tests on the GM proving grounds.

== Design ==
The Pontiac V8 that finally reached the public in 1955 was an overhead valve engine with a cast iron block, and cast iron cylinder heads with wedge-shaped combustion chambers. The main innovations of the Pontiac engine was reverse-flow cooling and the stamped rocker-arm system.

The innovative stamped rocker-arm system had been devised by Pontiac engineer Clayton Leach in 1948. The design mounted the rocker arms on ball-pivots set on studs in the cylinder head. Along with being simpler and thus cheaper to build, this allowed more consistent valve action with less weight and more reliability than conventional rocker shafts. At the request of Ed Cole, general manager of Chevrolet, the layout was also used by the Chevrolet V8 released in 1955, an exception to the customary GM policy of allowing a division one year of exclusive use of an internally developed advance. The design was subsequently utilized by nearly every OHV engine manufacturer.

All Pontiac V8s from 1955 to 1959 were reverse cooled, known as the "gusher" cooling system. It was removed from the design for the 1960 model year because designers moved the generator and the power steering pump from atop the front of the engine down to the front of the heads to accommodate lower hoodlines. However, the 1959 389 engines had the generator in front of the heads with reverse flow cooling still in use.

All Pontiac V8s shared a common 4.62" bore pitch, resulting in a mid-size block with external dimensions shared by all displacements (except the short deck versions). Most Pontiac V8s had an overall length (to the edge of the water pump pulley) of 28.25 in (718 mm), an overall width of 27 in (690 mm), and a height (not including air cleaner) of 31 in (790 mm). Dry weight ranged from 590 to 650 pounds (270 to 290 kg), depending on displacement and year.

To maintain strength, Pontiac engineers scaled up the V8s main journal diameters internally as displacement and strokes increased and manufacturing method changed. The 1955 287ci and 1956 316ci were given 2.5" diameter journals. For the 1957 347ci and 1958 370ci, journals were enlarged to 2.263". From 1959 forward, 3" journals were used for 400ci and smaller displacements, versus 3.25" for 421ci and larger displacements (except the short-deck 265/301 returned to the original 2.5" diameter journal).

Those early cranks (1955–1958) were forged. From 1959 to 1966, cranks were cast with Armasteel™ (a GM pearlitic malleable cast iron). From 1967 onward (through the end of production in 1982), Pontiac V8s used nodular (ductile) cast iron crankshafts.

The deck height of most Pontiac V8s is 10.24 inches. However, Pontiac did produce three "short-deck" exceptions; 265/301 blocks were sliced down by exactly 1 inch to 9.24 inches, and the 1969 Race 303 block was ~8.24 inches.

Pontiac V8s share the same 6.625 in (168.3 mm) connecting rod length, with the exceptions of the short deck versions.

== Small-journal engines:1955–1981 ==
=== 287 ===
The V8 engine was introduced for the 1955 model year as the "Strato Streak". Not long before the model year introduction, Pontiac management decided that the entire line would be V8-powered. This was based on results of over 1 million test miles, which was unheard of at the time. The 287 was an "oversquare" engine with a bore and stroke of 3 3/4 in × 3 1/4 in (95.3 mm × 82.6 mm), for a total displacement of 287.2 cu in (4.7 L) and a main bearing diameter of 2.5 inches. Compression ratio was a modest 8.00:1, with valve diameters of 1.781 in (45.2 mm) (intake) and 1 1/2 in (38 mm) (exhaust). It was rated 180 hp (134 kW) at 4600 rpm and 264 lb⋅ft (358 N⋅m) at 2400 rpm with a two-barrel carburetor, 200 hp (149 kW) at 4600 rpm and 278 lb⋅ft (377 N⋅m) at 2800 rpm with the four-barrel carburetor.

=== 317 ===
For 1956 the V8 was bored out to 3.9375 in (100.01 mm), increasing displacement to 316.6 cu in (5.2 L). A factory 285HP version was built specifically for NASCAR competition, and soon offered as an optional engine in the following forms:

(with manual transmission)

- Two-barrel carburetor, 7.9:1 compression, 192 hp (143 kW) at 4400 rpm, 297 lb⋅ft (403 N⋅m) at 2800 rpm
- Four-barrel carburetor, 8.9:1 compression, 216 hp (161 kW) at 4800 rpm, 315 lb⋅ft (427 N⋅m) at 2800 rpm
- Dual Four-Barrel carburetor, 10.0:1 compression, 285 hp at 5100 rpm, 330 lbft at 3600 rpm.

(with Hydramatic automatic )

- Two-barrel carburetor, 8.9:1 compression, 205 hp (153 kW) at 4600 rpm, 294 lb⋅ft (399 N⋅m) at 2600 rpm
- Four-barrel carburetor, 8.9:1 compression, 227 hp (169 kW) at 4800 rpm, 312 lb⋅ft (423 N⋅m) at 3000 rpm
- Two four-barrel carburetors, 10.0:1 compression, 285 hp (213 kW) at 5100 rpm, 330 lb⋅ft (447 N⋅m) at 3600 rpm.

=== 347 ===
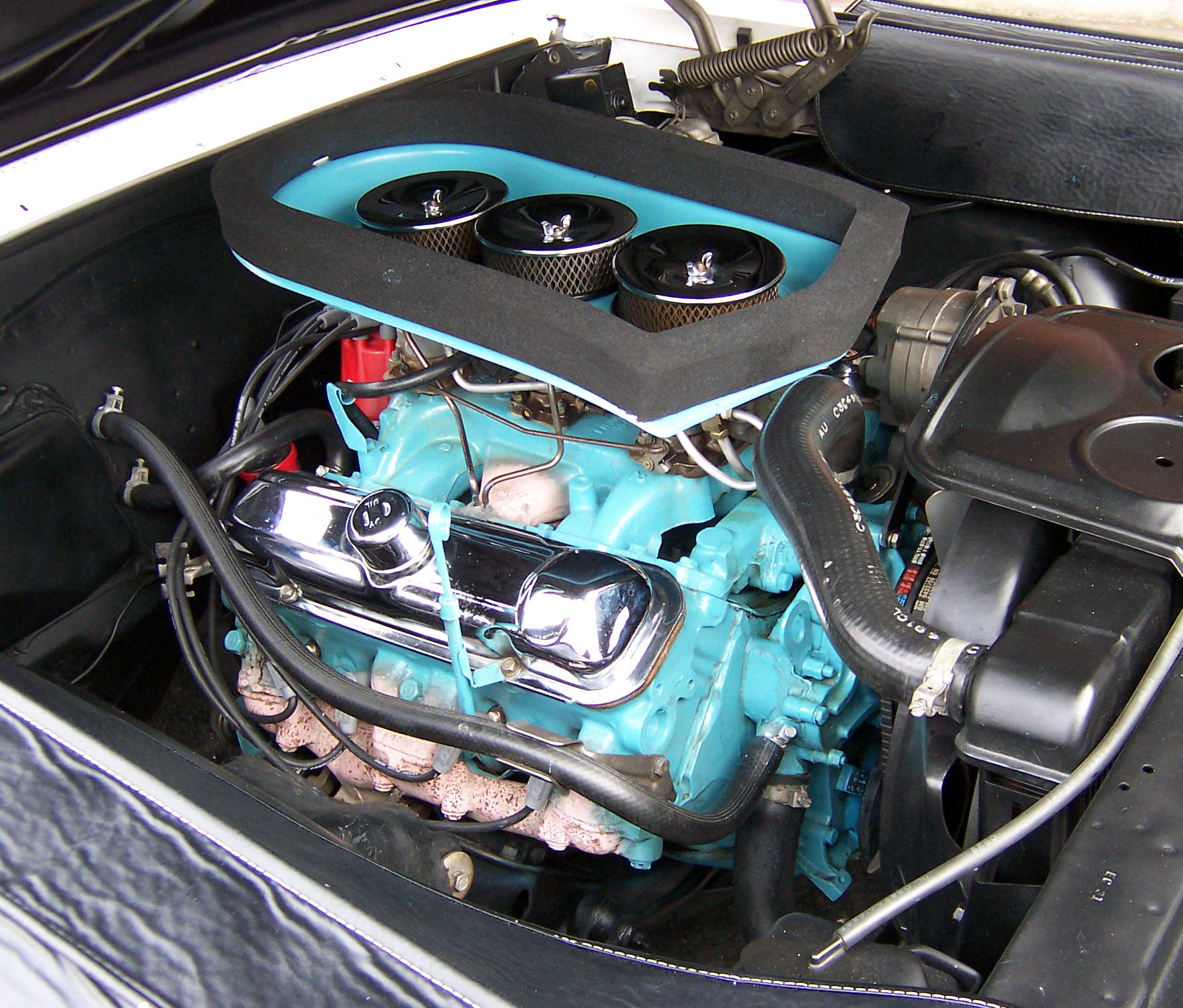
Pontiac V8 engine with triple two-barrel Tri-Power carburetor setup

For 1957 the V8's stroke was increased to 3.5625 in (90.49 mm), for a displacement of 347 cu in (5.7 L) and the main bearing size was increased to 2.625. For the first time, Pontiac offered Tri-Power, three two-barrel carburetors with a sequential linkage (replacing the previous dual-quad set-up). Power ratings increased with the increase in displacement and compression ratio:

(with manual transmission)

- Two-barrel carburetor, 8.5:1 compression, 227 hp (169 kW) at 4600 rpm, 333 lb⋅ft (451 N⋅m) at 2300 rpm
- Four-barrel carburetor, 10:1 compression, 244 hp (182 kW) at 4800 rpm, 350 lb⋅ft (475 N⋅m) at 2600 rpm

(with Hydramatic)

- Two-barrel carburetor, 10.0:1 compression, 244 hp (182 kW) at 4800 rpm, 350 lb⋅ft (475 N⋅m) at 2600 rpm
- Four-barrel carburetor, 10.25:1 compression, 270 hp (201 kW) at 4800 rpm, 359 lb⋅ft (487 N⋅m) at 2900 rpm
- Three two-barrel carburetors, 10.75:1 compression, 290 hp (216 kW) at 5000 rpm, 375 lb⋅ft (508 N⋅m) at 2800 rpm.

Several dealer-installed camshafts were optional to increase power further to 317 hp (236 kW). which was seen on the hood of the 1957 Daytona Grand National winning car driven by Cotton Owens.

Standard only for the Pontiac Bonneville was Pontiac's first-ever fuel injection system. A mechanical system built by Rochester, it was similar in principle, but not identical, to the Rochester Ramjet offered as an option on the Chevrolet Corvette. Pontiac did not release official power ratings for this engine, saying only that it had more than 300 hp (224 kW). Contemporary road tests suggest that it was actually somewhat inferior to the Tri-Power engines, although it did have better fuel economy. Only 630 Bonnevilles were produced for 1957, all of them fuel-injected.

=== 370 ===
For 1958 the V8's bore was increased again to 4 1/16 in (103.2 mm), increasing displacement to 369.4 cu in (6.1 L). The engine was dubbed the TEMPEST V-8, a nickname it retained until the end of 1960.

The fuel-injected engine became an option on any Pontiac model, carrying a staggering price tag of $500 (almost 15% of the car's base price). It was rated at 310 hp (231 kW) at 4800 rpm and 400 lb⋅ft (542 N⋅m) at 3,000 rpm on 10.5:1 compression. Only about 400 were produced before the fuel injection system was quietly dropped.

=== 389 ===
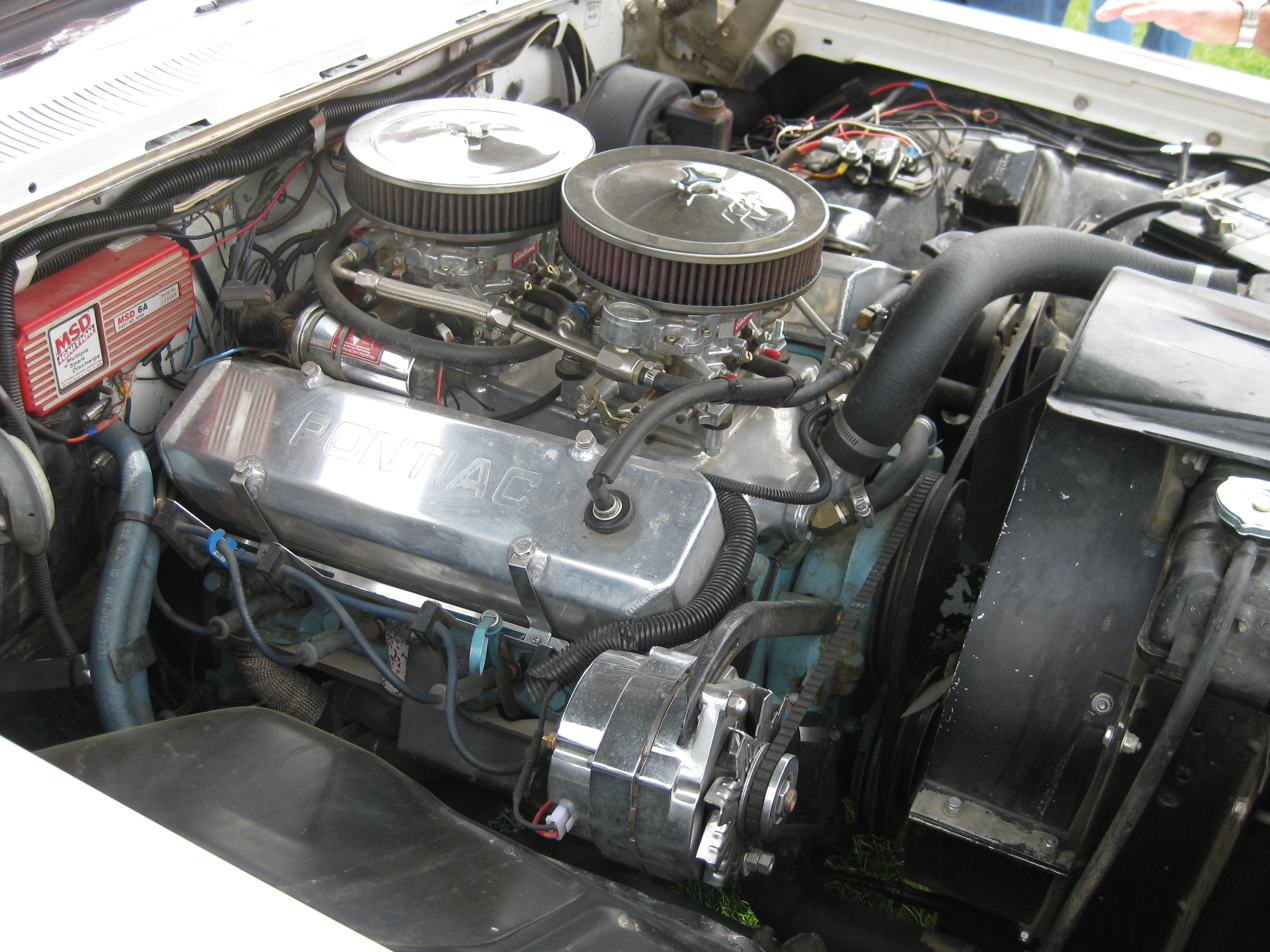
389 cu in (6.4 L) dual quad engine in a 1960 Pontiac Ventura

For 1959 the V8's stroke was increased to 3 3/4 in (95.3 mm), raising displacement to 389 cu in (6.4 L) and the main bearing size was increased to 3.00 inches. The large increase in the main bearing size was due to replacing the forged crankshafts for all engines except the SD racing versions with the introduction of an "Armasteel" cast steel crankshaft; and the engineers being very conservative in how strong the cast crankshaft would prove to be. The "Armasteel" cast crankshaft was the first cast crankshaft introduced by any of the Detroit automakers and the standard hardened cast-iron crankshaft used throughout the entire Pontiac V-8 line until 1967. "Armasteel" was a trademark of pearlitic malleable iron developed by GM's Saginaw Metal Casting Operations around 1936, which was referred to as "locking ball" cast-iron, as opposed to the "flaking" type found in other engines. In 1967, Pontiac moved on to a technologically simpler nodular cast iron (invented in late 1940s) crankshaft, which they continued to use until the Pontiac V8 engine was discontinued in 1982.The SD racing program was the source of factory supplied performance items such as 4 bolt main bearing caps and windage trays to reduce friction from crankcase oil. The 389 would remain the standard Pontiac V8 engine through 1966, offered in a bewildering variety of outputs ranging from 215 to 368 hp (160 to 274 kW). The 389 was the standard engine for the Pontiac Grand Prix and Pontiac Bonneville and installed in the Pontiac GTO through 1966. Beginning in 1961 the Pontiac V-8 (389 and 421) was dubbed the Trophy V-8, due to its many victories in racing.

=== 326/336 ===
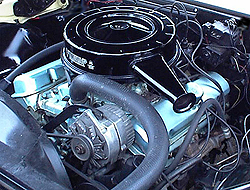
Pontiac 326 engine in 1967 Firebird

In 1963 Pontiac dropped the Buick division built 215 cu. in. aluminum V8 it had offered in the Tempest and replaced it with a small-bore version of the standard 389 cu in (6.4 L) Pontiac V8. It shared the 389's 3 3/4 in (95.3 mm) stroke, but its bore was 3.78 in (96.0 mm) for a displacement of 336.66 cu in (5.5 L). It was rated at 250 hp (186 kW) with 8.6:1 compression and 260 hp (194 kW) at 10.25:1 compression. Both used a single two-barrel carburetor. In 1964 when the new "A" body intermediates came out there was a new corporate (GM) engine size limitation to anything less than 330 cu in (5.4 L). and so the 326 bore size was reduced to 3.72 in (94.5 mm), giving a true 326.06 cu in (5.3 L). The 326 subsequently became the optional V8 engine for Tempests, and later the Pontiac Firebird, through 1967 and maintained the 17 degree cylinder head valve angle for its entire production run.

A higher-output four-barrel carburetor version was offered, called the 326 HO (High Output). With higher compression and dual exhaust it produced 280 hp (209 kW) for 1963–1964, and 285 hp (213 kW) for 1965 through 1967, its final year.

=== 400 ===
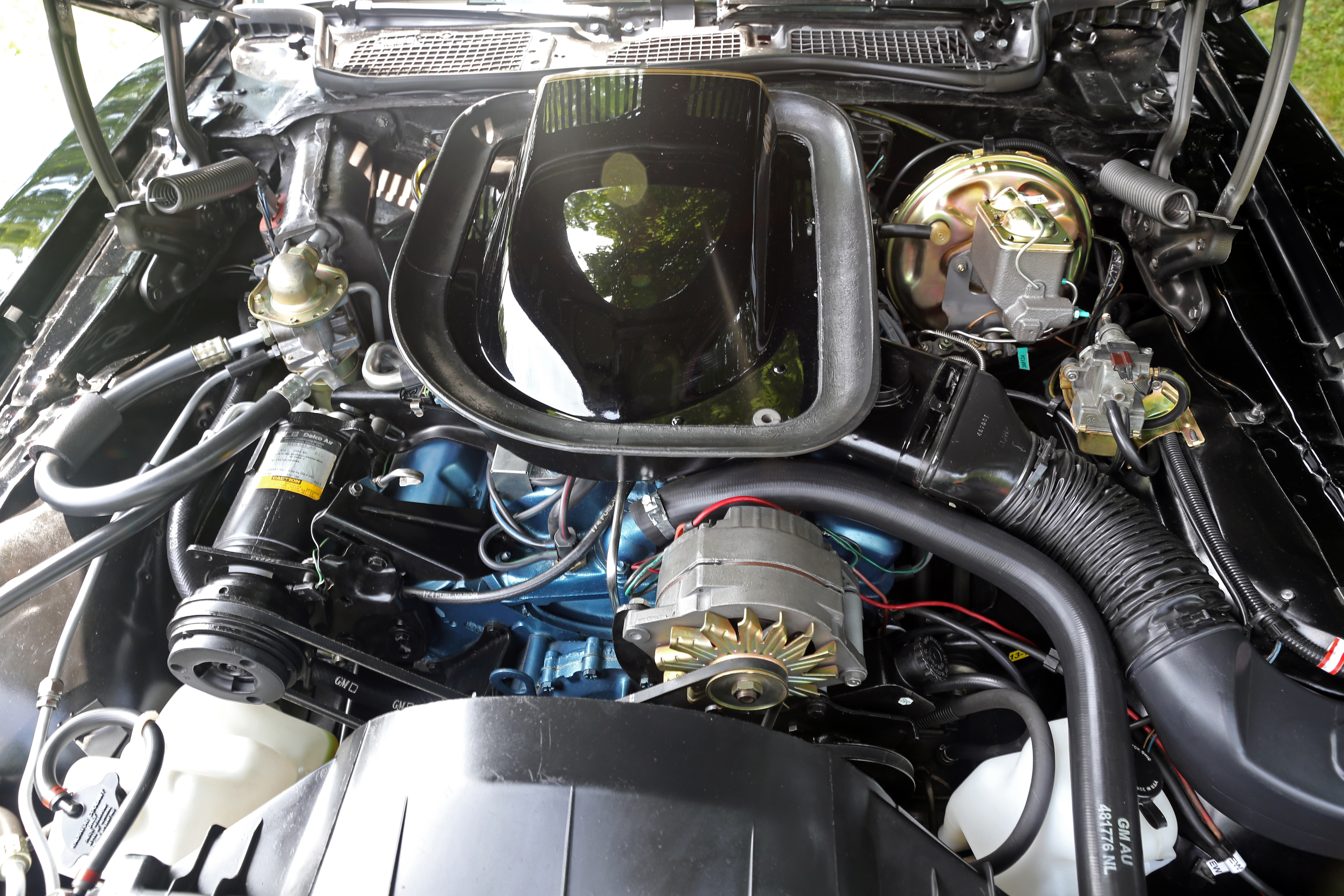
A L78 400 4bbl engine in a 1976 Y82 Limited Edition Trans Am

For 1967, Pontiac retired the 389 cu in (6.4 L) and replaced it with the 400 cu in (6.6 L), a 389 bored-out by +0.06 in (1.5 mm) to 4.12 in (104.6 mm) and retaining its stroke of 3 3/4 in (95.3 mm). The 400 remained in production through the 1978 model year, with 1979 cars receiving engines produced the previous year.

In basic 2-barrel form it produced 290 horsepower and 428 ft. pounds of torque in 1968. This was the engine installed in the Pontiac Executive line of large cars and its largest station wagon, the Pontiac Safari.

In 1967, the cylinder head design was improved for the 400 4-barrel engine. The valve angle was reduced from 20 degrees to 14 degrees for better breathing. 1967 was the last year for closed-chambered heads. The "670" head was a 1967-only casting, and the only PMD head to have a closed chamber with the new 14 degree valve angle. The 400 2-barrel and big car AFB 4 bbl kept the 20 degree valve angles for '67; starting in '68 all Pontiac V8s went to the 14 degree valve angle. Pontiac went to open-chambered heads in some 1967 models and all 68 and up to improve power, engine breathing and reduce emissions. The valve size increased as well, to 2.11 in (53.6 mm) intake and 1.77 in (45.0 mm) exhaust valves on high-performance heads. Low-performance and two-barrel applications, the standard engine in full-sized Pontiacs, got 1.96 in (49.8 mm) intake and 1.66 in (42.2 mm) exhaust valves and pressed in rocker arm studs.

In 1975, to assist in meeting CAFE emissions standards, Pontiac drastically modified the structure and metallurgy of the 400 blocks being produced. The 2bbl option was no longer available, and the sole 400 available for all model lines became the L78 400 with a 4bbl Rochester Quadrajet. This 400 engine was relegated to only produce 185 hp (or less depending on application) for the remainder of its production. These blocks were cast from 1975 through 1977, and were last used in 1978 model year vehicles. The block had metal shaved from the inner journals, and was made with a reduced nickel content to reduce weight from the completed engine with the goal of making the engine lighter, which would in turn reduce the overall weight of the vehicle, alleviating the emissions it produced. These blocks were denoted with casting numbers starting with 500, such as the "500557" blocks found in 1975-78 Firebirds. Pontiac did re-introduce the older, more durable block but the 400 no longer could meet the tightening emissions requirements, and block casting ceased in 1977. These stronger cast blocks were assembled and stockpiled for the 1978 and 1979 Firebirds equipped with the W72 Performance Package.

The four-barrel 400 was a popular performance option for many of Pontiac's cars. When fitted with other high-airflow components, it produced a good balance of low-end torque and higher-RPM power. In the 1968 Pontiac GTO it was given a 10.75:1 compression ratio and tuned to deliver 360 horsepower and 445 foot-pounds of torque.

=== 350 ===
In 1968 the 326 was replaced by the similarly 389-derived 350, which used a 3 7/8 in (98.4 mm) bore and 3 3/4 in (95.3 mm) stroke for a total displacement of 353.8 cu in (5,798 cc). Like the 326, it was offered in both 2-barrel and 4-barrel versions. In 1968, a 320 hp (239 kW) HO option was offered in the Tempest and Firebird. The 1969 HO 350 HO was equipped with the 400 cu in (6.6 L)'s large valve heads (# 48's) and the 400 HO camshaft and rated at 330 hp (246 kW). In 1974 it was used in the GTO and was rated at 200 hp (149 kW) (net).

Applications:

- 1968–1977 Pontiac Firebird
- 1968–1977 Pontiac LeMans
- 1968–1981 Pontiac Parisienne
- 1968–1970 Pontiac Tempest
- 1969 Pontiac Custom S
- 1970–1977 Pontiac Catalina
- 1972–1975 Pontiac Ventura
- 1973–1977 Pontiac Grand Prix
- 1974 Pontiac GTO
- 1978 Pontiac Grand Safari

== Short-deck engines: 1969 & 1977-81 ==
Unlike most long-production American V8s (were also exceptions), all Pontiac V8s shared the same external dimensions with three short-deck exceptions: the race-only 303 and the "EPA CAFE" 265/301 versions.

=== 303 ===
In March 1969 Pontiac unveiled RPO WS4, an optional handling and appearance package for the Firebird named after the SCCA Trans Am racing series, which Pontiac decided to participate in. The series required engines of less than 5 L (305.1 cu in), so Pontiac built a low-volume homologation engine for racing only; it was never made available to the public.

The 303 was designed explicitly to live above 5,500 RPM on SCCA road courses, with stability to 8,000+ RPM. Stroke was a very short 2.84 in (72.1 mm) on a forged SAE 4615 steel crankshaft with 2.5 in (63.5 mm) mains. 6.2 in (157.5 mm) rods traveled in an ultra short 8.24" deck (2" shorter than a standard Pontiac V8). Bore was 4.125 in (104.8 mm), yielding a 303.63 cu in (4,976 cc) displacement.

=== 301 ===
Pontiac offered the 301 from 1977 to 1981, and it was also installed in other GM division cars during those years. Based in part on the "short deck" 303 cu in (5.0 L) engine design, the 301 block had a 9.24" deck, 1" shorter than the standard V8s. A bore and stroke of 4 in × 3 in (101.6 mm × 76.2 mm) produced an actual displacement of 301.6 cu in (4.9 L; 4,942 cc). A unique crankshaft featured only two counter weights instead of the usual five, and also had lightened connecting rod journals. The heads were a new design featuring siamesed intake ports. The short-deck block and different intake ports required a new intake manifold.

Although it is much different from the original 1955-vintage Pontiac V-8 powerplant, the 301 has the distinction of being the last true Pontiac V-8 engine, as Pontiac ceased V8 production effective April 1, 1981.

==== 301 NA: Naturally aspirated ====
Using thin-wall casting techniques, the typical cast iron engine block wall of 4.0 to 5.5 mm was reduced to as little as 3 mm. Combined with the shortened deck, this resulted in an engine weighing less than the Chevrolet small-block V-8.

VIN format

- For 1977–1980 models, the engine type is the 5th digit of the 8-digit VIN.
- GM switched to a standardized 17-digit format VIN starting 1981, and the engine code moved to the 8th digit.

There were three distinct naturally aspirated versions built:

- 301 2-barrel (135 hp, 101 kW) produced 1977–1979, VIN code "Y"
- 301 4-barrel (150 hp, 112 kW) produced 1978–1981, VIN code "W"
- 301 HO 4-barrel (170 hp, 127 kW) produced 1979–1981, VIN code "W", RPO W72
- In 1980, Pontiac reused the "Y" VIN code briefly for California/high-altitude 4-barrel applications.

W72 versions were equipped with Electronic Spark Control (ESC), which included a controller module mounted near the firewall, and a knock sensor screwed into engine block. In 1981, these items became standard on all 4-barrel 301s, so the W72 option was dropped. Pontiac rated the 1981 version 155 hp (116 kW) and 245 lb⋅ft (332 N⋅m), although it is rumoured that the actual output was closer to 170 hp (127 kW).
NOTE: RPO W72 was also used for the 400 HO engine, but the VIN codes were different. The 301 HO was also known as the E/C or ESC version.

Applications:

- 1977–1981 Pontiac Bonneville
- 1977–1981 Pontiac Catalina
- 1977–1981 Pontiac Firebird
- 1977–1981 Pontiac Grand Prix
- 1977–1981 Pontiac LeMans
- 1977–1981 Pontiac Parisienne
- 1978–1980 Pontiac Grand Am
- 1978–1981 Buick Century / Regal / LeSabre

==== 301 T Turbo ====
The 301 Turbo was only offered in the Firebird Trans Am and Firebird Formula.

- 301T Turbo (210 hp, 157 kW), produced 1980–1981, VIN code "T"

Because the naturally aspirated (NA) 301 had been aggressively lightened to save weight, forced induction would have shattered a stock engine. The 301T got a beefier block than non-turbo versions, beefier main bolts, a rolled fillet crankshaft, and a 10psi high pressure fuel pump, and a very mild camshaft with 0.35 in (8.9 mm) lift and 250 degrees gross duration.

A Garrett TBO-305 Turbocharger was wastegate limited to 9 ± 1 psi (0.621 ± 0.069 bar) of boost. A unique single-plane intake manifold was specifically designed to mount the heavy Garrett and draw-through Quadrajet. A fully baffled oil pan and a 60 psi (4.1 bar) oil pump ensured adequate turbocharger cooling. Asymmetrical exhaust manifolds fed the turbo, and a dual-stage thermostat diverted hot coolant to the base of the carburetor when the engine was cold. The lightweight flat-top pistons in the 301 NA were replaced by dished, reinforced "D"-shaped pistons with moly-coated piston rings.

An 800 cu ft/min (23 m^{3}/min) Quadrajet carburetor was modified with extra-rich "DX" secondary metering rods and a remote vacuum source for the primary metering rod enrichment circuit, which allowed a Power Enrichment Vacuum Regulator (PEVR) (replaced by computer-controlled solenoids in 1981) to automatically dump extra fuel into the engine the moment boost was detected, cooling down the cylinders.

The turbo package mandated air conditioning, 3.08 rear axle gearing, and a THM350 (aka CBC350) non-lockup automatic transmission. The 1980 301 Turbo was rated at 210 hp (157 kW) at 4400 rpm and 345 lb⋅ft (468 N⋅m) at 2800 rpm.

For 1981, the 301T gained electronic controls with an O_{2} sensor, feedback ECM and E4ME Quadrajet providing a slight reduction in output to 205 hp (153 kW) and 340 lb⋅ft (461 N⋅m); however, these revisions and a THM350C lockup transmission did allow it to meet California emissions standards, whereas the 1980 version did not.

Applications

- 1980–1981 Pontiac Firebird Formula / Trans Am

=== 265 ===
Offered only in 1980 and 1981, the "LS5" 265 cu in (4.3 L) was a cost-effective, more fuel efficient derivative of the 301 V8 built to meet CAFE requirements. Based on the same short-deck and 3 in (76.2 mm) stroke as the 301, it featured a smaller bore of 3 3/4 in (95.3 mm), and produced 120 hp (89 kW). It could only be ordered in a 2bbl configuration with a TH200 automatic transmission.

==== Applications ====
- 1980–1981 Pontiac Bonneville
- 1980–1981 Pontiac Catalina
- 1980–1981 Pontiac Firebird
- 1980–1981 Pontiac Grand Prix
- 1980–1981 Pontiac LeMans
- 1980–1981 Pontiac Parisienne
- 1980–1981 Buick Century
- 1980–1981 Buick Regal
- 1980 Oldsmobile 88

== Large-journal engines: 1961–1976 ==
=== 421 ===
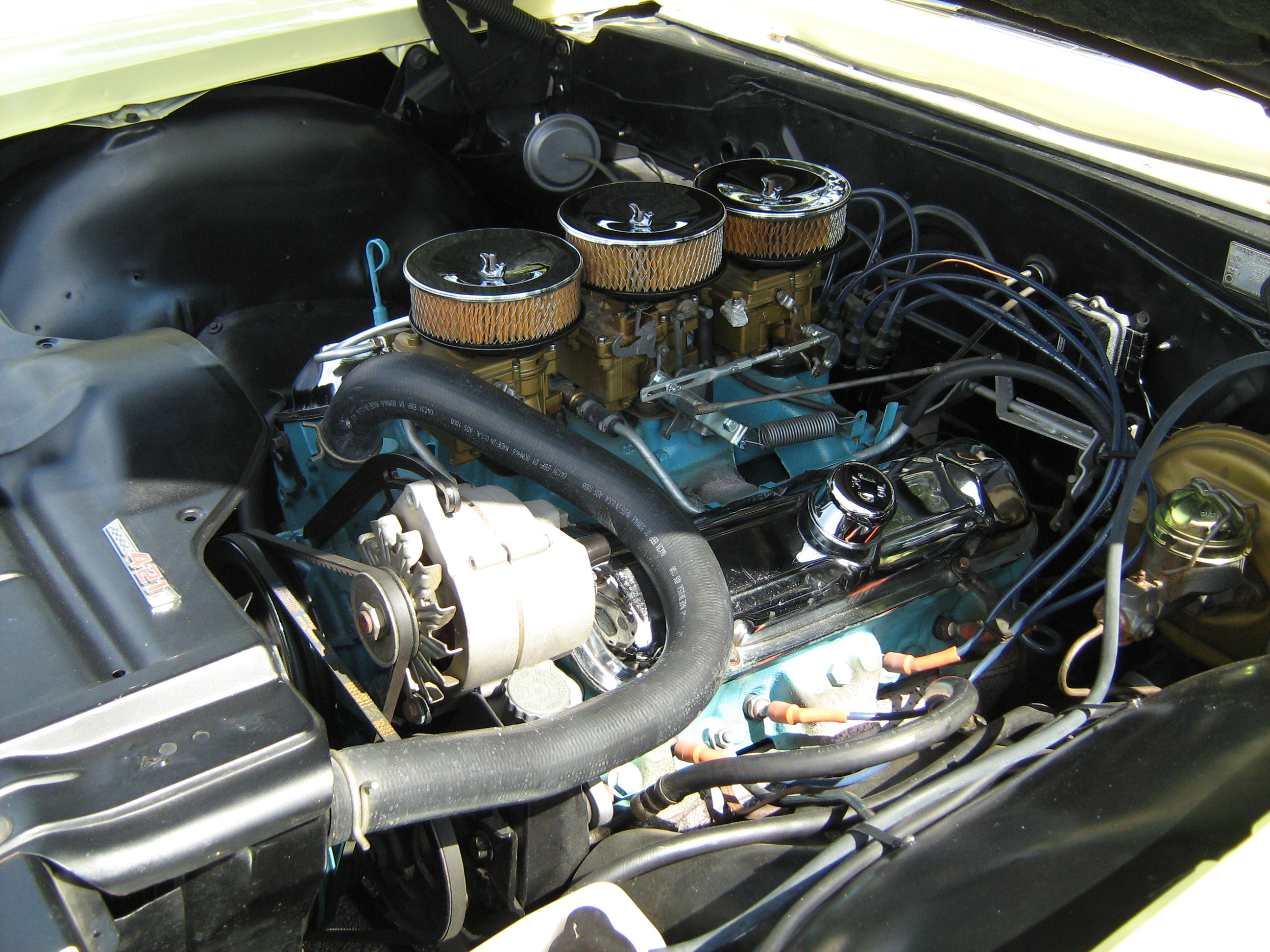
421 cu in (6.9 L) Tri-Power in a 1965 Pontiac 2+2 coupé

The 421.19 cu in (6.9 L) was introduced in 1961 as a dealer-installed Super Duty option for racing. Unlike previous enlargements of Pontiac V8s, it did not replace the 389. The first of the "big journal" Pontiac V8s, it had a bore and stroke of 4 3/32 in × 4 in (104.0 mm × 101.6 mm) and came with dual four-barrel carburetors. It featured 3 1/4 in (82.6 mm) main journals. The 421 SD became factory installed in 1962 and in 1963 a street version became available from the factory with a dual four-barrel or three two-barrel Tri-Power carburetion. Modified versions of this engine were extensively used in NASCAR stock car racing and drag racing competition. The premier SD 421 cylinder head was the late 1962-early 1963 casting #9771980 aka "980", featuring a larger 185 cc (11.3 cu in) intake port volume, flowing 230 cu ft/min (6.5 m^{3}/min) at 28 in (711 mm). The 421 HO (High Output) was introduced in 1964 as Pontiac's most powerful engine, replacing the 421SD as Pontiac had to discontinue their racing program after the GM board decided that all its divisions had to drop out of racing.

=== 428 ===
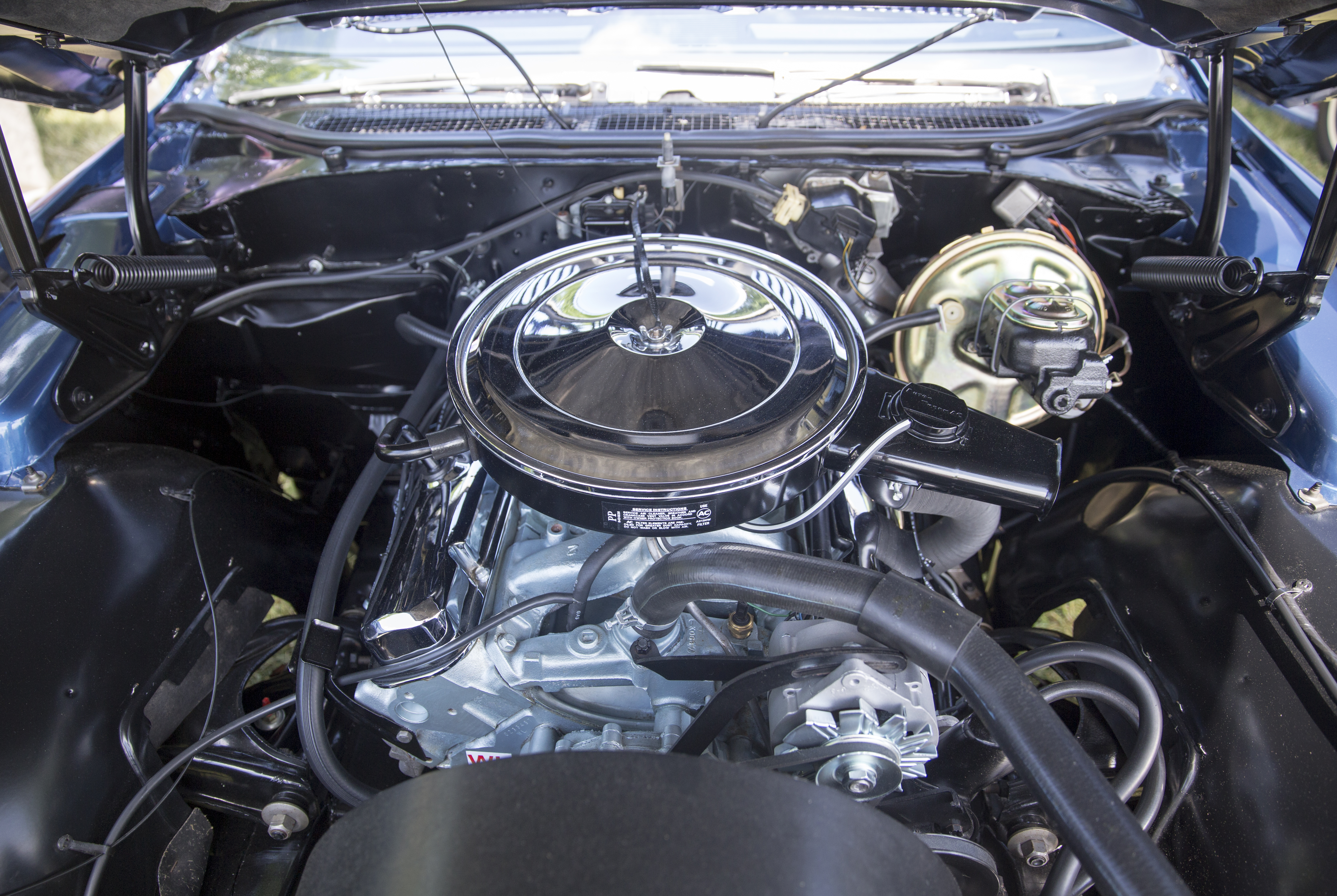
A 390 hp 428 V8 in a 1969 Grand Prix SJ.

In 1967 the 421 was enlarged to 426.61 cu in (7.0 L) by increasing its bore to 4.12 in (104.6 mm). Both Chevy and Ford had 427 cu in performance engines, so Pontiac simply referred to its 427 as a 428 to one-up them. It retained the 421's 4 in (101.6 mm) stroke and 3 1/4 in (82.6 mm) main journal.

Offered from 1967 to 1969, it produced 360 and 376 hp (268 and 280 kW) in 1967, 375 and 390 hp (280 and 291 kW) in 1968 and 360, 370 and 390 hp (268, 276 and 291 kW) in 1969. The crankshaft in the 428 had a "N" cast on them (designating nodular steel) as opposed to the 421's Armasteel. In 1969, Pontiac also used a revised crankshaft out of a Pearlitic malleable-iron, although it still used the "N" casting letter. This new material had stronger alloys in the iron. All 428 cylinder heads received the 14-degree valve angle; closed chamber only in 1967 and open chamber the next two years.

The 428 was factory installed in large cars only. However, a few dealers would offer them in the GTO or Firebird and do their own installations, such as Royal Pontiac who offered the "Bobcat" conversion. It was replaced by the 455 for the 1970 model year.

=== 455 ===
The 428 was increased to 456.12 cu in (7,474 cc) in 1970. Again, its bore was expanded, this time 0.03 in (0.76 mm) to 4.1525 in (105.47 mm). The stroke increased to 4.21-inch (106.9 mm). It was rated at 360 hp (268 kW), but the Grand Prix with the same specifications was rated at 370 hp (276 kW).

The gross horsepower ratings of this era were dubious, with engines rated higher or lower in output for advertising, political, or insurance purposes. Though listed as slightly less powerful than some high-performance iterations of the 400 (such as the 366 hp (273 kW) Ram-Air), the 455 had 500 lb⋅ft (678 N⋅m) of torque, 55 more lb⋅ft (75 N⋅m).

The engine was available in all full-size Pontiacs. An HO version could be ordered in the GTO, as GM had lifted its restrictions on offering engines larger than 400 cu in (6.6 L) in mid-sized cars (resulting in the 454 (7.44) Chevrolet Chevelle, 455 (7.5) Buick Gran Sport, and 455 (7.5) Oldsmobile 442).

For 1971, Pontiac introduced another High Output (HO) version with standard internal parts, a reinforced block with four-bolt main bearing caps, and improved cylinder head design with 1/8-inch taller (3.2 mm) intake ports and special round exhaust ports for better breathing, yet still making just 335 hp (250 kW) gross (or 310 hp (231 kW) in the more accurate SAE Net system). Standard in the Firebird Trans Am, it was still a rare engine.

In 1973 a further refined and even stronger version, the Super Duty (SD) engine, was planned for Firebird, Grand Am, Le Mans (GTO), and Grand Prix models. The SD-455 used round-port cylinder heads similar to those used on the 1971 and 1972 455 HO, with specific "LS-2" intake and cast-iron exhaust header manifolds. Still, it was the strongest American engine offered that year. Pontiac's initial plans were to use a camshaft with specs identical to the 041 Ram Air IV camshaft, but testing showed emissions, while technically compliant, did not have "cushion" to satisfy Pontiac's emissions engineers, to avoid production variation leading to any non-compliant engines being produced and sold. Though a change of camshaft would delay production, Pontiac decided to change camshaft, employing one with identical timing to the 744 camshaft, which had been used in the 400 Ram Air(aka Ram Air III) engine with manual transmissions. As a result, peak horsepower dropped from 310 to 290, though torque increased from 390 to 395 lb. ft. After the SD-455 was certified with the new cam, it was production-ready but was then further delayed by the EPA mandating Pontiac recertify all of its engines when the EPA discovered that part-throttle emissions exceeded the limits. Thus in March 1973 Pontiac eliminated a timing solenoid that gave full vacuum advance and disabled the EGR valve in high gear after a period of time that happened to exceed the running time of the EPA testing cycle. Once corrected the SD-455 was recertified and was released for production in late April 1973. Given how late in the model year it was, Pontiac decided not to incur the costs of recertifying the SD-455 for other models other than the Firebird. Ultimately Pontiac produced only 295 1973 SD-455 Firebirds (252 Trans Am, 43 Formula). For 1974 another 1,001 (943 Trans Am, 58 Formula) were built, after which the SD-455 was discontinued.

An evolution of the RA IV and H.O. designs, the SD-455 was a much improved engine. In addition to the more refined cylinder heads, block casting reinforcements in the lifter galley and main bearing oil pan rail area, it had forged connecting rods with larger 7/16-inch-diameter (11 mm) bolts. Made with a provision for dry sump oiling, it truly was a racing engine, detuned for use in passenger cars.

The 455 was used through 1976 when it, as with many other large displacement engines, was discontinued as manufacturers moved to smaller, more efficient models, even in their full size car lines.

== Performance Engines ==
=== Super Duty (1960-1963 & 1973-1974) ===
==== SD 389 ====
A 389 was available in 1960. A single four barrel version was rated at 348 hp. A tri-power version was rated at363 hp. Both had the #7 McKellar cam. In 1961 both tri-power and single four barrel used the #8 McKellar cam and were rated at 368 hp. In 1962 only a four barrel version was available, rated at 385 hp.

==== SD 421 ====
The 421SD was available in 1961 as a dealer option or over the counter then in 62 and 63 from the factory, and was fitted with a list of internal modifications designed solely to withstand the abuse of drag racing. Cam was a #541596 McKellar No. 10 with 308/320 degrees of duration and 0.445 / 0.447-inch lift (11.3 / 11.4 mm) with 1.65:1-ratio rocker arms and solid lifters, special #529238 forged-steel connecting rods, forged aluminum 4.09-inch (104 mm) bore Mickey Thompson pistons, #542990 forged-steel crankshaft with a 4-inch (101.6 mm) stroke and 3 1/4-inch (82.6 mm) diameter main journals. Dual Carter Carburetor 500 cu ft/min (14 m^{3}/min) #3433S (front) and #3435S (rear) carburetors with manual chokes and mechanical linkage. Factory heavy-duty high-pressure oil pump and eight-quart sump, four-bolt main bearing caps with Moraine aluminum bearings, and #1110976 dual-point distributor without vacuum advance. Two different cylinder-head castings were used for the 1962 model year, both with a combustion chamber volume of 68 cc (4.15 cu in) to produce an 11.0:1 compression ratio. Casting No. 540306 featured 1.92 / 1.66-inch (49 / 42 mm) valves and was carried over from the previous model year, production stopped in March 1962 and then casting No. 544127 with larger 2.02 / 1.76-inch (51 / 45 mm) valves entered production. Neither casting was equipped with an exhaust crossover.

==== SD-455 ====
Available only in the 1973 and 1974 Firebird Formula and Trans Am, the SD-455 consisted of a strengthened cylinder block that included 4-bolt main bearings and additional material in various locations for improved strength. Original plans called for a forged crankshaft, although actual production SD455s received nodular-iron crankshafts with minor enhancements. Forged rods and forged-aluminum pistons were specified, as were unique high-flow cylinder-heads. A camshaft with 301/313 degrees of advertised duration, 0.407-inch (10.3 mm) net valve lift, and 76 degrees of valve overlap was specified for actual production engines in lieu of the significantly more aggressive Ram Air IV-spec camshaft that had originally been planned for the engine (initially rated at 310 hp (231 kW) with that cam), but ultimately proved incapable of meeting the tightening emissions standards of the era with sufficient margin to satisfy Pontiac emission engineers given expected volume production variations. The very modest cam, combined with a low-compression ratio of 8.4 (advertised) and 7.9:1 actual resulted in 290 hp (216 kW) SAE net. The initial press cars that were given to the various enthusiast magazines (e.g. Hot Rod and Car and Driver) were fitted with the Ram Air IV-spec camshaft and functional hood scoops - a fact that has been confirmed by several Pontiac sources. Some production test cars ran considerably slower and yielded 1/4-mile (402 m) times in the 14.5 second/98 mph (158 km/h) range in showroom tune (uncited sources)- results that are quite consistent for a car with a curb weight of 3,850 pounds (1,746 kg) and the rated 290 hp (216 kW) SAE net figure that some sources suggest was "under-rated." However, in the June 1974 issue of Super Stock and Drag Illustrated, a new 1974 Trans Am with the SD-455 motor ran 14.25 at 101 mph (163 km/h). This was a completely stock car on loan from a private owner for the test. Furthermore, this car had an automatic, air conditioning, a 3.08 axle and weighed 4,010 pounds (1,819 kg). This test would tend to lend credence to the Car and Driver and Hot Rod tests of 1973 Super Duty cars with 3.42 gears, no air, and 160 lb (73 kg) less weight as being representative of production specimens capable of mid to high 13-second passes at 104 mph (167 km/h). Pontiac listed the 290 hp (216 kW) rating at 4000 rpm for a motor that had a 5700 rpm redline on the factory tachometer. Various Pontiac sources have emphatically stated that no 310 hp (231 kW) versions of the SD-455 were installed in regular production cars. The SD-455 motor was listed as an option in dealer brochures for the 1973 Grand Am and LeMans GTO(and planned for the Grand Prix as well) although none were produced for sale. Nevertheless, there appears in the October 72 issue of Motor Trend, a road test of a 1973 SD-455 Grand Am. 1975 Factory Service Manual lists the SD-455, but the SD-455 did not meet emissions for the 1975 model year and was canceled.

=== High Output (HO) (1963-1975) ===
==== 326 HO ====
A higher-output version was offered, called the 326 HO (High Output). It had a four-barrel carburetor, dual exhaust, and higher compression, and was good for 280 hp (209 kW) for 1963–1964, and 285 hp (213 kW) for 1965 - 1966 and the final year, 1967.

==== 350 HO ====
In 1968, there was also a 350 "HO" which had increased power with the addition of higher compression #18 heads (#17 and #46 were the most common 2-barrel heads), a four-barrel carburetor and matching intake that was also used on the 400 and 428 engines. There was also the addition of dual exhaust, and for vehicles equipped with a manual transmission, a slightly more aggressive camshaft.

In 1969 the 350 HO was upgraded again with the addition of the 400 HO cam, commonly referred to by enthusiasts as the 068 cam. Also added was the #48 casting number heads with a 68 cc (4.15 cu in) chamber for higher compression, along with larger 2.11 and 1.77 in (54 and 45 mm) valves. Free-flowing exhaust manifolds from the 400 Ram Air were used late in the model year. This was underrated at 330 hp (246 kW).

==== 400 HO ====
Officially named the Quadra-Power 400 for 1967 and renamed 400 HO for 1968, the 400 HO was first offered for 1967 as the third engine in the GTO line after the automatic-only 400 2-barrel and the standard 400 4-barrel (the 400 HO would not be offered in the Firebird until the 1968 model year). For the 1967 GTO the engine was rated at 360 bhp (268 kW; 365 PS) and had the cast-iron headers. The camshaft was the HO cam with 288/301 duration. It was the top-of-the-line engine unless one opted for the "Ram Air" V-8 derived from it. As Pontiac's 1967 performance brochure said, "You can add the Ram Air induction hood scoop and new high output cam and valve springs to the Quadra-Power 400 for better top end breathing." But the "Ram Air" 400 also mandated steep 4.33:1 gears(or 3.90:1 in Firebird), making the Quadra-Power 400 (400 HO) the top practical street engine option for most drivers. Standard ratio with the 400 was 3.55:1(except 3.36:1 in Firebird for 1969) regardless of transmission(3.23:1 for cars with air conditioning). The 400 HO was offered as an option for 1967–1970 for GTO and 1968–1970 for Firebird. For 1969–1970 GTO the 400 HO included driver operable Ram Air induction and was renamed "400 Ram Air" for 1969 and just "Ram Air" for 1970. In the Firebird Ram Air induction for the 400 HO was a separate option for 1969 (included with Trans Am) and included with the engine(optional in Formula; included with Trans Am) in 1970.

==== 421 HO ====
First offered as an option in 1963, the 421 HO came in a 4-barrel engine of 320 hp (239 kW) and one Tri-Power HO version with a hotter cam and efficient iron exhaust manifolds and rated at 370 hp (276 kW). Pontiac offered this to the public as a streetable version of the 421 SD. The engine came with 543797 (4-barrel) and 9770716 heads for the tri-power and special exhaust manifolds and a 7H cam with 292deg. intake duration and later 1964 L with 288deg intake essentially the same as the 068 cam. #9770716 aka "716" heads featured a 170cc intake port volume, and were considered a milder "street" version of the vaunted SD421 Super Duty heads. These same heads were also used on the 1964 GTO 389 tri-power engines. By 1965 and 1966 the same combinations would be rated at 338 hp (252 kW) for the 4bbl and the two Tri-Power versions would be rated at 356 hp (265 kW) and the HO version at 376 hp (280 kW).

==== 428 HO ====
This engine was first offered in 1967 as the top engine option in full-size Pontiacs. It was rated at 376 bhp in 1967 and 390 bhp in 1968 and 1969. For 1967 only Pontiac called this engine the Quadra-Power 428. It was renamed 428 HO for 1968.

==== 455 HO ====
1970 The 455 HO designation made its debut in 1970; Rated at 360 or 370 hp (268 or 276 kW) (depending on which vehicle it was installed into) and 500 lb⋅ft (678 N⋅m) of torque, it differed from the regular full sized car 455 by large valve heads with smaller combustion chambers, and a larger camshaft.

The 1970 '455 HO' was a conventional "D" port engine. It was rated at 360 hp at 4300 rpm in the GTO and 370 at 4600 rpm in the Grand Prix and other full-size Pontiacs. Ram Air induction was optional in the GTO, though power ratings were unchanged. Late in the model year the Ram Air 455 HO was made an available option for those GTOs with the optional "The Judge" package.

1971 The "455 HO" moniker took on a whole new meaning with the introduction of the 1971 model year;

Intended as a low compression progression from the previous years Ram Air IV engine, all 1971 455 HO engines used a heavy duty 4 bolt main block, round port cylinder heads (casting #197; with 8.4: compression), "Ram Air" style exhaust manifolds, and a two-part aluminum intake manifold.

The 1971 Pontiac 455 HO was Pontiac's first engine to receive a special 800 cu ft/min (23 m^{3}/min) Rochester Quadra-jet carburetor with specific jetting.

The 1971 455 HO was rated at 335 hp (250 kW) at 4,800 rpm and 480 lb⋅ft (651 N⋅m) of torque at 3,200 rpm (gross).

The 1971 455 HO was available in the Firebird (optional in Formula; standard in Trans Am), the GTO (standard with "The Judge" package), and the 2-door LeMans, LeMans T-37 (including GT-37), and LeMans Sport. Ram Air induction was optionally available with the 455 HO in the Firebird Formula(standard on Trans Am), GTO (standard with "The Judge" package), and 2-door LeMans Sport when the T41 Endura Styling Option was also ordered.

1972 The 455 HO moniker was again carried over, this time as a near-exact repeat of the 1971 offering, the only changes were the carburetors (they used a conventional 750 cu ft/min (21 m^{3}/min) unit this year), and the head castings (casting #7F6).

According to GM mandates horsepower was now rated in net figures as opposed to gross, so on paper the 1972 455 HO appeared to have a significant drop in power, but in fact it was very much the same engine, and performance figures reveal this to be true.

The 1972 455 HO was rated at 300 hp (224 kW) at 4,000 rpm and 415 lb⋅ft (563 N⋅m) at 3,200 rpm.

The 1972 455 HO was available in the Firebird (optional in Formula; standard in Trans Am) and 2-door LeMans (including those with the GTO option) and LeMans Sport convertible. Ram Air induction was optionally available with the 455 HO in the Firebird Formula (standard on Trans Am), and the 2-door LeMans (including GTO).

1975 After the 1974 SD455 was dropped the 1975 Firebird's top performance engine was an 'L78' Pontiac 400 cu in (6.6 L).

Pontiac still offered the regular 455 (RPO L75) in its full sized cars, and after a negative public reaction for dropping the 455 engine, it was re-introduced mid-year as an available option for the 1975 Pontiac Trans Am. However, the engine used in these Trans Ams was the same regular production 455 taken from the big body cars Pontiac was producing, and output 200 HP with a torque rating of 330 lb⋅ft at 2,000 rpm.

The 455 HO package was only available to late model year Pontiac Firebird Trans Am's, and was mandatory with a four-speed transmission. The shaker wore the decals "455 H.O." like the earlier 1971–1972 motor, but it was not the same motor, and featured standard d-port heads with a very conservative camshaft.

The 1975 455 HO package received some negative press/reviews as some buyers expected to see a return of the 1971–1972 engine, and were disappointed when they received the lower output motor. Upon reflection, many did not consider that it was the only large displacement engine still on offer for any performance car on the market, and reconsidered Pontiac's position between the rising CAFE emissions restrictions. Because of this negative feedback at the time, Pontiac dropped the "H.O." moniker for the 1976 model year.

=== Ram Air (1965-1971) ===
The beginnings of Pontiac's iconic Ram Air dynasty began during the 1965 model year. The GTO's new hood scoop design, with the inlets centrally located and mounted above the carburetor, provided the opportunity for experimentation. Royal Pontiac developed the prototype of the package on their 1965 GTO drag car and Pontiac picked up the idea and in August 1965 Pontiac offered the new Fresh Air package to dealers consisting of the parts and instructions needed to make the hood scoop functional, including the metal tub to mount to the carburetors and rubber gasket to seal it to the underside of the hood. The Fresh Air package continued into the 1966 model year.

Around January 1966 Pontiac took the next step and began offering as a factory option the XS-code engine. It included a new camshaft with duration increased from 288/302 (No. 068) to 301/313 (No. 744) and a new valve spring package with dampers to positively control valve action. Valve lift stayed at just over 0.400-inch with 1.5:1-ratio rocker arms. The tri-power equipped XS-code 389 was shipped with the Ram Air pan in the trunk, and the dealer had to fit it and cut out the underside of the hood scoop to make it functional. The XS-code 389 was still rated at 360 bhp at 5,200 rpm, same as the more common WS-coded Tri-Power 389, but performance was noticeably improved on acceleration runs. Pontiac engine production records report that 190 XS-code 389 engines were built during the 1966 model year. Whether all were installed in GTOs is unknown.

None of Pontiac's Ram Air engines actually enjoyed any true ram air effect. The inlets were all well within the boundary layer that exists close to the surface, so all of these systems would more accurately be described as "outside air induction" systems, benefiting from the intake of cooler, and thus denser, outside air versus the comparatively hotter and less dense air under the car's hood.

==== Ram Air (1967– mid year 1968) ====
Simply called "Ram Air" by Pontiac it was the first in a series of engines available from Pontiac as regular production line options and officially called Ram Air. Hewing to GM's standing edict limiting engine size to 400 cu in for its midsize and smaller cars, the 360 hp (268 kW) (underrated), the 400 cubic inch Ram Air V-8 was the most powerful and advanced option available in the 1967 GTO and Firebird. Its cast "670" heads had taller valve spring heights than the standard D-port heads, and the only 14-degree valve angle closed combustion chamber making these heads unique. It featured the "744" 301/313 camshaft, which offered more duration and overlap than the "HO". Along with the HO it also had Pontiac's famous cast-iron "headers", which were much better at reducing backpressure than the regular manifolds. The 670 heads were used until May 1967 when they were upgraded to become the "97" heads, which were then replaced late in the model year by the "997" heads which incorporated the upgrades of the "97" heads.

==== Ram Air II (1968 1/2) ====
The 1968 Ram Air II remained at 400 cu. in., again available only in the GTO and Firebird. It was factory rated at 366 hp at 5,400 rpm and 445 lbs.ft. of torque at 3,800 rpm in the GTO, and 340 HORSEPOWER at 5,300 rpm and 430-lb.ft. of torque at 3,600 rpm in the Firebird, with only a small throttle restrictor tab on the Firebird being different. It was the first engine that incorporated Pontiac's round-port head design in a production vehicle, however the intake port was the same as other D-port heads, leaving a head which exhaust port could nearly match the intake at high valve lifts. The Ram Air II also incorporated the first computer-designed camshaft. This camshaft sported a 308-/320-degree duration with 0.47-inch (12 mm) lift. This same camshaft was also used in Pontiac's 1969–1970 RA IV production cars. However, the RA II was limited to a 1.50:1 rocker ratio, while the RA IV used a 1.65:1 ratio, which yielded significantly greater total lift and, therefore, superior flow and power.

==== 400 Ram Air (1969) / Ram Air (1970), aka Ram Air III ====
Often called the "Ram Air III", this engine was officially called the "400 Ram Air" for 1969 and then simply "Ram Air" for the 1970 model year. A 400 cubic inch ram air equipped V8, it was an option on the 1969-70 GTO and Firebird Formula. For the 1969 and 1970 model years it was the standard engine in both the Firebird Trans Am and the GTO Judge. It was the same engine as the '67-'68 400 HO but for 1969 and 1970 it included a driver-selectable outside air induction system on the GTO(it was a separate option on Firebird), with the hood vents opened and closed using a knob located under the dash, below and to the right of the steering wheel, its bracket labeled "RAM AIR". It used the "744" camshaft (301–313) in the earlier manual trans versions, later downgraded to the "068" version, and the 288/302 duration cam with automatic transmission. It was rated at 366 bhp (273 kW) (gross) in the GTO version. Like previous generations of Ram Airs, it used Pontiac's special cast-iron "headers". It had 2-bolt main bearing caps in 1969, but went to a block similar to the Ram Air IV's in 1969 that was drilled for 4-bolt main bearing caps (but used a cast crank and cast rods). In 1970 the casting number #9799914 Ram Air 400 4-bolt main block also used the 4-bolt main caps on Ram Air applications.

==== Ram Air IV (1969–1970) ====
The Ram Air IV replaced the Ram Air II in 1969. It was called the Ram Air IV due to the planned use of four air inlets. Though production cars only got the two hood air inlets the name was retained. All 1968–69 #9792506 Ram Air 400 blocks have 4-bolt caps. The Ram Air IV used the Ram Air II's camshaft but lift in the Ram Air IV was increased to 0.52 in (13 mm) thanks to the use of 1.65 ratio rocker arms (vs 1.50). The Ram Air IV heads had 1/8" taller intake ports, larger intake port volume with more airflow, yet shared the Ram Air II round exhaust ports. In addition, a shallower spherical-wedge combustion chamber moved the tuliped valve heads .040" closer to the piston at TDC, improving mixture draw considerably during the intake stroke. The Ram Air IV also used a lightweight aluminum intake-manifold that produced a weight savings of 10–15 lb (4.5–6.8 kg). From 1969 though 1970, the Ram Air IV was available in both A-Body (GTO, including Judge) and F-body (Firebird, including Trans Am) form. While production of 1969–70 A-body Ram Air IV cars was low at just 1563 units(759 1969 GTOs including 302 Judges, and 804 1970 GTOs including 397 Judges) 1969 and 1970 model year F-body Ram Air IV cars were even rarer at just 245 total units produced. Only 157 Ram Air IV Firebirds, including 55 Trans Ams, were built for 1969. For 1970 the Trans Am was the only Firebird available with the Ram Air IV, and 88 were produced during the abbreviated 1970 F-body production run. A total of 1,808 Ram Air IV production cars were built over its 2-year production. Pontiac continued using its round-port cylinder-head design for 1971-'72 on the 455 HO. However, compression ratios were cut dramatically, marking the beginning of the end of the muscle car era.

==== Ram Air V ====
Though never factory-installed in any car, the ultimate engine of the Ram Air line of engines was the tunnel-port Ram Air V. In 1969 Pontiac created four versions of the Ram Air V engine: a 303 cu in (5.0 L) short deck version for SCCA Trans-Am racing, a 366 cu in (6.0 L) variant for NASCAR, a 400 cu in (6.6 L) version for street use in GTOs and Firebirds, as well as a 428 cu in (7.0 L) adaptation for drag racing. The cylinder head design is similar to the Ford FE tunnel-port head used in the GT40 and Can-Am series racing. So large are the intake ports that the pushrods run through the center of each port via pressed-in tubes, in addition to streamlined airfoils over the tubes themselves to improve port shape, and increase flow velocity. The 303 had shorter connecting rods, smaller 2.5 in (64 mm) journals and a solid lifter version of the Ram Air IV camshaft. It adopted a 4.125 in (104.8 mm) bore with a 2.84 in (72.1 mm) stroke, shared with the standard deck 303, for a displacement of 303.63 cu in (4,976 cc). The short deck engine weighed about 40 lb (18 kg) less than the other variants and had an 8000 rpm redline. Pontiac's SCCA Trans-Am program was promising, with race-ready engines producing 475 hp (354 kW) to 525 hp (391 kW), however the series’ General Competition Rules required the manufacturer to produce no less than 250 vehicles with the 303. Plans were made to produce Firebirds and GTOs with advertised ratings of 355 hp (265 kW) and 375 hp (280 kW) respectively but concerns about emissions, the response of the automobile safety lobby, and the warranty implications of a high-revving street engine led to cancellation of the program. T

While the exact total number of Ram Air V engines produced is not positively known, only about 25 303 cu in (5.0 L) engines were produced and about a dozen 428s and 366s. More 400 cu in (6.6 L) engines were produced by Pontiac than the other versions - estimates range from 80 to 200 units. Some 400s were dealer installed.

Parts for Ram Air V engines are not readily available. The cylinder heads on the 400 CID version had an intake port volume of 290 cc (17.70 cu in), nearly twice the size of a typical standard D-port Pontiac head - and flowed in the area of 315 cu ft/min (8.9 m^{3}/min) at 0.8 in (20 mm) valve lift; in the realm of the NASCAR-dominating Chrysler 426 Hemi.

=== W72 Options (1977-1981) ===
==== 400 W72 "T/A 6.6" ====
At the end of 1976, Pontiac was no longer able to continue production of the 455 (7.5 L) V8 motor due to the tightening emissions requirements. As Pontiac still wanted to offer a performance motor to compete in the performance market, they looked back to the 400 Pontiac and how it could be improved to offer greater performance while meeting CAFE standards.

In 1977 the 400-cubic-inch (6.6 L) T/A 6.6, (RPO code W72) was created to fulfil the performance engine gap in the Pontiac line-up. The W72 offered many improvements over the standard L78 400 Pontiac. One of the key upgrades were the 6x4 heads. The standard head seen on an L78 400 Pontiac was the low compression 6x8 head, while the 6x4 head seen on the W72 had hardened valve seats for a higher RPM operating range, improved air flow, and higher compression. These heads can be distinguished from 6x8 heads through a small stamped "4" on the top of the front boss. The head design was incorporated from the earlier 1970s 350 Pontiac heads, and could satisfy emissions in all states except for high-altitude emissions states and California. The W72 also featured a camshaft with a higher duration, finer tuned 800cfm Rochester Quadrajet, insulated fuel line, larger 60PSI oil pump, chrome valve covers, a larger harmonic balancer, and the "T/A 6.6" Shaker decal. All of these improvements provided the W72 with a power rating of 200 hp (203 PS; 149 kW) at 3600 rpm and 325 lb⋅ft (441 N⋅m) of torque at 2400 rpm, while the standard L78 400 only produced 180 hp (182 PS; 134 kW) at 3600 rpm and 325 lb⋅ft (441 N⋅m) of torque at 1600 rpm.

The W72 engine was standard in all 1977 Pontiac Can Ams (bar the 1977 Can Ams sold in California/High Altitude states which received the L80 Oldsmobile 403) and was optional in all 1977-79 Pontiac Firebird Formula and Trans Am models. The W72 package was a standalone option, and although was discounted when ordered in conjunction with the Y82/Y84/Y88 Special Appearance package, did not come included with Special Edition Trans Ams, it remained an extra cost option. With some WS6 "Trans Am Special Performance Package" bundles in 1978, the W72 engine was incorporated with the WS6 option group and not listed on the dealer order invoice. However, it can easily be determined by examining the cost price of the option, where the package excluding the W72 engine cost $251, and with the engine, cost extra at $324.

All 1977–1978 Trans Ams ordered with the 4-speed Borg Warner Super T-10 manual transmission received the W72 T/A 6.6 engine. There are no manual transmission equipped Trans Ams that came factory with the standard L78 400 motor in 1977–79. The W72 Performance Package also included an upgrade to the rear differential ratio, setting the rear gear ratio to 3.23 for all 1977 and 1979 W72 Firebirds, with the exception being 3.42 for 4-speed equipped W72 Firebirds in 1978 only.

All W72 equipped Trans Ams featured the "T/A 6.6" shaker decal. A common misconception made by enthusiasts was the notion that all Pontiac engine equipped Trans Ams featured the "T/A 6.6" decal on the shaker, however, it was exclusive to the W72 engine that was featured on less than half of all Trans Ams made during this period. All L78 Pontiac 400 equipped cars received the same shaker decal as the L80 Oldsmobile 403, being "6.6 LITRE". This may have been propagated by the only authorized company that is licensed to reproduce these decals not including the "6.6 LITRE" in the Trans Am decal kits, and only including "T/A 6.6" with no extra cost.

For the 1978 model year, Pontiac re-incorporated the earlier thicker cast cast engine block denoted by the cast number 418988 and a "XX" cast into the side of the block. The earlier 1975-78 blocks had metal shaved from the journals and bottom end as well as a decrease in the nickel content of the block in an attempt to decrease the overall weight of the vehicle to help alleviate emissions and cost. The camshaft was also revised to have a slightly higher duration, the carburetor jets tuned and a dual exhaust was implemented allowing the power to increase to 220 hp (223 PS; 164 kW) at 4000 rpm and 320 lb⋅ft (434 N⋅m) of torque at 2800 rpm. By mid-1978, the W72 could no longer be ordered in conjunction with the MX1 3-speed Turbo-Hydramatic 350 automatic transmission, and could only be ordered with the 4-speed manual transmission.

By 1979, Pontiac was no longer allowed to produce the 400 engine as emissions further tightened. Pontiac had prepared for the forthcoming cancellation of the venerable 400 by producing large volumes of the stronger cast "XX" 400 blocks in 1977 that were assembled in 1978, and stockpiled at a warehouse by the assembly plant for later use. The 1979 Firebird model line was the last year for the Pontiac 400, and by this point not only was it required with the 4-speed manual transmission, it also required the WS6 Special Handling Package as mandatory equipment. The W72 was only available for a very short time, with the majority of 1979 model year W72 Firebirds ordered in late 1978. By early 1979, orders for the W72 package were being rejected by dealers as they supply had run dry. Instead, they were substituted with the L80 Oldsmobile 403, or the L37 Pontiac 301 if they still requested a 4-speed transmission. On the invoicing for the 1979 model year Firebirds, they had the option listed as L78, however, every 1979 400 equipped car received a W72 engine.

According to the June 2019 issue of Muscle car Review magazine, during dyno testing performed during that era, the National Hot Rod Association (NHRA) rated this Pontiac W72 400 T/A 6.6 engine at 260 to 280 net horsepower instead of the 220-hp rating published by Pontiac. The 1979 W72/WS6 equipped Trans Am was considered to be one of the overall best performing cars of the decade due to having a powerplant that produced more power than any other competitor on the market at the time with handling equipment to supplement the performance.

==== 301 W72 "T/A 4.9" ====
As the 6.6L V8's were completely dropped for the 1980 model year, Pontiac applied the same principles of the 400 W72 when the 455 engine was dropped to the smaller capacity 4.9L 301 engine. The W72 301 was a tuned iteration of the L37 301 Pontiac V8 with various upgrades to improve power and performance. All 1980 Trans Ams received this engine as standard with the option to delete this engine as a credit option for the standard L37 301, and the Firebird Formula featured this engine as a pay extra upgrade. The most noticeable difference with the engine was the inclusion of the ESC (Electronic Spark Control), in conjunction with a revised exhaust system and the reinforced Turbo block, providing slightly more power at 170 hp (127 kW) for the 1980-81 model years, over the 150 hp (112 kW) rating for the standard L37 engine. For 1981 this engine was formally referred to as the "4.9 Liter 301 E/C" [EC denoting Electronic Controls] in GM literature such as the service manual and dealer ordering information. The RPO W72 option code was dropped from ordering information as the engine was now the standard equipment for all 1981 model cars, but the W72 code was still listed on the build sheet for these vehicles, similar to how all W72 engines in 1979 were coded L78.

One of the key differences between the W72 301 over the standard L37 301 4-barrel was the reinforced block utilized in the LU8 301 Turbo engine. The 301T block was significantly more durable than the standard 301 block due to the thicker internal journals and higher nickel content in its casting. The W72 upgrade included the ESC (Electronic Spark Control) distributor and controller borrowed from the 301 Turbo, which allowed for higher timing without the risk pinging or preignition that could potentially damage the engine. A larger 4 in (101.6 mm) cold air flex duct from the air cleaner to the left-hand fender akin to the earlier 1978-79 W72 intake, specific carburettor calibration for the Rochester Quadrajet, a "T/A 4.9" callout on the shaker, 60 psi oil pump, and cam similar in grind to the 220 hp (164 kW) 400 from the 1978–1979 model year were also part of the upgrade. However, there were no improvements in the "01" cast small-valve high-velocity heads, limiting the improvements that could be made to the compression and air flow. Additionally, the 301 W72 never received the option to come equipped with a manual transmission like the L37 301 received in 1979, and disappointingly, production for all Pontiac V8's ended soon after as GM sought to "corporatize" engine production.

== Experimental V8s ==
=== 427 Hemi SOHC ===
This was a project started with the end goal of building a 427 Hemi. Pontiac asked Mopar (Chrysler, Dodge, Plymouth) for help in designing it and making it work. Surprisingly, Mopar actually agreed and sent over several of the engineers that designed both the 392 and 426 Hemi. The goal of making a Pontiac Hemi succeeded but the engine was never produced.

==== Features ====
- Thin-wall, cast aluminum block
- 4.342 in × 3 3/4 in (110.3 mm × 95.3 mm) bore x stroke, 8 cylinders, each having a bore of 4.342 inch and a stroke of 3.75 inch, results in a displacement of 444.21 cubic inches (7,279.34 cc); for the Pontiac OHC 427 Hemi refers to it as a "TOHC" and lists the bore at 4.257 inch—which, with a stroke of 3.75 inch, results in a displacement of very slightly more than 426.99 cubic inches (very slightly more than 6997.124 cc).
- 3 in (76.2 mm) main bearings
- Forged steel 6.625 in (168.3 mm) rods (Ram Air V style)
- 12:1 compression
- Mechanical Port Fuel Injection
- Large-valve heads (valve diameter): 2.4 in (61 mm) intake, 2 in (51 mm) exhaust
- Small-valve high-RPM head (valve diameter) 2.19 in (56 mm) intake, 2 in (51 mm) exhaust
- Splayed main caps, head bolts tie into main caps. Head bolts do not pull on the cylinder wall causing distortion.
- Cam drive: fiberglass belt
- Maximum RPM (high-RPM engine): over 8000 rpm
- Engine weight: estimated 550 lb (249 kg) complete

==== Dimensions ====
- width 32 in (810 mm),
- length 32 in (810 mm)
- height 24.6 in (620 mm)
- Power: estimated 640 hp (477 kW) at 7500 rpm

=== Pontiac SOHC 421CID V8 ===
Most likely prompted by its development of the Pontiac OHC six, the GM division built three different experimental SOHC 421 CID V8 engines in the early 1960s. According to the engineers who worked on the project, the SOHC 421 engines produced around 625 hp and were capable of turning 7,000 rpm.

One version of the engine featured camshafts driven off the front of the engine, another design had the cams driven by gears off the back of the engine. Apparently at least one of these engines survives under the hood of an engineer's personal Pontiac.
