= Pontiac 301 Turbo =

Car engine

Overview
- Manufacturer: Pontiac
- Production: 1980–1981

Layout
- Configuration: V8
- Valvetrain: Overhead valve

Chronology
- Predecessor: 301.6 cu in (4.9 L) Pontiac 301

The Pontiac 301 Turbo (RPO LU8) is an engine that Pontiac produced for the 1980 and 1981 Pontiac Firebird. It was derivative of the 301cu Pontiac V8 that differed slightly from the traditional design of the Pontiac V8 family. While the Pontiac 301 had already been in production since 1977, the inclusion of Forced Induction was not implemented until the 301 Turbo development began in 1978. Pontiac had already discontinued their 455 in 1976 due to the tightening emissions mandates for manufacturers, and production for the 6.6L engines such as their 400cu engines and the Oldsmobile sourced 403 was beginning to wind down as the CAFE requirements increased. Pontiac Firebird Pontiac sought to find a solution to the lack of performance engine options available, as GM was pushing for Pontiac to utilize the already existing Chevrolet 305 5.0L V8 as part of their corporatization of their brands for cost cutting measures. Pontiac only had the 301 platform still in production, and they intended on refusing to use Chevrolet drivelines for as long as they were able. Considering the limitations of the 301 for raw perofrmance, they sough to increase performance through an exhaust-driven turbocharging system. One of the General Motors Institute (GMI) professors, Jim Lyons, was brought on by Pontiac to assist in the development of the turbocharged set up for the Firebird. Pontiac's chief engineer of induction, emissions, and exhaust Leo Hilke worked on designing the 301 Turbo for mass production. His team had found it significantly more difficult to engineer the turbocharging set up contrasted to the high performance Ram Air engines such as the 303 they had worked on previously, but when given the ultimatum of either using Chevrolet's drivelines or continuing to develop the 301 Turbo, they persevered, and the 301T reached a point in which it was optimized for efficiency and met the strict emissions requirements. A 1980 Turbo Trans Am was tested by Hot Rod Magazine in March of 1980 and was able to achieve a 16.30 second quarter mile time, while comparatively the 1980 Chevrolet Camaro equipped with the Small-Block Chevrolet 5.7L 350cu LM1 and a 4-speed manual completed the quarter mile in 16.40 seconds in a test by Car and Driver in April of 1980.

The 301 Turbo finally met production and was first added to the Pontiac model line-up in 1979 as an available driveline option for the 1980 model year, making the first production Pontiac V8 engine to use forced induction. It was only available for the 1980 and 1981 model years, which were also the last two years of this body style of the Firebird before it was succeeded by the all-new third-generation F-body in 1982. The 301 Turbo was intended to continue onto the third generation platform, however General Motors ceased the production of the engine as part of the corporatization of GM's engine development. 1982-84 Pontiac Firebirds featured a bulge in the hood as seen in the 1980-81 Turbo-equipped Firebirds as the platform was designed to include the 301 Turbo as an engine option. While the Turbo hood was still manufactured and featured on the third generation Firebird, GM pulled the 301 Turbo from the line up before the model went into production.

== Specifications ==
The 1980 iteration of the LU8 Pontiac 301 Turbo was rated at 210 hp (157 kW) and 345 lb⋅ft (468 N⋅m), and was only available with the Turbo Hydramatic 350 3-speed automatic transmission, with a 3.08 rear gear ratio. The turbocharger was operated through the use of a Power Enrichment Vacuum Regulator that allowed the primary metering rod circuit of the carburetor to provide the necessary fuel enrichment and air/fuel ratio during the various loads of the engine. The LU8 301 Turbocharged option cost $350 when ordered for a Trans Am and $530 when ordered for the Formula, but as the 301T required C60 air conditioning due to a specific heater core box designed to accommodate the extra space occupied by the turbo exhaust, the customer also had to pay an additional $566 as part of the package. A set of boost lights (RPO UR4) designed by John Schinella (credited with designing the Firebird's hood decal and other designs) were created as an additional option for Firebirds equipped with the 301T that played a similar role to the late 1960's Pontiac hood mounted tachometers. It featured a set of lights that would light up as the turbocharging system accumulated boost through vacuum pressure switches located on the intake of the engine. This option was standard on the Y85 Pace Car, but due to some production delays, only became available for other Firebirds on the 17th of January, 1980. A memo to Pontiac dealers on the 21st of November, 1980 announced that orders for the 301 Turbo must now be accompanied by the option for 4-wheel disc brakes (RPO J65), however the WS6 Special Handling Package was never mandatory equipment with the 301 Turbo.

For the 1981 model year, the engine underwent modifications, producing a conservatively rated 200 hp (149 kW) and 340 lb⋅ft (461 N⋅m) of torque. As part of General Motors' federal emissions compliance in the United States, the 1981 Pontiac Firebird was equipped with the standard Computer Command Control (CCC) system. This early electronic control unit (ECU) managed the Rochester E4-ME Quadrajet carburetor. On domestic turbocharged models, the CCC system replaced the previous Power Enrichment Vacuum Regulator (PEVR), utilizing electronic and barometric pressure sensors to provide data for the feedback carburetor. Firebird Turbos sold outside the USA still used the PEVR equipment, such as Firebirds sold in the Canadian market. The implementation of the CCC somewhat decreased the horsepower, but allowed the 301T equipped Firebirds to be sold in emissions states in conjunction with the VJ9 Californian Emissions Compliance equipment, making it the most powerful Firebird to be sold in the Californian and High Altitude markets since 1974.

== Design ==
The 301 Turbo was unique in that it had a stronger block with thicker cylinder walls made from higher quality casts within increased nickel content contrasted to the standard 301 naturally aspirated low-deck block. However, the W72 iteration of the naturally aspirated 301 engine utilized this 301T block. In addition, it also featured newly developed internals such as forged pistons with a unique "D"-shaped piston surface, a relatively mild camshaft, a high pressure oil pump (60 psi) to ensure adequate oil to the oil-cooled Garrett TBO-305 Turbocharger, a rolled fillet crankshaft with 2 instead of 5 counterbalances, a fully baffled oil pan, and a high pressure fuel pump (10 psi), a unique single plane intake, side and turbo-specific exhaust manifolds, and an Electronic Spark Controller (ESC) using a knock sensor to retard timing when detonation is detected.

The M4ME (E4ME for 1981) 800 cfm Rochester Quadrajet, unique to the 301 Turbo, had super rich "DX" secondary metering rods and a remote vacuum source for the primary metering rod enrichment circuit; the "PEVR" or Power Enrichment Valve Regulator. Boost was regulated by a wastegate, and was delivered to dealerships with a standard factory limit set to 9 psi (+/- 1 psi), although measured real-world factory default settings ranged from around 7 to 10 psi. The wastegate could be safely user-adjusted to 15 psi by adding alcohol or water injection, or even higher with heavier modifications.

Because the engine still used a carburetor instead of fuel injection, it could not take full advantage of the forced air through the turbocharger. The low-octane and low-quality fuels used in the early 1980s could have caused severe detonation under boost, had it not been for the ESC.

== See also ==
- Pontiac V8 engine
- List of GM engines
