= Oldsmobile Omega =

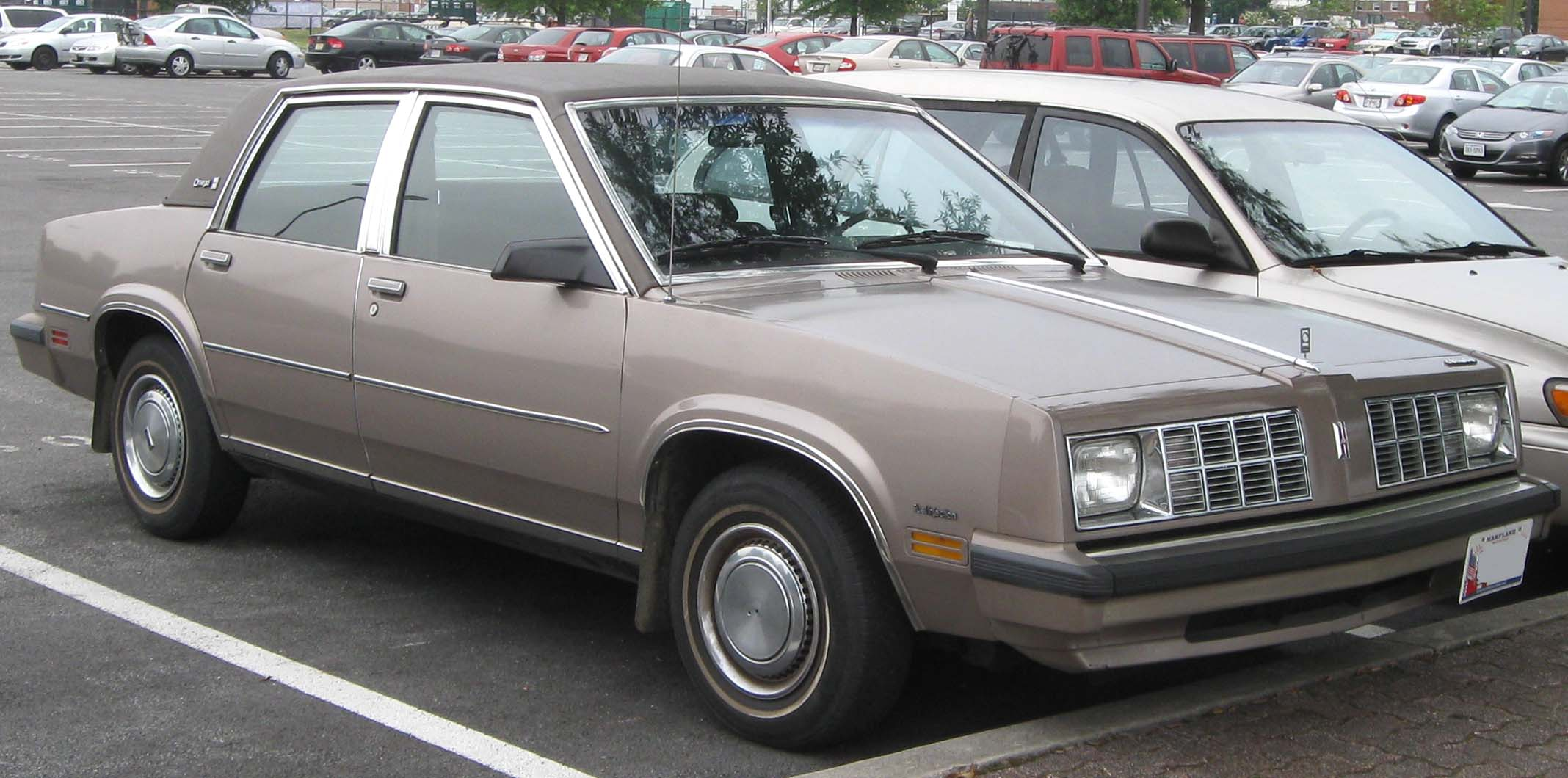
- Third generation Oldsmobile Omega

Overview
- Manufacturer: Oldsmobile (General Motors)
- Model years: 1973–1984

Body and chassis
- Class: Compact
- Platform: X-body

Chronology
- Successor: Oldsmobile Cutlass Calais

The Oldsmobile Omega is a compact car manufactured and marketed from 1973 to 1984 by Oldsmobile, as the brand's most affordable, entry level vehicle — across three distinct generations.

The first two generations of the Omega used rear-wheel-drive configuration, as a badge engineered variant of the Chevrolet Nova. The third generation was marketed from 1980 to 1984 in a front-wheel-drive, as a variation of the Chevrolet Citation.

The omega nameplate derived from the last letter of the Greek alphabet; the model names of the four variants (Nova, Omega, Ventura, and Apollo) also spelled out "Nova".

== First generation (1973–1974) ==
First generation
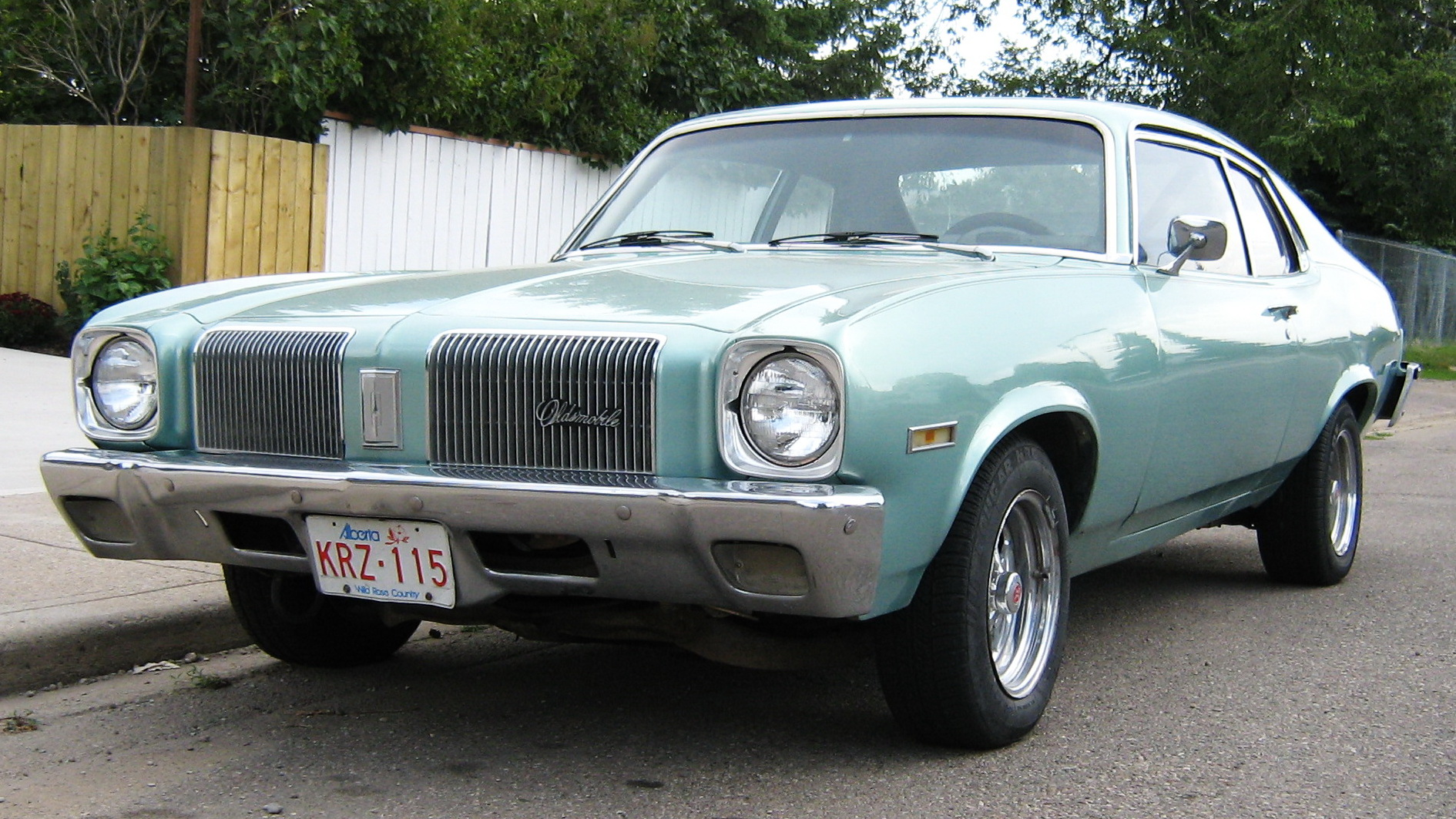
- 1973 Oldsmobile Omega coupe

Overview
- Model years: 1973–1974
- Assembly: Van Nuys Assembly, Van Nuys, California; Willow Run Assembly, Ypsilanti, Michigan

Body and chassis
- Body style: 2-door coupe; 3-door hatchback; 4-door sedan
- Layout: FR layout
- Platform: X-body
- Related: Buick Apollo; Chevrolet Nova; Pontiac Ventura

Powertrain
- Engine: 250 cu in (4.1 L) Chevrolet I6; 350 cu in (5.7 L) Rocket 350 V8

Dimensions
- Wheelbase: 111 in (2,819.4 mm)

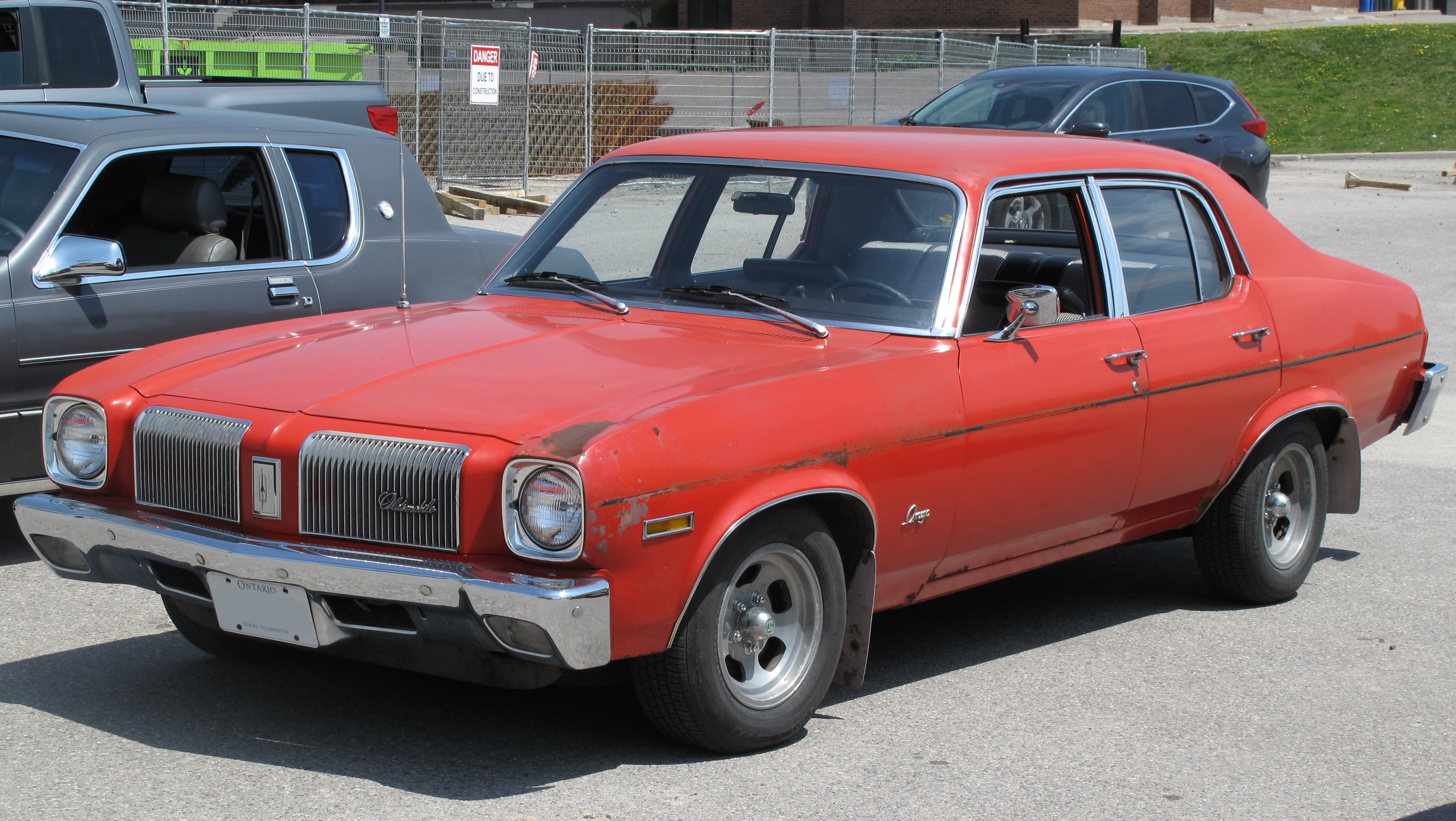

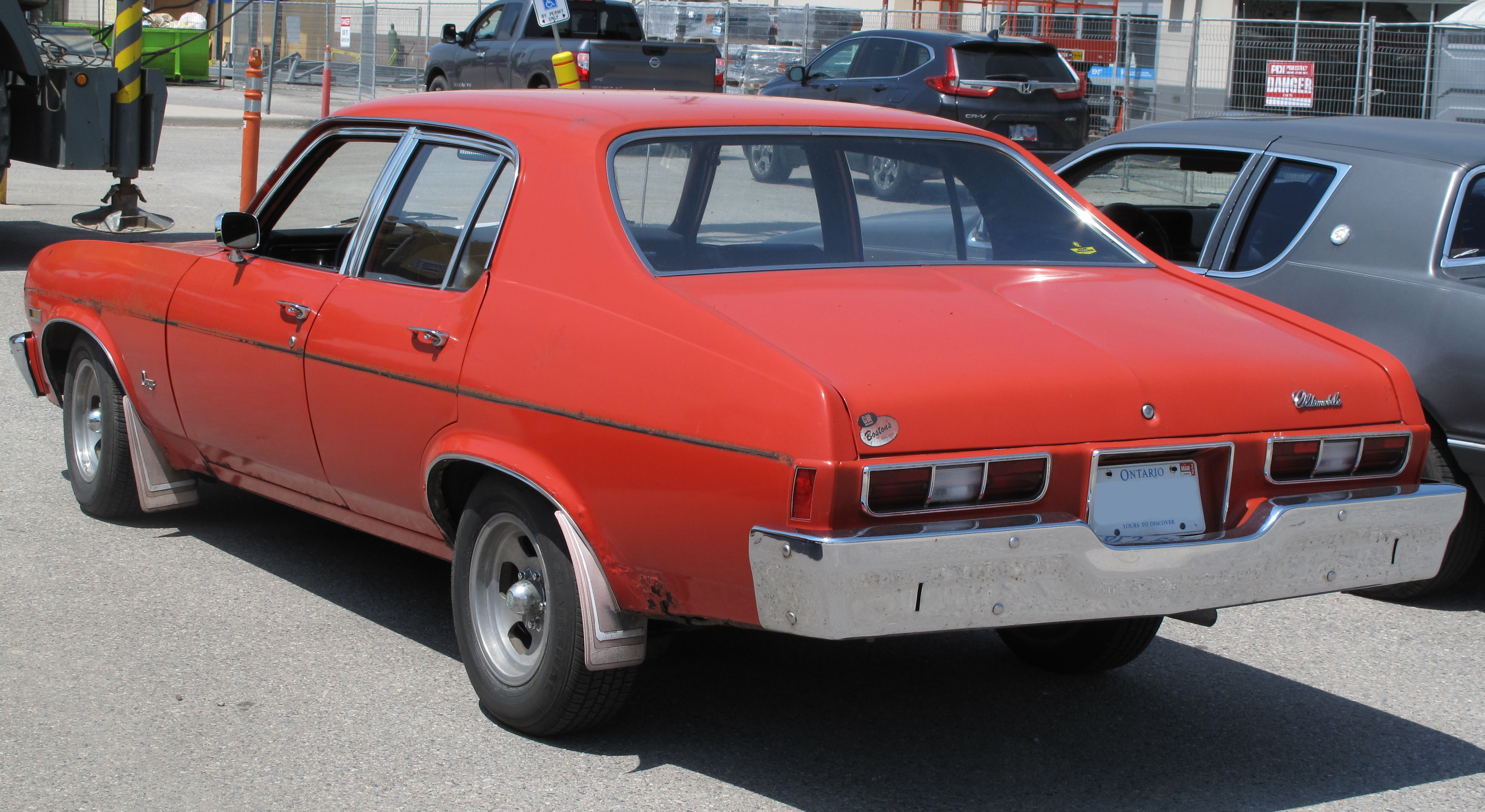
1973 Oldsmobile Omega Town Sedan

The Omega and the Buick Apollo were introduced in 1973 as badge engineered variants of GM's X-body Chevrolet Nova clones, following the Pontiac Ventura's 1971 introduction. All four cars shared the Nova's body and mechanicals; the Omega was distinguished by the brand's split "waterfall" grille, unique rear trim, and more upscale interior trim including woodgrain trim on the dash. Parking lights were directly below in the bumper. Bodystyles included a two-door coupe, three-door hatchback, and a four-door sedan.

Engine choices were the standard Chevy-built 4.1-litre (250 cid) I6 with a 3-speed manual transmission standard, with a 4-speed manual or a 2- or 3-speed automatic optional. The lone V8 was Oldsmobile's 5.7 L (350 cid) "Rocket" V8, which had a 4-speed manual as standard with the 3-speed automatic optional. V8 models with the fifth VIN digit being the letter "K" received a 4-barrel Rochester carburetor. All other V8 engines received the standard 2-barrel version. There were also 53 "Doctor Oldsmobile Omega" manufactured in 1973 in Van Nuys, California with V8 engines and marketed exclusively at Century Oldsmobile in Van Nuys. This decal option was canceled in 1974.

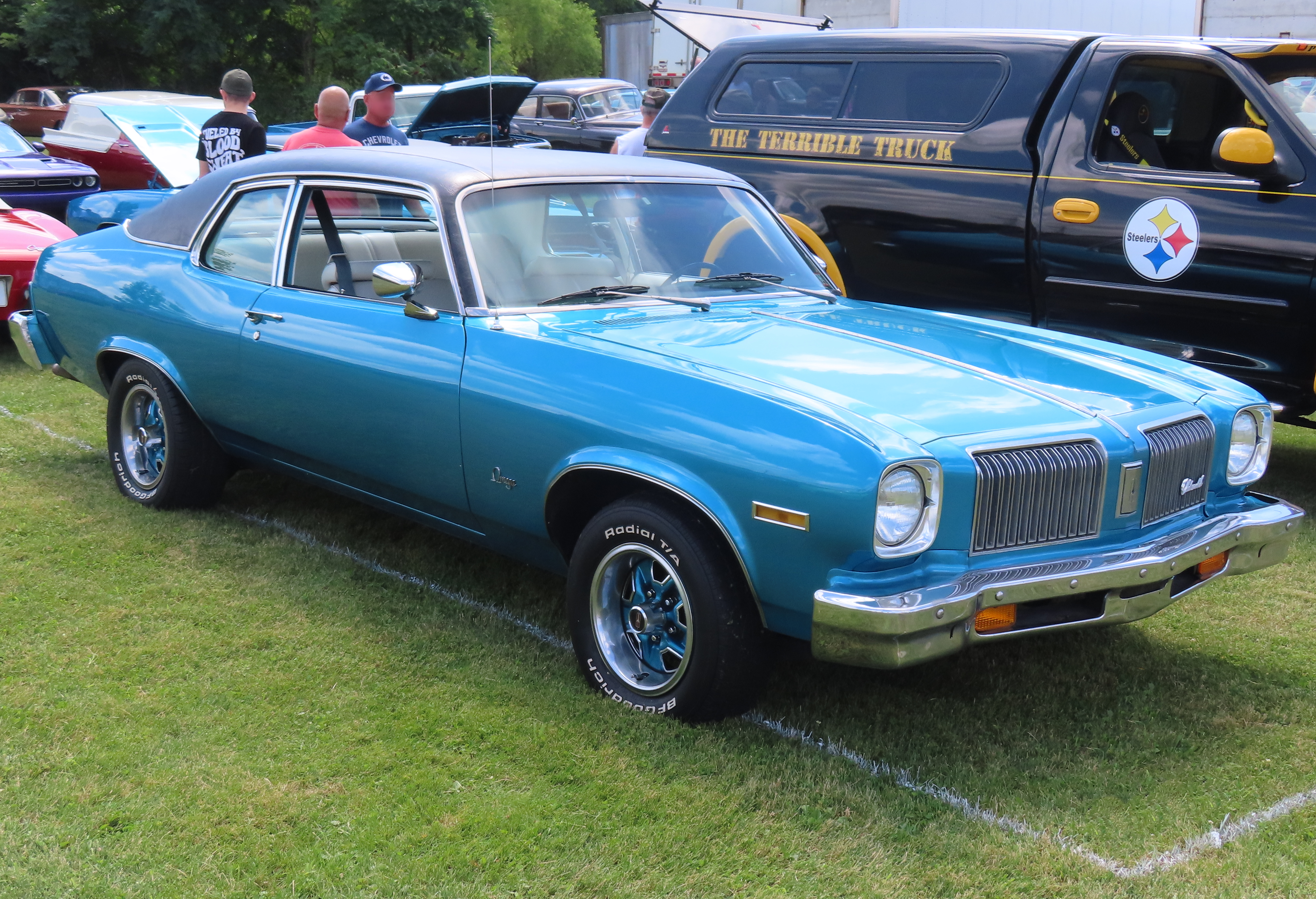
1974 Oldsmobile Omega coupe

Changes for model year 1974 included revised trim levels, including a base model and a new upper-level Brougham S trim. The parking lights were relocated inboard below the grille instead of the headlights and there was a new rear bumper design meeting the federal 5-mph impact standards. The 2-speed Powerglide transmission was dropped.

== Second generation (1975–1979) ==
Second generation
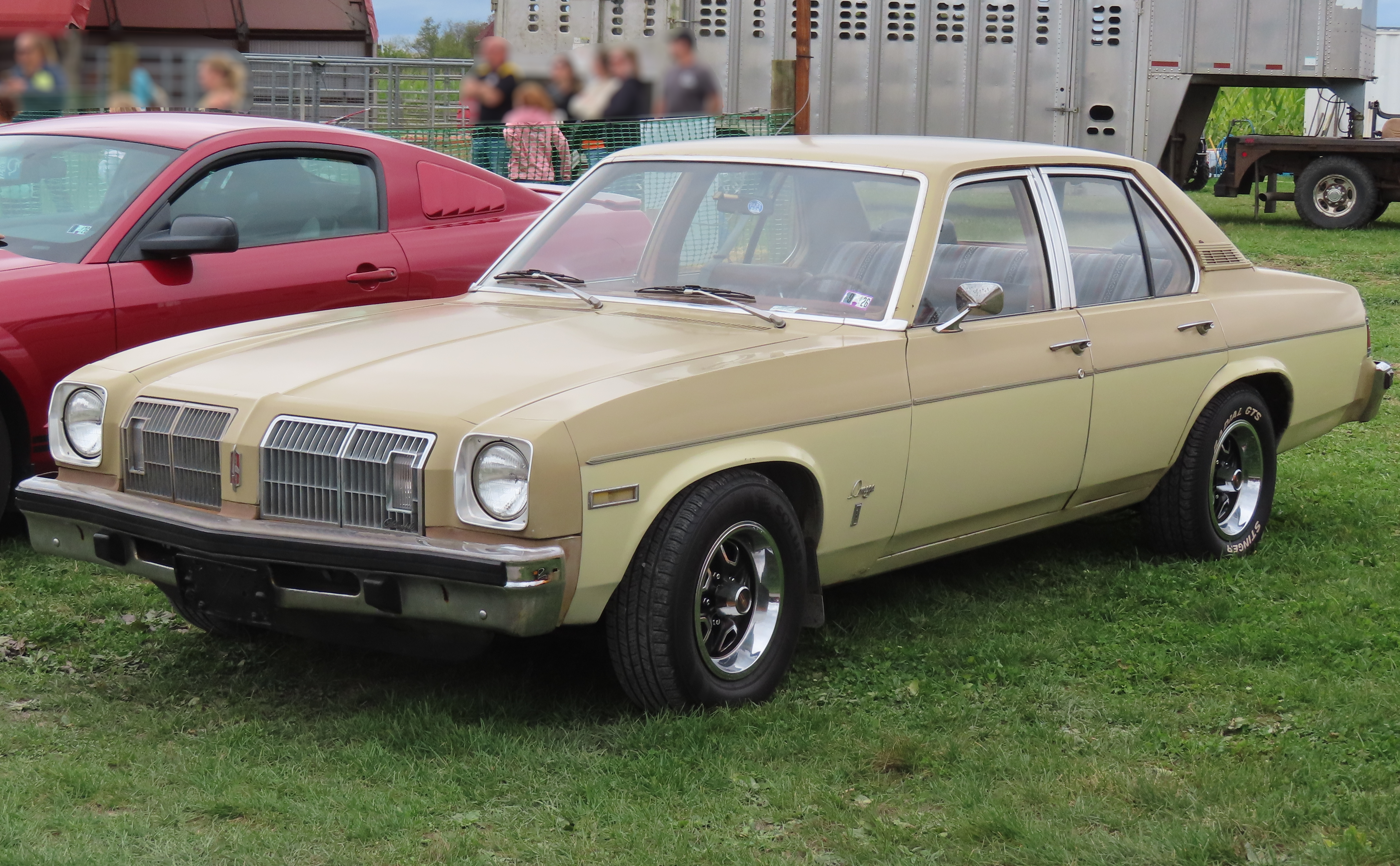
- 1975 Oldsmobile Omega sedan

Overview
- Model years: 1975–1979
- Assembly: Van Nuys Assembly, Van Nuys, California; Willow Run Assembly, Ypsilanti, Michigan

Body and chassis
- Body style: 2-door coupe; 3-door hatchback; 4-door sedan
- Layout: FR layout
- Platform: X-body
- Related: Buick Apollo; Buick Skylark; Chevrolet Nova; Pontiac Phoenix; Pontiac Ventura

Powertrain
- Engine: 250 cu in (4.1 L) Chevrolet I6; 231 cu in (3.8 L) Buick 231 V6; 260 cu in (4.3 L) LV8 V8; 350 cu in (5.7 L) Rocket 350 V8; 350 cu in (5.7 L) Chevrolet LM1 V8

Dimensions
- Wheelbase: 111 in (2,819.4 mm)

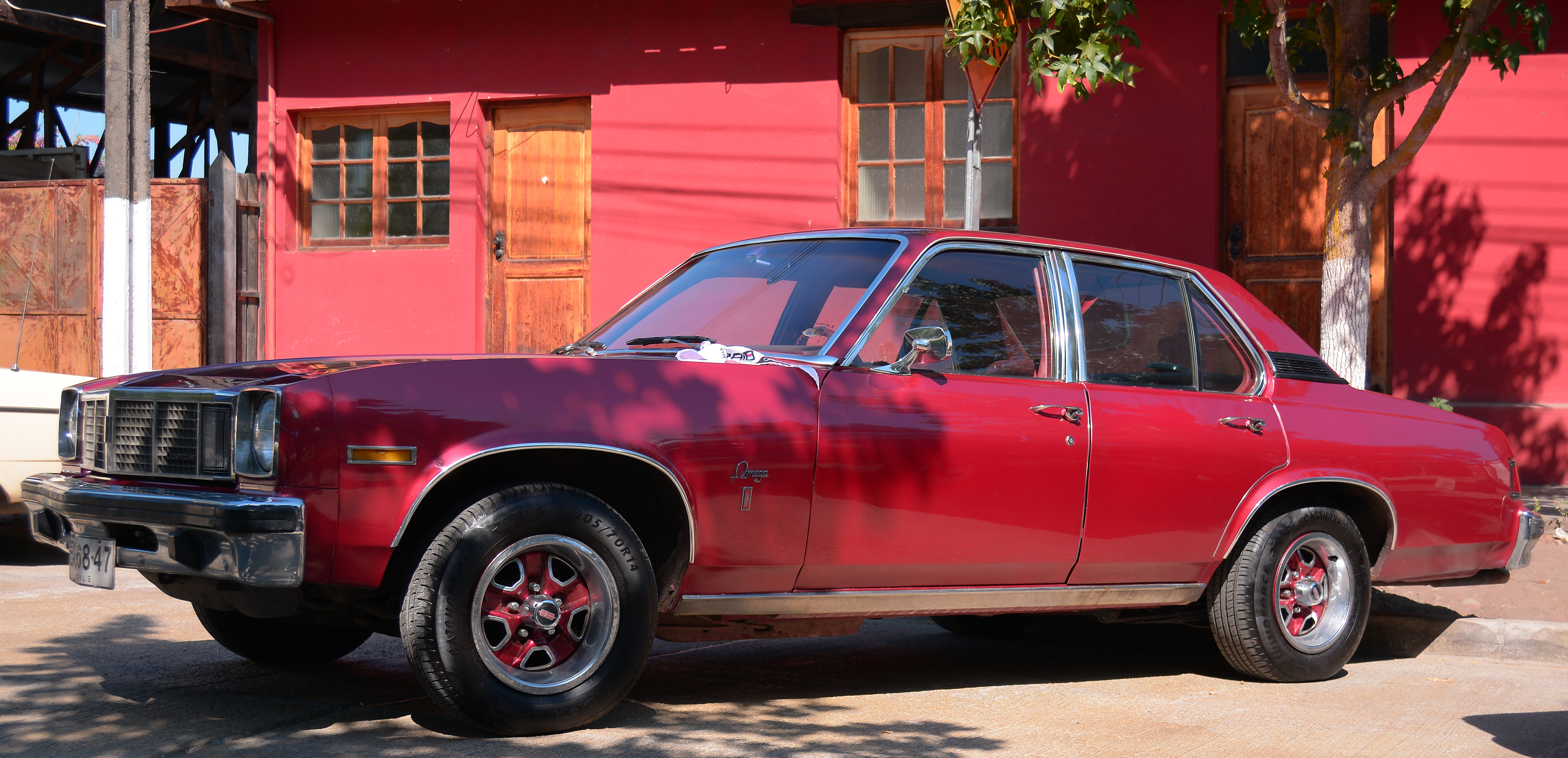
1977 Oldsmobile Omega sedan

This Omega was the top of the X-body line along with Buick's Apollo and Skylark, featuring more luxury trimming, more sound insulation, as well as rear anti-roll bars. The Omega was offered in F-85, Omega, Omega SX, and Omega Brougham trim levels. For model years 1975-76, the top engine choice was a 350 cu. in. (5.7 Liter) V8 from GM's Buick division. The base engine was the 115 hp (86 kW) 250 cu. in. (4.1 Liter) inline-6 from Chevrolet, until 1977 when it was replaced by the lighter 110 hp (82 kW) Buick 231 V6. It saw otherwise few changes during production, notably revisions to the front end (with three different grille designs) and rear lights. The Oldsmobile 260 (4.3-liter) V8 was available as an option from 1975 to 1979.

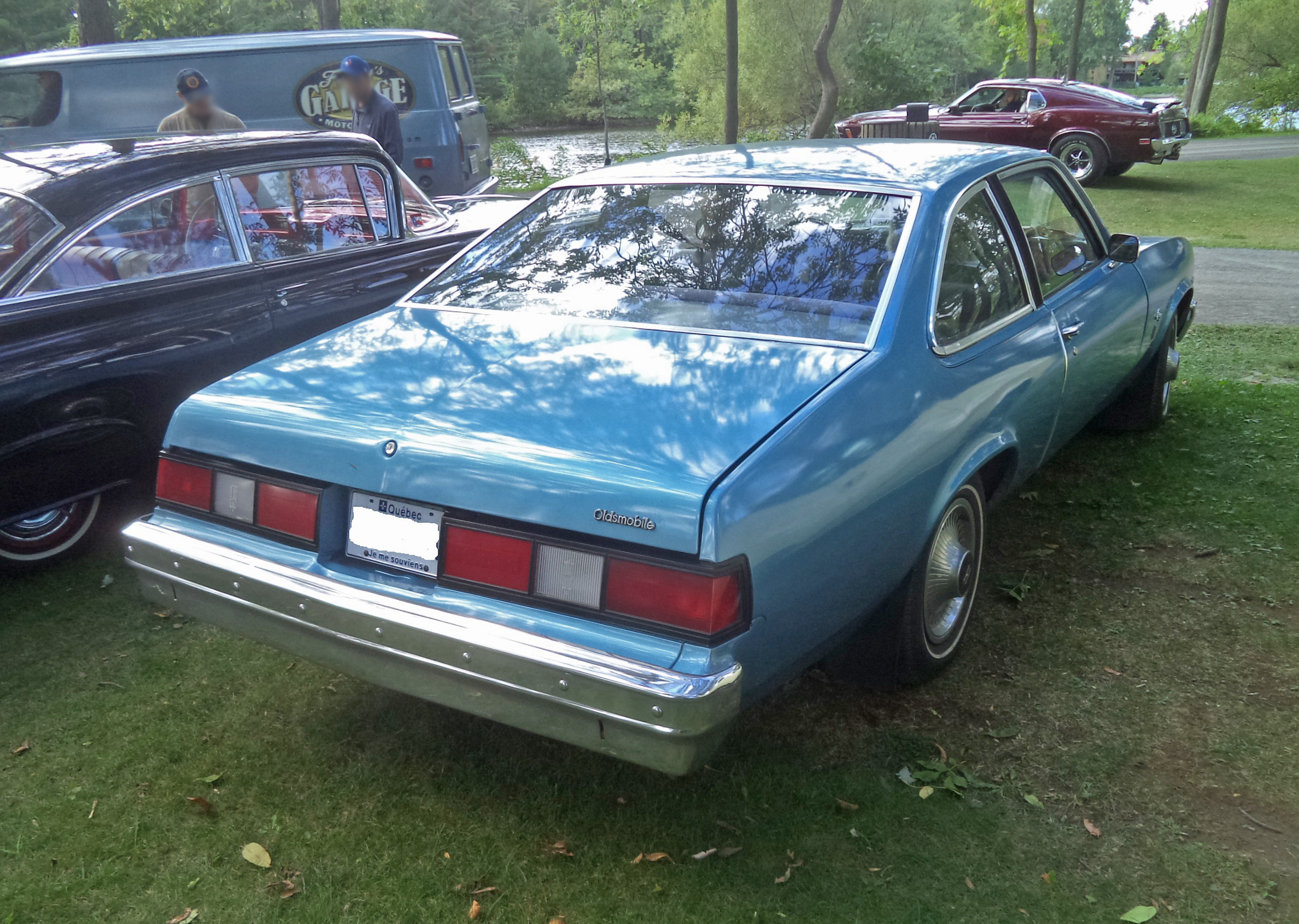
1978 Oldsmobile Omega coupe

== Third generation (1980–1984) ==
Third generation
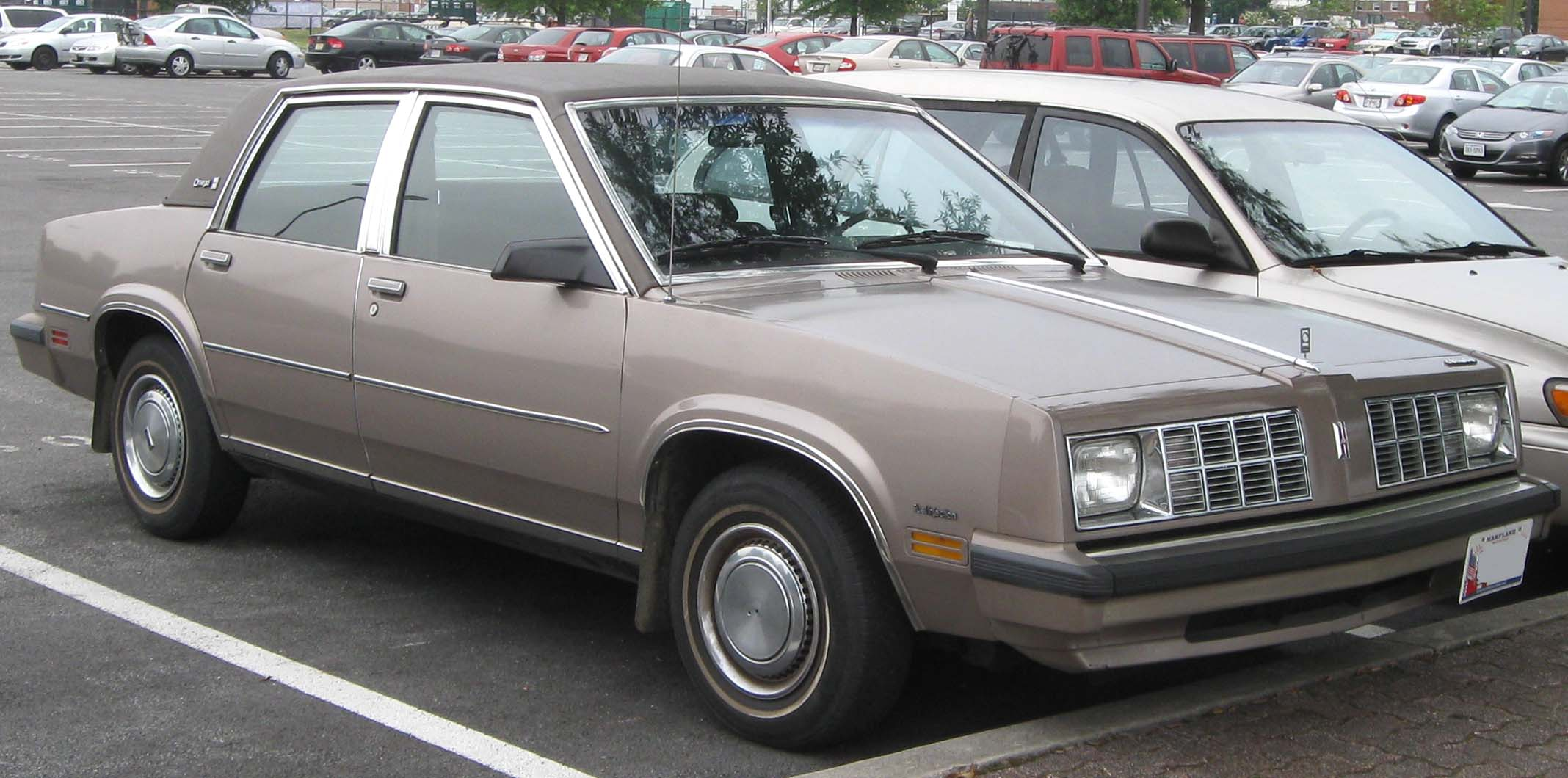
- 1984 Oldsmobile Omega sedan

Overview
- Production: 1979–1984
- Model years: 1980–1984
- Assembly: Willow Run Assembly, Ypsilanti, Michigan

Body and chassis
- Body style: 2-door coupe; 4-door sedan
- Layout: Transverse front-engine, front-wheel-drive
- Platform: X-body
- Related: Buick Skylark; Chevrolet Citation; Pontiac Phoenix

Powertrain
- Engine: 2.5 L Iron Duke I4; 2.8 L LE2 V6; 2.8 L LH7 V6
- Transmission: 3-speed TH-125C automatic; 4-speed manual

Dimensions
- Wheelbase: 105 in (2,667.0 mm)
- Length: 181.8 in (4,617.7 mm)
- Width: 69.8 in (1,772.9 mm)
- Height: 53.7 in (1,364.0 mm)

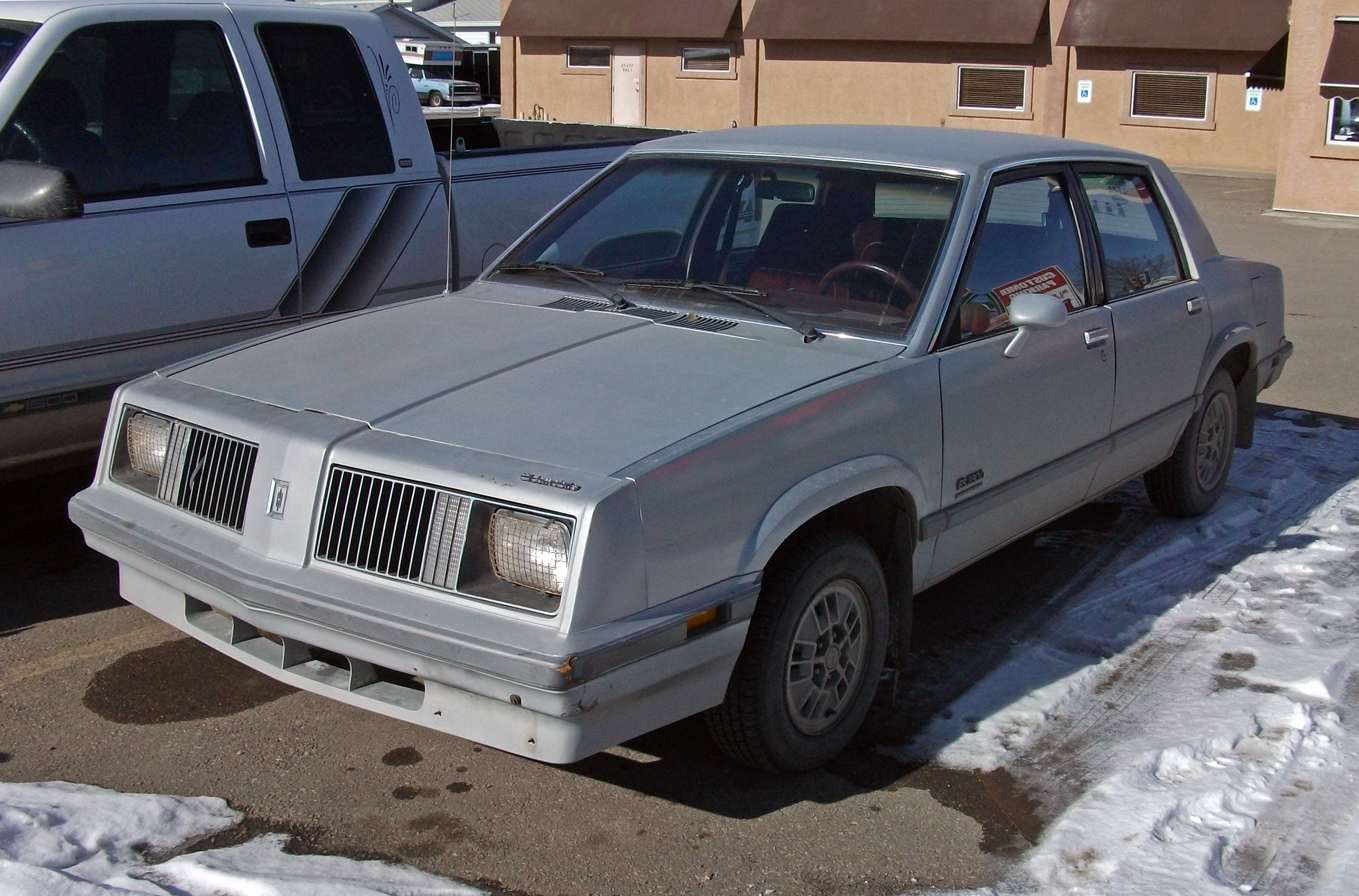
1981 Oldsmobile Omega ES 2800 performance variant

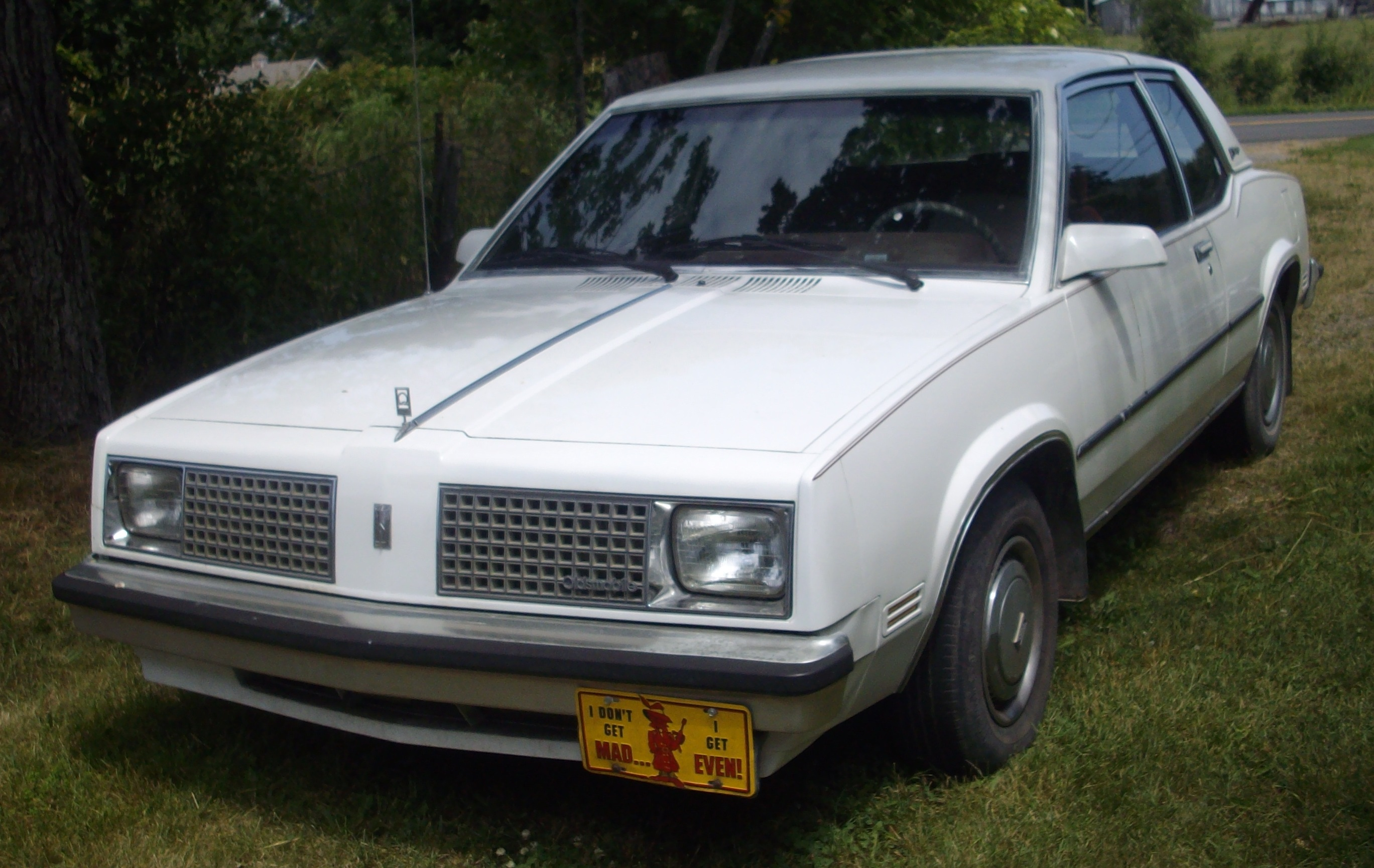
1983 Oldsmobile Omega coupe

The third generation Omega used GM's heavily revised X-body platform, moving from rear- to front-drive for model year 1980. Engine choices included Pontiac's Iron Duke inline-four engine and the new corporate 2.8 L LE2 V6 designed specifically for this platform. Transmissions were the 4 speed manual or the TH125 3-speed automatic.

In contrast to the Chevrolet Citation's fastback configuration, the Omega range included a notchback 2-door coupe and 4-door sedan.

Trim levels included standard and Brougham models as well as the sportier SX coupe (replaced by the ES in 1982), ES sedan. The Sport Omega pioneered urethane plastic fenders in 1981 and featured red-and-orange striping, white-over-gray paint, and a sloping front grille shared with the SX and ES. The sportier models were available with both the L4 and V6 engines.

Beginning in 1982, the Chevrolet high-output (130 horsepower) 2.8L V6 became available on ES models. In 1983, the ES was only available in the sedan body style.

The X-body Omega, like its rebadged variants (the Chevrolet Citation, Pontiac Phoenix and Buick Skylark), proved trouble-prone early on, provoking several recalls for braking problems, fluid leaks and suspension issues. The Omega was the only one of the four X-cars to sell better in 1981 than in 1980 (147,918 versus 134,323), starting in 1982, production fell dramatically. Only 77,469 Omegas were manufactured in '82, with 53,926 in 1983 and 52,986 in 1984.

For 1985, the Omega was replaced by the N-body Calais.
