= Subframe =

Vehicle component

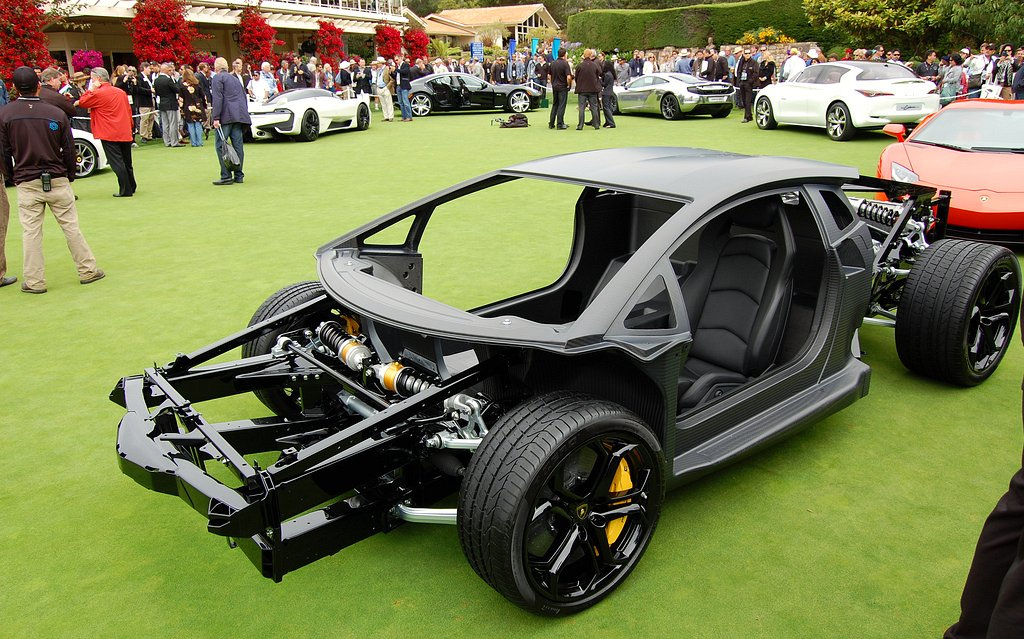
The Lamborghini Aventador has a carbon fibre central monocoque, with front and rear steel subframes, mounting the mechanics.

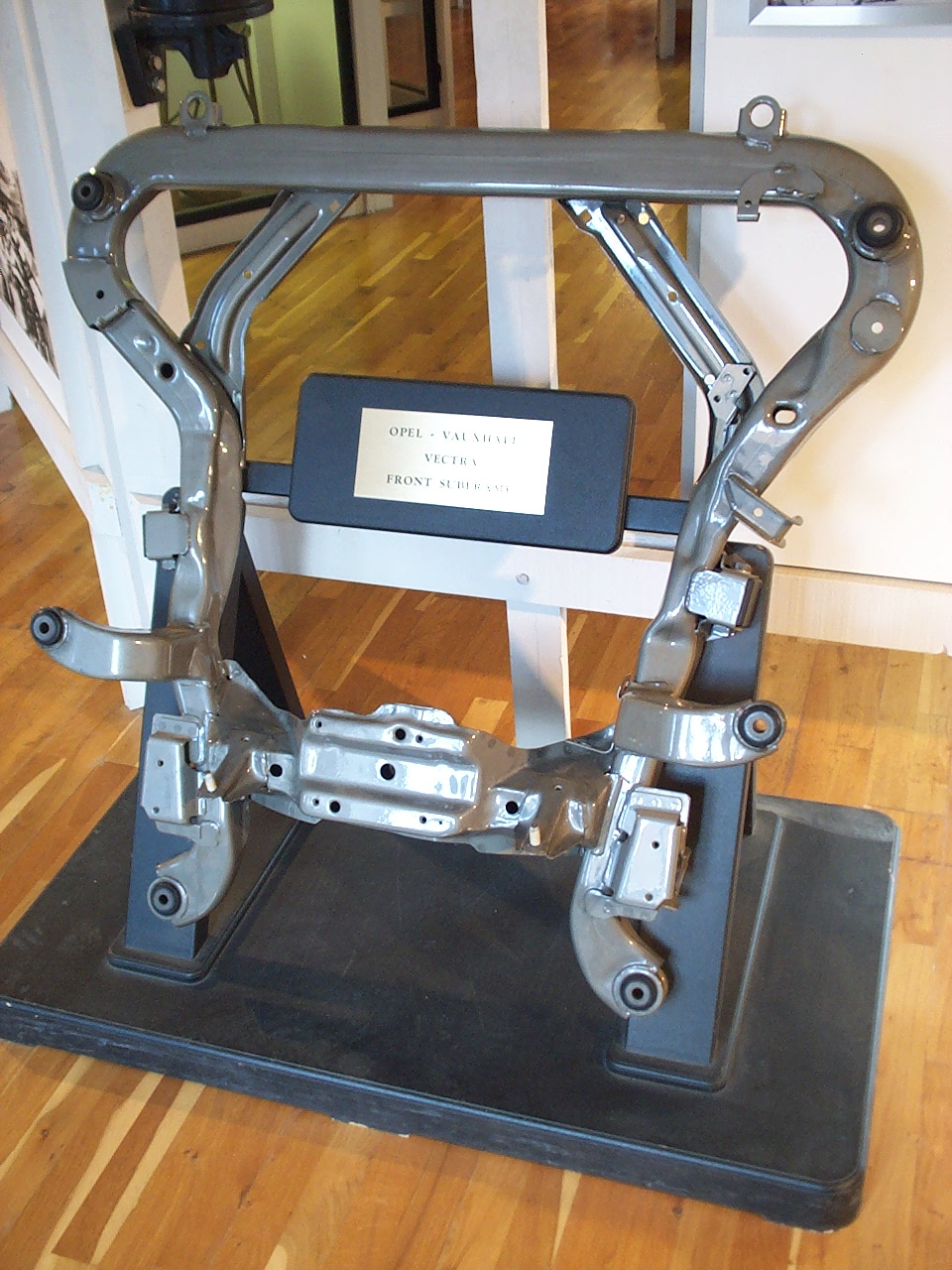
Front subframe of a Vauxhall Vectra on display in Bedford Museum

Animation showing the location of Vehicle Subframes in a CAD Vehicle.

A subframe is a structural component of a vehicle, such as an automobile or an aircraft, that uses a discrete, separate structure within a larger body-on-frame or unibody to carry specific components like the powertrain, drivetrain, and suspension. The subframe is typically bolted or welded to the vehicle. When bolted, it often includes rubber bushings or springs to dampen vibrations.

The primary purposes of using a subframe are to distribute high chassis loads over a wide area of relatively thin sheet metal of a monocoque body shell and to isolate vibrations and harshness from the rest of the body. For example, in an automobile with its powertrain contained in a subframe, forces generated by the engine and transmission can be sufficiently damped to prevent disturbing the passengers. Modern vehicles use separate front and rear subframes to reduce overall weight and cost while maintaining structural integrity. Additionally, subframes benefit production by allowing subassemblies to be created and later introduced to the main body shell on an automated line.

There are generally three basic forms of the subframe:

1. A simple "axle" type, which usually supports the lower control arms and steering rack.
2. A perimeter frame, which supports the lower control arms, steering rack, and engine.
3. A perimeter frame with full support, which supports the lower control arms, steering rack, engine, transmission, and possibly the full suspension, commonly used in front-wheel-drive cars.

Subframes are typically made of pressed steel panels that are thicker than body shell panels and are welded or spot-welded together. Hydroformed tubes may also be used in some designs.

The revolutionary monocoque, transverse-engined, front-wheel-drive 1959 Austin Mini set the template for modern front-wheel-drive cars by using front and rear subframes to provide accurate road wheel control while maintaining a stiff, lightweight body. The 1961 Jaguar E-Type (XKE) used a tubular space frame–type front subframe to mount the engine, gearbox, and long bonnet/hood to a monocoque "tub" passenger compartment. Beginning with the 1960s, subframes saw regular production with General Motors' X- and F-platform bodies, and the Astro/Safari mid-size vans.

Subframes are prone to misalignment, which can cause vibration and alignment issues in the suspension and steering components. Misalignment is caused by space between the mounting bolts and the mounting hole. Several companies in the automotive aftermarket, including TyrolSport in the US and Spoon Sports in Japan, offer solutions for subframe misalignment and movement issues.

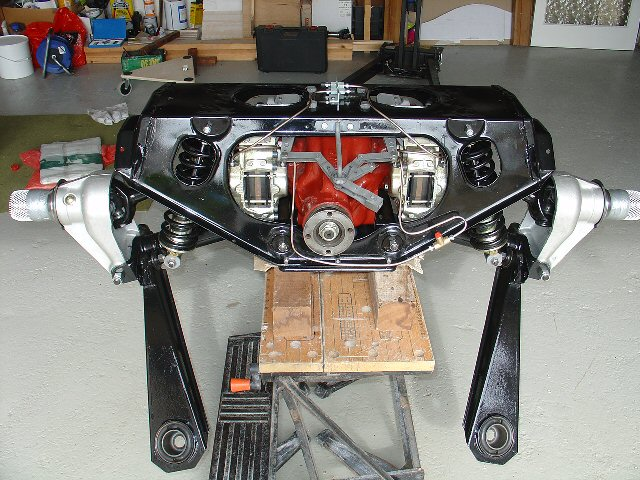
Rear subframe and suspension of a 1963 Jaguar E-Type

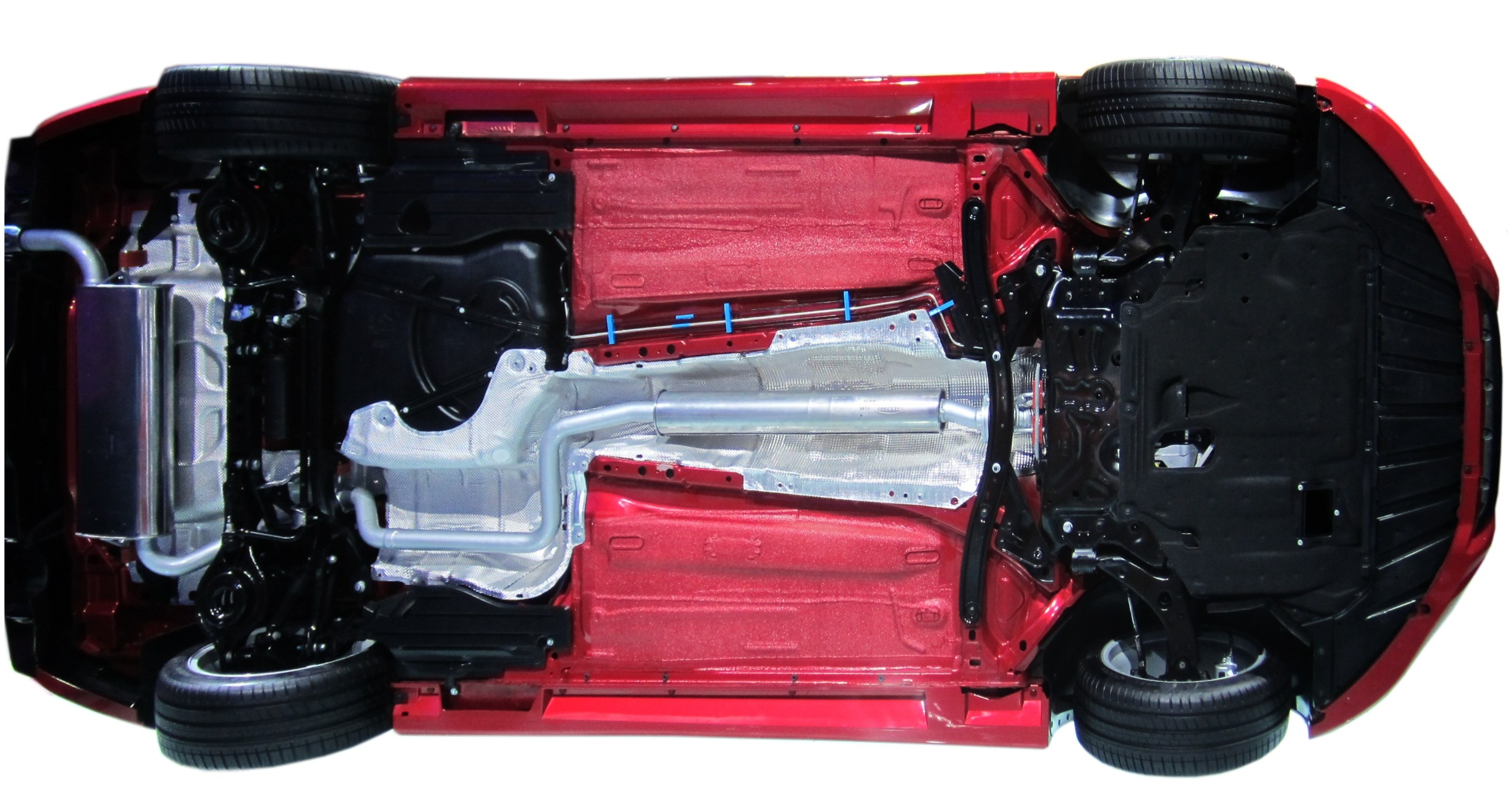
Underbody with front and rear subframes of a 2011 Ford Focus
