= X-Car =

- Maurer AG#Roller_coasters − German Roller coaster
- General Motors X platform − General Motors automobiles
- XCar: Experimental Racing - 1997 racing video game
