= F&P =

F&P may refer to:

- Fisher & Paykel
- F&P Manufacturing
