= Buick Apollo =

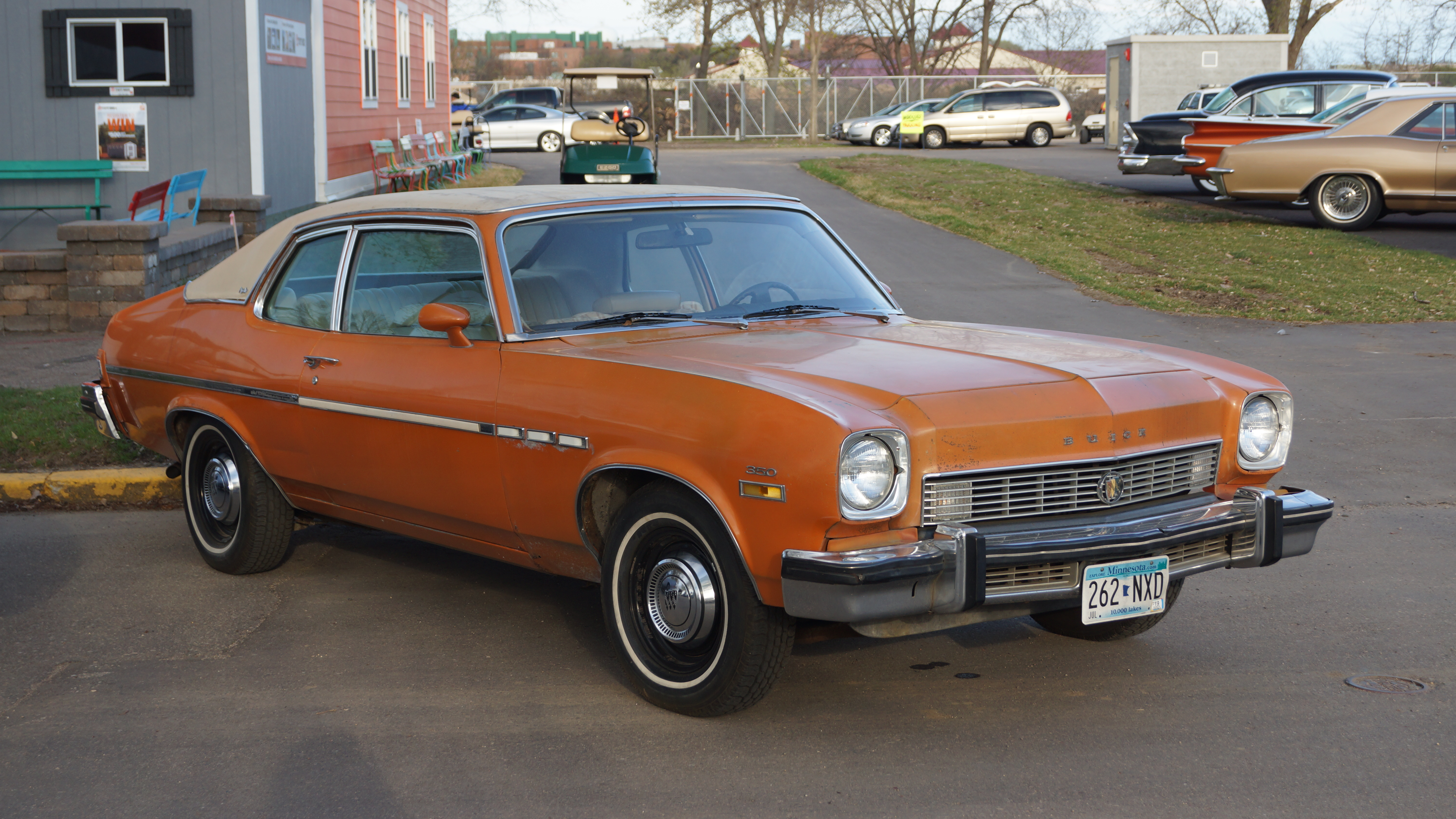
- 1973 Apollo

Overview
- Manufacturer: Buick (General Motors)
- Production: 1973–1975
- Assembly: Leeds Assembly, Leeds, Kansas City, Missouri, U.S. Norwood Assembly, Norwood, Ohio; Van Nuys Assembly, Van Nuys, California, U.S. North Tarrytown New York, U.S. Willow Run Assembly, Ypsilanti, Michigan, U.S. Oshawa, Ontario, Canada

Body and chassis
- Class: Compact car
- Body style: 2-door coupe 2-door hatchback 4-door sedan
- Platform: X-body
- Related: Chevrolet Nova; Pontiac Ventura; Pontiac Phoenix; Oldsmobile Omega

Powertrain
- Engine: 250 cu in (4.1 L) Chevrolet I6; 350 cu in (5.7 L) Buick V8
- Transmission: 3-speed manual 3-speed THM350 automatic

Dimensions
- Wheelbase: 111 in (2,819 mm)
- Length: 200.2 in (5,085 mm)
- Width: 72.7 in (1,847 mm)

Chronology
- Predecessor: Buick Special
- Successor: Buick Skylark (1976)

The Buick Apollo is a compact car that was manufactured from 1973 to 1975 by General Motors for its Buick division. It was based on the GM X platform along with the Oldsmobile Omega, Chevrolet Nova, and the Pontiac Ventura. The car was named for the Greek god Apollo.

It was available as a coupe, two-door hatchback, or four-door sedan. The two-door models were renamed Skylark for 1975; only the sedan carried the Apollo nameplate for that year. A total of 112,901 Apollos were built.

== Overview ==
The Apollo was powered by a standard 250-cubic-inch (4.1 L) Chevrolet inline six or an optional 350-cubic-inch (5.7 L) Buick V8, available with either a two- or four-barrel carburetor. A three-speed manual transmission was standard, with a three-speed Turbo-Hydramatic optional. The Oldsmobile 260 was added as the base V8 option for 1975.

Standard equipment on the Apollo included a semi-closed cooling system, manual brakes with finned front drums, coil spring front suspension with stabilizer bar, extensive use of insulation and sound deadening materials, flow-through ventilation system, full-foam seats, front and rear ashtrays, reinforced front bumpers, carpeting, roof drip moldings, and front and rear wheel opening moldings.

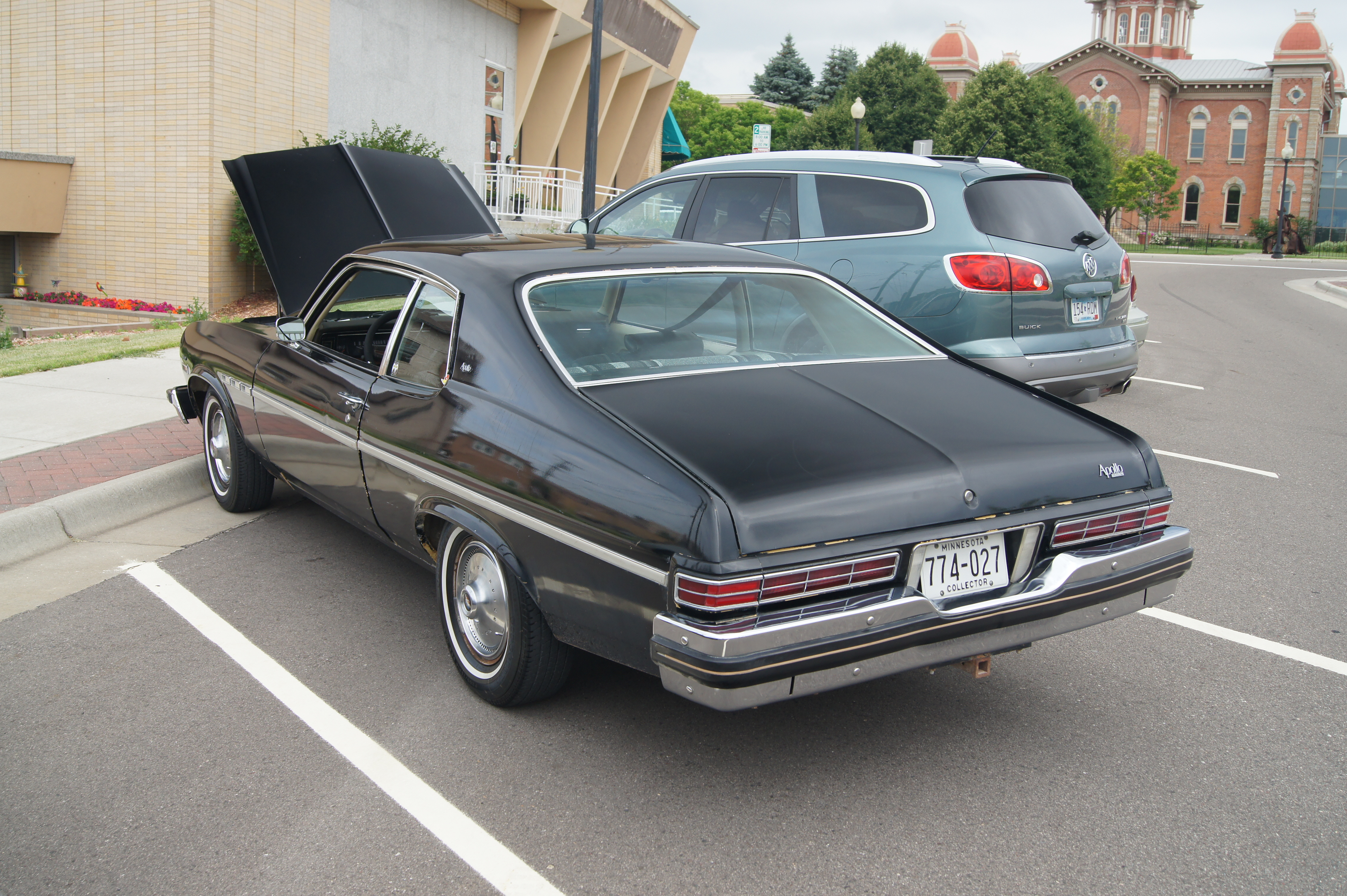
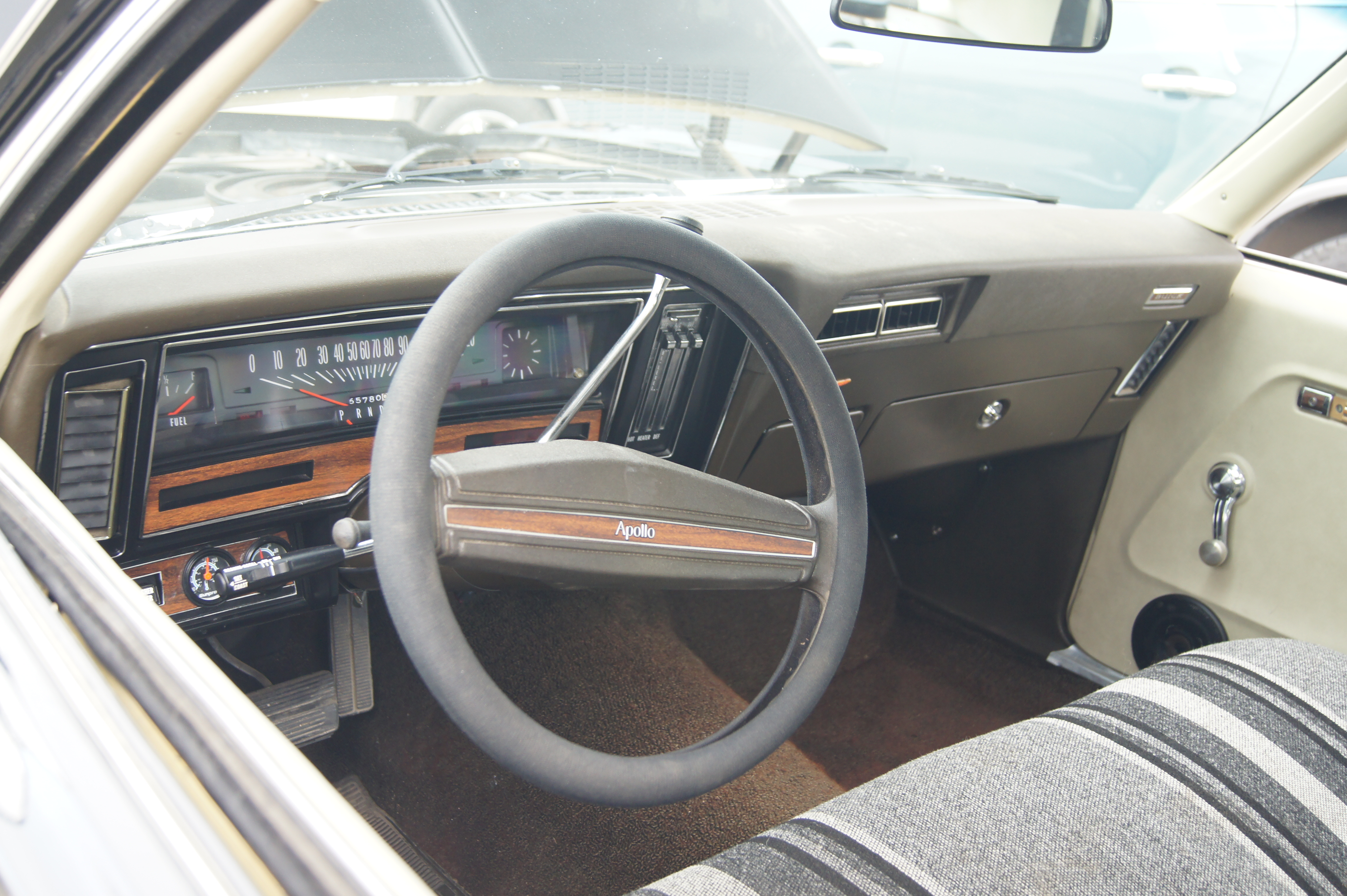
1973 Apollo rear and interior

Options included variable-ratio power steering, power drum or power front disc brakes, E78x14 bias-belted tires, custom cloth interior trim, convenience center storage compartment, tilt steering wheel, climate control air conditioning with low Freon detector switch, rear window defogger (blower), tinted glass, sport mirrors with drivers remote control, bumper protective strips with white accent stripe- front and rear, bumper guards front and rear, color-coordinated body protective side moldings, deluxe wheel covers, deluxe wire wheel covers, chrome-plated styled wheels (Buick rally wheels) and a custom vinyl top. Steel-belted tires were introduced in 1975.

There was no conventional antenna mounted on the body of the car. Instead, two wires were embedded in the layers of glass in the windshield.

The 1974 Apollo debuted with only subtle differences. A chrome strip above the grille and roof-mounted safety restraints were added. A GSX package became available on the coupe for 1974, however, it was purely cosmetic changes, lacking the performance upgrades that distinguished it in previous years. It was available in red or white and featured a blacked-out grille, unique striping, white vinyl bucket seats with red interior accents, and wire wheel covers. The GSX was available with the straight six or either 350 V8, and could be ordered with any of the optional equipment available to other Apollo models.

The 1975 Apollo was only available as a four-door sedan and adopted the redesigned X-body shell with a boxier European look which replaced the former Coke-bottle shape. For 1976, the Apollo nameplate was dropped entirely, with the sedan renamed Skylark to rejoin the coupe and hatchback.
