= General Motors L platform =

GM L platform
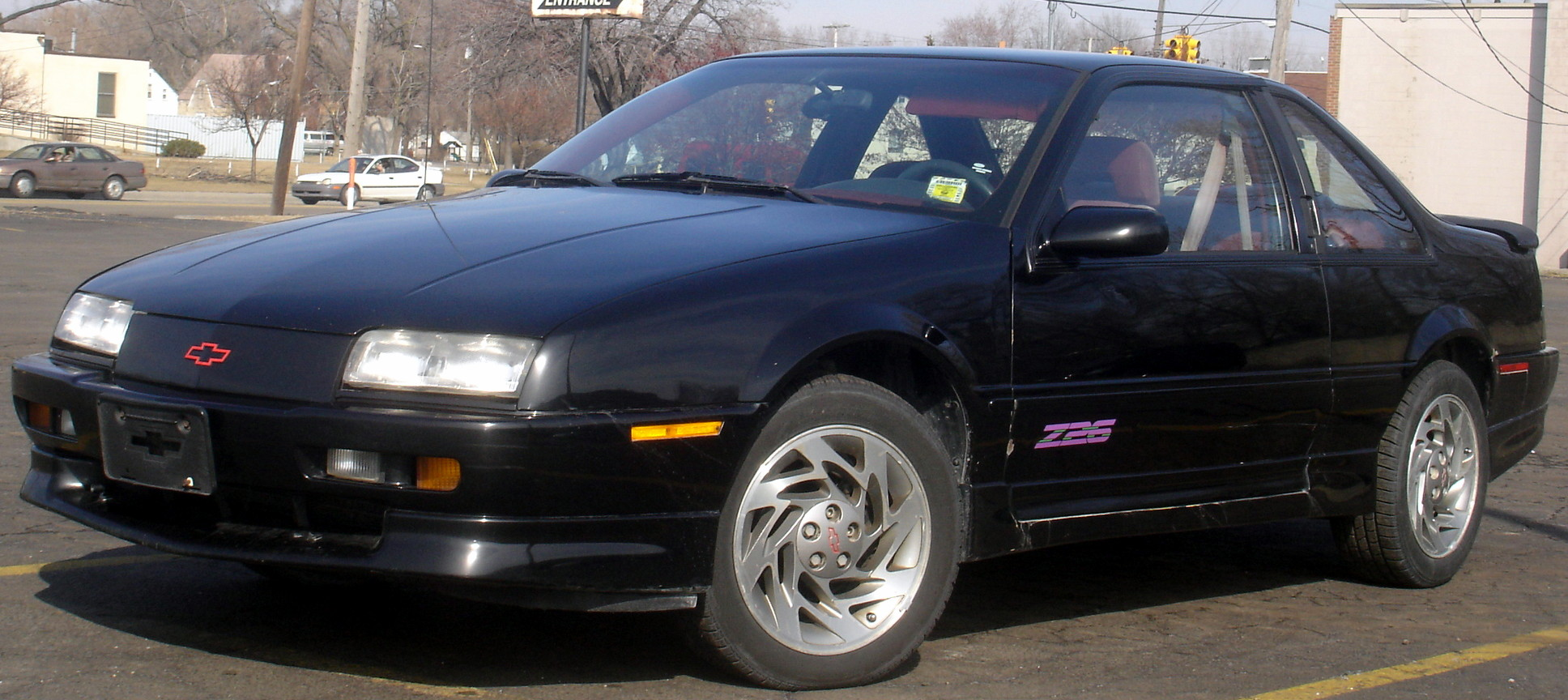
- 1994 Chevrolet Beretta Z26

Overview
- Manufacturer: General Motors
- Also called: L-body; L car
- Production: 1987–1996

Body and chassis
- Class: Compact (C) platform
- Layout: FF layout
- Body style(s): 2-door coupe 4-door sedan 5-door hatchback
- Vehicles: Chevrolet Beretta; Chevrolet Corsica; Pontiac Tempest
- Related: GM N platform GM J platform

Powertrain
- Engine(s): 122 I4; Quad-4 I4; 60° V6
- Transmission(s): 3-speed 3T40 automatic 4-speed 4T40-E automatic 4-speed 4T60-E automatic 5-speed Getrag 282 manual

Dimensions
- Wheelbase: 103.4 in (2,626 mm)

Chronology
- Predecessor: GM X platform (FWD)
- Successor: 2nd generation GM N Platform

The General Motors L platform (commonly called the L-body or L car) was a front-wheel-drive compact car automotive platform that was produced from 1987 through 1996.

The L platform was very similar to the GM N platform; however, the first-generation N-cars were engineered by Oldsmobile, while the L-cars were engineered by Chevrolet. The L platform used a twist-beam rear suspension and MacPherson struts in the front and featured a 103.4 in (263 cm) wheelbase. Both platforms were used to replace the GM X platform on which the Citation, among others, were based. GM also used a different L platform for the all-wheel-drive versions of the Chevrolet Astro/GMC Safari mid-size vans.

== Canadian Pontiac Tempest ==
Pontiac sold its own version of the L-body in Canada only. It was marketed as the Tempest from 1987 to 1991. This model featured a unique grill and tail lamps (which were later used on the updated Corsica). This model was dropped after 1991, being replaced by the new 1992 Grand Am sedan.

The L-car lasted just one generation, with the nameplates being retired and replaced by the N-body Chevrolet Malibu.

This platform was the basis for the following vehicles:

- 1987–1996 Chevrolet Beretta
- 1987–1996 Chevrolet Corsica
- 1987–1991 Pontiac Tempest (Canada)

== See also ==
- List of GM platforms
