= General Motors X platform (FWD) =

GM X platform (FWD)
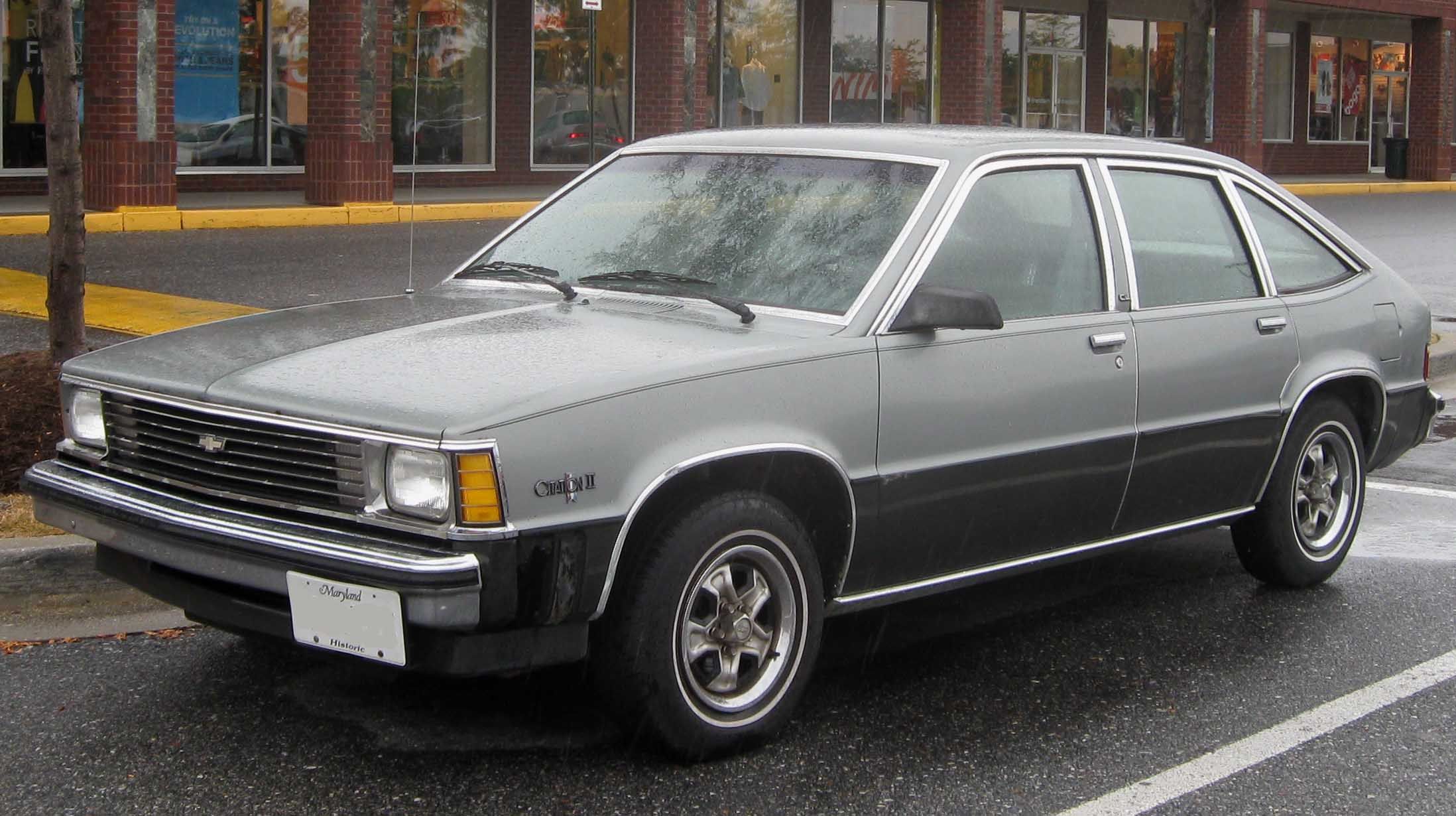

Overview
- Manufacturer: General Motors
- Also called: X-body
- Production: 1979–1985

Body and chassis
- Class: Compact
- Layout: Front engine, front-wheel drive
- Body styles: 2-door notchback coupé 3-door hatchback 4-door notchback sedan 5-door hatchback
- Vehicles: Chevrolet Citation; Oldsmobile Omega; Pontiac Phoenix; Buick Skylark
- Related: GM A platform (FWD)

Powertrain
- Engines: 2.5 L Iron Duke I4; 2.8 L 60° V6
- Transmissions: 3-speed TH 125 automatic 4-speed manual

Dimensions
- Wheelbase: 104.9 in (2,664 mm)

Chronology
- Predecessor: GM X platform (RWD)
- Successor: GM N platform GM L platform

The General Motors front-wheel drive X platform was used for the company's compact cars for model years 1980-1985, superseding the earlier, similarly designated, rear-drive platform.

After front-wheel drive cars had become somewhat common in the North American market, first through foreign imports, and then by American-badged but wholly or partially foreign-developed cars (e.g., the Ford Fiesta and Dodge Omni), GM's X-bodies were the first American-developed front-wheel drive cars introduced for the high-volume, mainstream market. GM would subsequently migrate most of its mainstream platforms to front-wheel drive.

Where numerous earlier American front-wheel drive cars were aimed at the luxury market and manufactured in relatively small numbers, the GM X bodies offered an alternative to high volume imported front-wheel drive compacts—and initially met considerable sales success. GM's X-body models — the 1980–1985 Chevrolet Citation, 1980–1984 Oldsmobile Omega, 1980–1984 Pontiac Phoenix and 1980–1985 Buick Skylark — became synonymous with their design defects and GM's mishandled response.

Subsequently, the X platform was modified to become the intermediate FWD GM A-body that proved successful. The X platform was also superseded by the L-body and N-body platforms, derived from the J-body platform.

== Design defects ==
For General Motors, the transverse front-drive configuration had represented uncharted engineering territory, at a time when the company had begun reorganizing and begun using a new engineering approach, with its divisions responsible for a single aspect of the design rather than an integrated whole. After a significantly compressed design development, the X-bodies entered production and sales—and the design's most prominent engineering deficiency, the rear brakes, became obvious.

In 1979, during even the first months of manufacture, GM made a number of revisions to the car's braking system. Automotive journalists and reviewers noted in the autumn of 1979 rear wheels' tendency to lock upon heavy braking, including in emergency situations, a potentially dangerous behavior compromising vehicle control. In the first year of manufacture, hundreds of complaints noted rear brake locking, with dozens of related accidents and injuries including one death—the latter triggering a lawsuit. The National Highway Traffic Safety Administration (NHTSA) pressured General Motors for remedial action.

GM issued a voluntary, though unpublicized, recall to modify the brake proportioning valve of only the earliest manual transmission models: less than 50,000 of the already more than one million X cars on the road. While remaining publicly silent on the safety implications of the brake design, leaked internal documents demonstrated that GM's engineering staff were dubious that the valve modification would suffice, even for the cars subject to the recall, recommending further changes to the brake linings and brake drums that could raise the cost per vehicle by $70–150, while applying to a far greater number of vehicles.

More complaints, accidents, injuries, and lawsuits ensued, including cars which had earlier been recalled and modified, as well as cars from the 1981 model year. This caused the NHTSA to pressure GM for further action, preferably a recall of all 1.1 million vehicles in the 1980 model year for replacement of the brake proportioning valves, brake linings and drums.

GM responded in 1983 with a voluntary recall of only all manual transmission vehicles of that year and the very earliest automatic transmission cars, a total of fewer than 250,000 vehicles, including those addressed in the first recall. NHTSA sued GM, demanding a recall of the entire 1980 model year, claiming the company had known as far back as 1978 of the cars' tendency to lock rear brakes, and had provided misleading and incomplete answers to NHTSA's investigation.

Though the NHTSA had logged 4,282 complaints, including 1,417 accidents, 427 injuries and 18 fatalities, the presiding judge dismissed the suit in 1987, ruling that NHTSA had filed the suit prematurely, and had relied mainly on anecdotal evidence, without properly developing conclusive evidence or holding investigative hearings.

The openly contentious back and forth not only damaged the reputation of the X cars, but the reputation of General Motors itself—with one report noting that the X-car was "one of the malaziest cars" of the Malaise era, doing enormous damage to GM's reputation and playing a role in "the sharpest decrease in American market share" General Motors would experience in the 1980s.

The intermediate FWD GM A-body, heavily derived from the X platform, did not suffer the same reputation, and GM would significantly delay the introduction of its subsequent full size transverse engine FWD C and H platform vehicles, in the face of engineering issues.

== See also ==
- List of General Motors platforms
- General Motors X platform
