= Pontiac Phoenix =

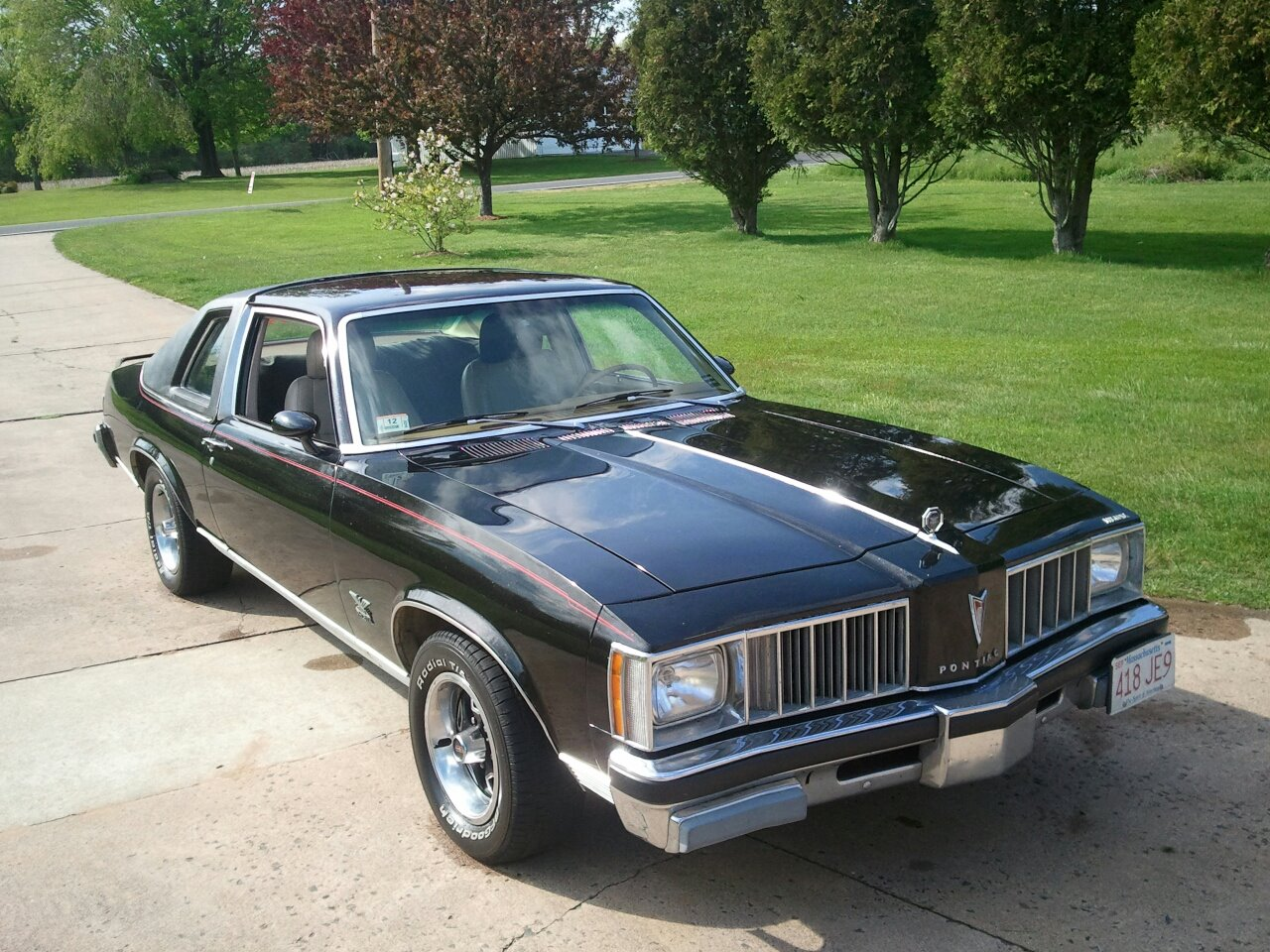

Overview
- Manufacturer: Pontiac
- Model years: 1977–1984

Body and chassis
- Class: Compact

Chronology
- Predecessor: Pontiac Ventura
- Successor: Pontiac Grand Am

The Pontiac Phoenix was a compact car that was sold from 1977 to 1984 by Pontiac. There were two generations of the Phoenix, both based on popular Chevrolet models, and both using the GM X platform designation. It was named for the mythological Phoenix, which would die in a self-inflicted fire and be reborn from the ashes. The Phoenix was replaced by the Grand Am in 1985.

== First generation (1977–1979) ==
First generation
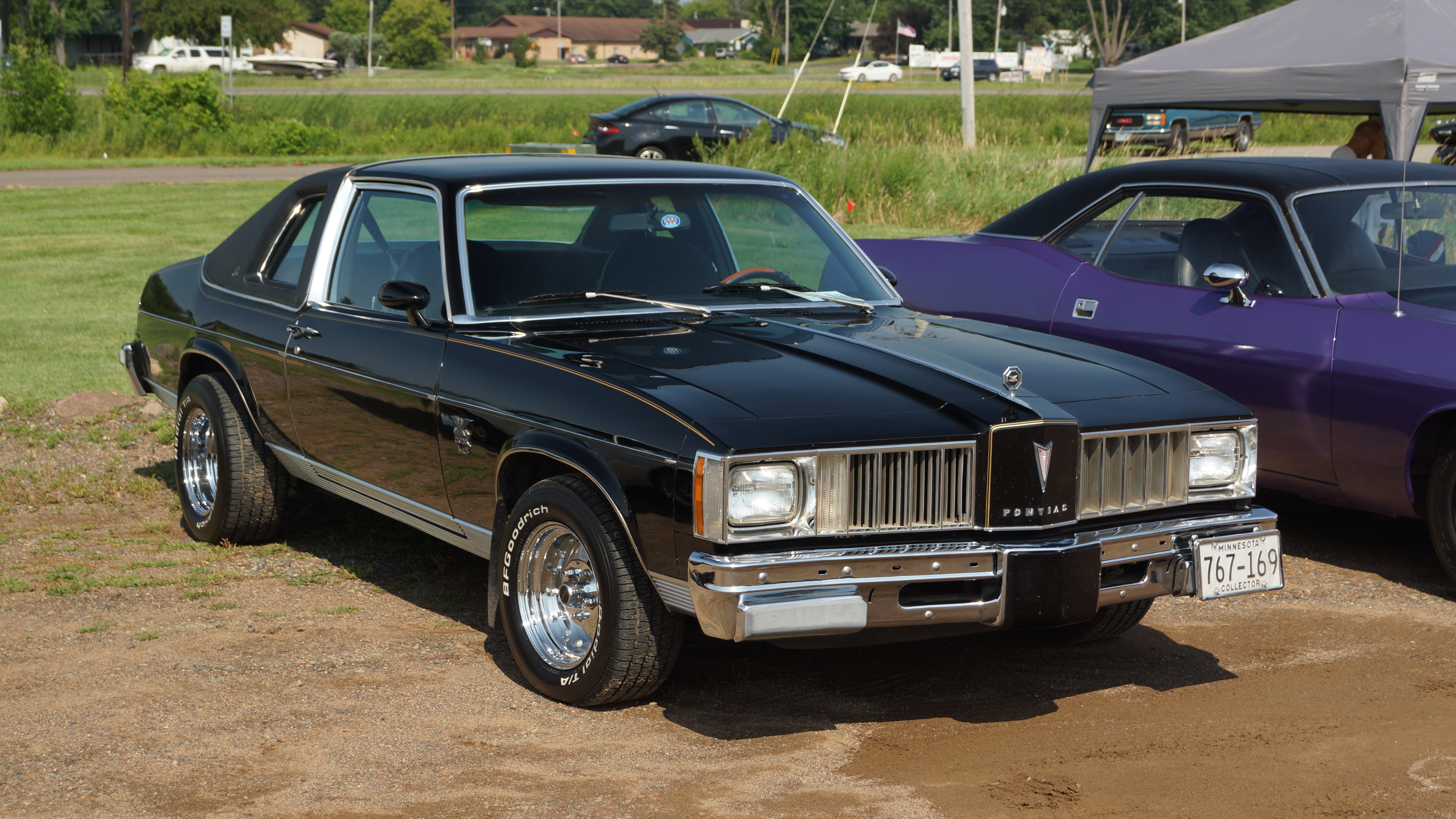
- 1978 Pontiac Phoenix LJ Coupe

Overview
- Production: 1976–1979
- Model years: 1977–1979
- Assembly: North Tarrytown Assembly, Tarrytown, New York; Willow Run Assembly, Ypsilanti, Michigan

Body and chassis
- Body style: 2-door coupe 3-door hatchback 4-door sedan
- Layout: Front-engine, rear-wheel drive
- Platform: X-body
- Related: Chevrolet Nova; Oldsmobile Omega; Buick Skylark

Powertrain
- Engine: 151 cu in (2.5 L) Iron Duke I4; 231 cu in (3.8 L) Buick V6; 305 cu in (5.0 L) Chevrolet LG3 V8; 350 cu in (5.7 L) Chevrolet 350 V8
- Transmission: 3-speed manual 4-speed manual 3-speed THM350 automatic

Dimensions
- Wheelbase: 111.1 in (2,821.9 mm)
- Length: 203.4 in (5,166.4 mm)
- Width: 72.4 in (1,839.0 mm)

The rear-wheel drive Phoenix was introduced for 1977 as an upscale version of the Pontiac Ventura, and replaced the Ventura entirely for 1978. The Phoenix differed from the Ventura in only minor details such as the grille and its square headlights and yellow rear turn signals. The Phoenix was available as a 2-door coupe or a 4-door sedan, with a 3-door hatchback available beginning in 1978. There were two trim levels available, the base and LJ, with a performance-oriented SJ package as an option.

Available engines included Pontiac's then-new 151 cu in (2.5 L) Iron Duke I4, a 110 hp (82 kW) 231 cu in (3.8 L) Buick V6, a 140 hp (104 kW) 305 cu in (5.0 L) Chevrolet LG3 V8, and a 350 cu in (5.7 L) Chevrolet V8. Transmission choices included a 3-speed manual (available with either column or floor shift), 4-speed manual, or a 3-speed Turbo-Hydramatic automatic.

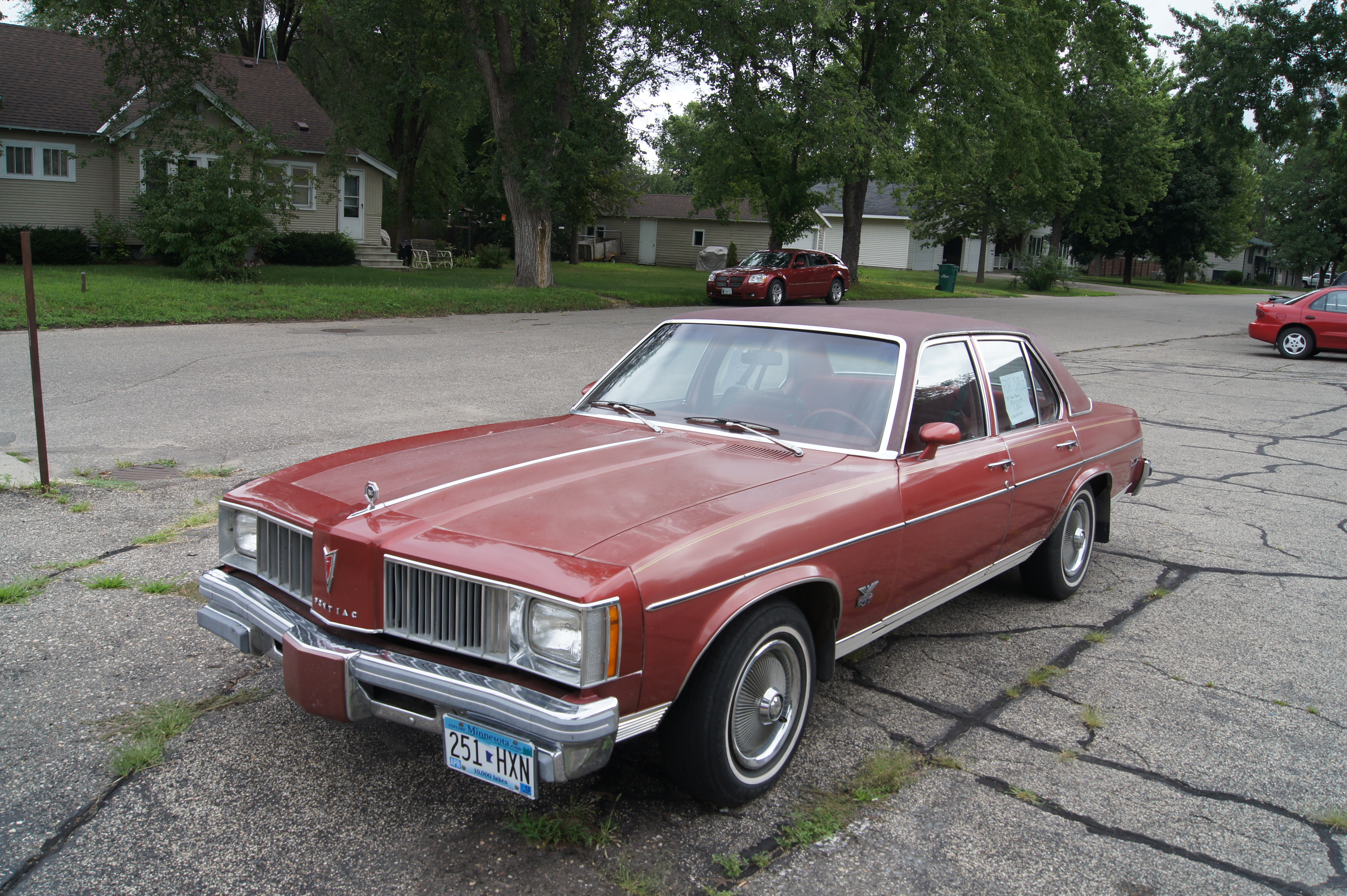
1977 Pontiac Phoenix 4-door Sedan

== Second generation (1980–1984) ==
Second generation
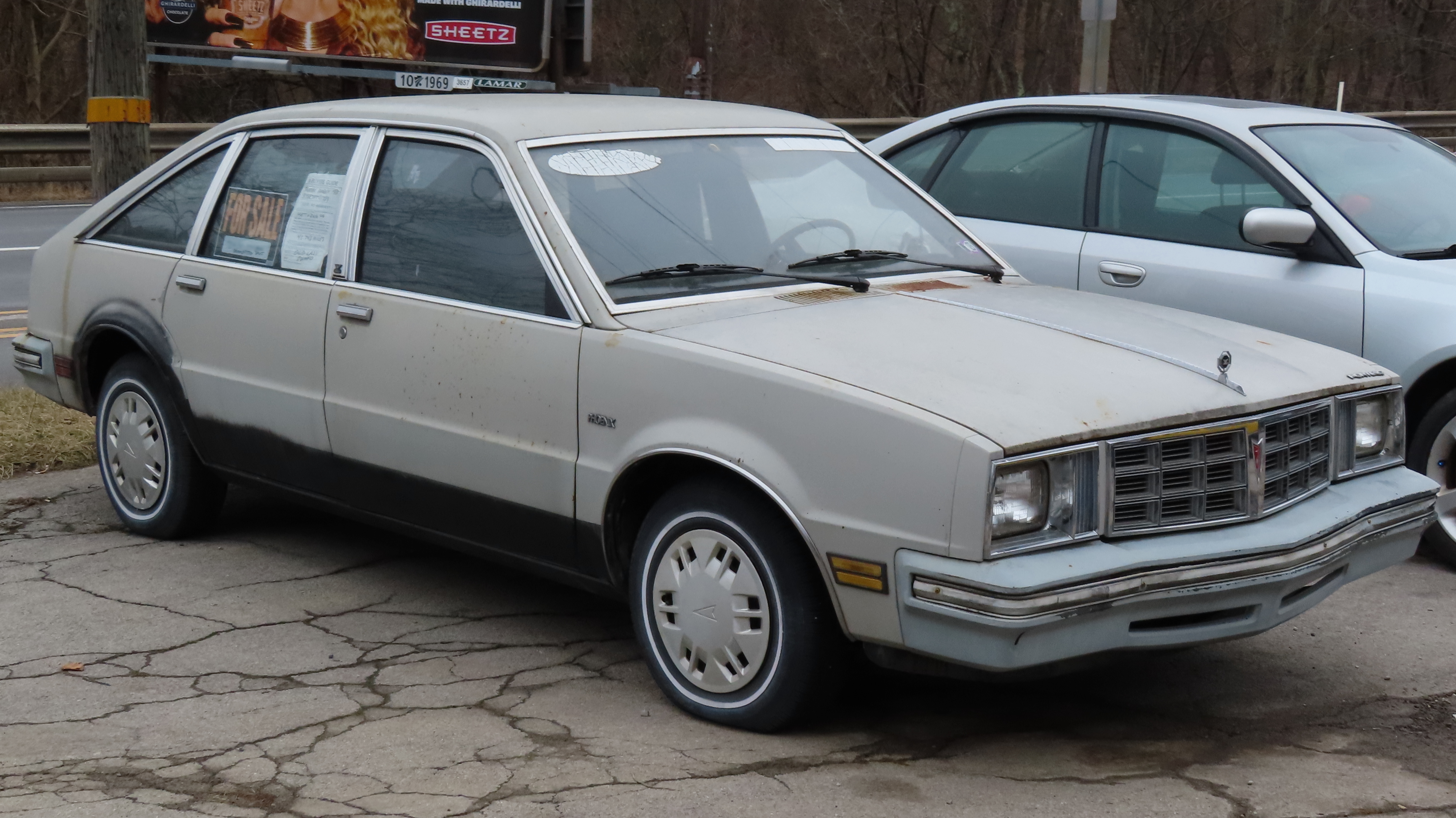
- 1980 Phoenix hatchback

Overview
- Production: 1979–1984
- Model years: 1980–1984
- Assembly: Oklahoma City Assembly, Oklahoma City, Oklahoma; North Tarrytown Assembly, North Tarrytown, New York

Body and chassis
- Body style: 2-door coupe 5-door hatchback
- Layout: Transverse front-engine, front-wheel drive
- Platform: X-body
- Related: Chevrolet Citation; Oldsmobile Omega; Buick Skylark

Powertrain
- Engine: 2.5 L Iron Duke I4; 2.8 L LE2 V6; 2.8 L LH7 V6
- Transmission: 4-speed manual 3-speed TH125 automatic

Dimensions
- Wheelbase: 104.9 in (2,664.5 mm)

For 1980, the Phoenix was downsized and moved to the front-wheel drive X platform, and was available as a 2-door coupe or a 5-door hatchback. It was the first front-wheel drive production model from Pontiac. The base and LJ models were still available for this generation, as was the SJ trim package; the SJ package was made as a full trim level for 1982. There was a minor exterior refresh and a new PJ model for 1983, followed by a name change for the LJ and SJ to LE and SE, respectively, for the 1984 model year.

Available engines were a 2.5 L Iron Duke 4-cylinder, carried over from the previous Phoenix, and a new 2.8 L LE2 V6, both of which were mated to a standard 4-speed manual transmission or optional 3-speed automatic. The high-output 2.8 L LH7 V6 was standard on the Phoenix SJ/SE for 1982 and was available as an option for all other Phoenix models.

As with its sister cars (the Chevrolet Citation, Buick Skylark and Oldsmobile Omega), the Phoenix's image suffered because of poor workmanship, two recalls for 1981, and a dangerous tendency for the car to lock the rear wheels upon emergency braking (1980 models only).

The Phoenix was replaced for 1985 by a revived Grand Am on the front-wheel drive GM N-body platform, while the Phoenix's basic architecture lived on under the A-body Pontiac 6000, which was introduced in 1982.
