= Willow Run Assembly =

- Operated: 1959–1993
- Location: 2625 Tyler Road; Willow Run
- Coordinates: 42°13′58″N 83°33′21″W
- Industry: Automotive
- Products: Automobiles
- Owner: General Motors

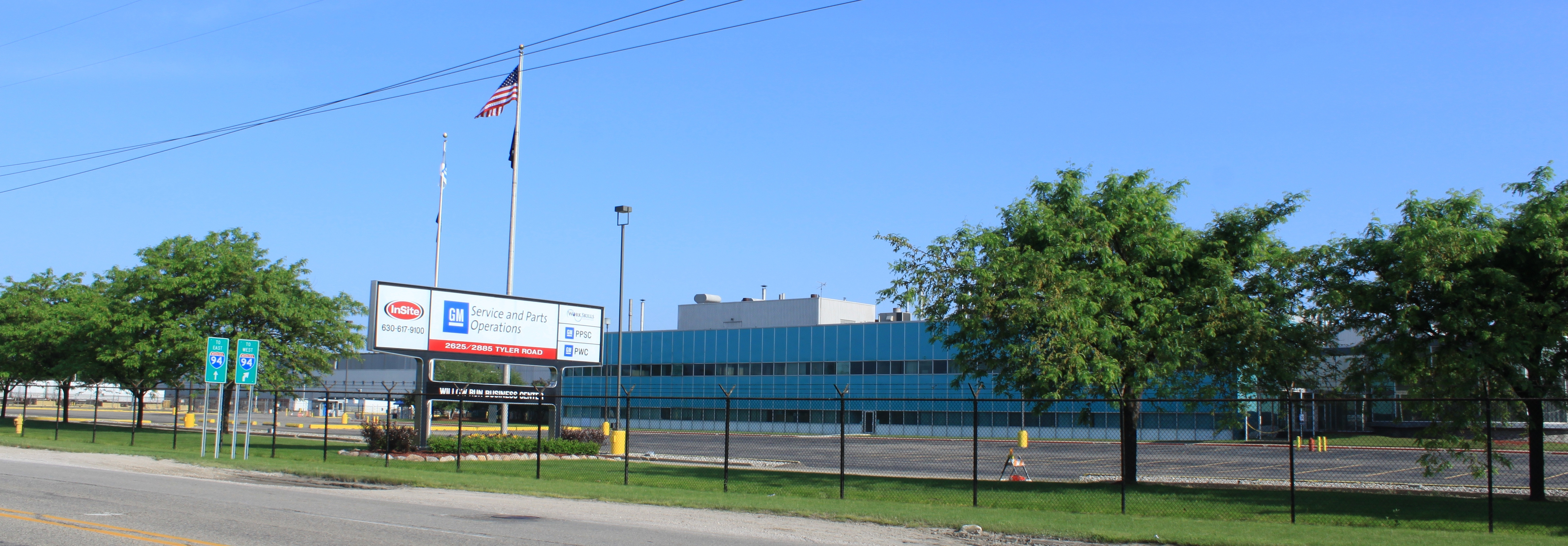
Willow Run Business Center (the former Willow Run Assembly) as seen in 2011

Willow Run Assembly was a General Motors automobile factory near Ypsilanti, Michigan, located at 2625 Tyler Road, in the Willow Run manufacturing complex. Willow Run Assembly consisted of an assembly plant of 2.3 million square feet, another building that was known in later years as "Willow Run Company Vehicle Operations", covering 23,000 square feet on 22 acres of land, and perhaps other parcels. Willow Run Assembly was to the south of the former Willow Run Transmission, the site of the bomber plant built by Ford in 1941.

Production of automobiles began at Willow Run in 1959 with the Chevrolet Corvair; Willow Run also built the rear-wheel-drive General Motors (RWD) Chevrolet Nova (1962–1979), Pontiac Ventura, Pontiac Phoenix, Oldsmobile Omega, Buick Apollo, and Buick Skylark, the front-wheel-drive, the X-cars Oldsmobile Omega, and Buick Skylark (1980–1985), the front-wheel-drive H body Oldsmobile 88 and Pontiac Bonneville, and the B-body Chevrolet Caprice sedan and wagon, Oldsmobile Custom Cruiser wagon, and the Buick Roadmaster Estate wagon. The Chevrolet Corvair was assembled at Willow Run during the car's entire 10-year production run. On May 14, 1969, the media was invited to Willow Run as the last Corvair came down the line; a departure from GM's policy of not permitting reporters to visit their manufacturing facilities.

In 1968, General Motors began reorganizing its body and assembly operations into the GM Assembly Division (GMAD). GMAD required 16 years to completely absorb Fisher Body's operations, and Fisher would manufacture bodies at Willow Run until the 1970s. Assembly operations at Willow Run ended in July 1993 after reduced demand for the full-size B-bodies. Operations were transferred to the Arlington Assembly Plant in Texas.

What was the main plant at Willow Run Assembly had by 2010 become a giant warehouse, the "Willow Run Business Center", part of which was leased to GM for use as a parts distribution facility.

Willow Run Company Vehicle Operations became part of the abandoned GM properties managed by the RACER Trust in March 2011; in April 2013, RACER sold the Company Vehicle Operations facility to International Turbine Industries, an engine maintenance and repair company headquartered across Tyler Road from the former assembly plant.
