= F&P Manufacturing =

Japanese automotive parts supplier

F&P Manufacturing Inc.
- Type: Private
- Industry: Automotive
- Founded: November 1986 in Ontario, Canada
- Headquarters: Tottenham, Ontario, Canada
- Number of locations: Stratford Ontario, Canada
- Key people: Andrew Kochanek, President
- Products: subframes, trailing arms, Lower Arms and Pedals
- Services: Automotive parts
- Revenue: ▲$350 million USD (2007)
- Number of employees: 1200
- Parent: F-Tech Inc.
- Website: www.fandpmfg.com, www.dynamig.com,

F&P Manufacturing Inc. abbreviated F&P Mfg Inc. is a Japanese automotive parts supplier based in North America. They make components such as subframes, trailing arms, Lower Arm and Pedals for Honda, Toyota and General Motors vehicles. F&P Mfg inc. operates plants in Tottenham, Ontario, Canada and Stratford, Ontario, Canada. Its parent company F-Tech was founded in 1947 and is located in Saitama Prefecture, Japan.
