= General Motors F platform =

Automobile platform by General Motors

The F platform, or F-body, was General Motors' rear-wheel drive pony car automobile platform from 1967 until 2002. It was based partially on the GM X platform, which was used for compact applications instead of the sporting intent of the F-Body. The only two vehicles to have been built using the F-Body platform are the Chevrolet Camaro and the Pontiac Firebird. The fourth character in the Vehicle Identification Number for an F-body car is "F" on model year 1985 and up vehicles. Earlier Camaros and Firebirds had differing VIN codes, but are now commonly referred to as F-bodies.

== First generation (1967–1969) ==
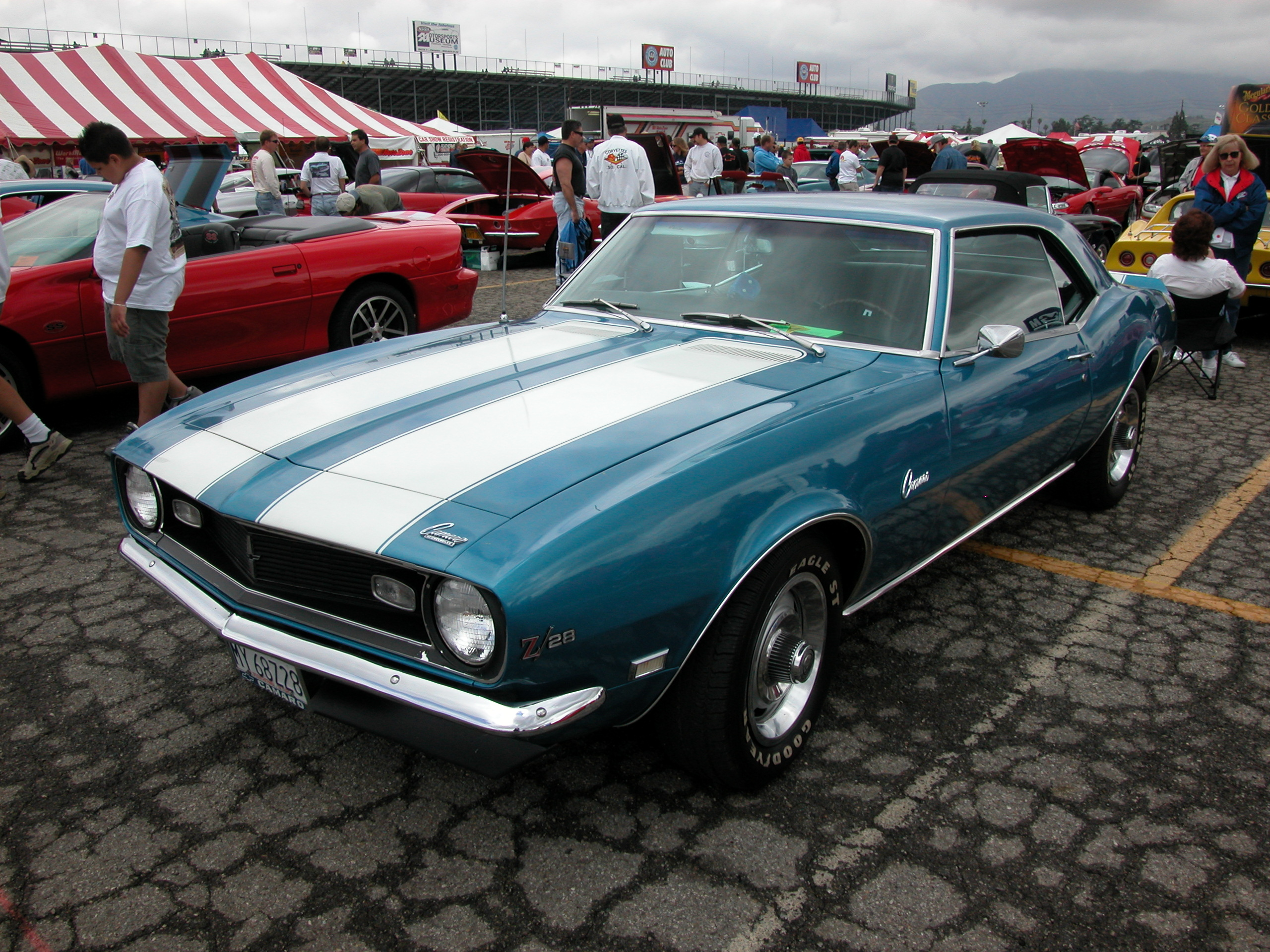
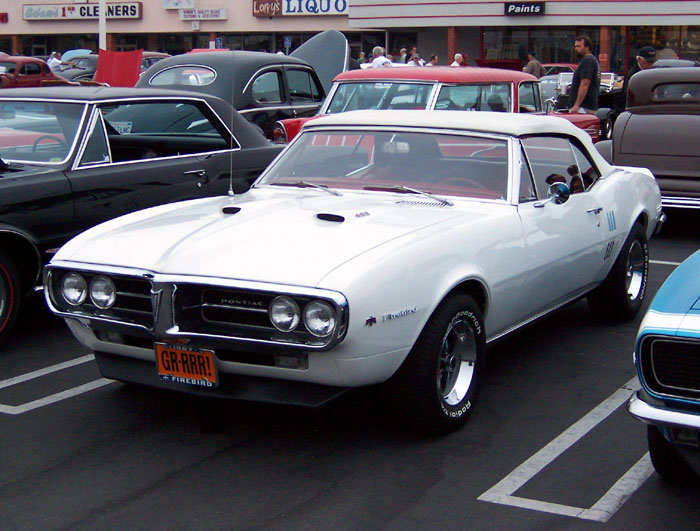
First-gen Chevrolet Camaro and Pontiac Firebird.

The first F-body cars were produced in 1966 for the 1967 model year, as GM's response to the Ford Mustang and later the Mercury Cougar. Originally designed strictly as the platform for the Camaro, Pontiac engineers were given a short amount of time prior to the Camaro's release to produce a version that matched their corporate styling as well. The F-Body was available as both a hardtop coupe and a cloth-top convertible. As was GM policy at the time, Chevrolet and Pontiac both installed their own engines; however, the engine lineups were similar. Both cars could be had with either division's base inline six-cylinder engine, a V8 engine of approximately 5.3 liters (327 cu in for Chevrolet, 326 cu in for Pontiac), or a larger V8 engine of approximately 6.6 liters (396 cu in for Chevrolet, 400 cu in for Pontiac). Due to delays with the design of the second-generation car, the 1969 models were produced longer than usual.

== Second generation (1970–1981) ==
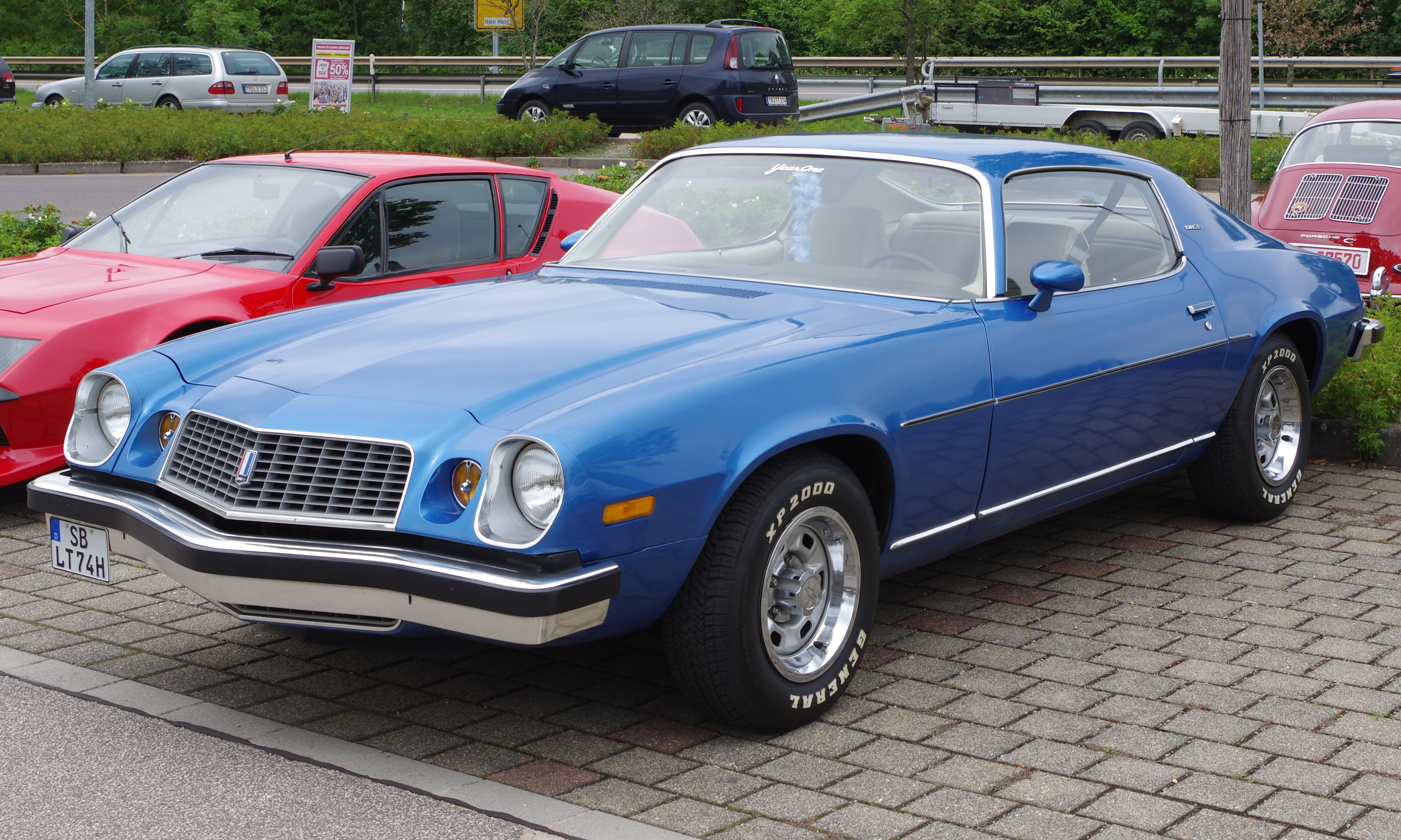
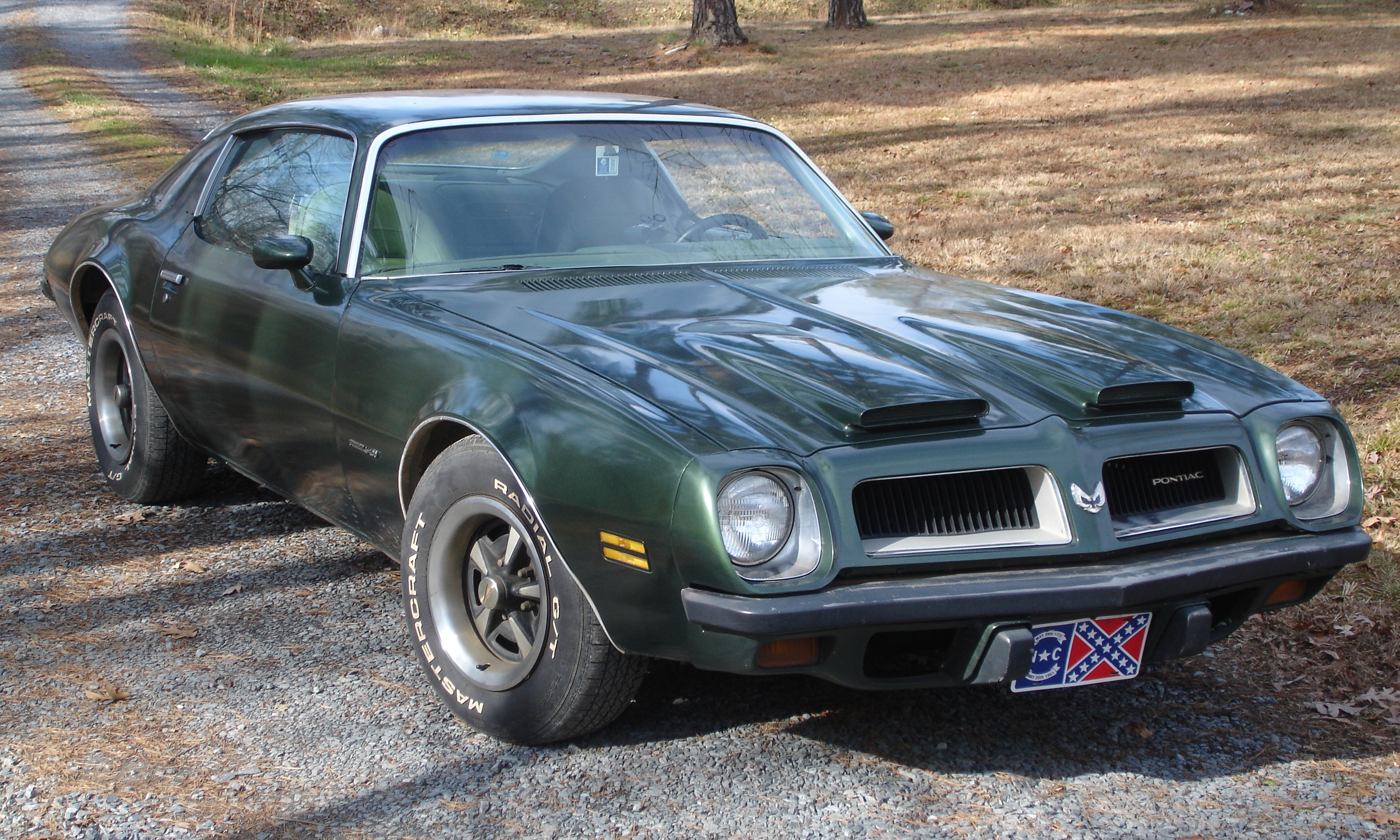
Second-gen Chevrolet Camaro and Pontiac Firebird.

The second generation F-body cars were actually released in February 1970, due to extensive delays in the design and production of the new body style. Both cars grew considerably, with fairly drastic changes in styling to match each brand's updated styling across the lineup. Only Pontiac received engine options in the 7.5 L range in the earlier years of the second generation - (454 cu in for Chevrolet is in technical manuals, but was never produced), 455 cu in for Pontiac. However, this engine option would be discontinued as emissions and fuel-economy restrictions made their production costs prohibitive. Performance continued to decline through 1981, as power levels dropped and weight increased.

== Third generation (1982–1992) ==
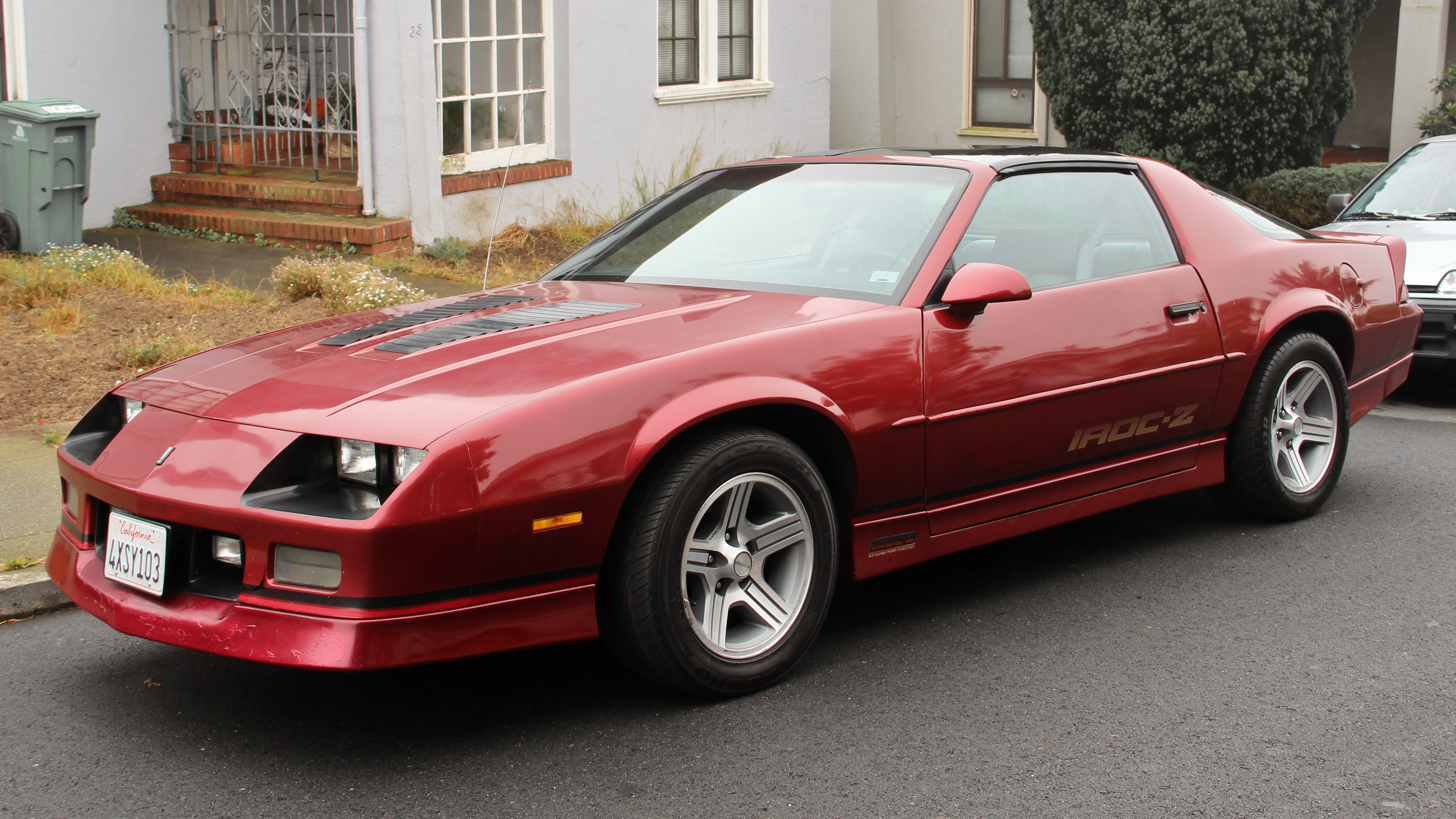
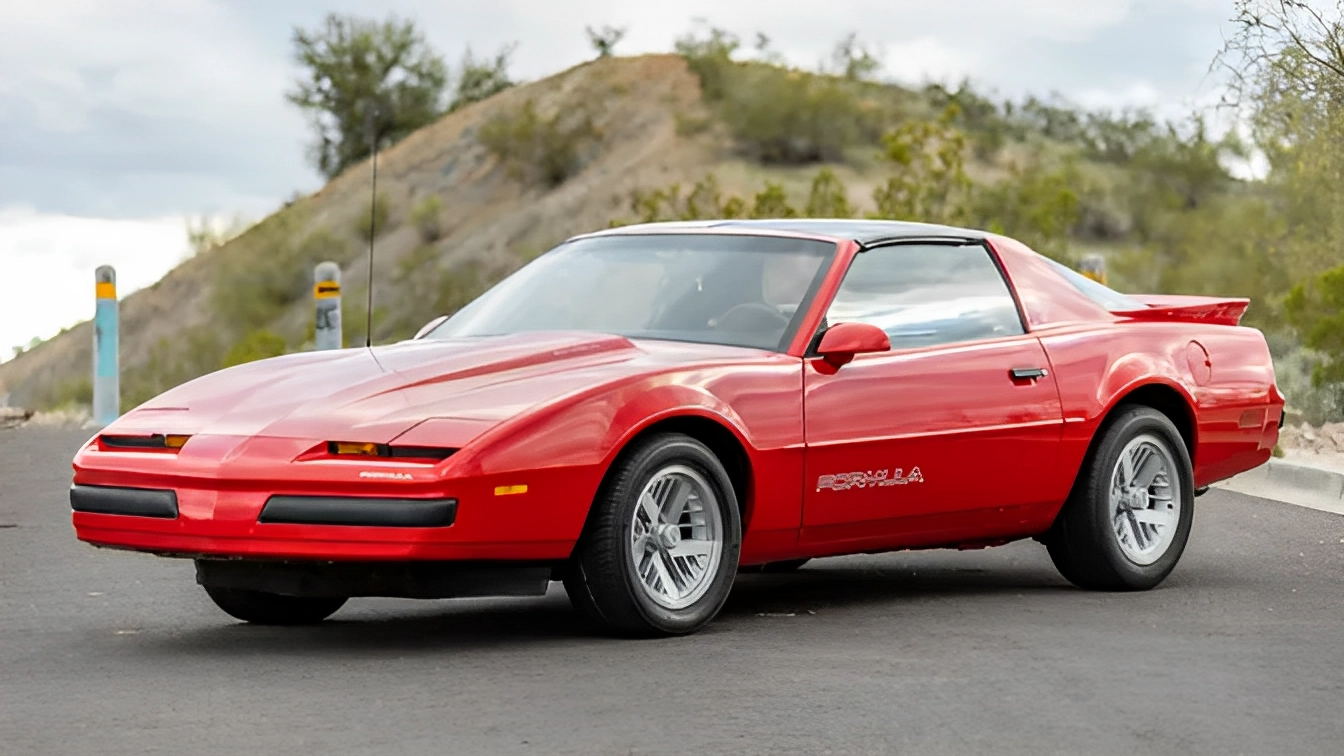
Third-gen Chevrolet Camaro and Pontiac Firebird.

The third generation of the F-Body was introduced for 1982, as a major redesign with a more modern look and a lighter, better-handling car. In a move that would later happen across almost all GM models, the Firebird switched from Pontiac-designed engines to the same Chevrolet engines that powered the Camaro. This was also the first generation of F-Body to be available with a four-cylinder, the Iron Duke. The last Firebird to be built with an engine not available in the Camaro was the 1989 Turbo Trans Am, which had a turbocharged 3.8 L Buick V6, derived from the Buick Regal.

== Fourth generation (1993–2002) ==
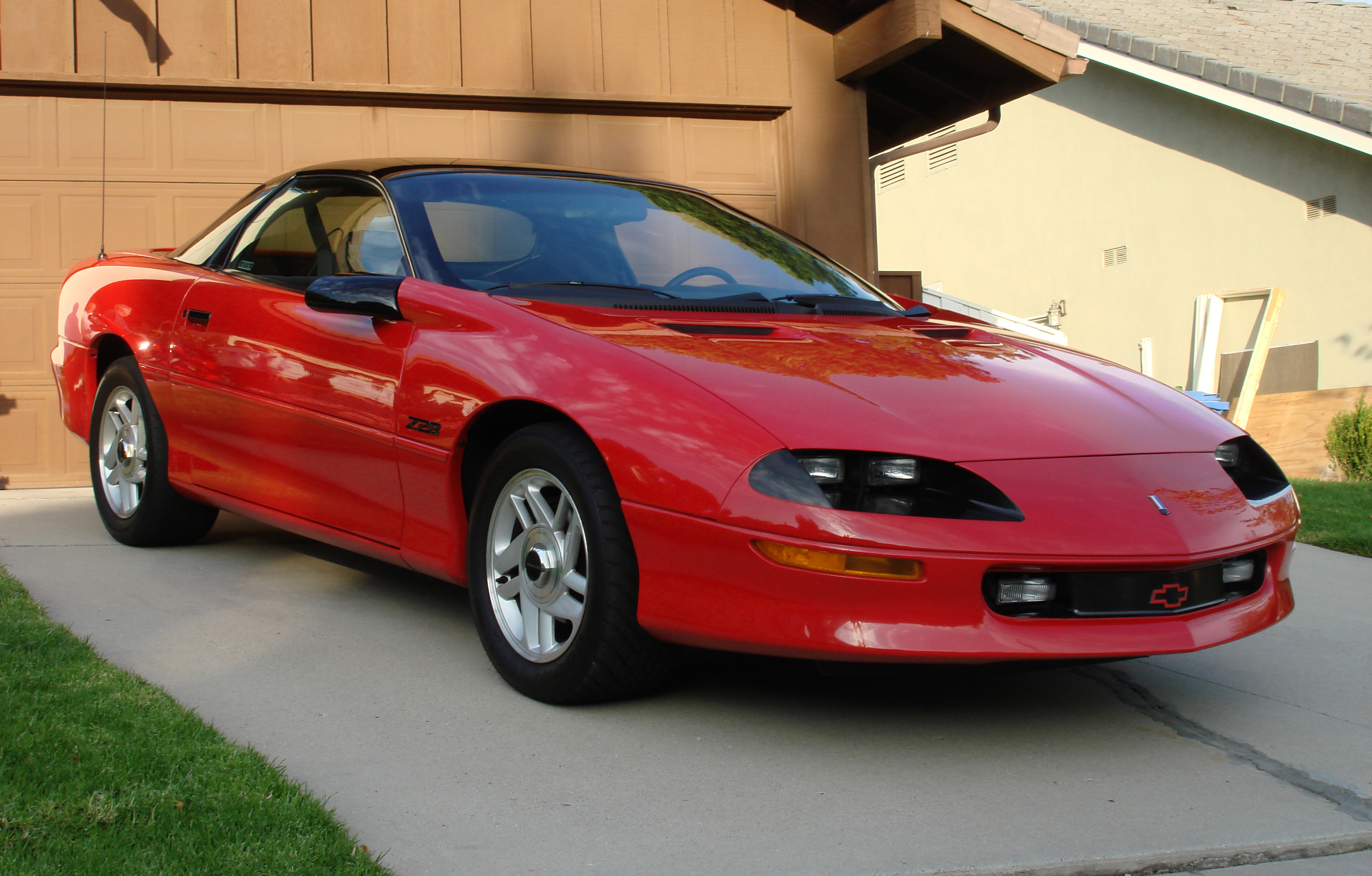
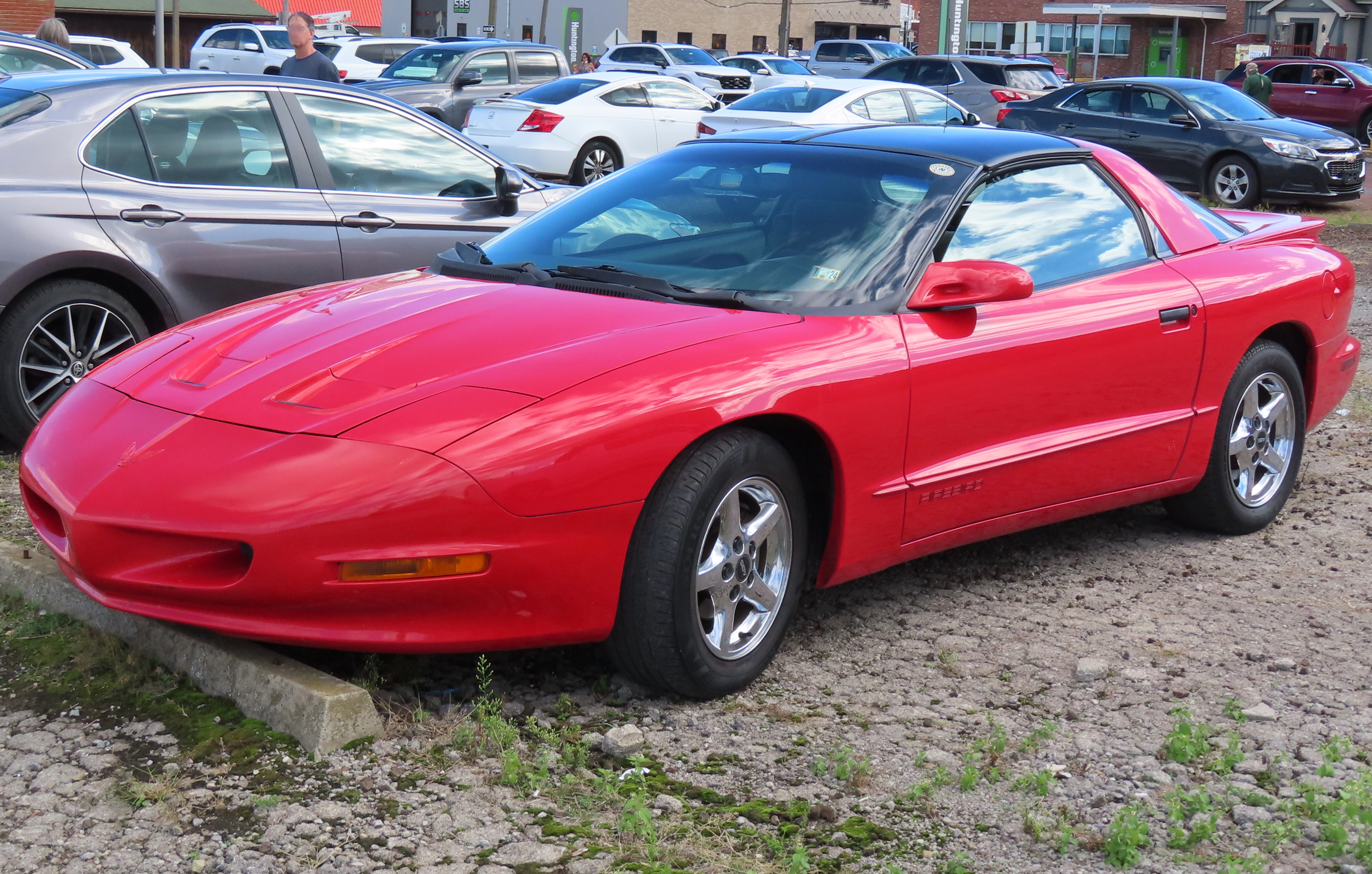
Fourth-gen Chevrolet Camaro and Pontiac Firebird.

The fourth and final generation of the F-platform was released in 1993. It was an extensive revision to the third generation car, instead of a clean-sheet design. It was produced until the platform was canceled at the end of the 2002 model year. Unlike most of the prior years, the engine choices were simplified considerably; each year, on both the Camaro and the Firebird, there was only one V6 and one V8 available. For 1993 to 1995, the V6 was the 3.4 L (208 cu in) 60°; 1996–2002 cars received the 3.8L (231 cu in) 3800 Series II V6. 1993–1997 V8 cars shipped with the 5.7L (350 cu in) LT1, while 1998–2002 cars received the 5.7L (346 cu in) LS1. Both engines were available with the 4L60E four-speed automatic transmission. V6 engines with a manual transmission had a five-speed unit; the manual for V8 cars was the T-56 six-speed, manufactured by either Borg-Warner or Tremec. An optional Hurst-supplied shifter was also available on V8 models.

The fifth-generation Camaro was released in 2010 (after a seven-year layoff) as a 2010 model, using the Zeta chassis, with a VIN code of "F". According to GM, and contrary to rumors of a Firebird companion, no accompanying Pontiac model was planned before the discontinuation of the Pontiac brand in 2009. The sixth generation of the Camaro utilizes the GM Alpha platform shared with the Cadillac ATS and CTS.

== See also ==
- List of General Motors platforms
