= General Motors X platform (RWD) =

GM X platform (RWD)
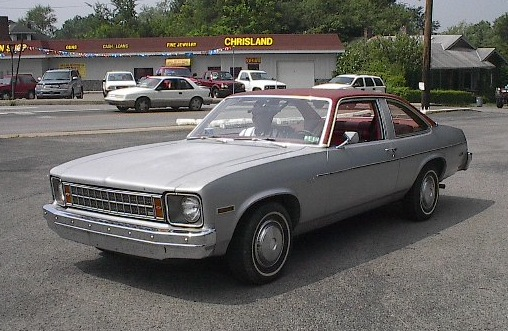
- 1976 Chevrolet Nova

Overview
- Manufacturer: General Motors
- Also called: X-Body
- Production: 1961–1979

Body and chassis
- Class: Compact
- Layout: FR layout
- Body styles: 2-door sedan 2-door hardtop 2-door convertible 3-door hatchback 4-door sedan 4-door station wagon
- Vehicles: Buick Apollo; Buick Skylark; Chevrolet Nova; Oldsmobile Omega; Pontiac Ventura; Pontiac Phoenix
- Related: GM F platform GM K platform GM A platform GM G platform

Dimensions
- Wheelbase: 110 in (2,794 mm) 1962–1967; 111 in (2,819 mm) 1968–1979

Chronology
- Predecessor: GM Y platform (Buick, Oldsmobile, Pontiac); GM Z platform (Chevrolet, indirect)
- Successor: GM X platform (FWD)

The General Motors X platform (also called X-body) is a rear-wheel drive compact car automobile platform produced from the 1962 to 1979 model years. Developed by Chevrolet, the architecture was initially unique in the U.S. to the Chevy II, first joined by the Pontiac Ventura in 1971, then a range of other GM products as its divisions expanded their compact model lines.

For 1980, the platform was discontinued and the X-body designation was reused for its downsized front-wheel drive successor, the first FWD compact car architecture produced by General Motors.

== Overview ==
The X-platform is a rear-wheel drive architecture that was introduced by Chevrolet for 1962 as a more conventional alternative to both the Y-platform compacts of Buick, Pontiac, and Oldsmobile, and the Z-platform Chevrolet Corvair, with Chevrolet debuting the architecture for 1962 with the Chevy II compact sedan.

Using a semi-unibody configuration, the X-platform body was a unitized body from the firewall rearward with frame rails bolted on to support the powertrain and front suspension. Initially introduced with 4 and 6-cylinder engines, the X-body was fitted with a wide variety of powerplants through its production, ranging between a 2.5L I4 and a 6.6L V8.

From 1962 to 1967, the X-body used a 110-inch wheelbase (1/2-inch longer than the Ford Falcon); for 1968, the platform wheelbase was extended to 111 inches (an inch shorter than the A-body).

Sharing largely unchanged chassis underpinnings throughout its 17 model-year production, the X-body underwent body redesign for 1966, 1968, and 1975. The architecture was produced across an extensive range of body styles, including a 2-door sedan, hardtop, and convertible, a 3-door hatchback (among the largest ever produced by GM), and a 4-door sedan and station wagon. The hardtop, convertible, and station wagon are exclusive to the Chevy II before 1968, with the Nova and its counterparts offered as a two-door sedan, three-door hatchback, and four-door sedan.

=== Variants ===
The rear-wheel drive X-body and its semi-unibody design would serve as a basis for two GM platforms through its production. The first two generations of the GM F platform (Chevrolet Camaro/Pontiac Firebird) shared a number of chassis components. Along with the F-platform, the rear-wheel drive GM K platform (Cadillac Seville) shared its steering linkage and front suspension with the X-body; the F-body was shortened to a 108-inch wheelbase while the K-body was lengthened to a 114.3-inch wheelbase.

The X-body would use two steering linkage designs. From 1968 to 1974, the steering linkage was placed behind the steering gear ("rear steer"—also shared with the 1967–1969 F-body). From 1975 to 1979, the steering linkage was moved forward of the steering gear ("front steer"—shared with the 1970–1981 F-body and 1973–1977 A-body; the control arms and steering knuckle were also common to the 1977–1996 B-body)

== Vehicles ==
Exclusive to Chevrolet during the 1960s, the Chevy II (renamed the Chevrolet Nova for 1968) would serve as the successor to the Corvair in the compact segment. In Canada, the model line was also sold as the Acadian (by Pontiac/Buick dealers in place of the Pontiac Tempest) from 1962 to 1971. After exiting the compact segment following the 1963 model year, Pontiac introduced an X-body model line for 1971, with Buick and Oldsmobile following suit for 1973.

Following the introduction of the Oldsmobile Omega, Pontiac Ventura, and Buick Apollo alongside the Chevrolet Nova, the X-body was also colloquially referred to as the "NOVA" chassis, in reference to the first letter of each model name (Nova, Omega, Ventura, Apollo).

As the 1970s progressed, Buick and Pontiac would rename its X-body model lines (shifting nameplates from the A-body intermediates). For 1974, Pontiac downsized the GTO to the X-body (for its final model year before 2004). For 1975, Buick reintroduced the Skylark to replace the two-door and hatchback Apollo, replacing the Apollo entirely for 1976. For 1977, the Pontiac Phoenix was introduced, replacing the Ventura for 1978.

=== Model list (1962-1979 X-body) ===
Acadian (Canada)

- Acadian (1962-1971)
  - Acadian Invader (1962-1971)
  - Acadian Beaumont (1962-1963; replaced by stand-alone Beaumont brand based on Chevrolet Chevelle)
  - Acadian Canso (1964-1971; equivalent to Nova)

Buick

- Buick Apollo (1973–1974; 1975 sedan only)
- Buick Skylark (1975 coupe only; 1976–1979)

Chevrolet

- Chevrolet Chevy II (1962–1968)
- Chevrolet Nova (1968–1979; Chevy II trim level from 1962-1967)
- Chevrolet Concours (1976-1977)

Oldsmobile

- Oldsmobile Omega (1973–1979)

Pontiac

- Pontiac Ventura (1971–1977)
  - Pontiac Ventura II (1971-1972)
- Pontiac GTO (1974)
- Pontiac Phoenix (1977–1979)

== See also ==
- List of General Motors platforms
- General Motors X platform
