= General Motors X platform =

General Motors has used the X-platform or X-body designation for two different automobile platforms. All X-bodies were compact car models.

- 1962–1979 General Motors X platform (RWD)
- 1980–1985 General Motors X platform (FWD)
