= Pontiac Ventura =

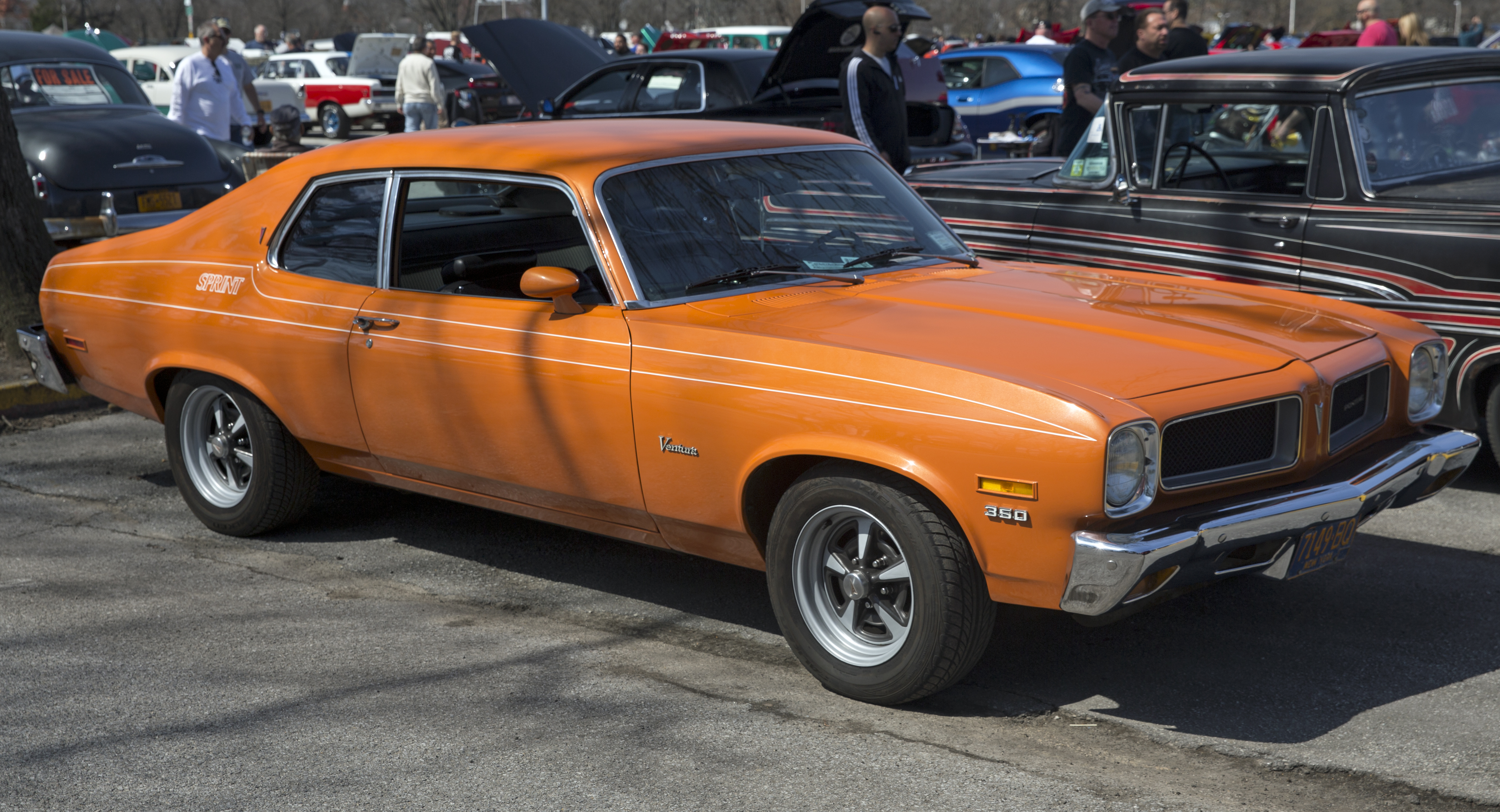
- 1973 Pontiac Ventura Sprint

Overview
- Manufacturer: Pontiac (General Motors)
- Production: 1960–1977

Body and chassis
- Class: Full-size (1960–1970); Compact (1971–1977)
- Layout: FR layout

The Pontiac Ventura is an automobile model which was produced by Pontiac between 1960 and 1977.

The Ventura started out as a higher content trim package on the Pontiac Catalina, and served as the inspiration for the luxury content Pontiac Grand Prix in 1962, then remained as a trim package on the Catalina until 1970. Its name was derived from Ventura, California, joining other similarly derived contemporary models such as the fellow Pontiac Catalina, the Chevrolet Malibu, and the rival Mercury Monterey.

The Ventura nameplate was also used on Pontiac's version of the Chevrolet Nova from 1971 to 1977.

== 1960–1970 ==
First generation
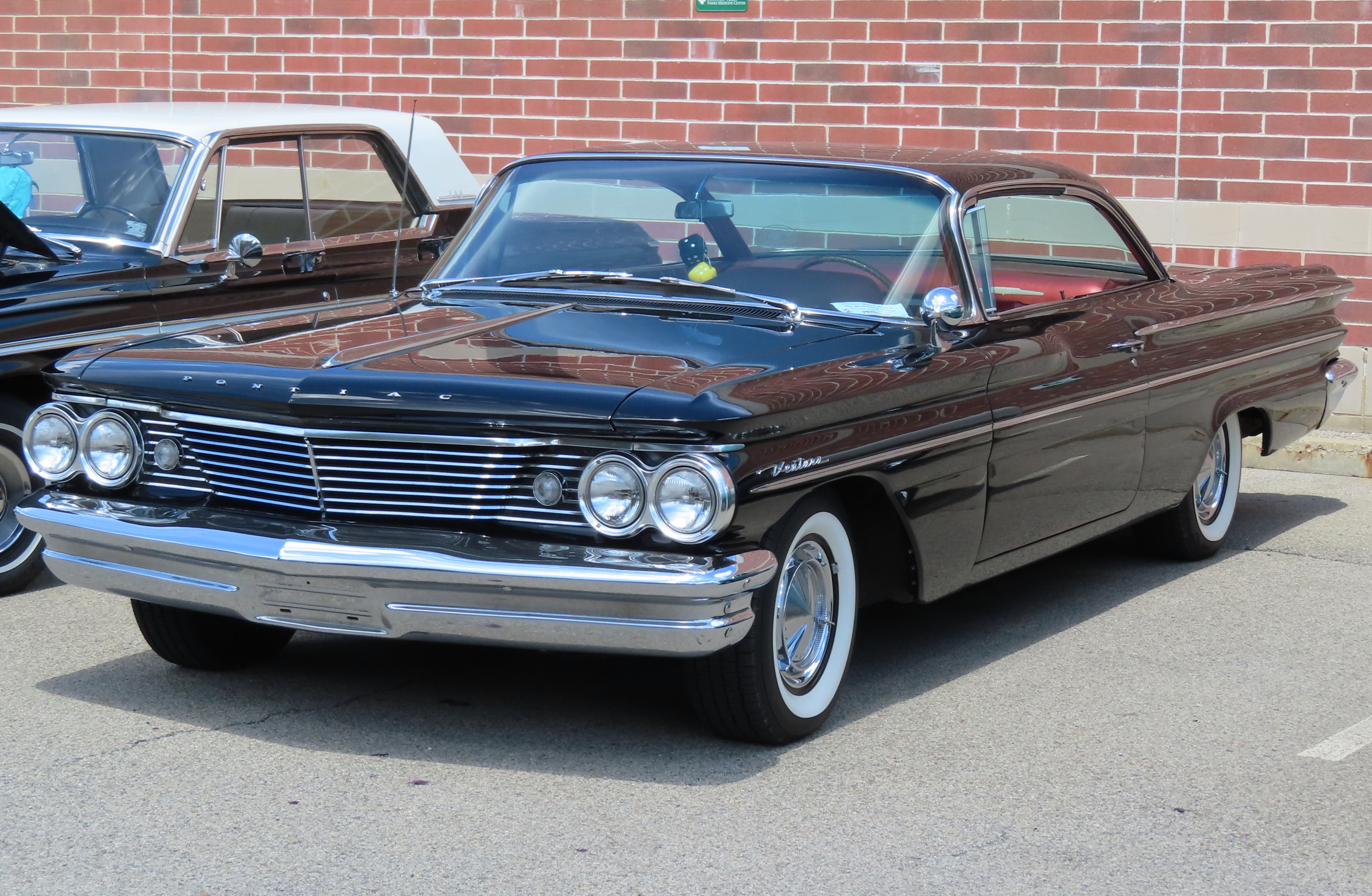
- 1960 Pontiac Ventura Sports Coupe

Overview
- Production: 1960–1970
- Assembly: Pontiac Assembly, Pontiac, Michigan; Arlington Assembly, Arlington, Texas; Doraville Assembly, Doraville, Georgia; Fairfax Assembly, Kansas City, Kansas; Linden Assembly, Linden, New Jersey; South Gate Assembly, South Gate, California; Wilmington Assembly, Wilmington, Delaware

Body and chassis
- Body style: 2-door hardtop coupe 4-door hardtop sedan 2-door convertible
- Platform: B-body
- Related: Chevrolet Impala; Pontiac 2+2; Oldsmobile Holiday 88; Buick Invicta

Powertrain
- Engine: 389 cu in (6.4 L) Pontiac V8; 421 cu in (6.9 L) Pontiac V8
- Transmission: 3-speed manual 3-speed automatic 4-speed manual

Dimensions
- Wheelbase: 123 in (3,124 mm)
- Length: 213.7 in (5,428 mm)
- Width: 78.6 in (1,996 mm)

Chronology
- Successor: Pontiac Grand Prix

The Ventura was first introduced for 1960 as a custom trim package on the Pontiac Catalina's 123-inch B-body wheelbase, and was only available as the Vista four-door hardtop, or the Sports Coupe two-door hardtop. It was offered all standard and optional equipment from the Catalina, and added unique exterior identification, deluxe wheel covers, a sport steering wheel, and distinctive tri-tone "Morrokide" upholstery. It was more expensive than the longer Pontiac Star Chief but was priced below the top-level Pontiac Bonneville.

The sales success was influential to the introduction of the Pontiac Grand Prix in 1962, as a custom trim package coupe using the Catalina platform, while the Star Chief became the entry-level trim package of the Bonneville. The listed retail price for the Sports Coupe was $2,971 ($32,333 in 2025 dollars) before an extensive list of optional equipment, that included several choices of radios, including the "Sportable" battery operated dashboard removable portable unit, electric extendable radio antenna, air conditioning, "E-Z-Eye" tinted glass, bucket seats, "Safeguard" speedometer, "Magi-Cruise" cruise control, windshield washer, under-hood utility light, remote adjustable driver-side side view mirror, power windows, power steering, power brakes, and two choices of heater and windshield defroster selections.

With the introduction of the Grand Prix for 1962, the Ventura continued as a trim option for 1962 through 1970 on Catalina models, wearing a "Ventura" nameplate and could be installed with the Pontiac 421 H.O. V8. In 1964 the Pontiac 2+2 was introduced with very similar equipment to the Ventura while installing bucket seats for both front and rear passengers.

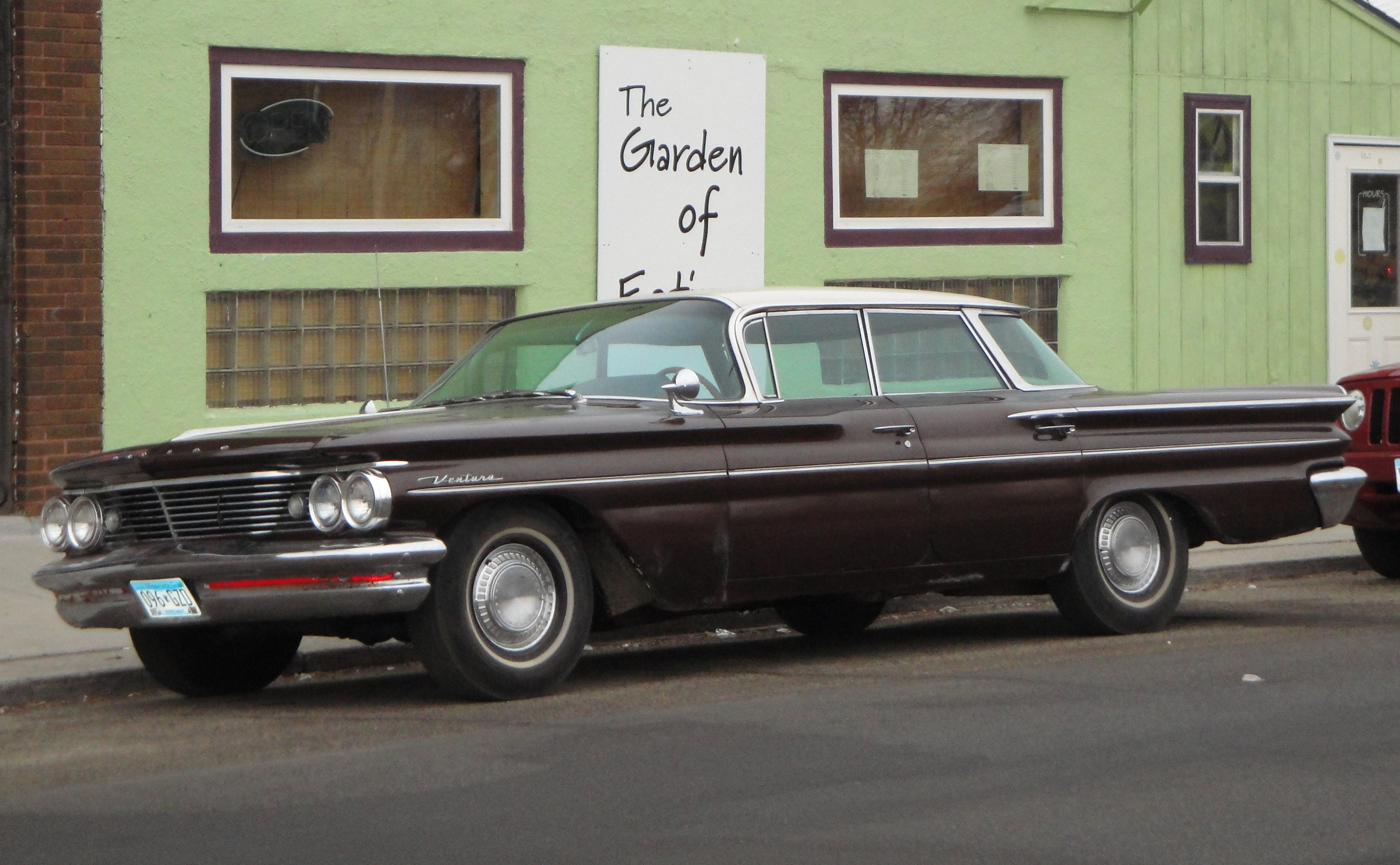
1960 Pontiac Ventura Vista

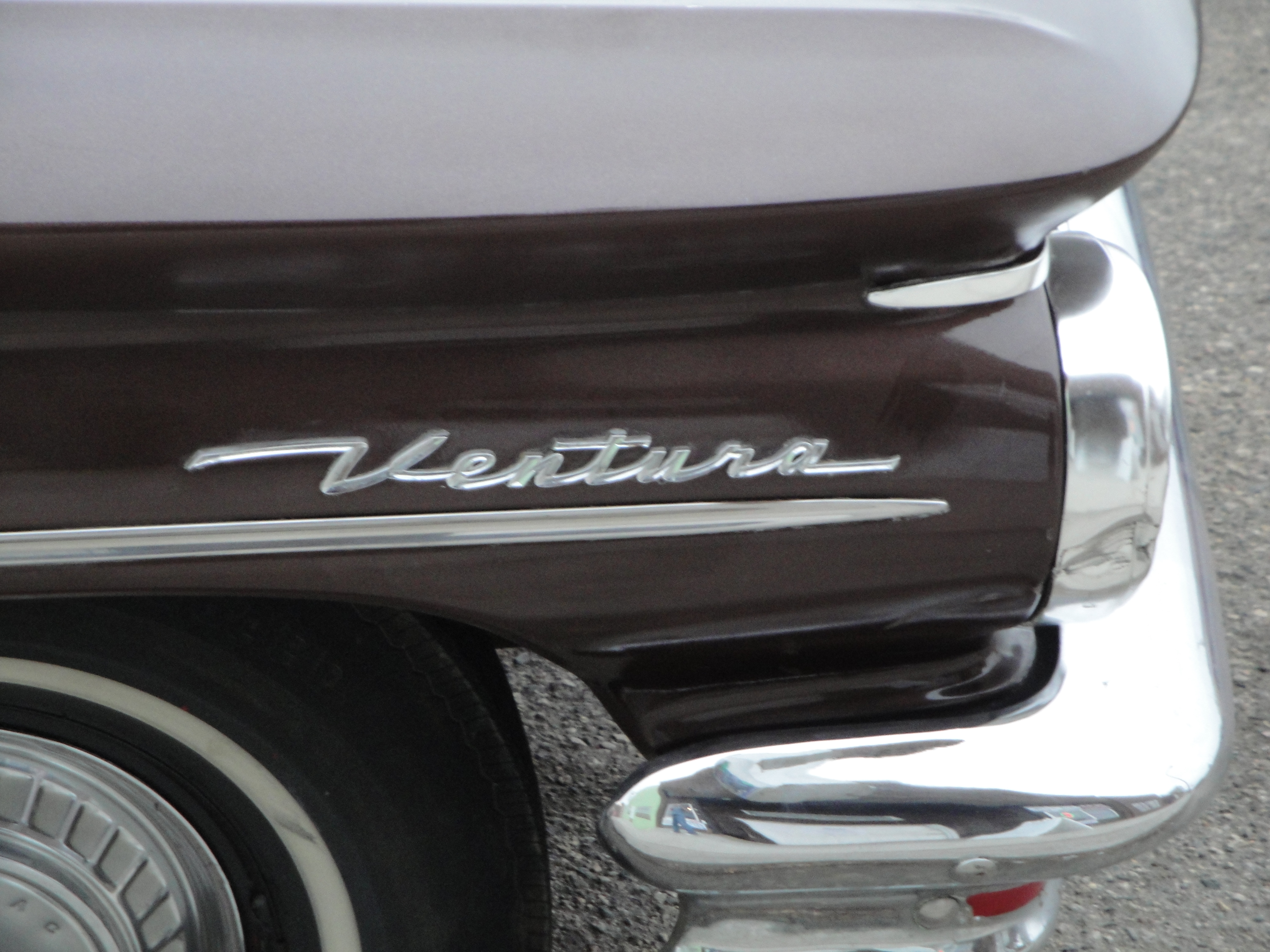
Badge on a 1960 Pontiac Ventura Vista

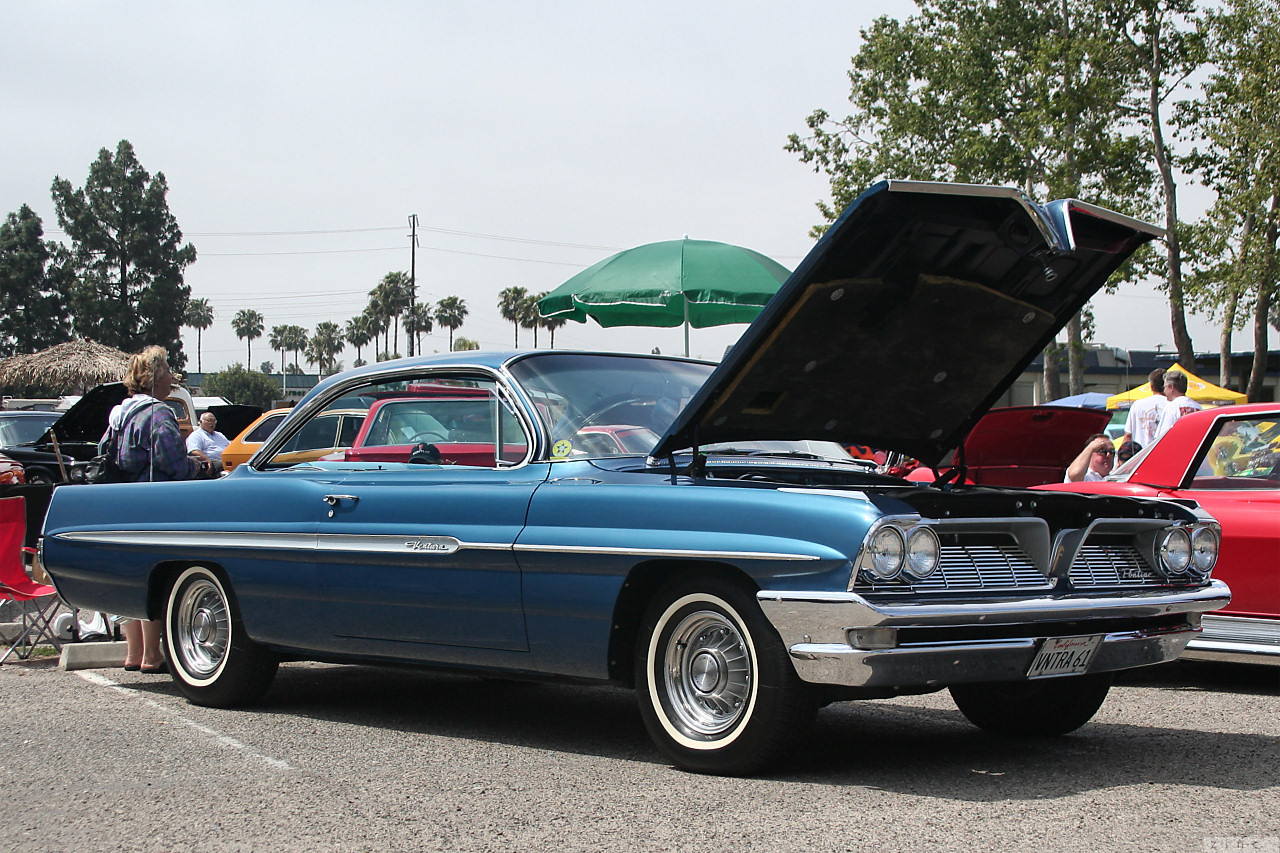
1961 Pontiac Ventura Sports Coupe

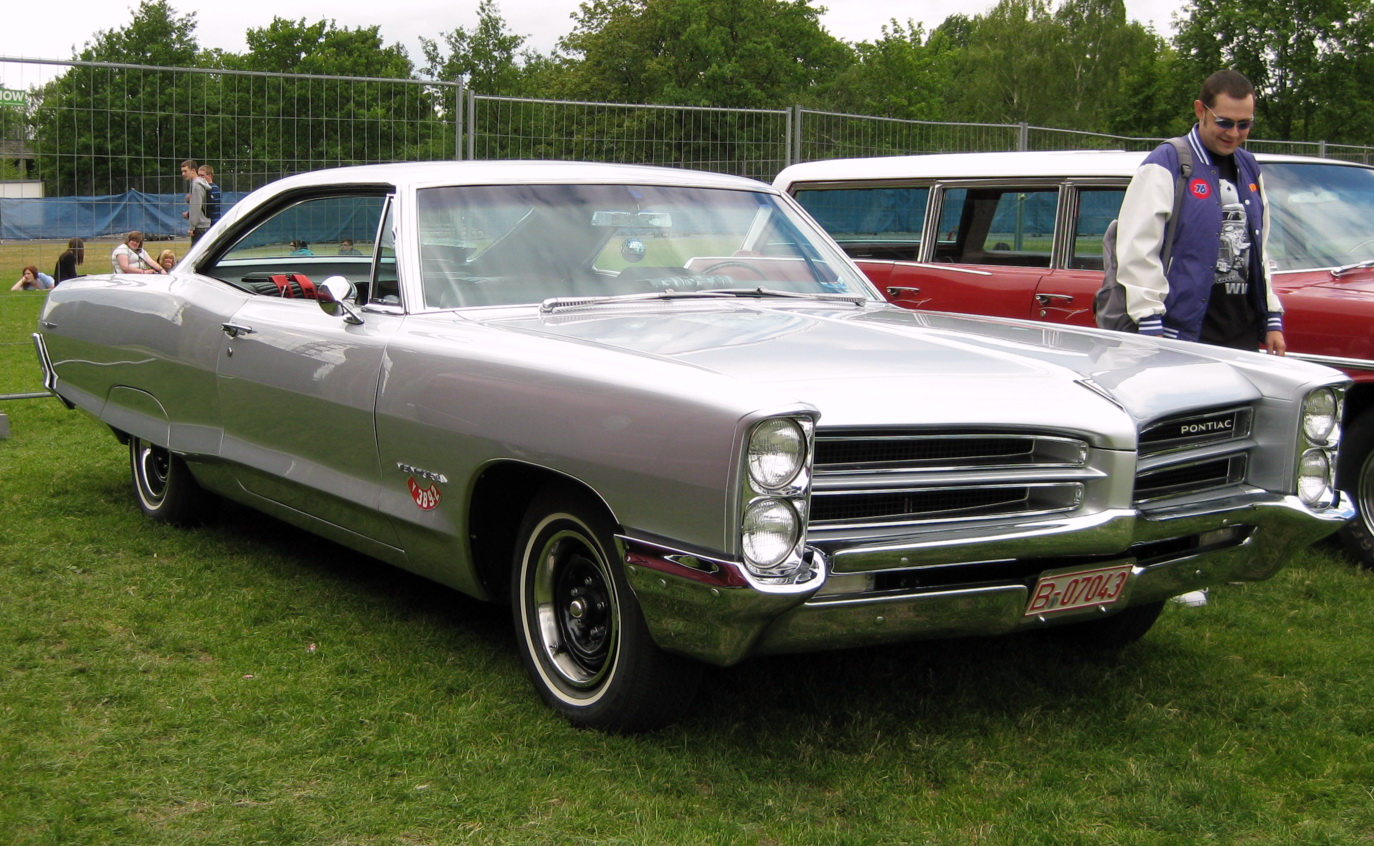
1966 Pontiac Ventura Hardtop Coupe

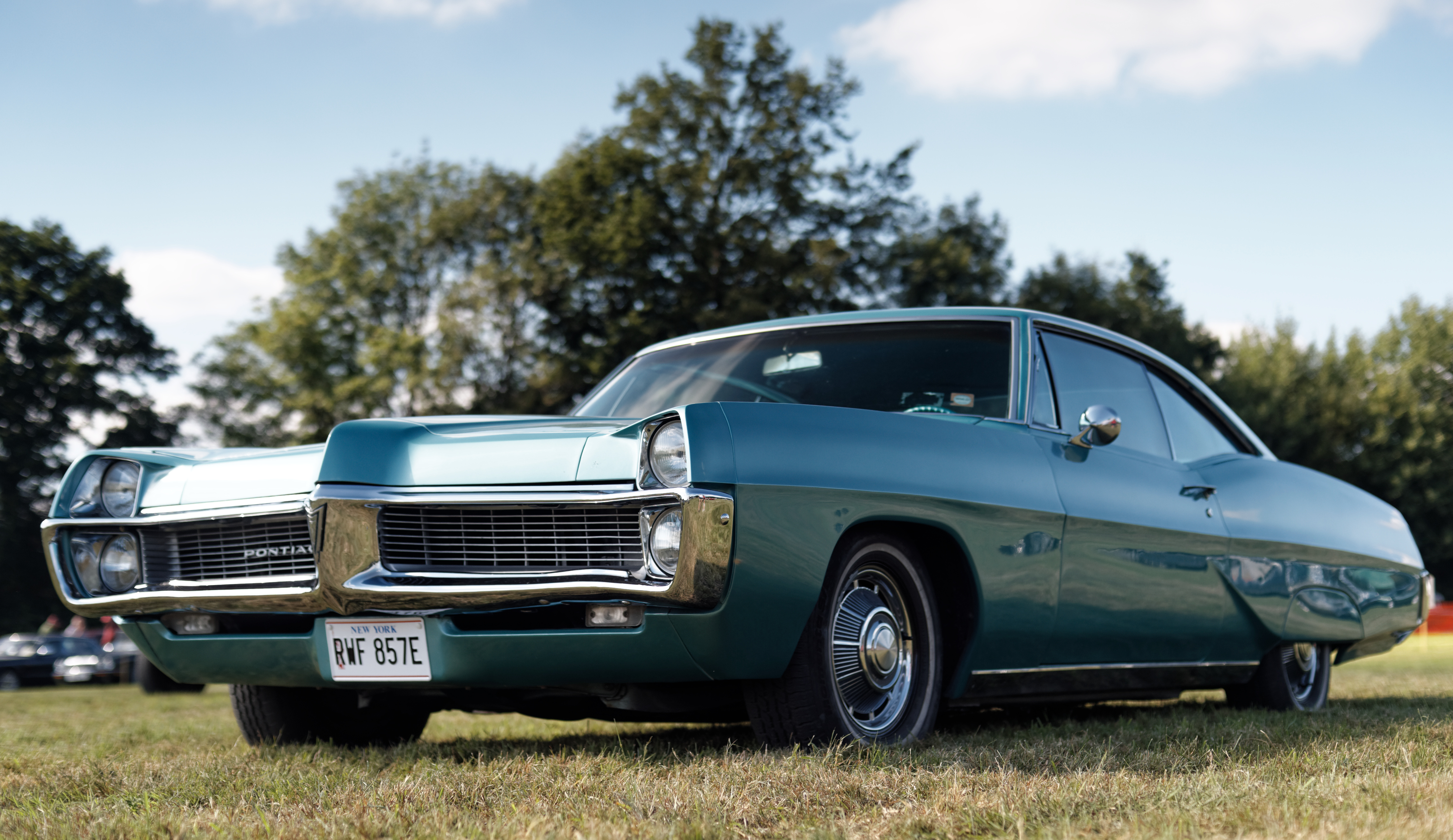
1967 Pontiac Ventura Hardtop Coupe

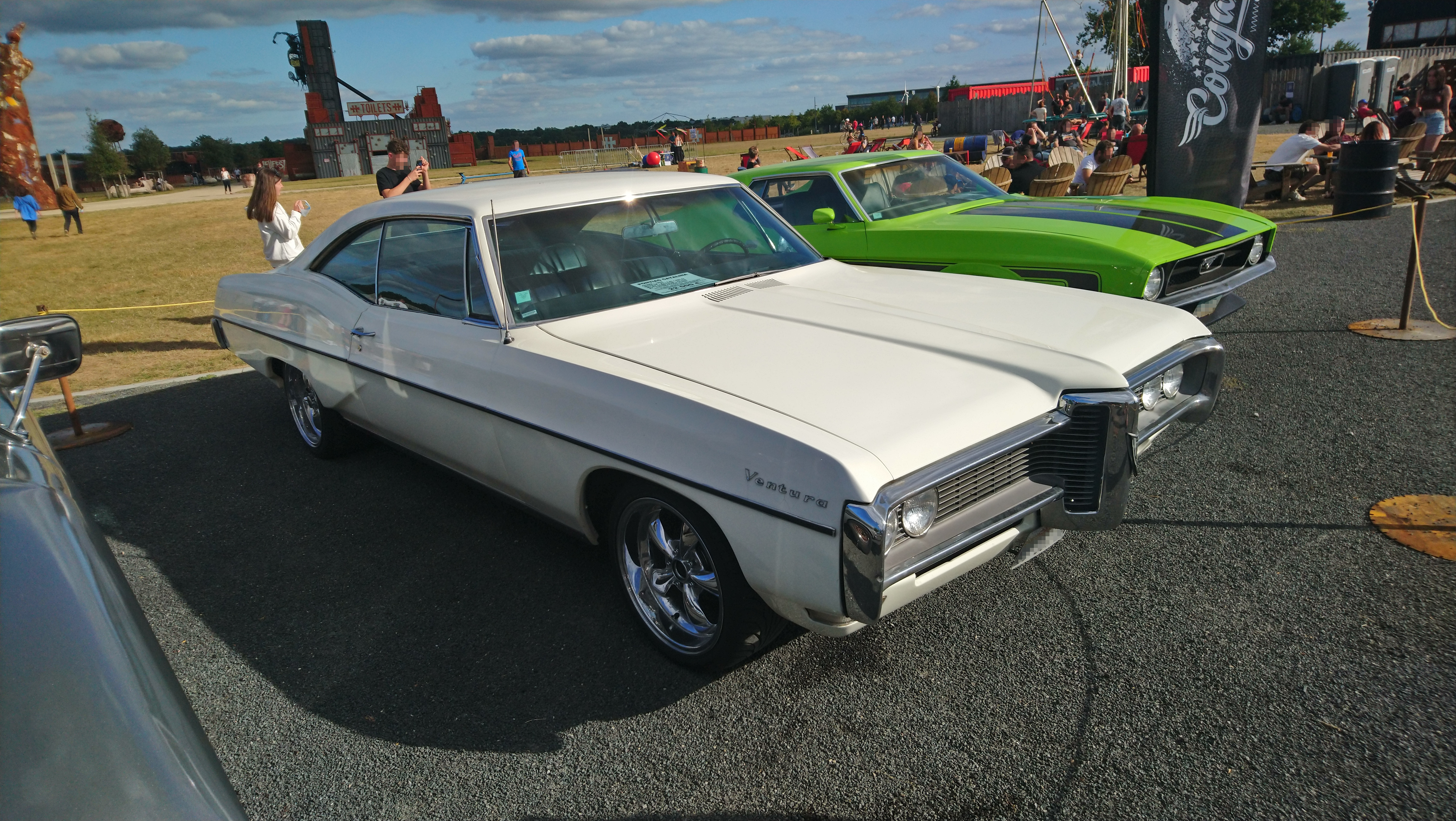
1968 Pontiac Ventura Hardtop Coupe (with non-standard wheels)

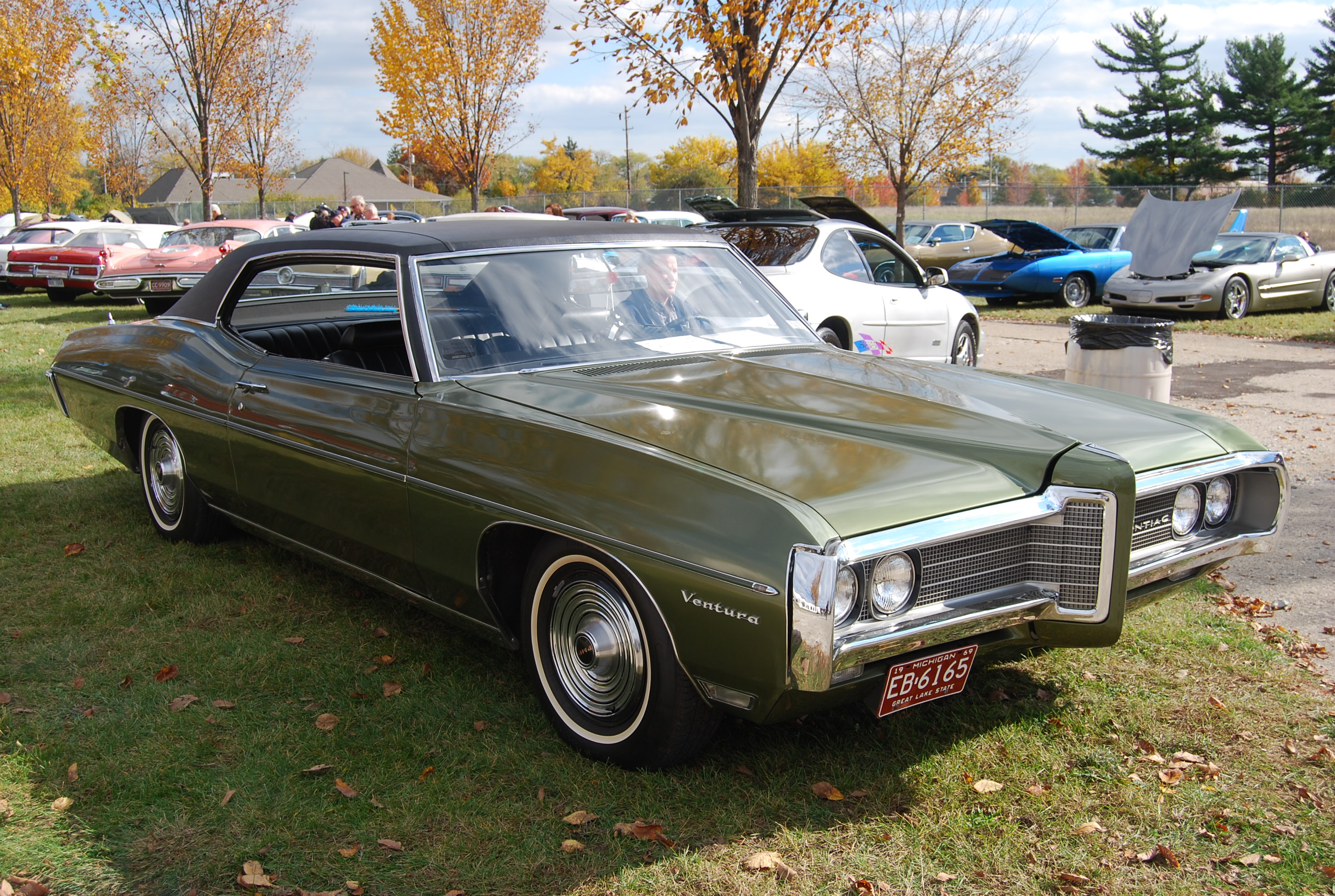
1969 Pontiac Ventura Hardtop Coupe

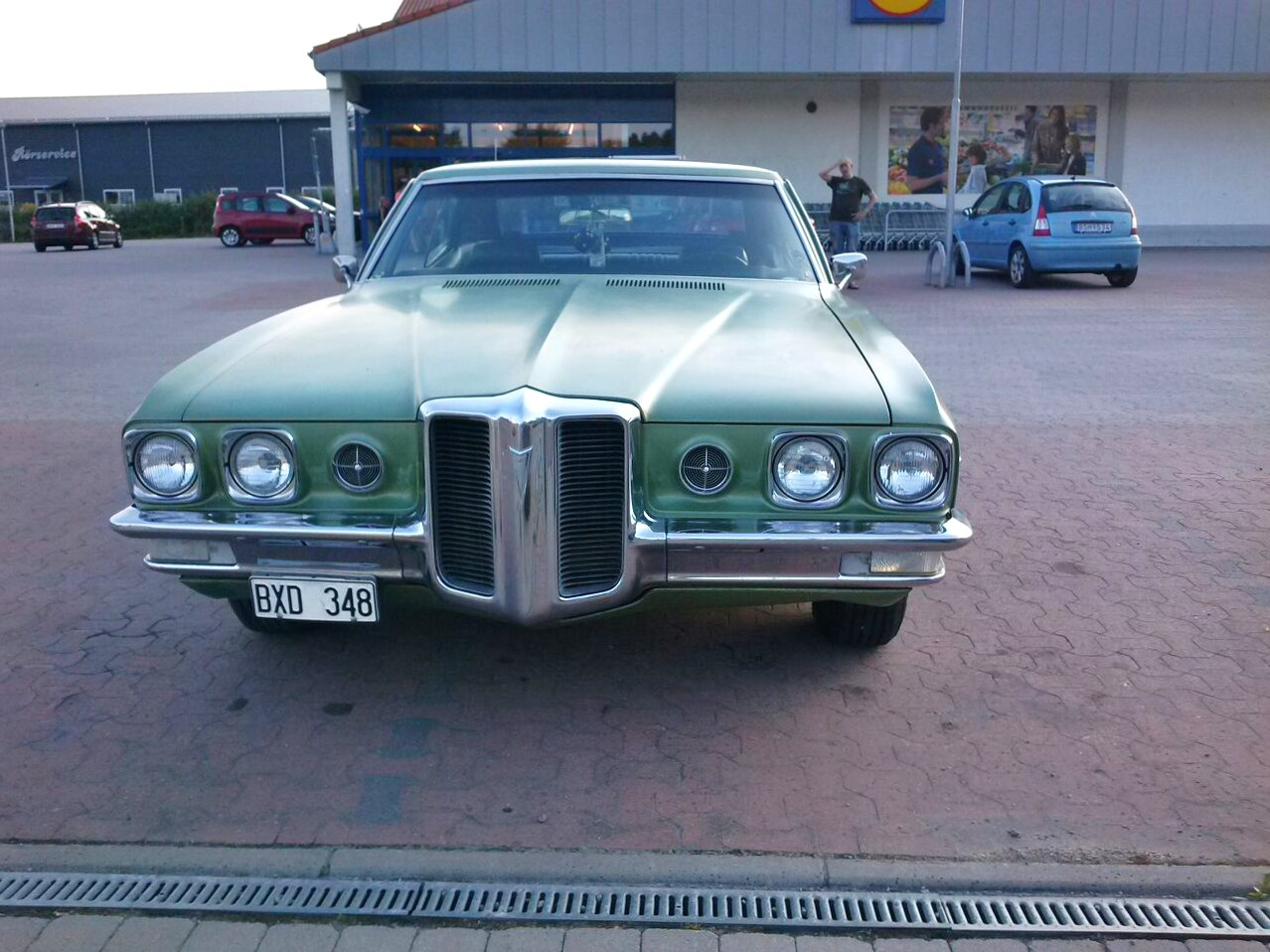
1970 Pontiac Ventura Hardtop Coupe

== 1971–1977 ==
Second generation
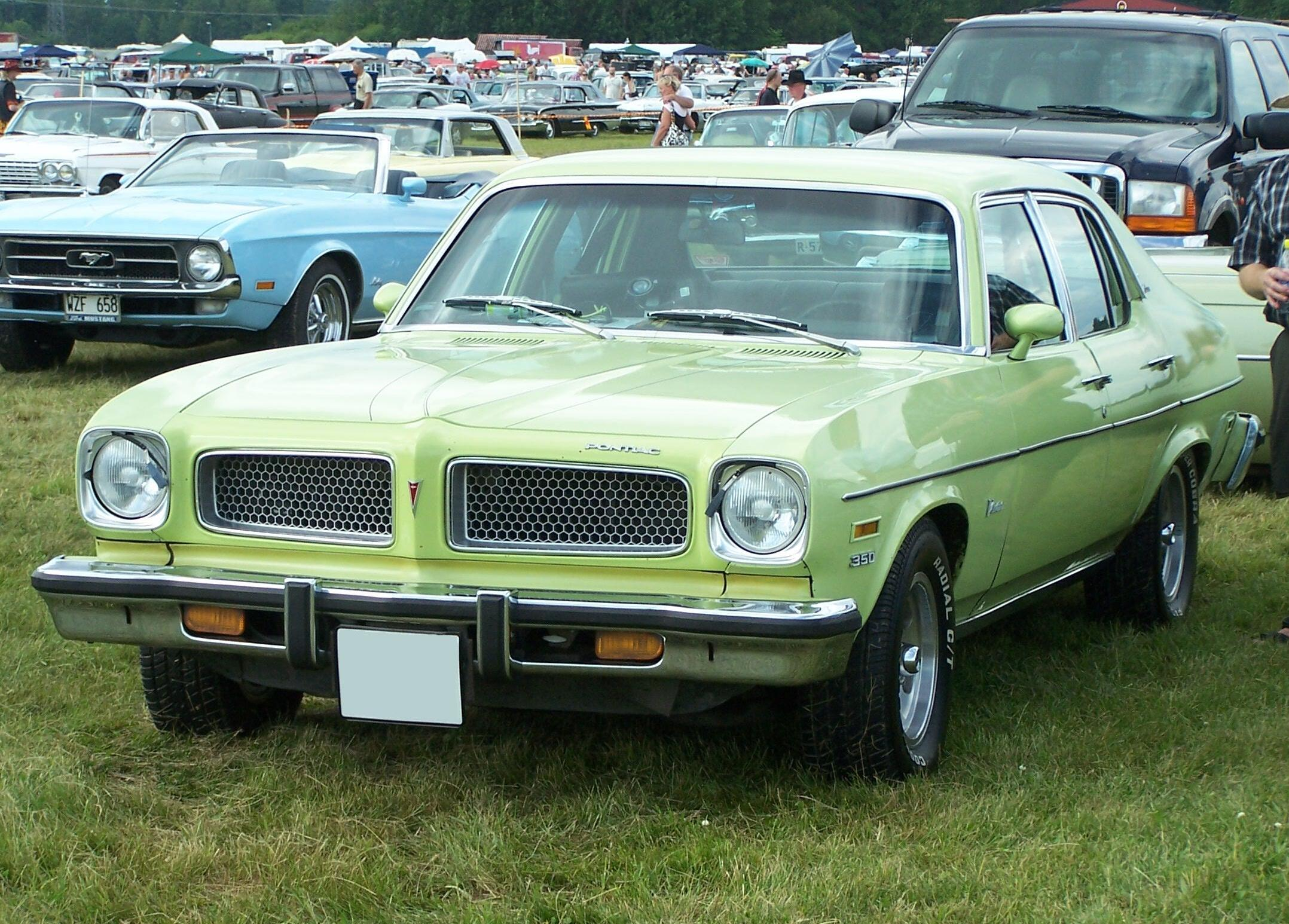
- 1974 Pontiac Ventura 4-Door Sedan

Overview
- Also called: Pontiac Ventura II
- Model years: 1971–1977
- Assembly: Van Nuys Assembly, Van Nuys, California; Willow Run Assembly, Ypsilanti, Michigan; North Tarrytown Assembly, North Tarrytown, New York

Body and chassis
- Body style: 2-door coupe 3-door hatchback 4-door sedan
- Platform: X-body
- Related: Chevrolet Nova; Pontiac Phoenix; Oldsmobile Omega; Buick Apollo

Powertrain
- Engine: 151 cu in (2.5 L) Iron Duke I4; 231 cu in (3.8 L) Buick Fireball V6; 250 cu in (4.1 L) Chevrolet 250 I6; 260 cu in (4.3 L) Oldsmobile LV8 V8; 305 cu in (5.0 L) Chevrolet LG3 V8; 307 cu in (5.0 L) Chevrolet 307 V8; 349 cu in (5.7 L) Buick 350 V8; 350 cu in (5.7 L) Chevrolet 350 V8; 354 cu in (5.8 L) Pontiac 350 V8
- Transmission: 2-speed automatic 3-speed manual 4-speed manual 3-speed automatic

Dimensions
- Wheelbase: 2,814 mm (110.8 in)
- Length: 4,940 mm (194.5 in)
- Width: 1,839 mm (72.4 in)
- Height: 1,334 mm (52.5 in)

Chronology
- Successor: Pontiac Phoenix

In 1971, Pontiac moved the name to their new X-body entry, the Ventura II.

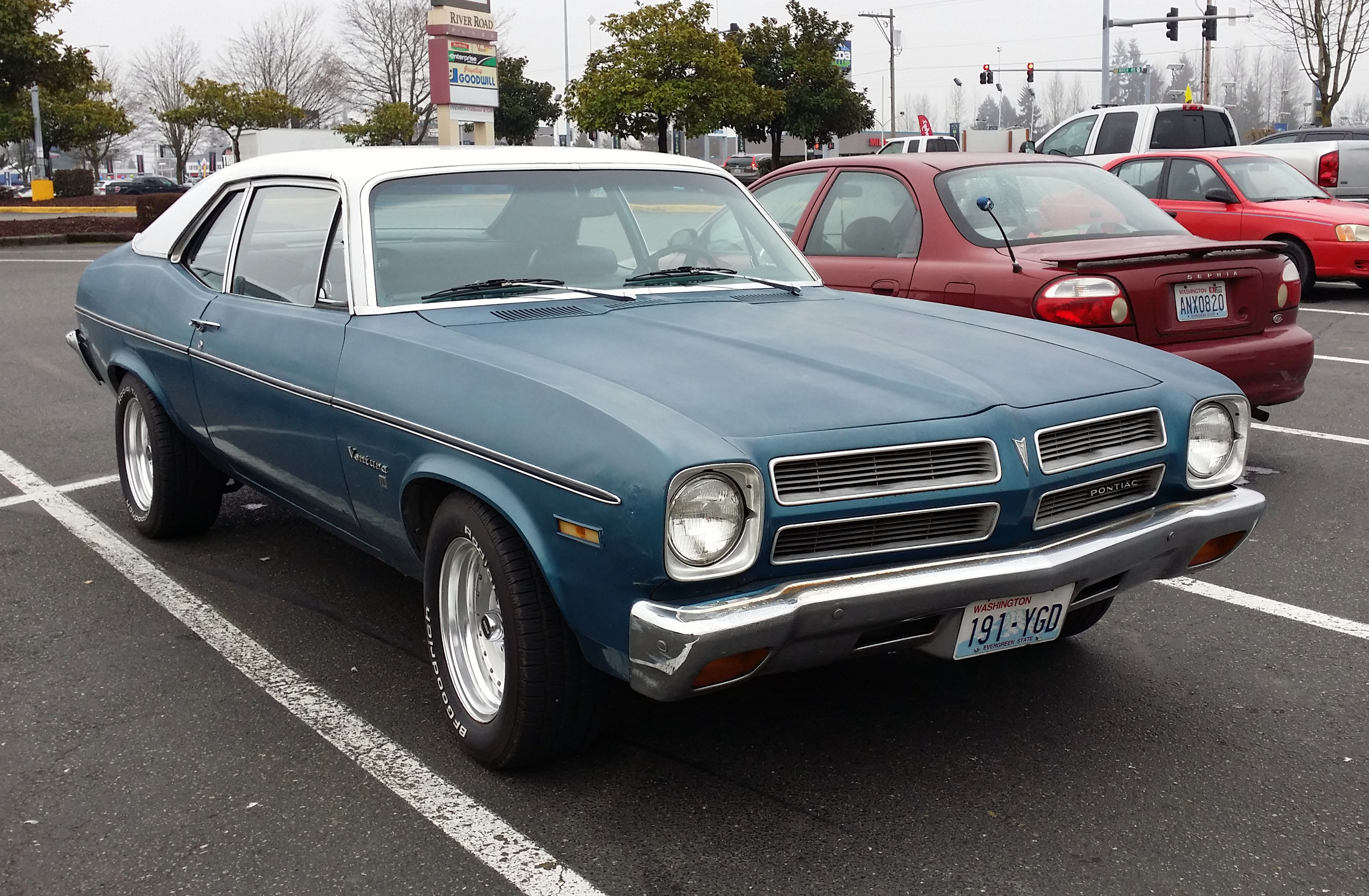
1971 Pontiac Ventura II Coupe

Ventura II production ran from 1971 to 1977. The "II" suffix was dropped after 1972, and the Phoenix name replaced Ventura in 1978. Engine offerings for the abbreviated 1971 model year included a 250 cu in. six cylinder or 307 cu in., only the 307 was available for the Sprint option in '71. For 1972, a Pontiac-built 350 cu in. V8 with two-barrel carburetor was added to the option list and became the base V8 for 1973 and 1974. Transmission offerings consisted of a standard column-shift three-speed manual with options including a four-speed manual, two-speed automatic (with six-cylinder) or three-speed Turbo Hydra-Matic automatic (with V8s). The 1973 six-cylinder Ventura was the last Pontiac model to offer the two-speed automatic, a badge-engineered Chevrolet Powerglide, which was dropped completely from all GM cars and trucks after this model year in favor of the Turbo Hydra-Matic.

A Ventura Sprint option package was offered on two-door models 1971 to 1975, including three-speed transmission with floor shift and optional 350 cu in. V8 equipped four-speed, body color mirrors, custom carpeting, all-vinyl upholstery with either the standard bench or optional Strato bucket seats, Custom Sport steering wheel, blackout-grille trim, special striping, blackout grille, and 14x6" (36 cm diameter, 15 cm wide) wheels.

In mid-1972, Pontiac introduced the limited production Ventura SD for the Southern California market as sort of a sporty-luxury compact to counter imported luxury sedans then taking the U.S. market by storm. The SD option added the high-back Strato bucket seats from the Firebird along with a Custom Sport steering wheel, Rally II wheels, uprated suspension and other items. Some 250 Ventura SD's were built for 1972, all at the GM Nova/Ventura assembly plant in Van Nuys, California plant.

In 1973, higher spec cars received a new split grille in the Firebird/GTO style. Lower grade cars retained the split level grille used in 1971 and 1972. The Ventura Custom became a separate series (2Z, versus 2Y for the regular Ventura), carrying a "Custom" script on the rear roof pillar. In addition to the two-door coupe and four-door sedan, a three-door hatchback coupe was added to the lineup.

In 1974, the Pontiac GTO name moved to the Ventura from the intermediate LeMans line. The GTO package gave the basic Ventura a 350 cu in (5.7 L) engine with a four-barrel carburetor of about 200 hp (150 kW). The package also came with a functional "shaker" hood scoop, tri-color GTO decals, Rally II wheels, and special grille-mounted driving lights. The GTO package could be ordered on the hatchback Ventura as well as the base and Custom coupes.

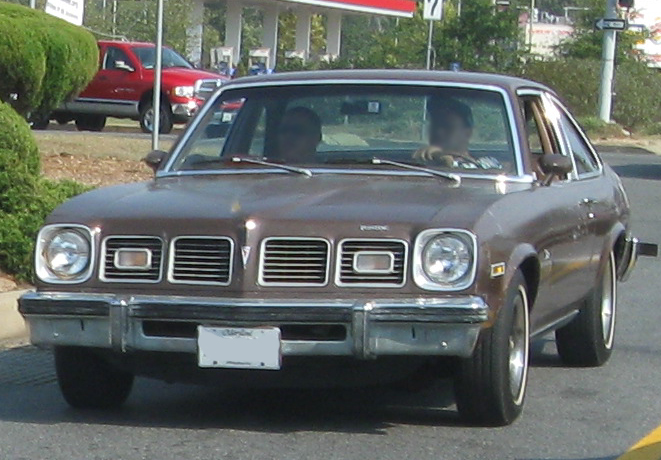
1975 Pontiac Ventura

The GTO was dropped in 1975, along with the Pontiac 350. The Ventura could be optioned with the Buick 350 V8 instead.

The Ventura SJ was a new offering for 1975, when the Ventura and other GM compacts were restyled with new rooflines along with improved suspensions shared with the second generation F platform (Camaro/Firebird), plus standard front disc brakes. The Ventura SJ was marketed as an American rendition of a Euro-style luxury sport sedan that Pontiac created with the larger mid-sized Grand Prix in 1973, as well as a competitor to the new-for-1975 Ford Granada and Mercury Monarch, both marketed as luxury compacts designed to compete with the more expensive imports such as Audi and Mercedes. As such the Ventura SJ included an upgraded interior with reclining bucket seats in either cloth or vinyl along with a center console, rally instrumentation and other items and borrowed the trim package "SJ" from the Grand Prix.

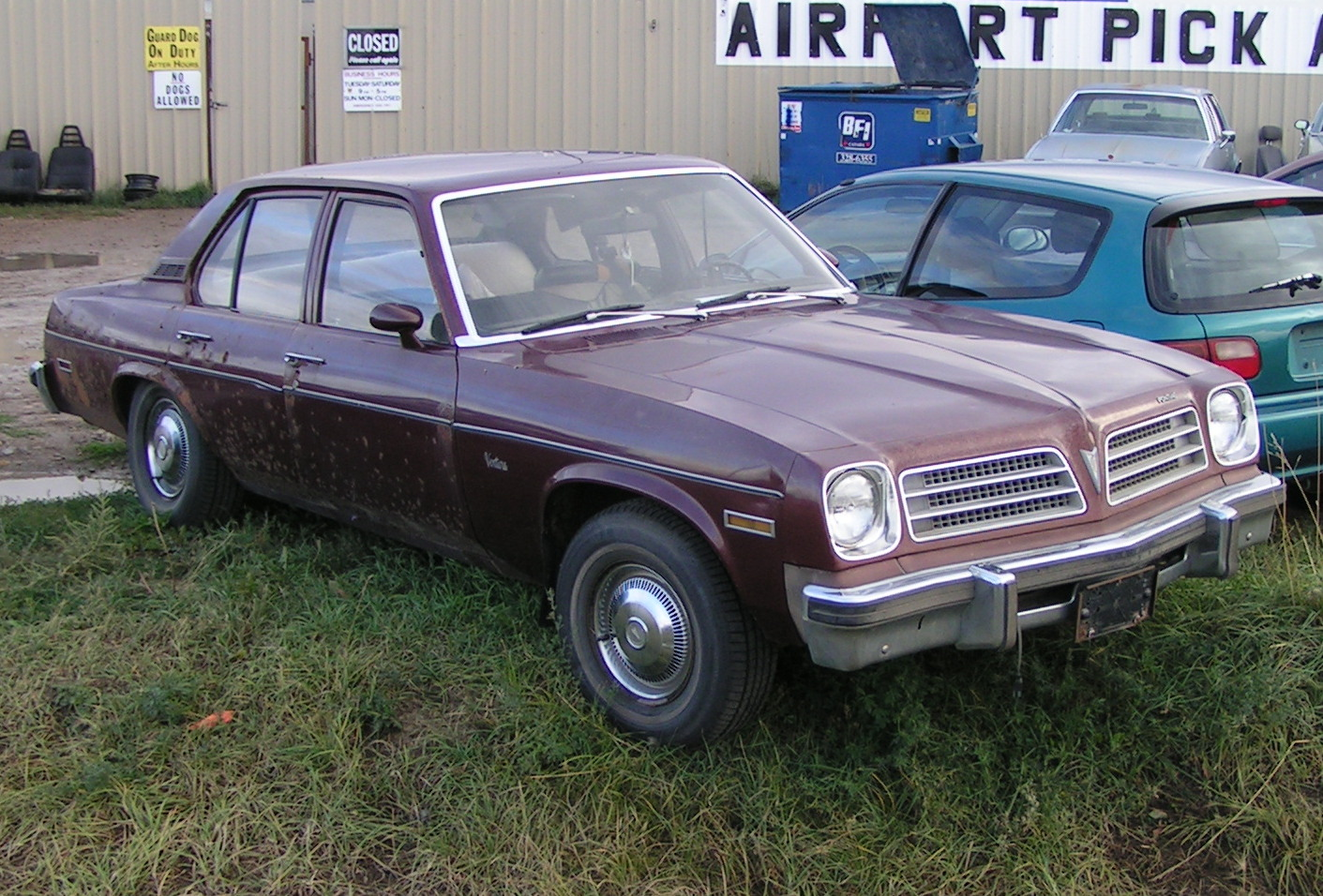
1976 Pontiac Ventura 4-Door Sedan

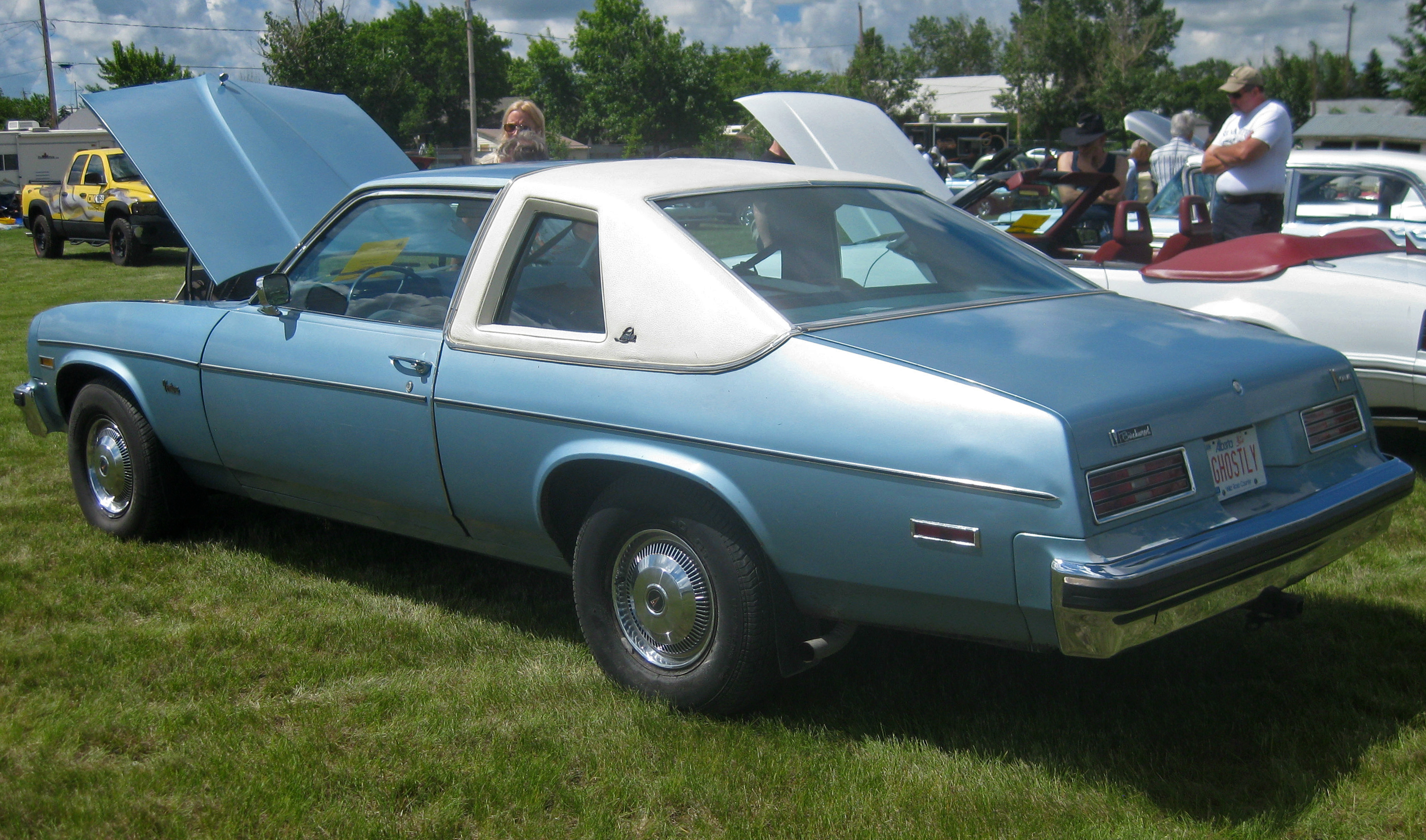
1976 Pontiac Ventura Coupe

Only minor appearance changes were made to the Ventura for 1976 and 1977 including new grilles and revised taillights. 1976 saw the inclusion of the Oldsmobile 260 cubic inch V8. For 1977, the Chevy 250 six was replaced by Buick's 231 cu in V6 as the base powerplant and the Chevrolet 305 cubic-inch V8 was introduced as an option. The availability of the 2.5 liter "Iron Duke" 4-cylinder was optional along with the 301 cu in V8. One unique feature for 1976 was the availability of a 5-speed manual transmission (Borg Warner T-50) with the 260 cubic inch V8; it was the standard transmission with the Iron Duke. Under 700 units total with this combination were built in 1976.

At the beginning of the 1977 model year, the Ventura SJ was the top-line model but at mid-year was replaced by the Phoenix, which featured a distinctive center grille and rectangular headlights and the most luxurious interior available in a Pontiac X-body car. Otherwise, the Phoenix was basically a plushed up Ventura much like the Chevrolet Concours was related to the more mundane Nova.

For 1978, the Ventura nameplate was retired and all X-body cars were sold under the Phoenix nameplate through that year and into 1979 with a top-line Phoenix SJ designated as the top-line series.
