= Pontiac Can Am =

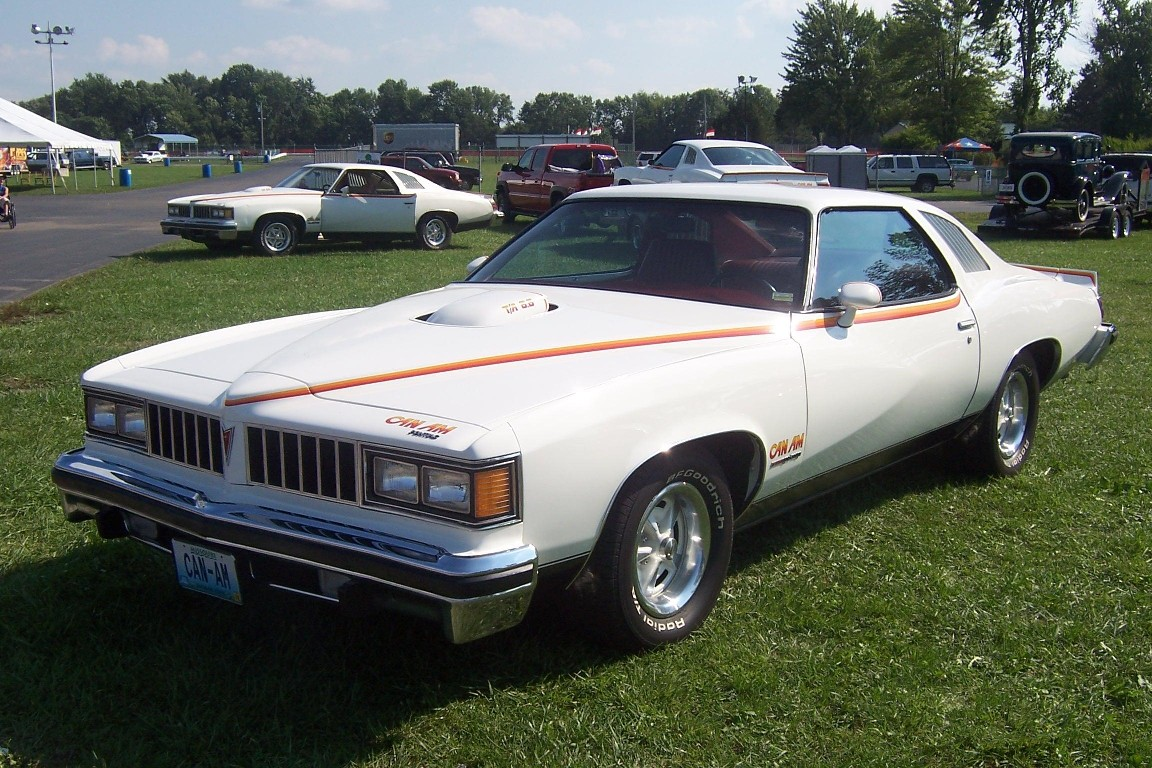
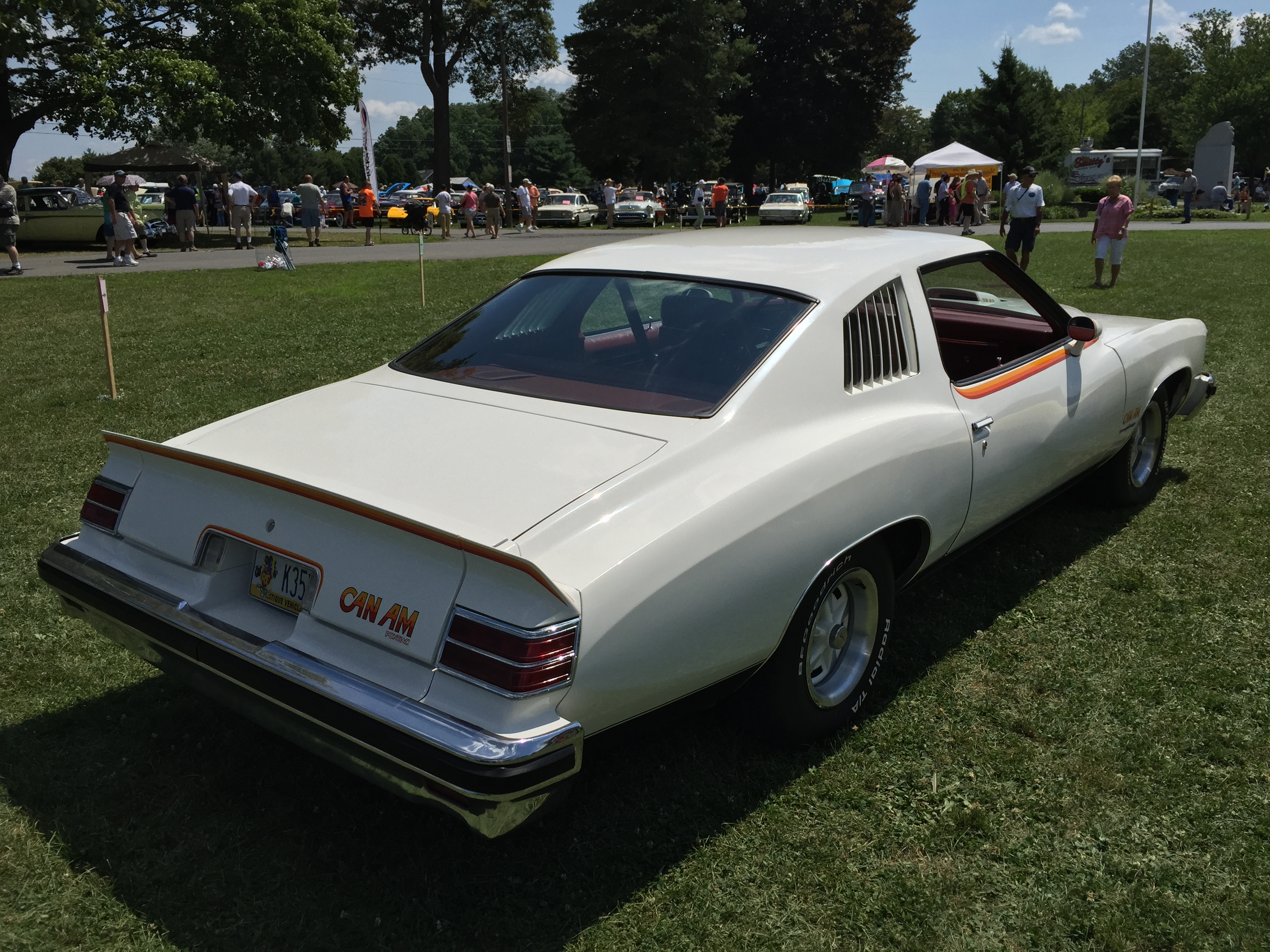
1977 Pontiac Can Am

The Pontiac Can Am is a midsize muscle car built by Pontiac and based on the Pontiac LeMans and the Pontiac Grand Am. The Can Am was a special edition option package and was only available in 1977. It was named for the Can Am racing series, continuing the race theme used for the Pontiac Grand Prix, LeMans and Trans Am.

== Description ==
Series 2A

Overview
- Production: 1977
- Model years: 1977
- Assembly: Pontiac, Michigan, United States

Body and chassis
- Class: Mid-size
- Layout: FR layout
- Platform: GM A platform (RWD) (A-body)

Powertrain
- Engine: 400 cu in (6.6 L) Pontiac V8 engine 403 cu in (6.6 L) Oldsmobile V8 (California only)
- Transmission: TH400 3-speed automatic

Dimensions
- Wheelbase: 112.0 in (2,845 mm)
- Length: 208.6 in (5,298 mm)
- Width: 77.7 in (1,974 mm)

It was introduced midway through the production year, at the North American International Auto Show at the Detroit Auto Show during January 1977 - along with the Pontiac Sunbird Sport Hatch model. One feature of the Can Am was the Trans Am's shaker hood scoop as standard equipment, and succeeded the slow selling 1973-1975 Pontiac Grand Am.

The car was a trim package of the Pontiac Le Mans, but powered by the Pontiac 400 rated at 200 hp (149 kW; 203 PS) (the T/A 6.6 "W72" version, not the base 400, which made 180). Cars specifically destined for Californian or high-altitude county dealers, featured the Oldsmobile 403 Small Block making 185 hp (138 kW; 188 PS).

The Can Am package was on Le Mans cars painted Cameo White which were then accessorized in orange, red, and yellow graphics, as well as blacked-out lower panels and window trim. The standard road wheel was a color-matched Rally II with chrome trim rings. Many options were available, including the aluminum "snowflake" wheels offered on the Trans Am, and a steel or glass sunroof. Interior trim color options were the same as the base Le Mans, and included red, black, white, and tan.

The number of Can Ams produced has never been accurately determined, but the number most commonly used is 1,377. Complete Le Mans coupes were shipped by Pontiac to Jim Wangers' Motortown which carried out the various Can Am appearance modifications, including those relating to the hood, rear deck spoiler and body decals. According to the Can Am Registry in late 2007, 42 cars feature the Oldsmobile 403 engine, outwardly identified by "6.6 LITRE" decals on the hood shaker. The rest of the cars on the Registry have the Pontiac 400 engine, designated "T/A 6.6" on the hood shaker decals. The Pontiac Historical Service (PHS) can determine whether a car is a genuine Can Am, and list the options as it was delivered from the factory.

When the Can Am was first introduced to the dealers, Pontiac envisioned producing 2,500 units; the response from the buying public was much more than expected and over 5,000 orders were submitted. Unfortunately, the mold used to produce the fiberglass rear spoiler broke, and production at Motortown ended. Pontiac upper management, already worried about losing sales of their Grand Prix models (the Can Am and the Grand Prix used the same dashboard and console, so a sale of a Can Am was seen as a loss of a sale of a Grand Prix by some senior Pontiac executives), decided to scrap the project after approximately one half year of production.

Road tests commonly quoted the Can Am as having a 180 hp (130 kW) Pontiac 400, along with a 2.41 rear gear ratio. This was a combination never offered to the public. When built with the Pontiac 400 engine, the Can Am came with the three-speed automatic TH400 and 3.08 rear gears. When built with the Olds 403 engine for cars sold in California, the Can Am came with the three speed automatic TH350 and 2.41 rear gears. No four-speed manual transmission cars were produced.

Performance tests from 1977 estimated 0-60 mph (97 km/h) time for the Can Am with the Pontiac engine at about 10 seconds, about the same as the previous year's Le Mans with the 455, and a 1/4-mile (0.40 km) time of approximately 17 seconds.

It is estimated that 1133 Can Ams were produced.
