= Shaker scoop =

Small shovel for transferring coal to a furnace

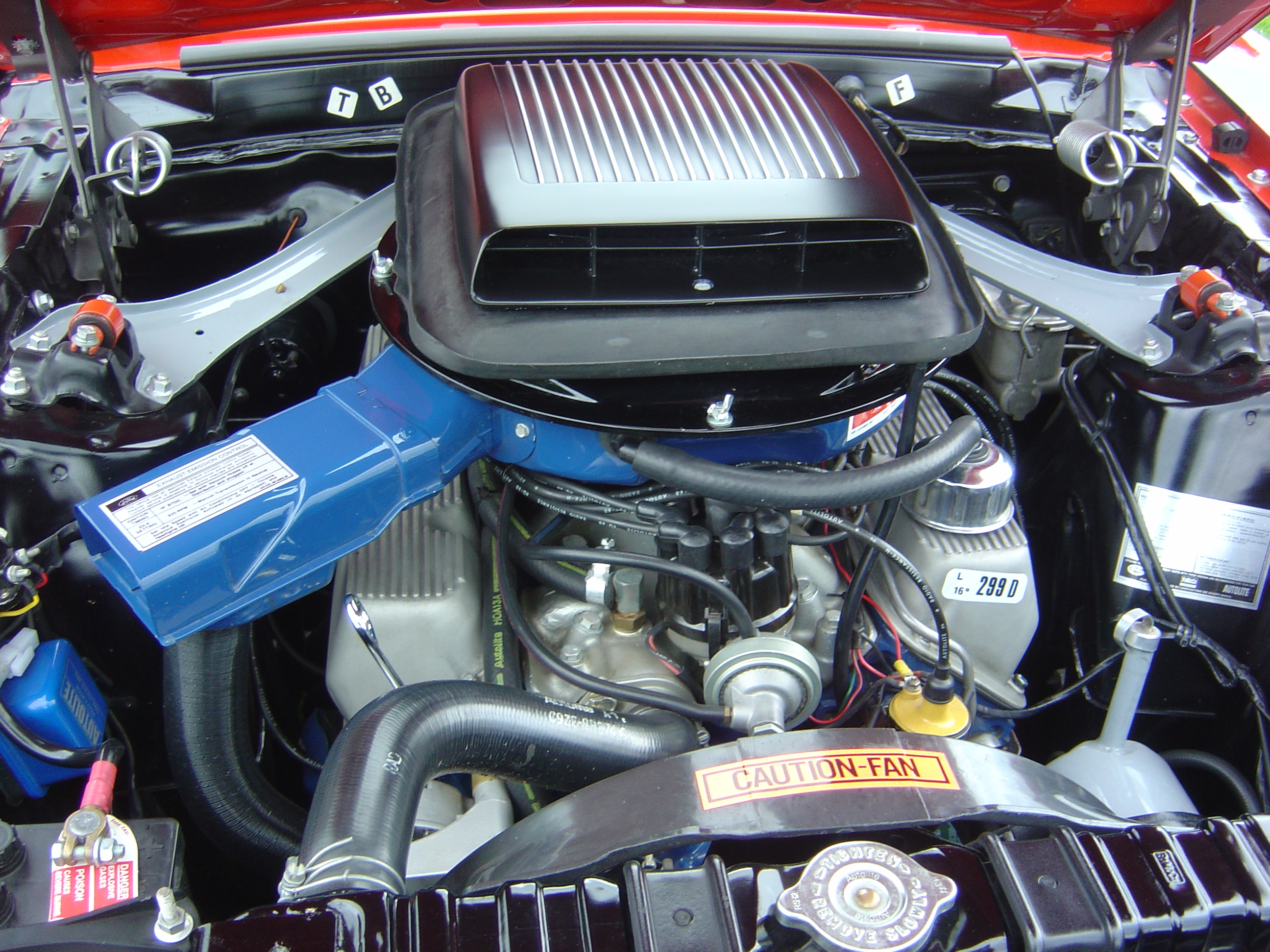
A Ford Boss 302 engine with the optional factory shaker scoop

A shaker scoop (sometimes called a shaker hood scoop or a shaker hood) is an automobile air intake for combustion air that is mounted directly on top of the engine's air cleaner and protrudes through a hole in the hood. Since it is fastened directly to the engine, it moves with the engine's movement and vibration on its mountings, hence the 'shaker' name.

== Design ==
Like all hood scoops, a shaker scoop is intended to provide a direct path for cool, dense air to reach an engine’s air intake, historically a carburetor.

To the extent to which it is possible, a further desired gain is the 'ram air' effect, in theory taking advantage of the vehicle's speed to deliver high-pressure, cool air to the engine over a shorter, less restrictive flow path. However, because engines draw air in hundreds of cubic feet per minute, scoops may not raise intake pressures significantly at low speeds.

=== Origin ===
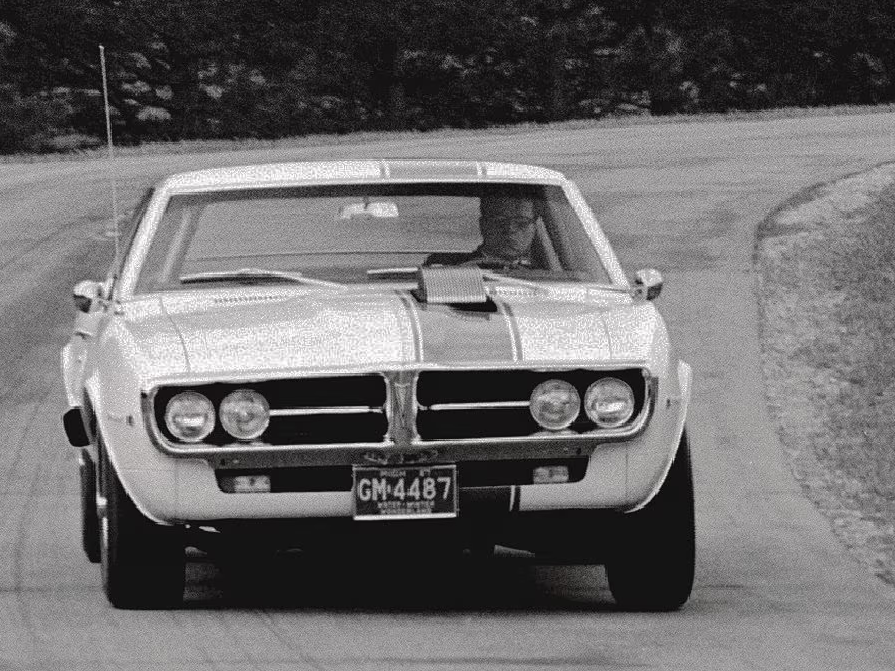
Pontiac Firebird Sprint Turismo prototype, with visible shaker hood scoop

Although Pontiac performance technicians had been adapting intake setups on 1966 GTO’s that would later become known as the maker’s Ram Air packages, the earliest well-documented example of a shaker hood scoop was on the Pontiac Firebird Sprint Turismo prototype, often abbreviated as the PFST. Directed by John DeLorean, the PFST project received a shaker hood entirely out of necessity, when triple two-barrel carburetors were placed atop a straight-6 engine and topped with a large shop-built steel air cleaner. Because the air cleaner did not fit under the hood, the engineers simply cut a hole in it. This, however, is not the same as a true ram-air shaker scoop set-up, which sends air directly down a scoop attached to the engine into its carburetor.

An article on Hot Rod attributes the PFST's featuring in an issue of MotorTrend with Ford getting the idea to put the shaker hood to production.

=== Factory-installed ===
Larry Shinoda of Ford is credited with introducing the shaker hood scoop as a factory option and campaigning to make it functional. First available exclusively for the 1969 model year 428 Cobra Jet Mustang, the option was expanded to other Mustang engines for 1970. Competitors quickly imitated Ford, and Chrysler offered one on the 1970 Plymouth 'cuda and Dodge Challenger, and Pontiac on the 1970 1/2 Firebird Trans Am, which used a backwards-facing scoop to draw air from the high-pressure area at the base of the windshield.

In the 2000s, factory-fitted shaker scoops were reintroduced with the 2003 Ford Mustang Mach 1 and 2014 Dodge Challenger ("Shaker" and "Mopar" models). The 2003–04 Mustang Mach 1 was equipped with a model-specific 32-valve 4.6 L V-8 engine, to fill the performance gap between the less-powerful Mustang GT and the flagship Mustang SVT Cobra. For the 2014 model year, Dodge announced the shaker scoop Challengers as limited-production models at the SEMA show in November 2013; shaker scoop availability was extended in 2015. The shaker package was available through the 2023 model year, when the Challenger was discontinued.

== Examples ==
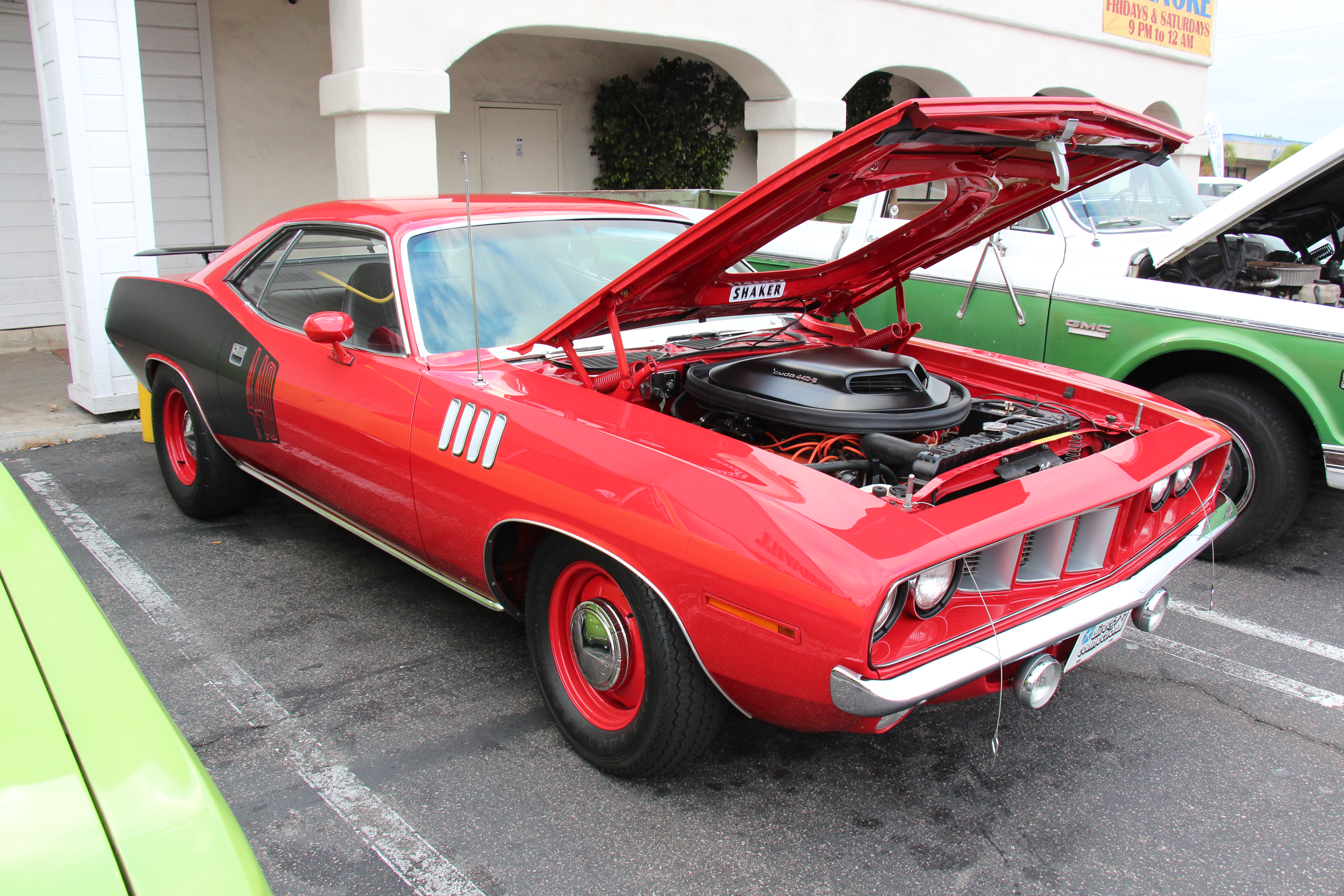
1971 Plymouth Barracuda with 440 6-BBL and shaker scoop

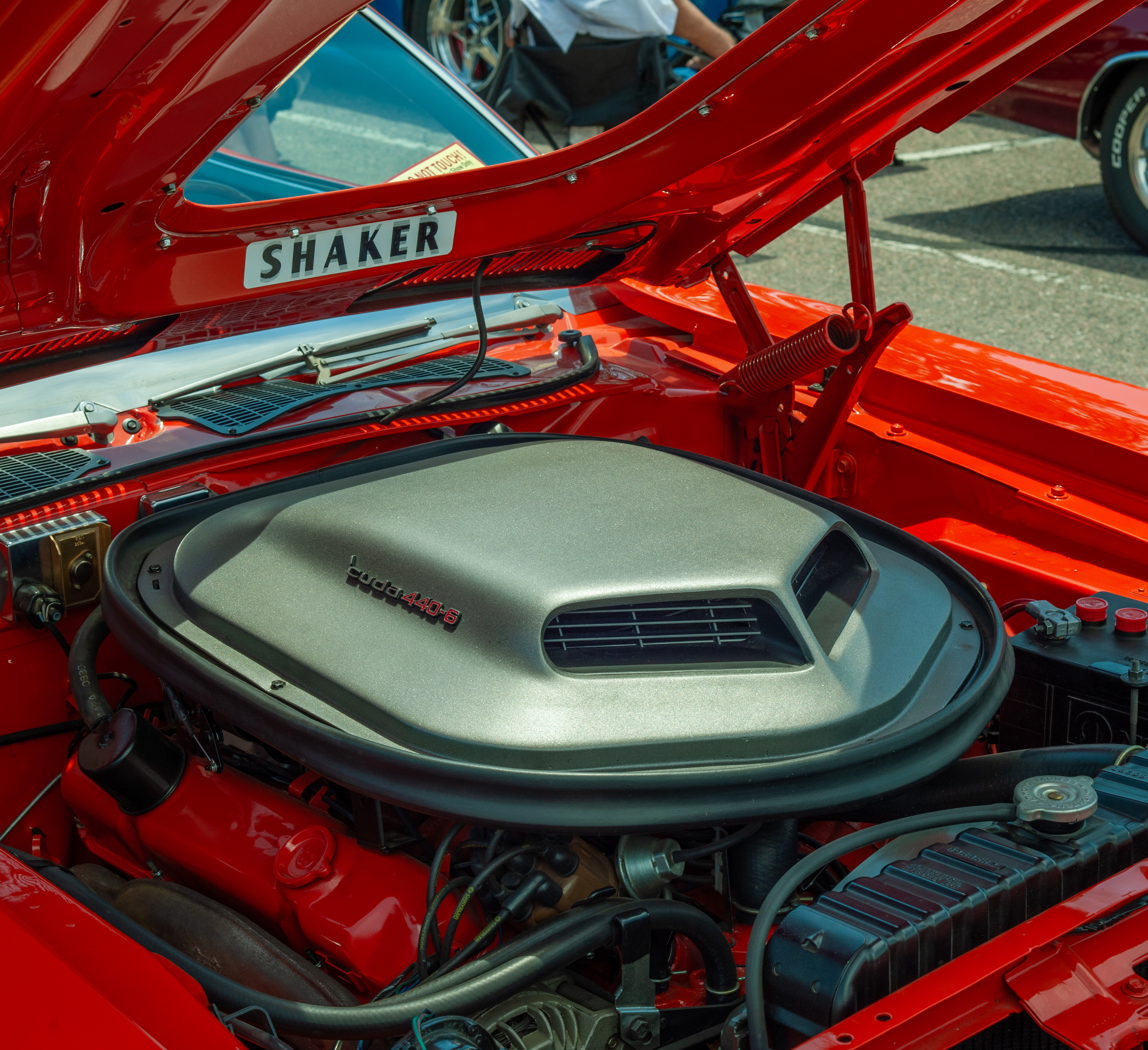
440 Six Pack Shaker Scoop in factory Argent Silver

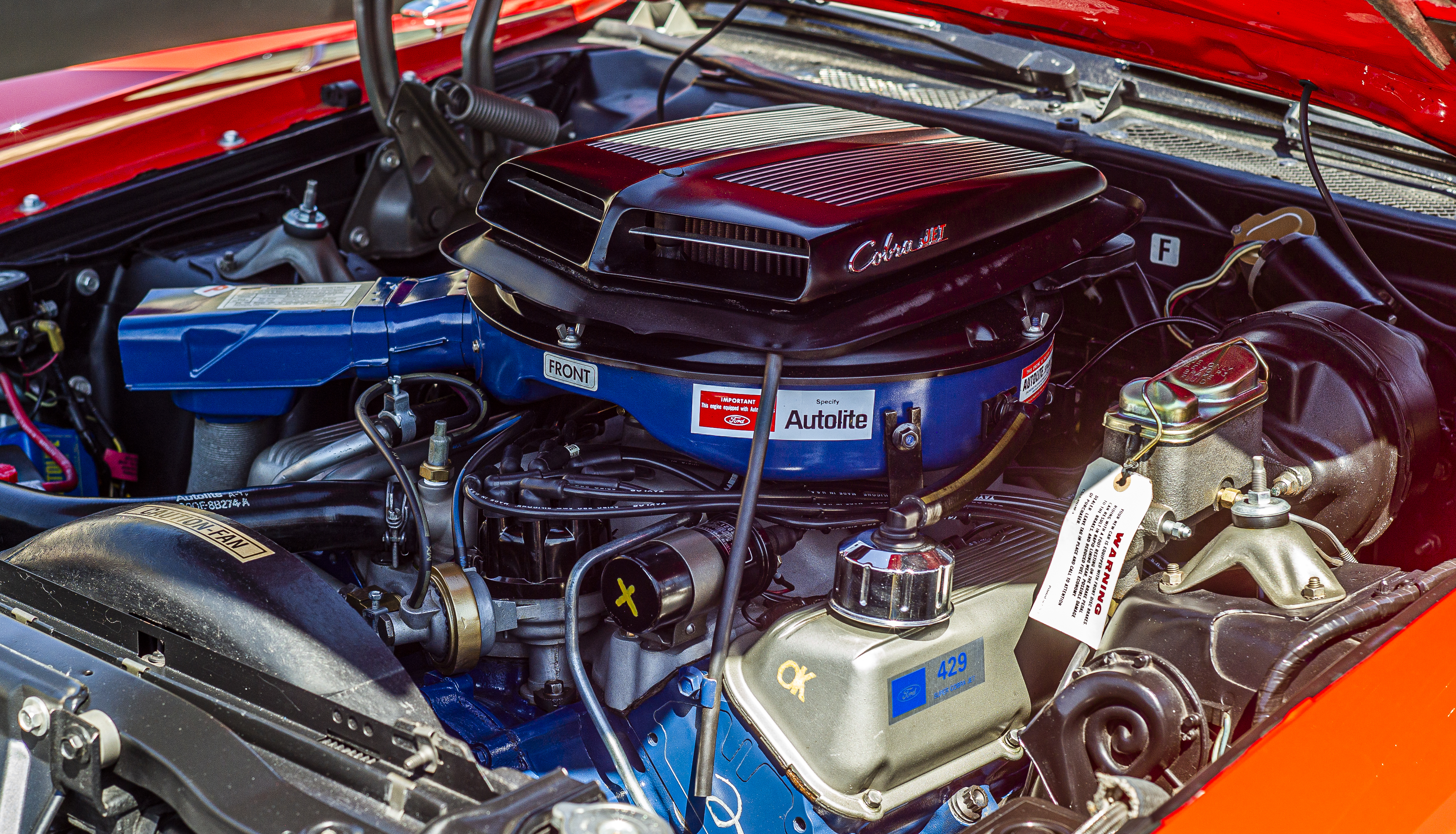
Shaker Scoop and Intake on 1970 Ford Torino with 429 Super Cobra Jet engine

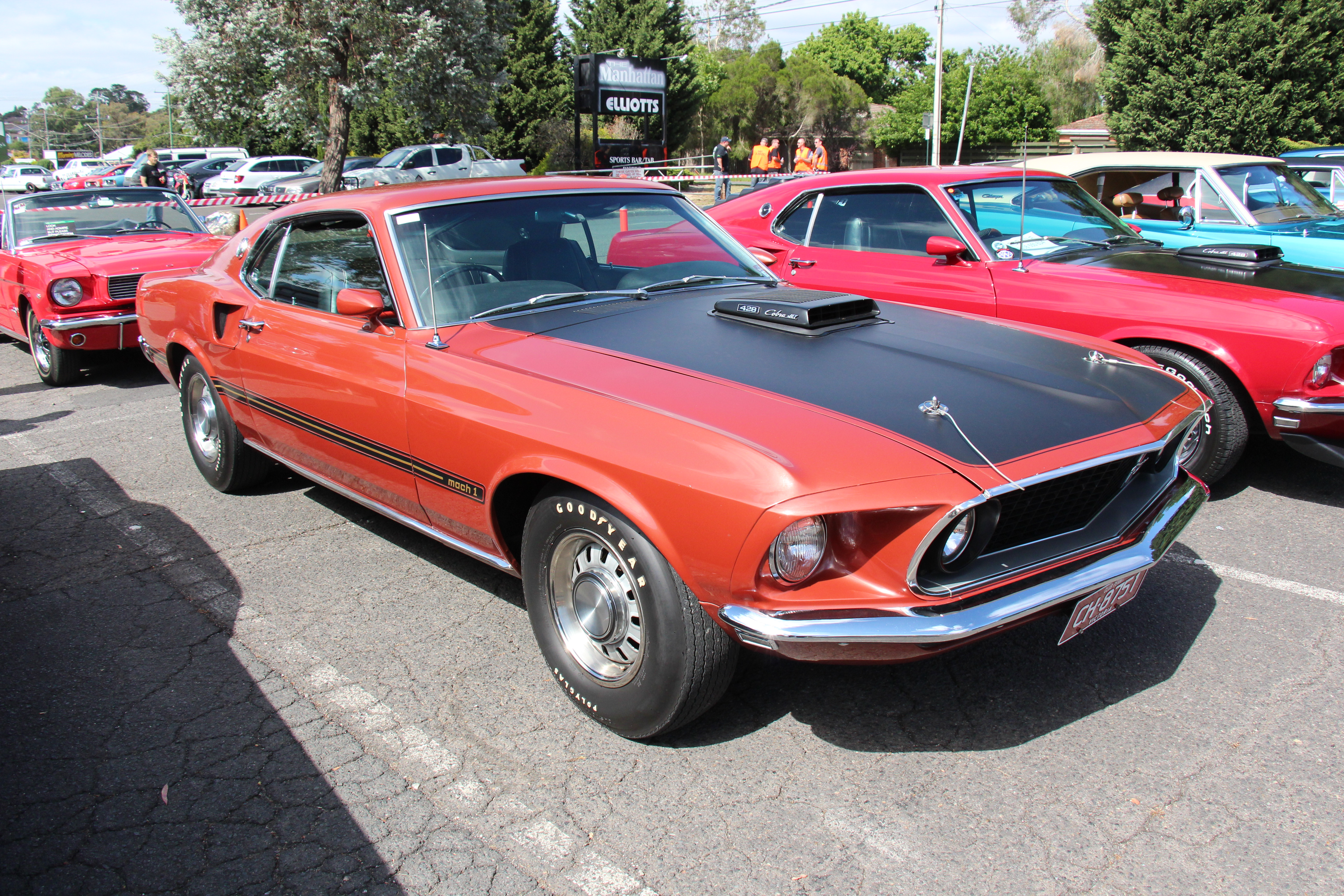
1969 Ford Mustang Mach 1 428 CJ

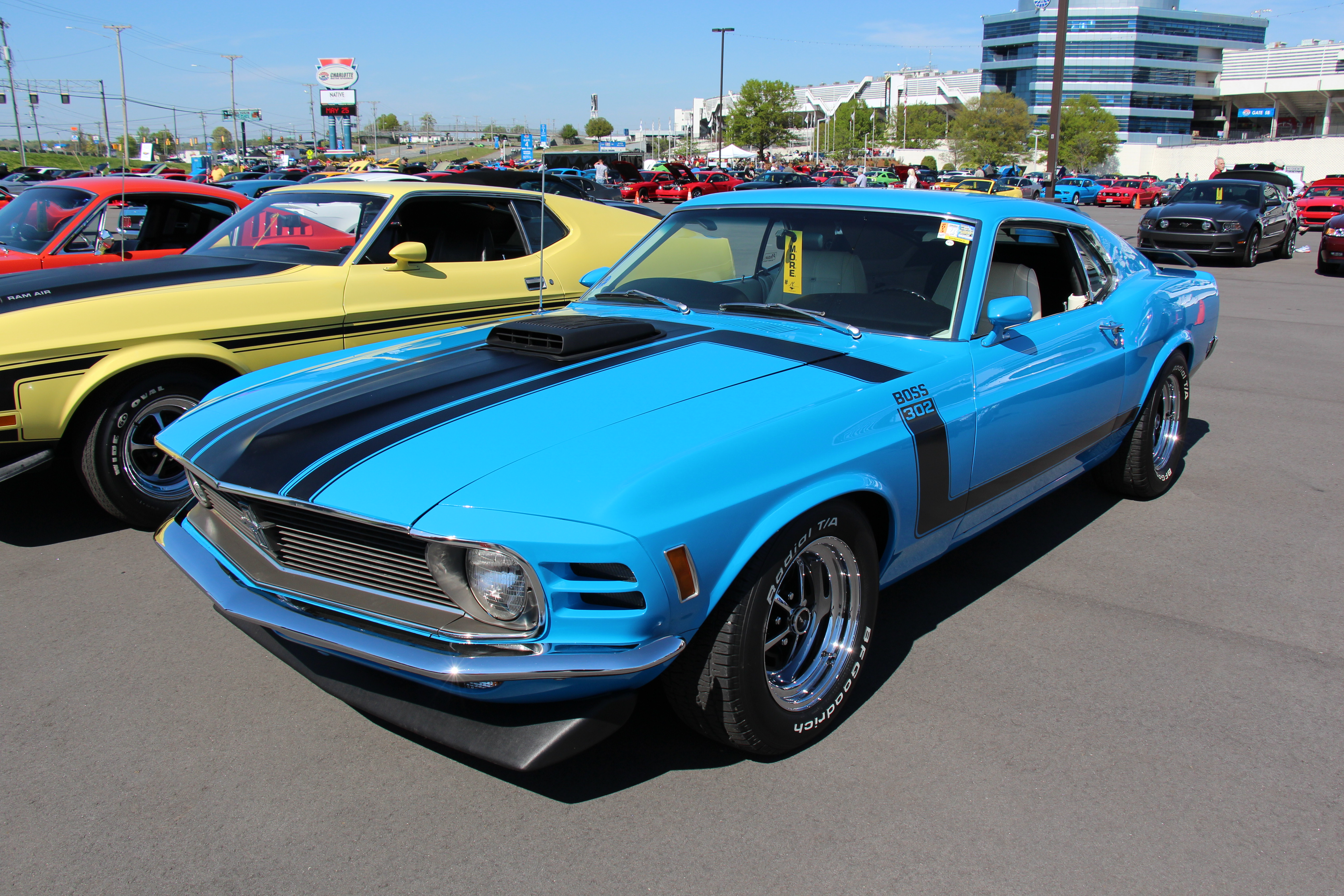
1970 Boss 302 Mustang

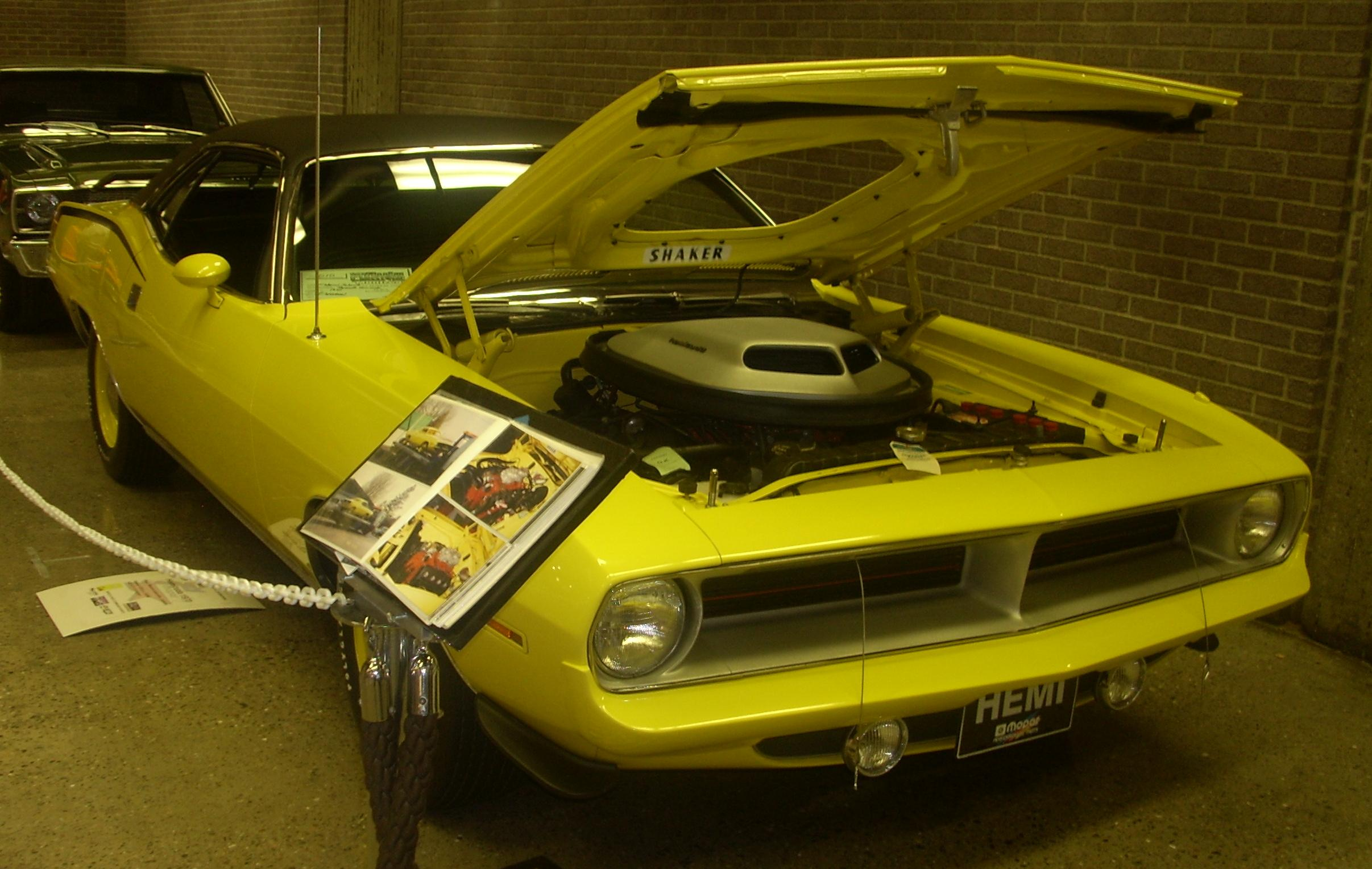
1970 Plymouth 'cuda

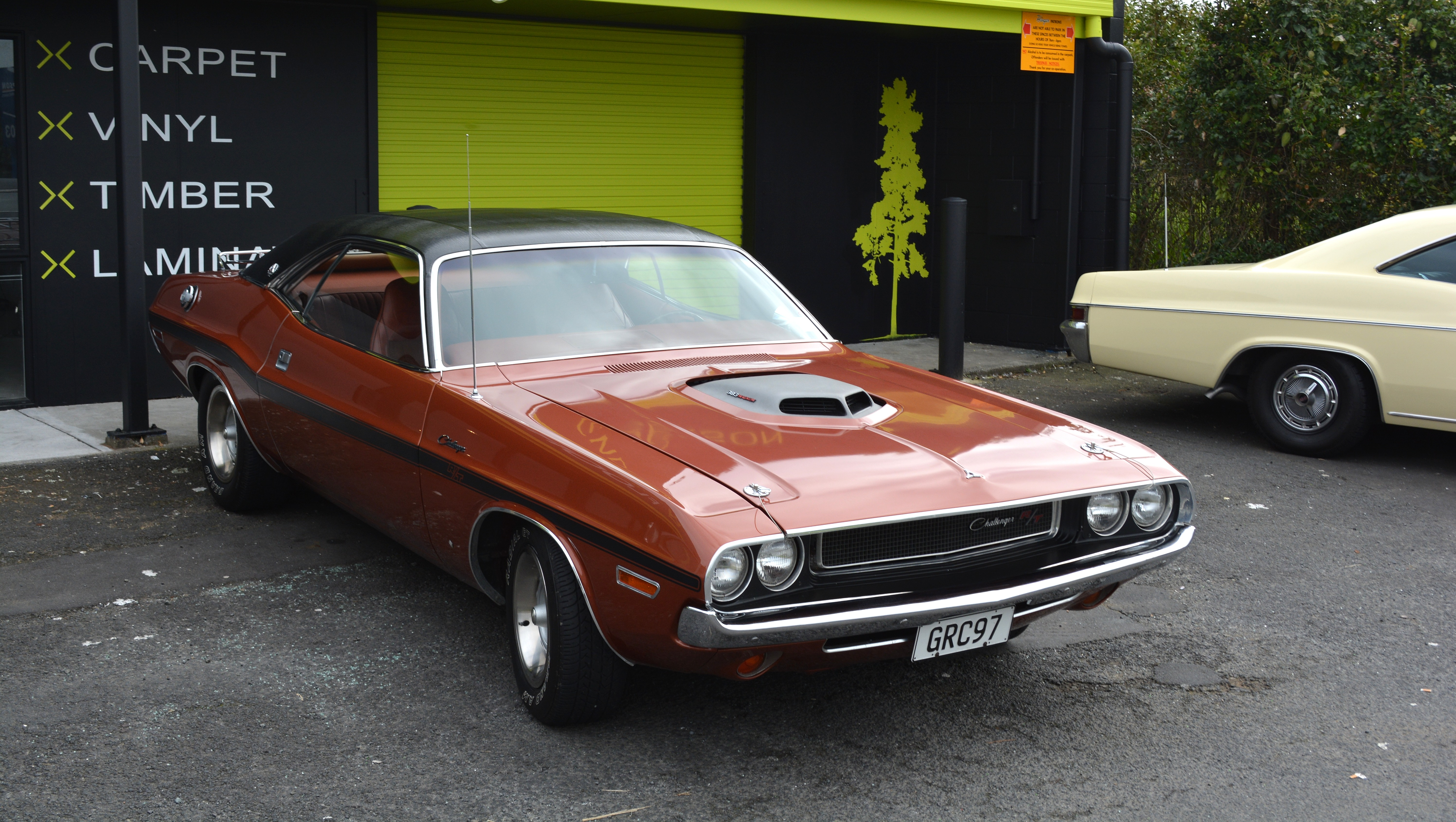
1970 Dodge Challenger

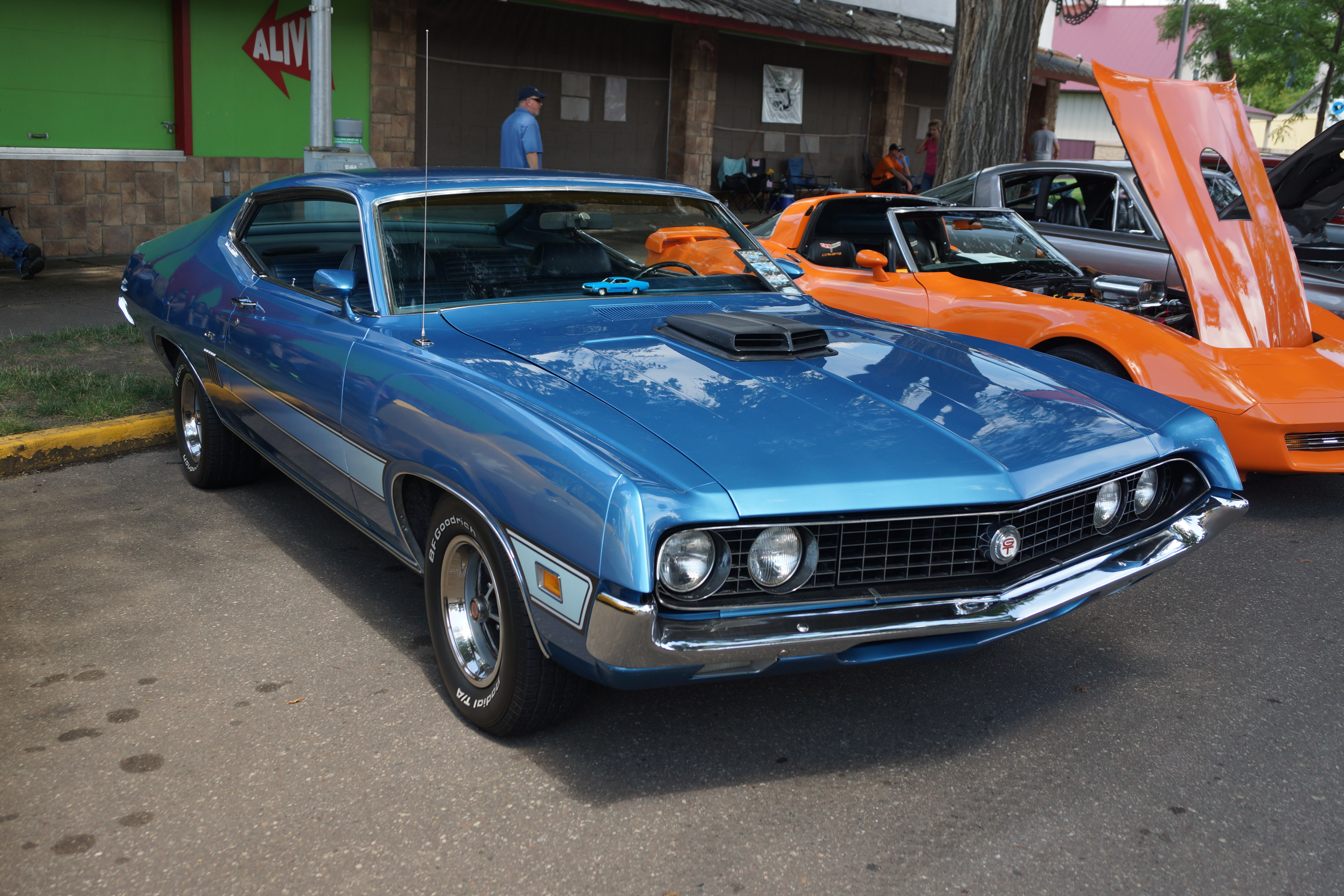
1970 Ford Torino GT

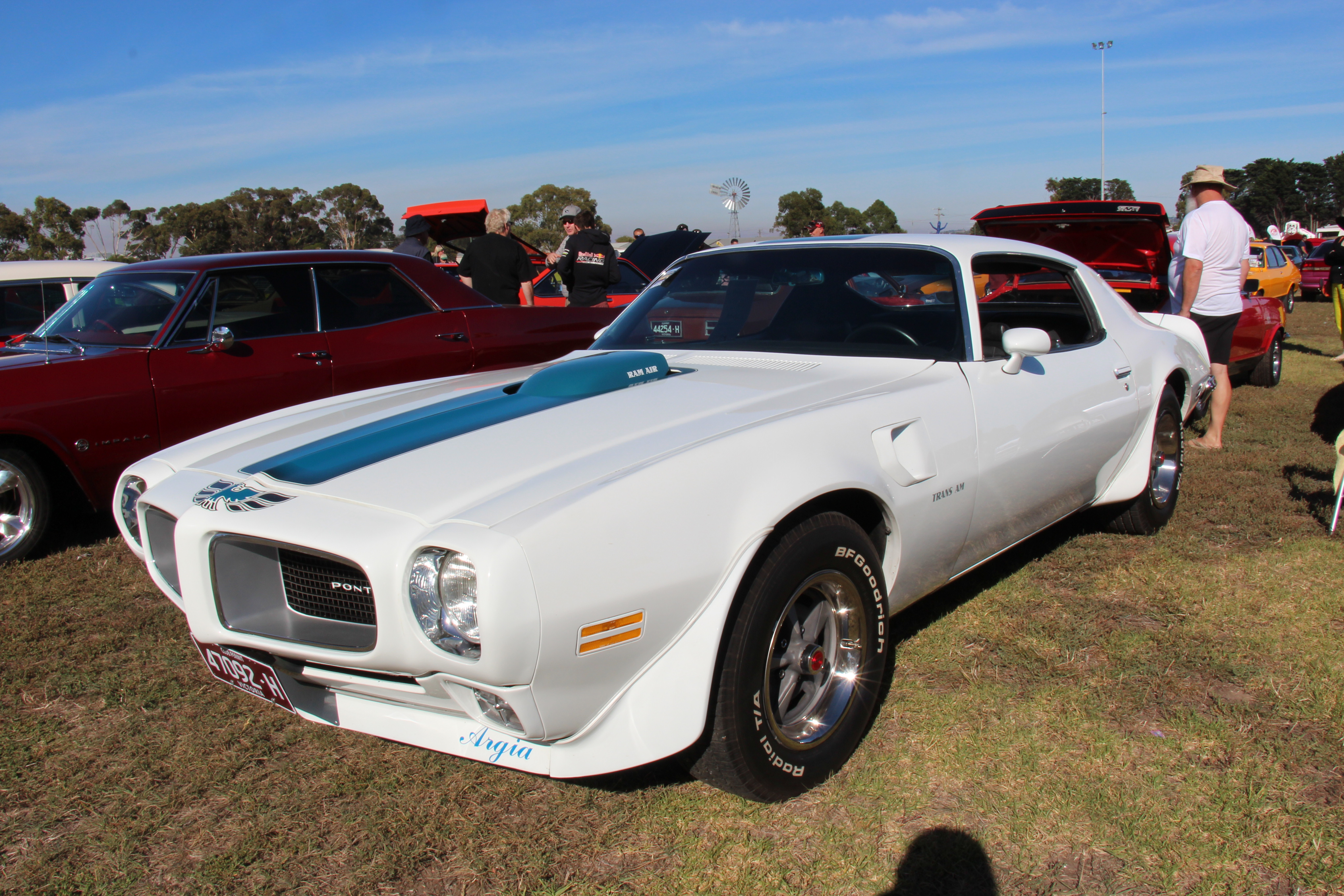
1970 Pontiac Firebird Trans Am

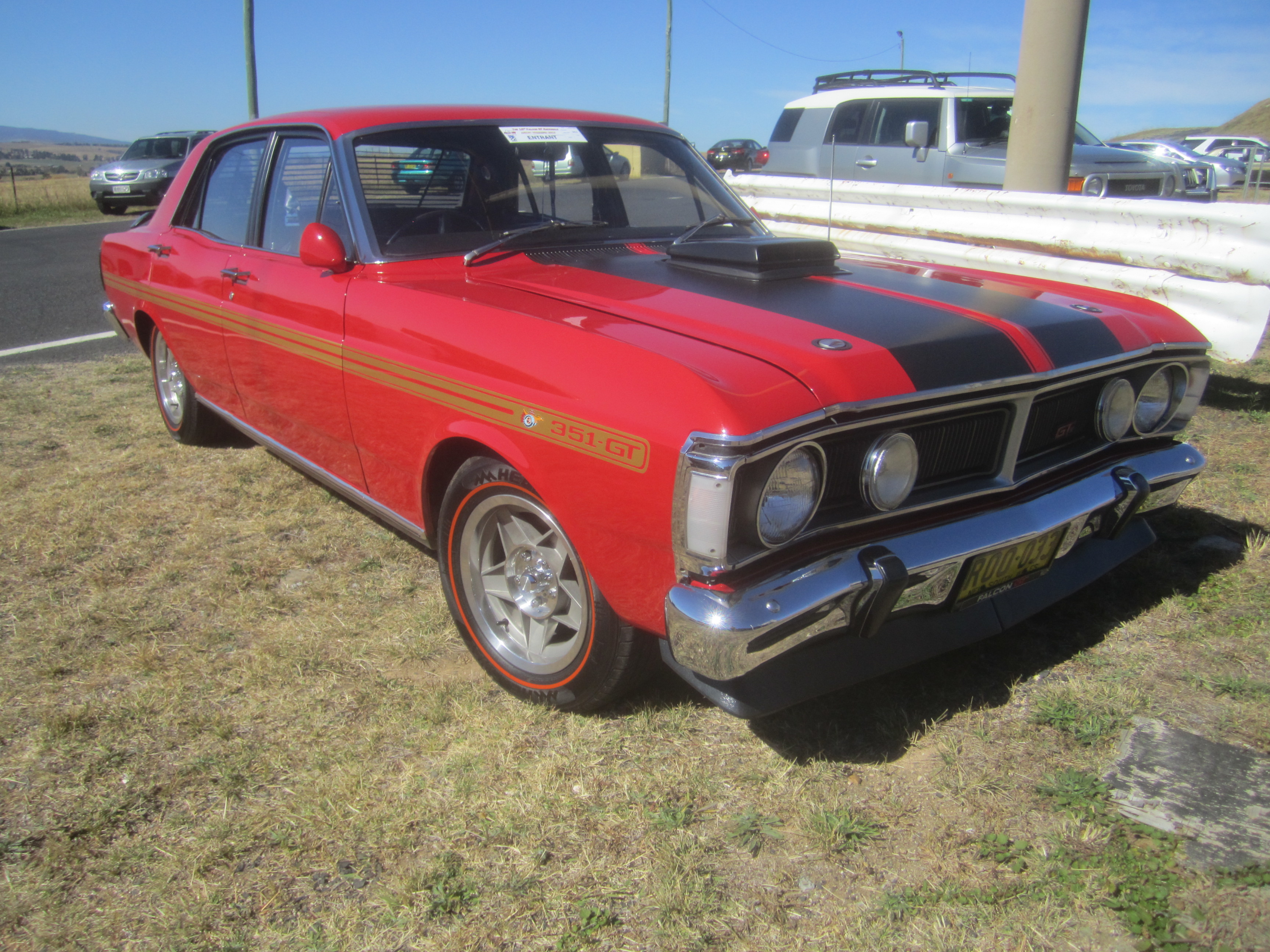
1971 Ford Falcon XY GTHO Phase III

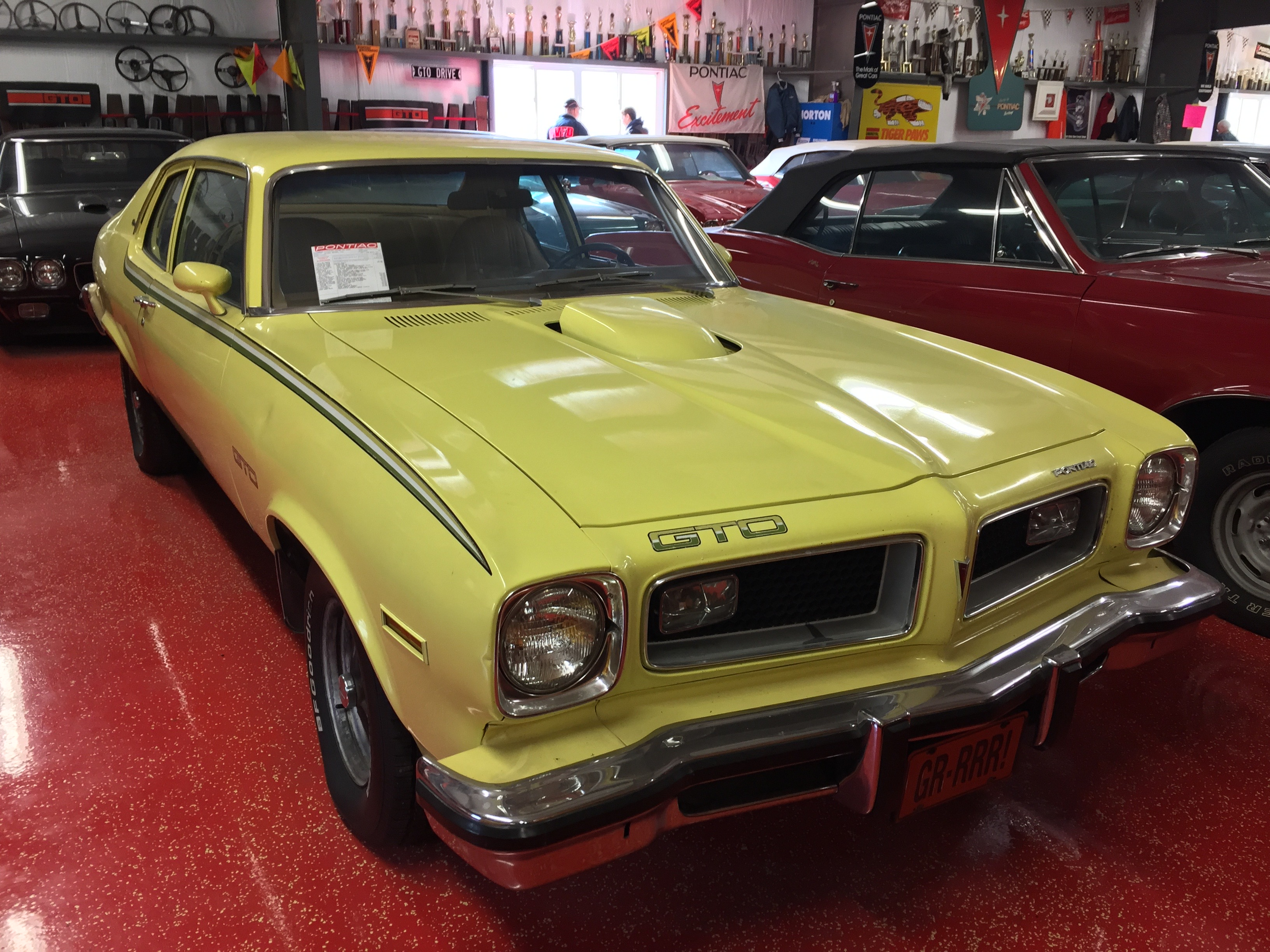
1974 Pontiac Ventura (GTO)

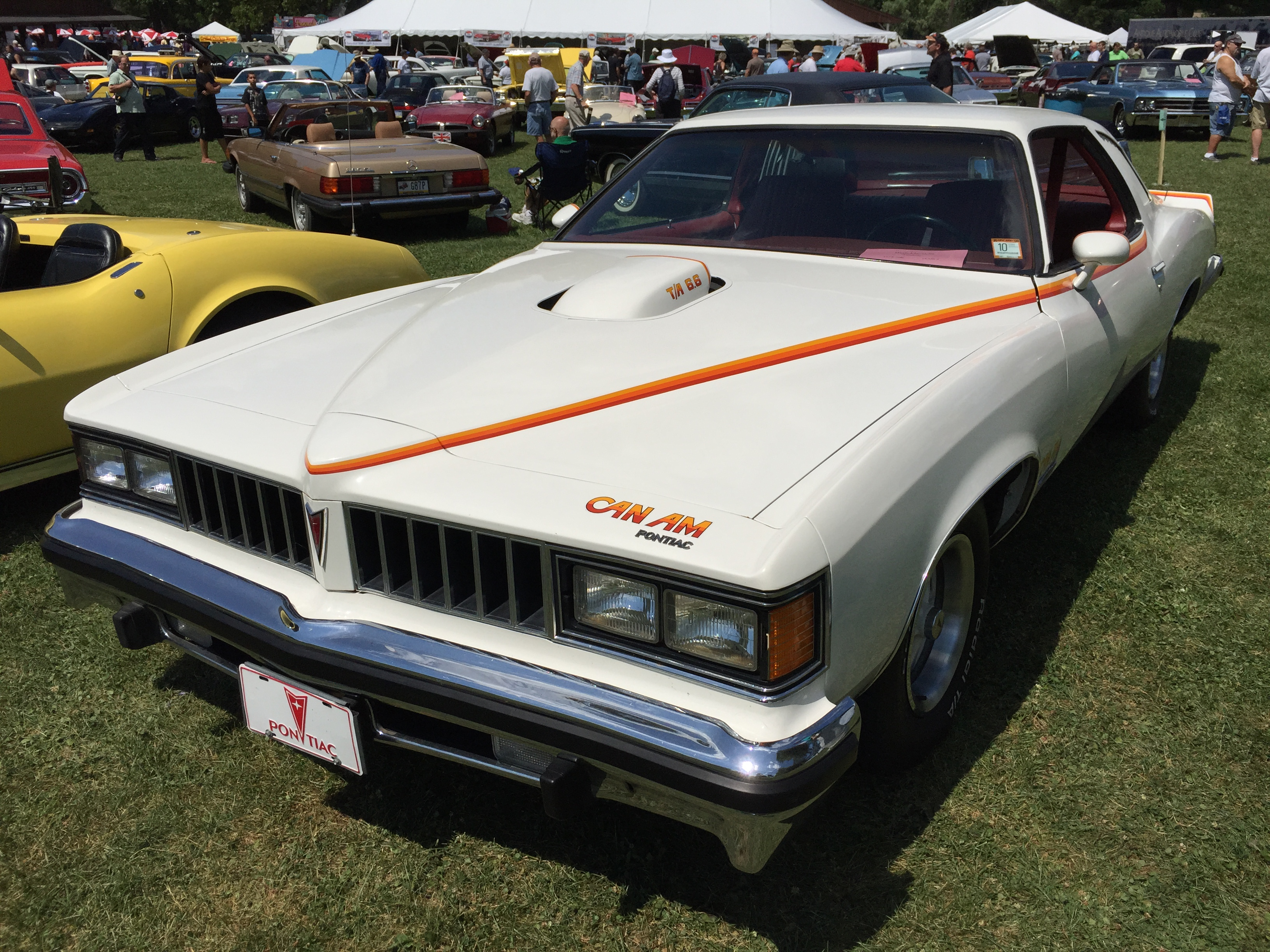
1977 Pontiac Can Am

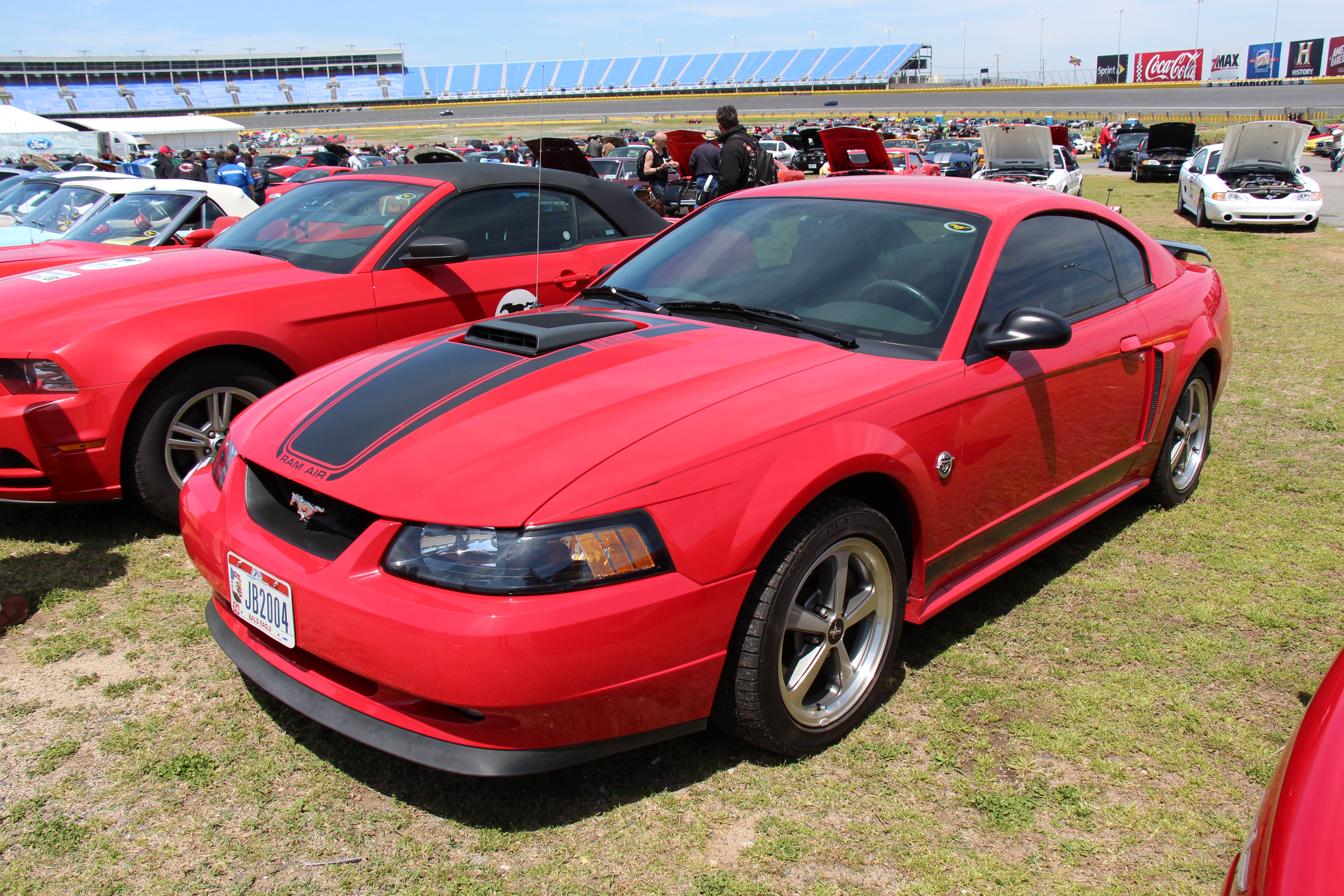
2003 Ford Mustang Mach 1

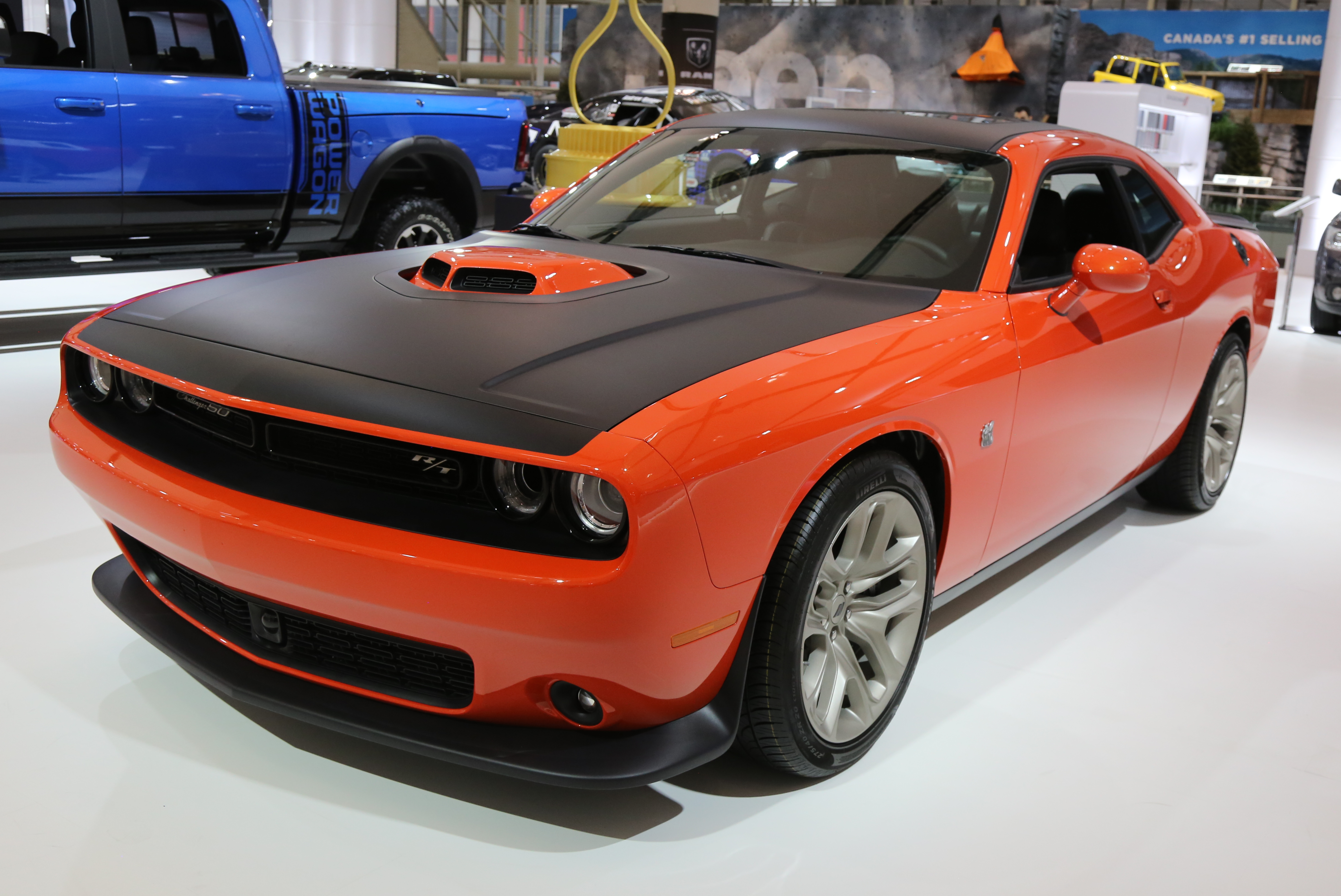
2020 Dodge Challenger R/T 5

Cars available with factory-installed shaker scoops included:

- 1969 Ford Mustang Cobra Jet
- 1970 Boss 302 Mustang
- 1970 Plymouth Barracuda
- Dodge Challenger
- Ford Torino
- Pontiac GTO
- Pontiac Firebird Trans Am
- Pontiac Can Am Grand Am
- Ford Falcon XY GT Phase III
- 2004 Ford Mustang Mach 1
