= Chevrolet Citation =

Compact car manufactured by Chevrolet

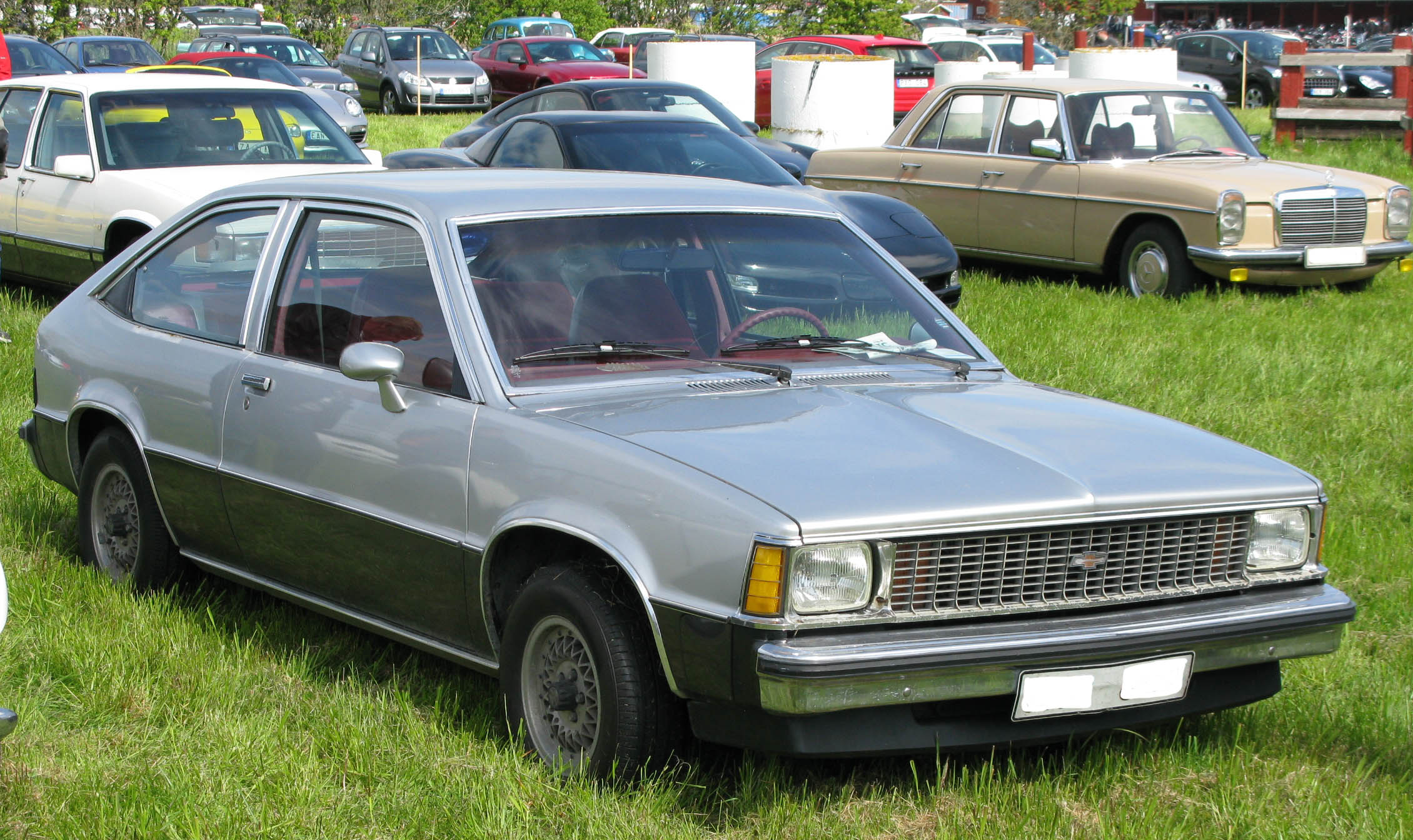
- 1980 Chevrolet Citation 3-door

Overview
- Manufacturer: Chevrolet (General Motors)
- Also called: Chevrolet Citation II (1984-1985)
- Production: 1979–1985
- Model years: 1980–1985
- Assembly: United States: North Tarrytown, New York (North Tarrytown Assembly); Oklahoma City, Oklahoma (Oklahoma City Assembly); Ypsilanti, Michigan (Willow Run Assembly); Mexico: Ramos Arizpe (Ramos Arizpe Assembly)
- Designer: Irv Rybicki

Body and chassis
- Class: Compact
- Body style: 2-door notchback 3-door hatchback 5-door hatchback
- Layout: Transverse front-engine, front-wheel drive
- Platform: X-body
- Related: Buick Skylark; Pontiac Phoenix; Oldsmobile Omega

Powertrain
- Engine: 2.5 L Iron Duke I4; 2.8 L LE2 V6; 2.8 L LH7 HO V6; 2.8 L LB6 MPFI V6
- Transmission: 3-speed TH-125 automatic 4-speed manual

Dimensions
- Wheelbase: 104.9 in (2,664 mm)
- Length: 176.7 in (4,488 mm)
- Width: 68.3 in (1,735 mm)
- Height: 53.9 in (1,369 mm)

Chronology
- Predecessor: Chevrolet Nova
- Successor: Chevrolet Corsica; Chevrolet Beretta

The Chevrolet Citation is a compact car that was manufactured and marketed by Chevrolet from the 1980 to 1985 model years. The first front-wheel drive car sold by Chevrolet, the Citation replaced the Chevrolet Nova as its compact car line. Initially positioned between the Chevrolet Monza and the Chevrolet Malibu in the Chevrolet product line, the model line was later marketed between the Chevrolet Cavalier and the Chevrolet Celebrity.

The Citation marked the transition of the GM X platform compact-car architecture to a front-wheel drive layout. Following the downsizing of the GM full-size and mid-size car lines for 1977 and 1978, the X platform was itself resized to better match the exterior footprint of the revised larger product lines. Sharing a common chassis architecture with the Buick Skylark, Oldsmobile Omega, and Pontiac Phoenix, the Citation was offered in three body styles, including three-door and five-door hatchback coupes (the latter, shared with the Phoenix). While all four model lines received a two-door notchback coupe, the Citation was styled with a model-exclusive roofline. Alongside a standard trim level, the Citation X-11 was offered as a performance-oriented variant.

General Motors assembled the model line alongside the Skylark and Phoenix in its North Tarrytown Assembly (North Tarrytown, New York), Oklahoma City Assembly (Oklahoma City, Oklahoma), and Ramos Arizpe Assembly (Ramos Arizpe, Mexico) facilities; it did not share production with the Oldsmobile Omega. Following its withdrawal after the 1985 model year, Chevrolet replaced it during 1987 with the Chevrolet Beretta coupe and Chevrolet Corsica sedan/hatchback. In total, Chevrolet manufactured 1,642,587 examples of the model line during its production run.

== Development ==
To better compete in the compact segment following the 1973 fuel crisis, General Motors commenced work in April 1974 on a replacement for its X-body compact lines, a model family that included the Chevrolet Nova and its divisional counterparts. As the 1970s progressed, the popularity of import-brand vehicles (such as the Honda Accord and the Volkswagen Rabbit) led to declining market share held by American manufacturers in the compact segment. Though downsizing of the full-size B and C-body platforms and the A-body mid-size lines was crucial to the future of the company, the two redesigns placed GM model hierarchy out of alignment; though officially a compact, the X-body Nova became dimensionally larger than the Malibu (a year after becoming closer in size to the Caprice than the Chevette).

To realign the X-body platform in size between the A-body and the H-body subcompacts, GM commenced a redesign of its compact lines in 1974. Intended for a 1978 introduction, the Condor was to be introduced as the replacement for the outgoing Nova. Along with a major reduction in exterior footprint (sized between the Vega and Monza in length), the X-body platform was adopting the transverse front-wheel drive layout used by its competitors. Though GM had pioneered the use of front-wheel drive in postwar American vehicles (with the 1966 Oldsmobile Toronado), its experience with the layout was limited to longitudinal powertrains (large-block V8s for the Toronado, Cadillac Eldorado, and GMC Motorhome). To gain insight towards front-wheel drive vehicles powered by inline-4 engines, the company acquired multiple Lancia vehicles for testing and reverse engineering. During the summer of 1976, the first X-body prototypes entered testing.

As chassis design for the front-wheel drive X-body evolved, design work was delegated between divisions. Chevrolet was responsible for the front suspension design, with Pontiac to develop the rear suspension. The 2.5L inline-4 was a Pontiac-designed engine along with a 2.8L Chevrolet-developed V6. Though far smaller than its predecessor, the new X-body remained among the largest designs in its segment, using a 105-inch wheelbase. In contrast to the fastback coupe and hatchback and the four-door sedan of the previous generation, the downsized platform was to offer multiple designs specific to each division. For Chevrolet, the Condor was to be offered as a two-door coupe and three-door and five-door hatchbacks.

While the Chevrolet Condor was originally intended for a 1978 model-year release (to compete against the Ford Fairmont and the smaller Dodge Omni/Plymouth Horizon), its launch was postponed into early 1979. Though design work was completed, company parts supplies and tooling were not yet ready to match the production of a vehicle replacing the Chevrolet Nova. During the delay, Chevrolet dropped the Condor nameplate in favor of Citation.

== History ==
Released in April 1979 as a 1980 model-year vehicle, the Chevrolet Citation replaced the Chevrolet Nova as the compact car line for the division; it also became the first Chevrolet to feature front-wheel drive. Downsized nearly as extensively as the Caprice/Impala and the Malibu, the Citation shed 20 inches of length, 4 inches of width, and 800 pounds from its 1979 Nova predecessor (making it only an inch longer than the final Vega). The interior design underwent substantial dimensional upgrades, rivaling the Malibu in passenger space and the Impala/Caprice in trunk space.

Coinciding with its early-spring launch and the timing of its release (a fuel-efficient design during a fuel shortage), the 1980 Citation became one of the most successful product launches in General Motors history; over 810,000 examples were sold, with the Citation becoming the best-selling car in the United States for 1980.

=== 1980 ===
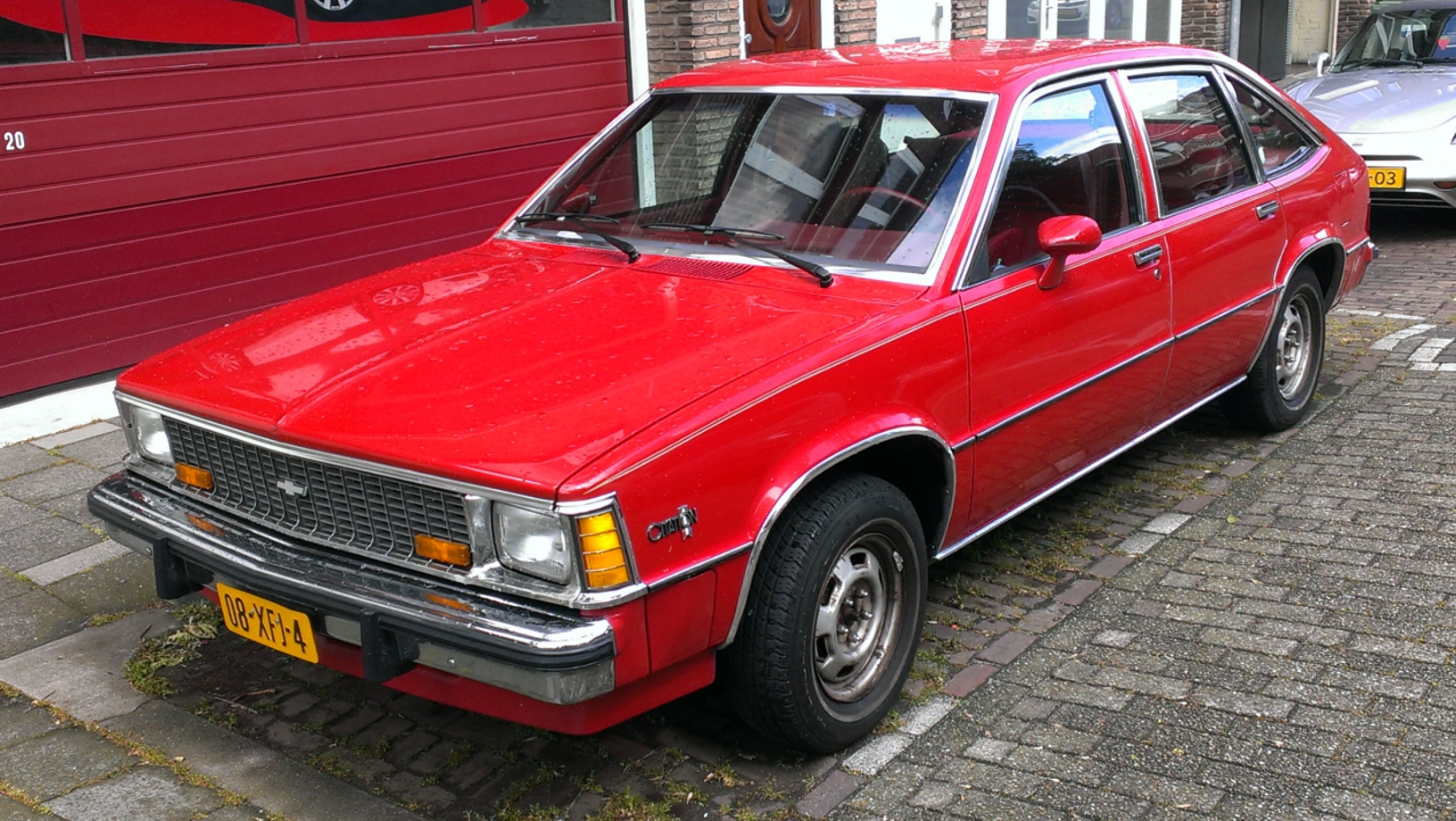
1980 Citation 5-door

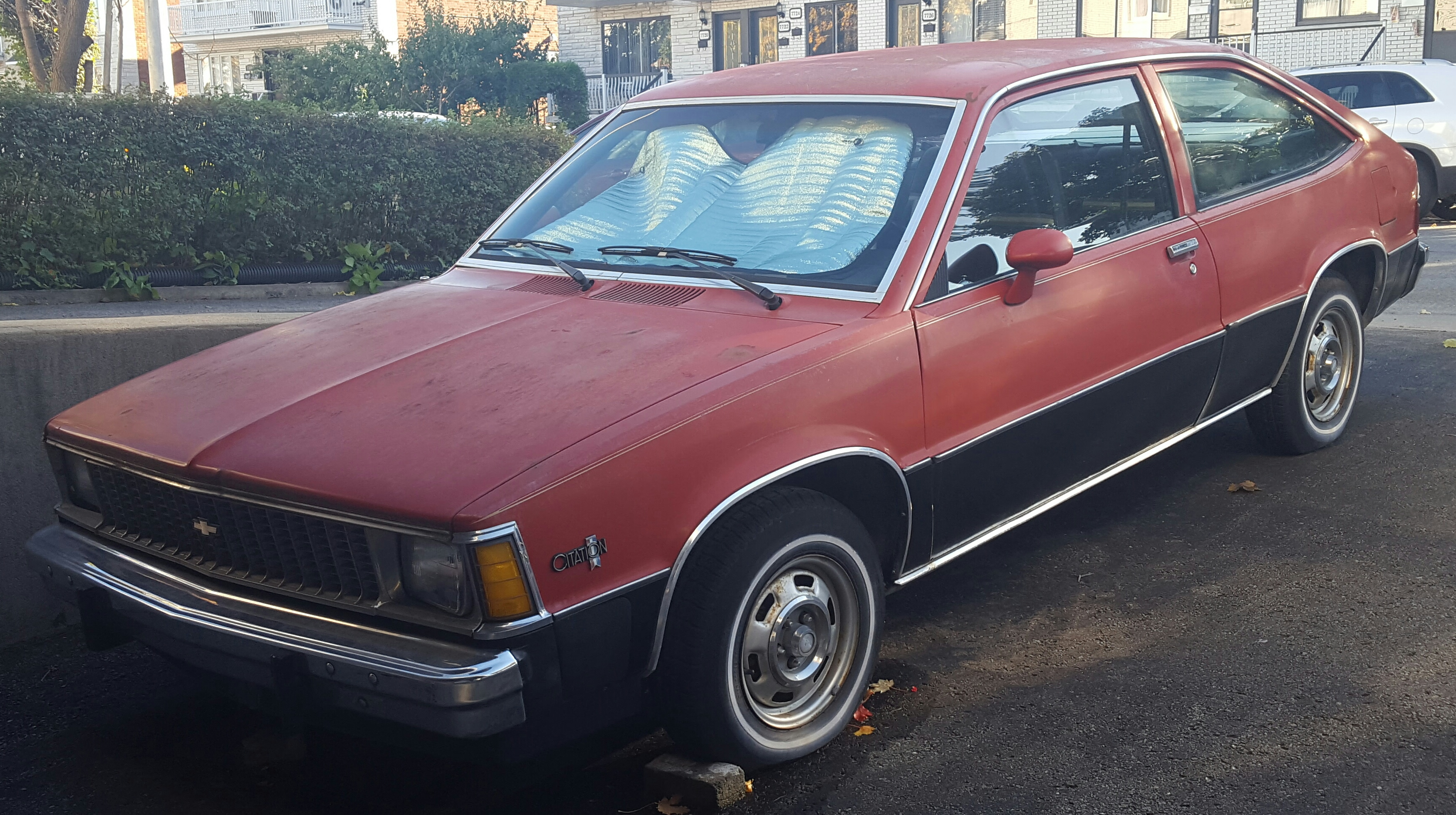
1980 Citation 3-door

The 1980 Chevrolet Citation was released in three body styles, including a two-door coupe and three-door and five-door hatchbacks (the first two designs were offered only for the Citation and not shared with any other X-body car). Alongside the standard trim, a sporty X-11 version was produced. At $4,800, the base price of the Citation was more expensive than a fully equipped 1979 Nova.

Though closer in size to the Honda Accord than the Dodge Omni/Plymouth Horizon, the three-door and five-door hatchbacks proved popular, accounting for nearly 85% of sales. The high demand for the model line, coinciding with a second fuel crisis, left GM with significant shortages of the standard 2.5L engine, with some customers waiting several months to receive their vehicles. Before the release of the model line, Chevrolet had anticipated 70% of Citation customers would purchase the optional 2.8L V6, leading its production lines backlogged under the high demand for the inline-4 engine.

=== 1981 ===
For 1981, the Citation saw few visual changes, following its success the year before. The eggcrate-style grille was revised and amber lenses were added for the rear turn signals. The two-door coupe was dropped from the model line, with all Citations produced as hatchbacks. The X-11 (see below) saw several performance upgrades, including the addition of a 135hp "high-output" 2.8L V6.

Sales of the model line dropped by nearly 50%. Coinciding with approximately six months shorter of a model year, 1981 saw the introduction of additional competitors for the Citation, as Chrysler introduced the Dodge Aries/Plymouth Reliant (the Chrysler K-Cars); along with more traditional styling for buyers, the Aries/Reliant included notchback sedan and station wagon models unavailable for the Citation.

=== 1982 ===
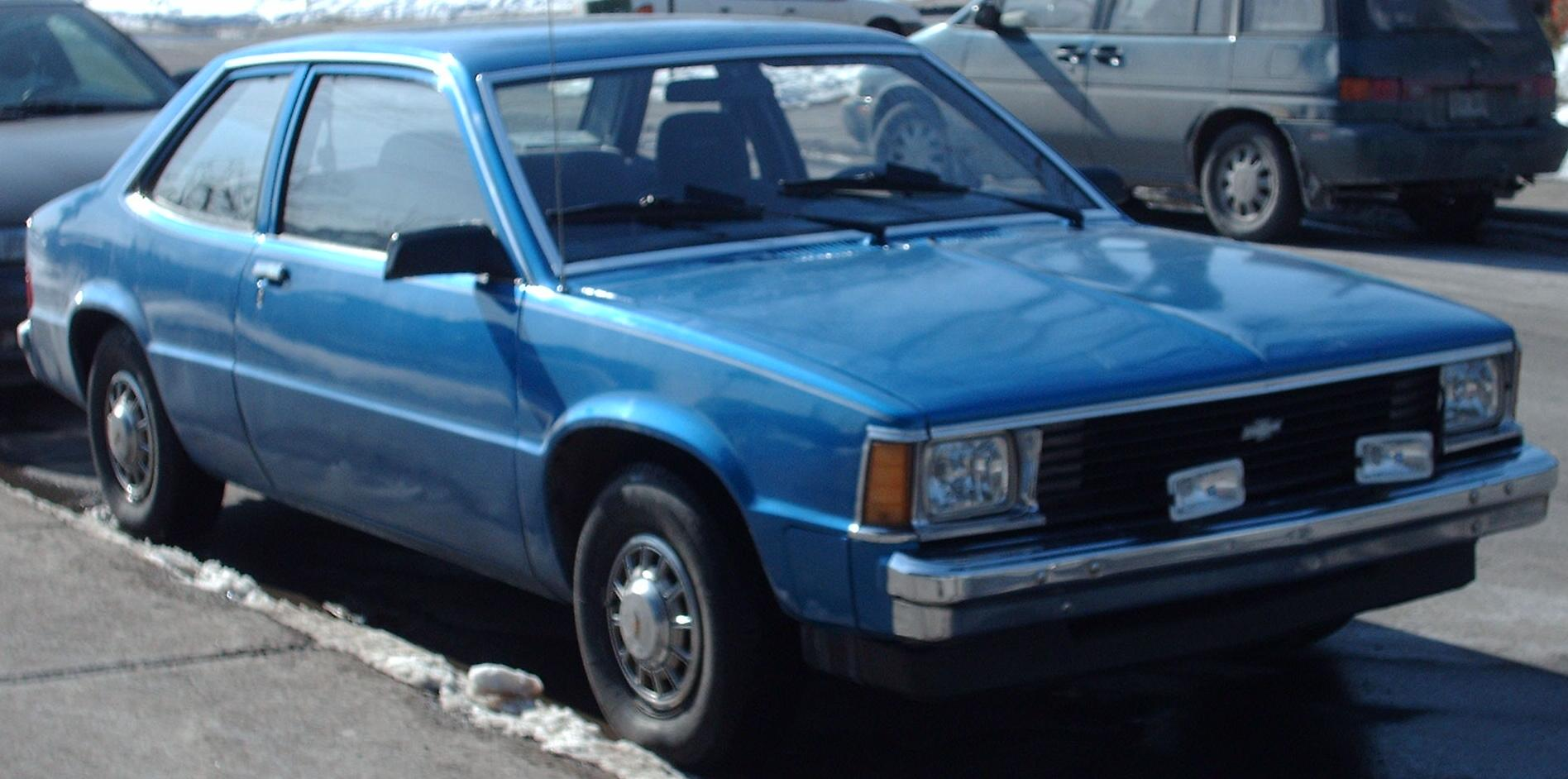
1982 Chevrolet Citation 2-door coupe

For 1982, the Citation underwent a minor exterior revision, as the eggcrate grille was replaced with a horizontally slatted grille design (taking on the design of the Malibu). After sitting out for 1981, the two-door coupe made its return as a running change during the model year.

To improve fuel economy, the 2.5L engine moved to fuel injection; the entire production (including the X-11) was switched to low rolling-resistance tires.

Sales of the model year decreased over 60% from 1981, coinciding from several factors. In addition to negative publicity stemming from large safety recalls of the model line, the Citation faced a much greater degree of internal competition as Chevrolet introduced additional front-wheel drive lines. For 1982, the Cavalier (J-car, subcompact) replaced the Monza/Vega, offering coupe, hatchback, sedan, and station wagon designs. The Celebrity (A-car, mid-size) replaced the Malibu, offering 2/4-door sedans, and a 5-door station wagon; the front-wheel drive Celebrity shared its chassis underpinnings (including its wheelbase) with the Citation. Several competing import vehicles underwent design changes, as the Honda Accord underwent its first redesign and the Toyota Camry was introduced (featuring an optional 5-door hatchback).

=== 1983 ===
For 1983, Chevrolet concentrated its revisions on the interior, with a nearly unchanged exterior. To provide less competition for the larger Celebrity and bring the Citation in line with its import-brand competitors, the full-width bench seat was deleted, with all versions receiving bucket seats in their place. In addition, the dashboard underwent minor updates.

The 1983 Citation struggled in sales, selling only 92,000 units.

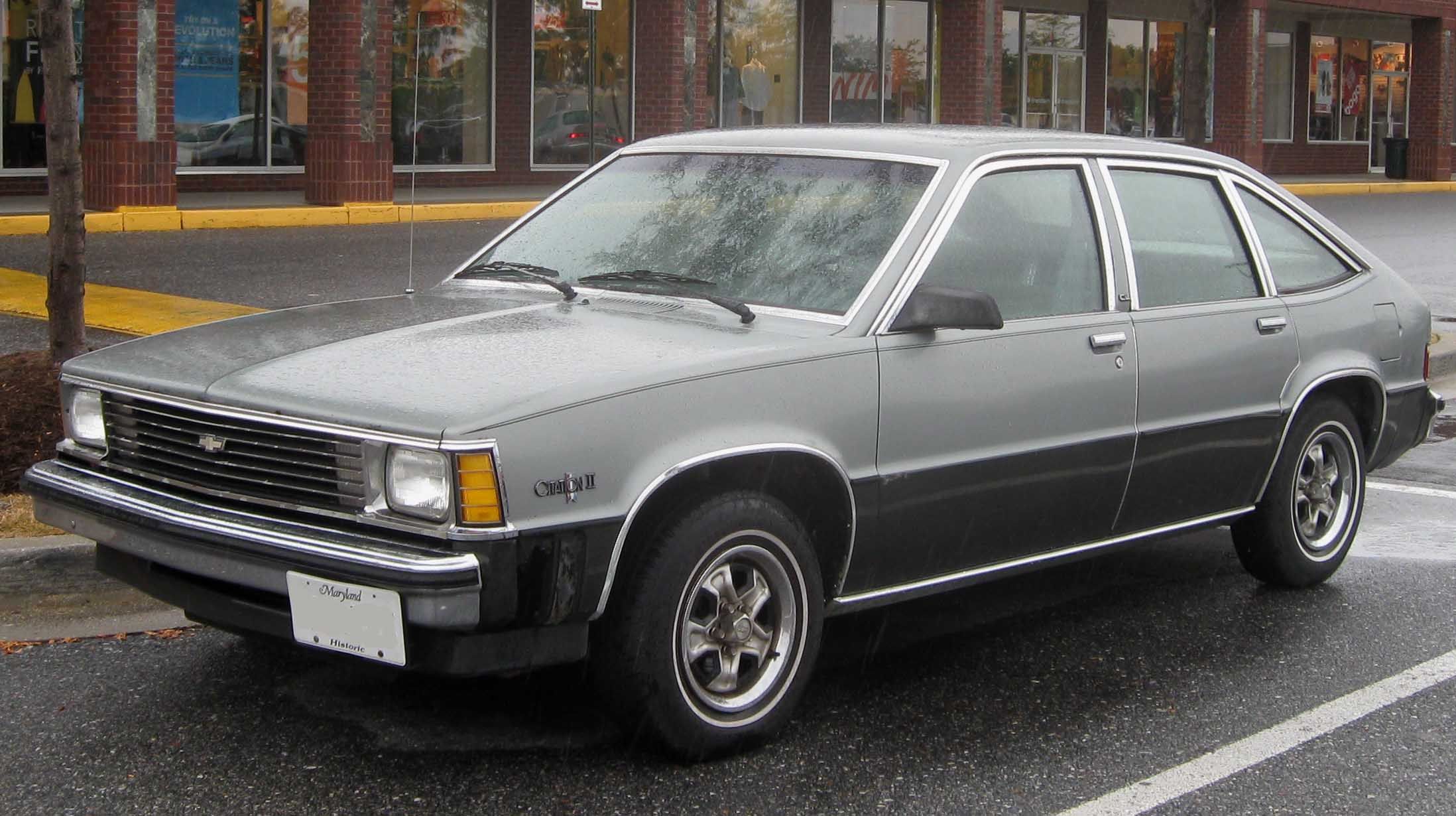
Chevrolet Citation II

=== Citation II (1984-1985) ===
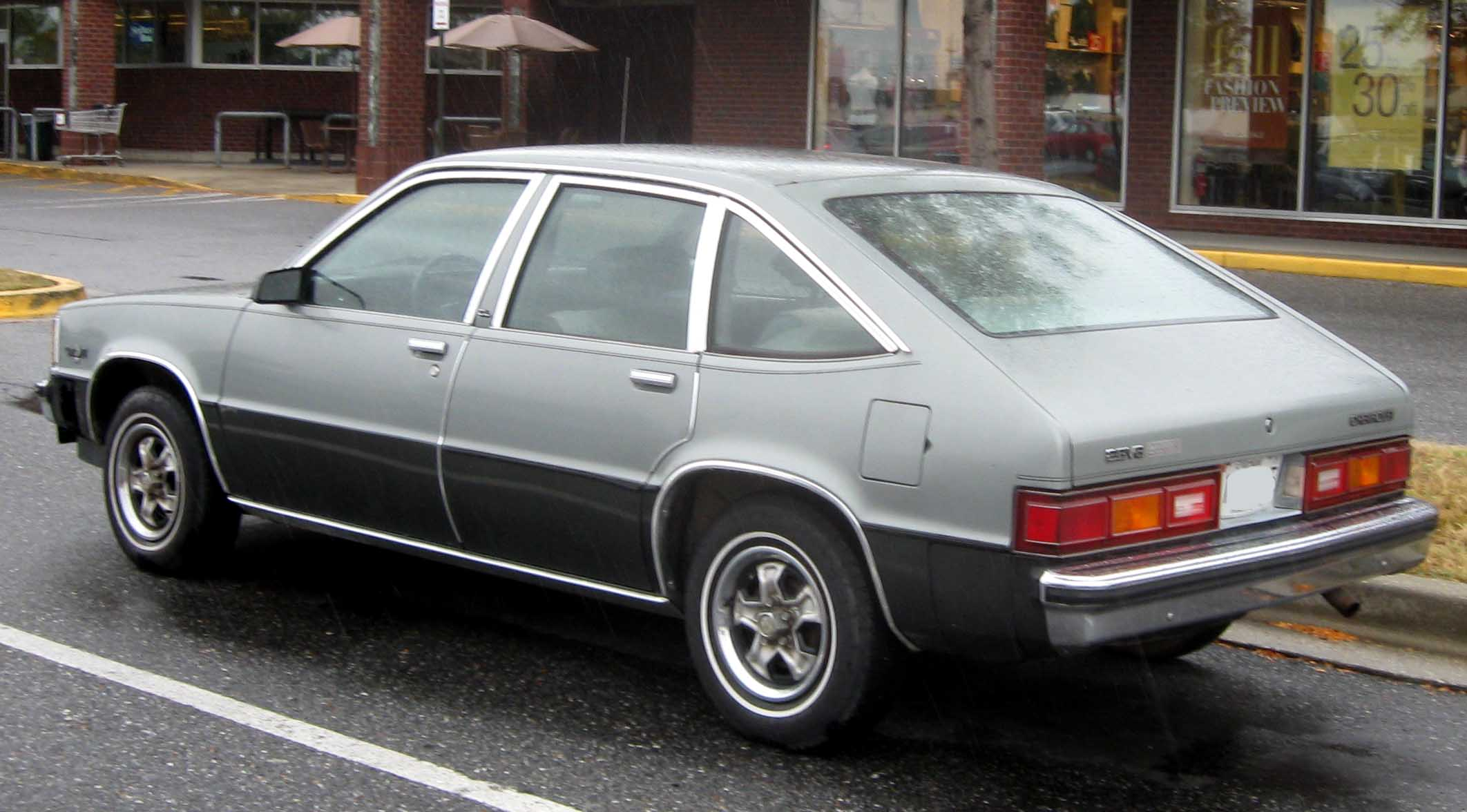
Chevrolet Citation II, rear

For 1984, Chevrolet rebranded its Citation line, renaming it the Citation II. Intended to draw attention away from previous safety recalls and quality issues, the Citation II was only nominally changed from 1983 (distinguished by decklid badging revisions). The two-door coupe was carried over, along with both hatchbacks; the X-11 made its return.

For the first time in its production, the model line gained sales over the previous year; at less than 100,000 units, the Citation II lagged far behind the Cavalier and Celebrity in sales.

1985 marked the final year for the Citation. Now only sold with the Buick Skylark, Chevrolet dropped the Citation II coupe, leaving only the hatchbacks. The dashboard was revised to accommodate a horizontally mounted radio, accommodating GM's standardized head units with electronic tuning in nearly all of its vehicles).

== Powertrain and Dimensions ==
The "Iron Duke" inline-4 was one of three engine options for the Citation.

For the all-new X-platform, GM introduced two new engines for the platform architecture. The Pontiac-designed 2.5L "Iron Duke" inline-4 had been introduced in 1977 for the Chevrolet Vega and the rest of the H-platform, but it underwent a series of upgrades for it to be used in a transverse-engine chassis. As an option, a Chevrolet-designed 2.8L V6 was developed as the first GM 60° V6 engine; an iron-block engine, the new engine family used a narrower 60° V-angle (for better balance and packaging, but not used for V6 engines with engineering commonality with V8s).

In 1981, Chevrolet added electronic control to its emissions systems, which reduced engine output slightly. For 1982, the 2.5L engine received fuel injection (adopted by the high-output V6 for 1985). For 1983, the 2.8L high-output V6 (previously paired with the X-11) became an option for all Citations.

Chevrolet Citation (1980-1985) powertrain details
| Engine | Design configuration | Production | Fuel system | Output | | Transmission |
| Engine | Design configuration | Production | Fuel system | Horsepower | Torque | Transmission |
|---|---|---|---|---|---|---|
| LR8 I4 (Iron Duke/Tech IV) | 151 cu in (2.5 L) OHV 8-valve I4 | 1980–1986 | 2-bbl carburetor (1980–1981) Throttle-body fuel injection (1982–1986) | 1980: 90 hp (67 kW) 1981: 84 hp (63 kW) 1982–1986: 90 hp (67 kW) | | 4-speed manual 3-speed automatic |
| LE2 V6 | 173 cu in (2.8 L) OHV 12-valve V6 | 1980–1986 | 2-bbl carburetor | 1980: 115 hp (86 kW) 1981: 110 hp (82 kW) 1982–1986: 112 hp (84 kW) | | 4-speed manual 3-speed automatic |
| LH7 V6 | 173 cu in (2.8 L) OHV 12-valve V6 | 1981–1984 | 2-bbl carburetor | 1981–1984: 135 hp (101 kW) | 1981: 165 lb⋅ft (224 N⋅m) 1982–1984: 145 lb⋅ft (197 N⋅m) | 4-speed manual 3-speed automatic |
| L44 V6 | 173 cu in (2.8 L) OHV 12-valve V6 | 1985 | Multi-point fuel injection | 130 hp (97 kW) | 155 lb⋅ft (210 N⋅m) | 4-speed manual 3-speed automatic |

Chevrolet Citation (1980-1985) Interior Dimensions
| | Front Head Room | Back Head Room | Front Leg Room | Back Leg Room | Front Hip Room | Back Hip Room | Front Shoulder Room | Back Shoulder Room | Cargo Volume Index | Luggage Capacity |
|---|---|---|---|---|---|---|---|---|---|---|
| 1980 (4-Door Hatchback) | 38.2in | 37.5in | 42in | 35.5in | 55.2in | 53.9in | 56.2in | 56.3in | 41.2ft^3 | 20.1ft^3 |
| 1980 (2-Door Hatchback) | 38.2in | 37.5in | 42in | 34.6in | 55.2in | 53.7in | 56.2in | 56.2in | 41.2ft^3 | 20.1ft^3 |
| 1980 (2-Door/Club Coupe) | 38.2in | 37.3in | 42in | 34.6in | 55.2in | 53.7in | 56.2in | 56.2in | -- | 12.5ft^3 |
| 1981 (4-Door Hatchback) | 38.1in | 37.7in | 42.2in | 35.5in | 55.1in | 55in | 56.3in | 56.3in | 41.5ft^3 | 19.7ft^3 |
| 1981 (2-Door Hatchback) | 38.1in | 37.7in | 42.2in | 34.5in | 55.1in | 54.1in | 56.2in | 56.2in | 41.4ft^3 | 19.6ft^3 |
| 1982 (4-Door Hatchback) | 38.1in | 37.7in | 42.2in | 35.5in | 55.1in | 55in | 56.3in | 56.3in | 41.5ft^3 | 19.7ft^3 |
| 1982 (2-Door Hatchback) | 38.1in | 37.7in | 42.2in | 34.5in | 55.1in | 54.1in | 56.2in | 56.2in | 41.4ft^3 | 19.6ft^3 |
| 1983 (4-Door Hatchback) | 38.1in | 37.7in | 42.2in | 35.6in | -- | -- | 55.9in | 56.3in | 35.7ft^3 | 19.6ft^3 |
| 1983 (2-Door Hatchback) | 38.1in | 37.7in | 42.2in | 34.6in | -- | -- | 56.2in | 56.2in | 35.1ft^3 | 19.6ft^3 |
| 1983 (2-Door Coupe) | 38.1in | 37.5in | 42.2in | 34.6in | -- | -- | 56.2in | 56.2in | -- | 12.5ft^3 |
| 1984 (4-Door Hatchback) | 38.1in | 37.7in | 42.2in | 35.6in | 55.1in | 55in | 56.3in | 55.9in | 35.7ft^3 | 19.6ft^3 |
| 1984 (2-Door Hatchback) | 38.1in | 37.7in | 42.2in | 34.6in | 55.1in | 53.8in | 56.2in | 56.2in | 35.1ft^3 | 19.6ft^3 |
| 1984 (2-Door Coupe) | 38.1in | 37.5in | 42.2in | 34.6in | 55.1in | 53.8in | 56.2in | 56.2in | -- | 12.5ft^3 |
| 1985 (4-Door Hatchback) | 38.1in | 37.7in | 42.2in | 35.6in | 55.1in | 55in | 55.9in | 56.3in | 36.5ft^3 | 19.4ft^3 |
| 1985 (2-Door Hatchback) | 38.1in | 37.7in | 42.2in | 34.6in | 55.1in | 53.8in | 56.2in | 56.2in | 36.3ft^3 | 19.4ft^3 |

Chevrolet Citation (1980-1985) Interior Dimensions
| | Wheelbase | Length | Width | Height | Front Tread | Rear Tread | Tank Capacity |
|---|---|---|---|---|---|---|---|
| 1980 (4-Door Hatchback) | 104.9in | 176.7in | 68.3in | 53.1in | 58.7in | 57in | -- |
| 1980 (2-Door Hatchback) | 104.9in | 176.7in | 68.3in | 53.1in | 58.7in | 57in | -- |
| 1980 (2-Door/Club Coupe) | 104.9in | 176.7in | 68.3in | 53.1in | 58.7in | 57in | -- |
| 1981 (4-Door Hatchback) | 104.9in | 176.7in | 68.3in | 53.5in | 58.7in | 57in | -- |
| 1981 (2-Door Hatchback) | 104.9in | 176.7in | 68.3in | 53.5in | 58.7in | 57in | -- |
| 1982 (4-Door Hatchback) | 104.9in | 176.7in | 68.3in | 53.5in | 58.7in | 57in | -- |
| 1982 (2-Door Hatchback) | 104.9in | 176.7in | 68.3in | 53.5in | 58.7in | 57in | -- |
| 1983 (4-Door Hatchback) | 104.9in | 176.7in | 68.3in | 53.9in | -- | -- | -- |
| 1983 (2-Door Hatchback) | 104.9in | 176.7in | 68.3in | 53.9in | -- | -- | -- |
| 1983 (2-Door Coupe) | 104.9in | 176.7in | 68.3in | 53.1in | -- | -- | -- |
| 1984 (4-Door Hatchback) | 104.9in | 176.7in | 68.3in | 53.9in | -- | -- | 14.6gal |
| 1984 (2-Door Hatchback) | 104.9in | 176.7in | 68.3in | 53.9in | -- | -- | 14.6gal |
| 1984 (2-Door Coupe) | 104.9in | 176.7in | 68.3in | 53.9in | -- | -- | 14.6gal |
| 1985 (4-Door Hatchback) | 104.9in | 176.7in | 68.3in | 53.9in | -- | -- | 14.6gal |
| 1985 (2-Door Hatchback) | 104.9in | 176.7in | 68.3in | 53.9in | -- | -- | 14.6gal |

== Citation X-11 ==
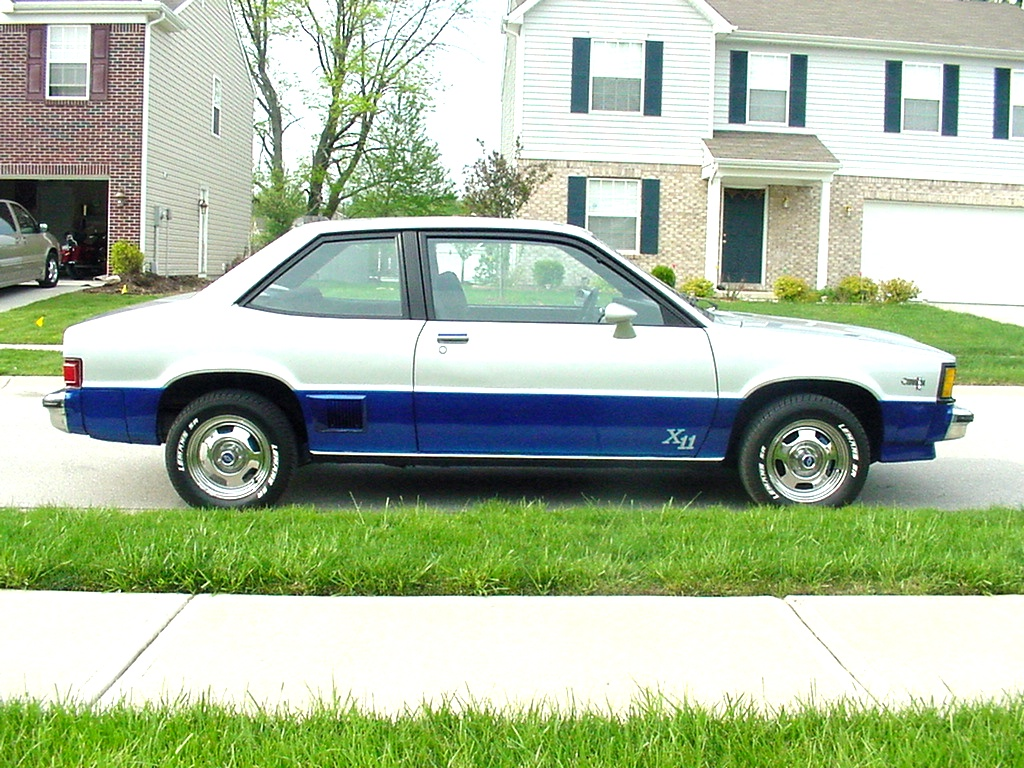
1980 Citation X-11

Produced as a separate trim level, the Citation X-11 was a variant featuring cosmetic, chassis, and powertrain upgrades over the standard Citation. While less powerful than the Camaro Z28 (and later Monte Carlo SS), the Citation X-11 would also take over the role of the similarly sized Monza. The X-11 was offered throughout the production run of the Citation/Citation II, on the 3-door hatchback and 2-door "club coupe" (discontinued in 1981 and 1985).

In 1981, the Citation X-11 accelerated from 0–60 mph in 8.5 seconds; the 1982–1984 version accelerated from 0–60 mph in 9.2 seconds.

=== Chassis upgrades ===
At its 1980 launch, the chassis of the Citation X-11 was upgraded with front and rear stabilizer bars and a retuned sport suspension, which were kept throughout its production. In place of steel wheels, the X-11 featured 13-inch rallye rims with Goodyear P205/70R-13 white-letter tires. In 1981, the 13-inch wheels were replaced with 14-inch wheels with Goodyear Eagle GT P215/60 R14 radial tires. To upgrade handling, for 1982, the steering rack was relocated from the firewall to the subframe holding the engine and front suspension. The design change was intended to prevent subframe movement from affecting steering behavior.

For 1980, the X-11 offered only handling upgrades over a Citation, with the powertrain consisting of a 90 hp 2.5 L inline-4 and a 115 hp 2.8 L V6. Alongside the standard Citation, the X-11 was available with either a 4-speed overdrive manual transmission or a 3-speed automatic transmission (the only transmission available for 1985).

To aid acceleration, axle ratios of the X-11 were changed, alongside the transmission gearing. A taller first gear was intended to allow the X-11 to accelerate to 60 mph without shifting to third gear. For 1981, the X-11 was powered exclusively by a "high-output" version of the 2.8 L V6; a higher-performance dual-tip exhaust system raised output to 135 hp/165 lb-ft of torque. As before, the X-11 maintained separate final-drive ratios. In 1982, emissions regulations required a decrease in torque output, to 145 lb-ft (horsepower remained unchanged). This output remained the same through 1984. In 1985, the carbureted engine was replaced by a fuel-injected version of the 2.8 L V6 with output decreased to 130 hp/155 lb-ft of torque. In slightly different tuning, the Citation X-11 shared its powertrain with the Chevrolet Celebrity Eurosport, Pontiac 6000STE, and Pontiac Fiero.

=== Body upgrades ===
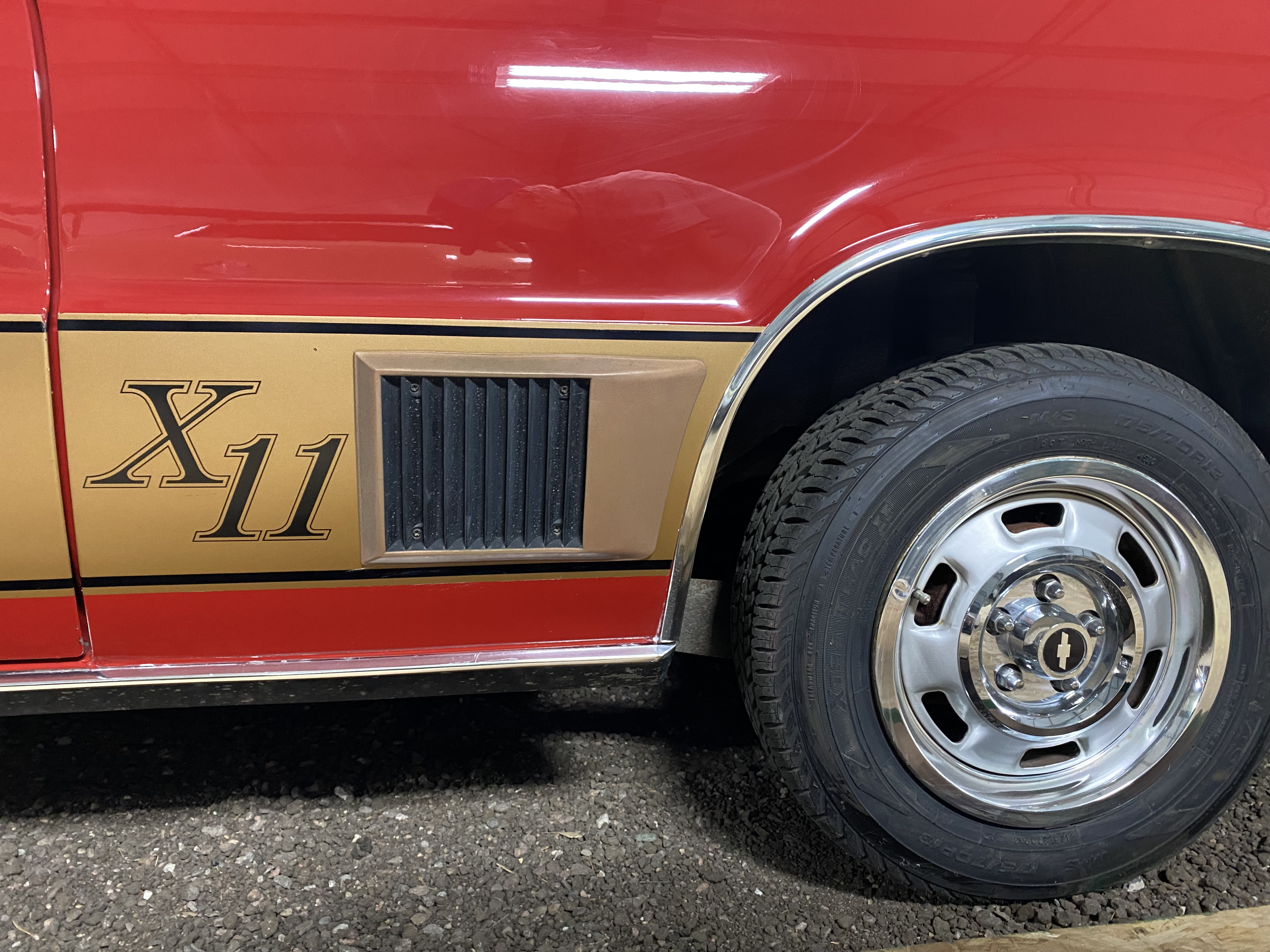
Closeup of body striping and imitation air vent on 1980 Citation X-11

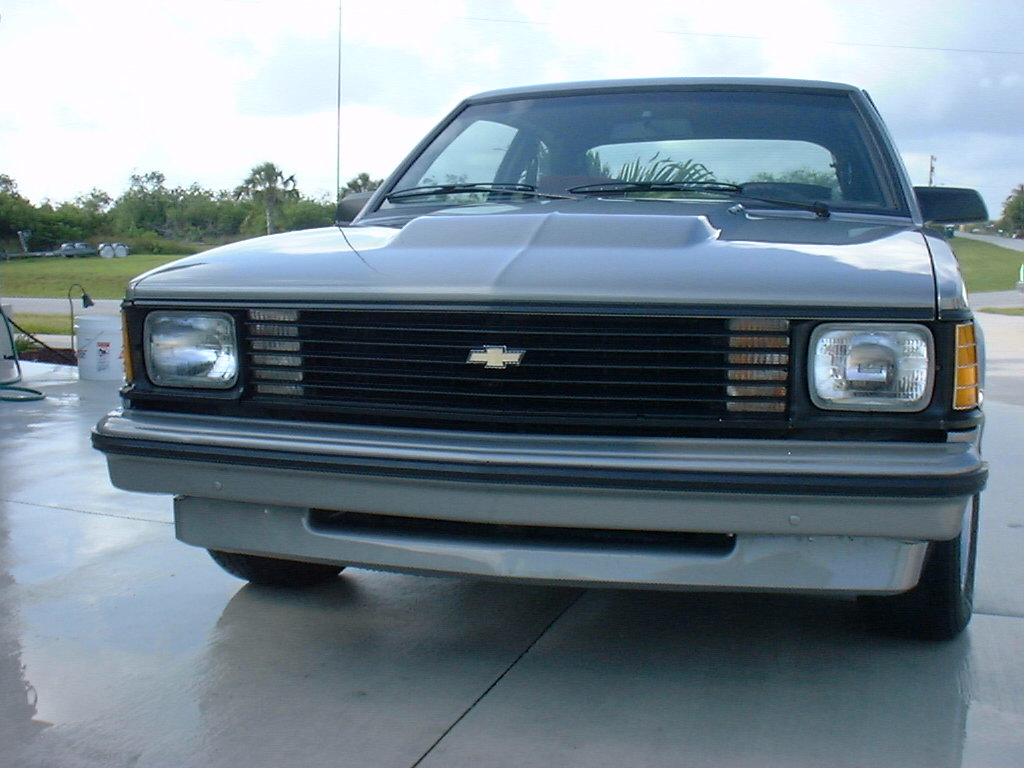
1984-1985 Citation II X-11 black grille

In 1980, the Citation X-11 shared most of its powertrain with the standard Citation, with the model being mostly a chassis and visual upgrade. Alongside the alloy wheels and tires, the X-11 featured a trunklid spoiler, sport mirrors, body skirting, and side striping. In 1981, to better distinguish the model from standard two-tone Citations, the side striping of the X-11 was replaced in favor of large "X-11" door graphic, which remained in use for the rest of its production. The model is best distinguished from a standard Citation by its use of a black grille (the only exterior chrome trim on a Citation II X-11 is the Chevrolet grille bowtie and trunklid badging). In 1981, a functional cowl-induction hood scoop was added. Under hard acceleration, a solenoid operated switch opened a flap that let in extra air.

While produced without the front bench seat seen in the launch of the Citation, the interior of the X-11 was most widely differentiated with the use of a sport steering wheel. The X-11 was produced with its own instrument panel, which featured a full set of engine gauges (6000 RPM tachometer for 1980, 7000 RPM tachometer for 1981–1985).

=== Racing ===
The SCCA classified the X-11 in Showroom Stock B class. Bob McConnell drove a 1981 X-11 to SSB National Championships in 1982 and 1984.

== Discontinuation ==
After 1.6 million units assembled of the model line, Chevrolet discontinued the Citation after the 1985 model year. The year before, GM began to wind down its use of the X platform, as it dropped the Oldsmobile Omega and Pontiac Phoenix (the slowest-selling variants), leaving only the Citation II and the Buick Skylark for 1985. After 23 years and five generations, GM retired the X platform entirely for its compact cars after 1985.

GM would not offer a direct replacement for the X platform, as its compact models were split among two different platforms phased in between 1985 and 1988. Buick, Oldsmobile, and Pontiac used the split-wheelbase N platform (designed by Oldsmobile); the Chevrolet-designed L platform replaced the Citation with the Corsica and Beretta. Though designed separately, L-body and N-body cars shared engineering commonality with the smaller J-body chassis.

Though the 1980 launch of the Citation has not been replicated again (in terms of sales), the replacement compact cars proved successful in the marketplace, as the Pontiac Grand Am became the best-selling vehicle of the brand, with the Corsica/Beretta becoming one of the highest-selling vehicles in the United States at its launch.

== Reception ==
The Citation was awarded Motor Trend Car of the Year for 1980. In 2009, the editorial staff of Car and Driver criticized the 1980 Motor Trend decision (alongside several other vehicle awards), citing poor build quality and mechanical reliability undeserving of such an award in hindsight.

Car and Driver, along with several other car magazines of the time, were duped when GM lent them specially modified versions of the X-body vehicles in which heavy torque steer had been engineered out (torque steer was a handling trait common to X-platform vehicles). Patrick Bedard of Car and Driver said that they were completely surprised by this when they drove a production version some time later. Like the other X-body cars, there were numerous reports of the Citation locking the rear wheels upon braking, causing loss of control and a crash.

Hagerty, an insurance company specializing in classic cars, notes that the X-car was "GM's prime contender for one of the malaziest [sic] cars" of the Malaise era, a car that did "enormous damage to GM's reputation, putting together a most unenviable record for recalls and poor quality control."

=== Safety recalls ===
Through its production, as one of the front-wheel drive X-body vehicles, the Citation would undergo a number of manufacturer recalls. In 1980, 225,000 examples were recalled to fix a transmission hose related to underhood fires. The X-body cars (which included the Citation) were the target of an unsuccessful lawsuit by the U.S. National Highway Traffic Safety Administration (NHTSA), which cited a tendency for the vehicles to lose control under heavy braking, and power steering problems.

== Sales ==
Chevrolet Citation production figures
| | Coupe | 3 door hatch | 5 door hatch | Yearly total |
|---|---|---|---|---|
| 1980 | 143,249 | 210,258 | 458,033 | 811,540 |
| 1981 | — | 113,983 | 299,396 | 413,379 |
| 1982 | 9,102 | 29,613 | 126,932 | 165,647 |
| 1983 | 6,456 | 14,323 | 71,405 | 92,184 |
| 1984 | 4,936 | 8,783 | 83,486 | 97,205 |
| 1985 | — | 7,443 | 55,279 | 62,722 |
| Total | 163,743 | 384,403 | 1,094,531 | 1,642,677 |
