= Chevrolet Celebrity =

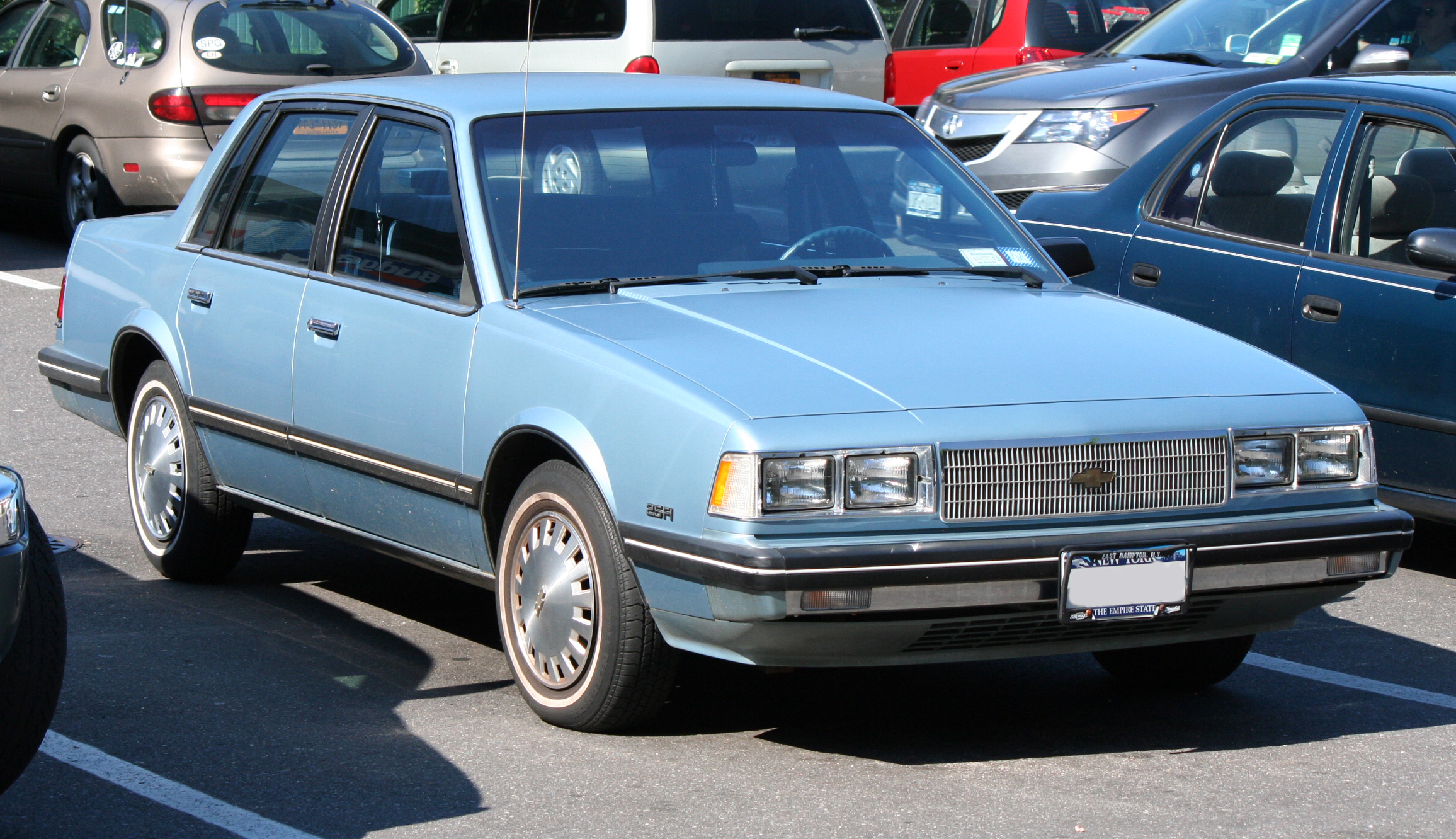
- 1986 Chevrolet Celebrity 4-door sedan

Overview
- Manufacturer: Chevrolet (General Motors)
- Production: 1981–1990
- Model years: 1982–1990
- Assembly: Canada: Oshawa, Ontario (Oshawa Car Assembly: 1982–1987); Sainte-Thérèse, Quebec (Sainte-Thérèse Assembly: 1987–1990); Colombia: Bogotá, Distrito Capital (Bogotá Assembly); Mexico: Ramos Arizpe (Ramos Arizpe Assembly: 1982–1989; 1987–1989, export); United States: Framingham, Massachusetts (Framingham Assembly: 1982–1988); Fremont, California (Fremont Assembly: 1982); Oklahoma City, Oklahoma (Oklahoma City Assembly: 1983–1989); Venezuela: Valencia, Carabobo (Valencia Assembly)

Body and chassis
- Class: Mid-size
- Body style: 2-door coupe 4-door sedan 4-door station wagon
- Layout: Transverse front-engine, front-wheel drive
- Platform: A-body
- Related: Buick Century (fifth generation); Oldsmobile Cutlass Ciera; Pontiac 6000

Powertrain
- Engine: gasoline: 2.5 L LR8 I4; 2.8 L LE2/LH7/L44/LB6 V6; 3.1 L LH0 V6; diesel: 4.3 L LT7 V6
- Transmission: 3-speed 3T40 automatic 4-speed 4T60 automatic 5-speed Getrag manual

Dimensions
- Wheelbase: 104.8 in (2,662 mm)
- Length: Coupe & Sedan: 188.3 in (4,783 mm); Wagon: 190.8 in (4,846 mm)
- Width: Coupe & Sedan: 69.2 in (1,758 mm); Wagon: 69.3 in (1,760 mm)
- Height: Coupe & Sedan: 54.2 in (1,377 mm); Wagon: 54.3 in (1,379 mm)

Chronology
- Predecessor: Chevrolet Malibu
- Successor: Chevrolet Lumina; Chevrolet Lumina APV (station wagon)

The Chevrolet Celebrity is a mid-size car that was sold by Chevrolet from the 1982 to 1990 model years. Taking its name from the four-door sedan version of the early 1960s Oldsmobile 88, the Celebrity transitioned the midsize Chevrolet range to front-wheel drive. Replacing the Chevrolet Malibu, the Chevrolet was initially marketed between the Citation and the Impala within the Chevrolet model line (later the Corsica and Caprice).

For its single generation, the front-wheel drive Celebrity used the GM A platform. An evolution of the GM X platform used by the Citation, the architecture supported two-door notchback coupe, four-door sedan, and five-door station wagon body styles. The Citation shared the A platform with the Buick Century, Oldsmobile Cutlass Ciera, and Pontiac 6000.

During its production, the Celebrity was produced in multiple facilities through the United States, Canada, and Mexico. After 1989, the Celebrity sedan was replaced by the larger Chevrolet Lumina. The Celebrity station wagon was discontinued after 1990, with the Chevrolet Lumina APV minivan serving as its replacement.

== Model overview ==
Introduced in January 1982, the Chevrolet Celebrity was offered in two-door and four-door notchback sedan body styles. For the 1984 model year, the five-door station wagon was added to the model line. While not as extensive of a downsizing as the 1977 Impala/Caprice, the 1978 Malibu, or the 1980 Citation, the 1982 Celebrity lost approximately 4 inches in length and 2 inches of width over the Malibu.

=== Chassis ===
The Celebrity is based on the GM A-body platform, introduced for 1982. The successor to the rear-wheel drive A-body intermediate chassis (renamed as the G-body), the A platform was the first mass-market American mid-size architecture to adopt front-wheel drive (followed by Chrysler in 1983 and Ford in 1986). To maximize development and production efficiency, the chassis was a derivative of the compact GM X platform, with the Celebrity sharing its 104.9 wheelbase with the Chevrolet Citation.

Though derived from the X-body chassis, the A-body platform would not share entirely in its controversial recall issues. There were drivability problems with the computerized engine control system in 1982 models, and deterioration of the upper engine mount (also called a dogbone) caused engine/transaxle vibration.

==== Powertrain ====
For its 1982 launch, the Celebrity was offered with three engines. A 90 hp (67 kW) 2.5 L inline-4 was standard, with an optional 112 hp (84 kW) 2.8 L V6; an 85 hp (63 kW) 4.3 L diesel V6 (effectively, 3/4 of the Oldsmobile diesel V8) was also offered as an option. All three engines were paired with a three-speed automatic transmission.

For 1984, the standard 2.5 L engine was retuned to 92 hp (69 kW), with the 130 hp (97 kW) 2.8 L H.O. V6 (from the Citation X-11) becoming an option. A four-speed manual was offered with both the 2.5 L I4 and the H.O. V6; a four-speed automatic (with overdrive) was optional with either 2.8 L engine.

For 1985, the 130 hp (97 kW) 2.8 L H.O. V6 switched from a 2-barrel carburetor to multiport fuel injection. In a revision, the H.O. V6 was no longer offered with a manual transmission, but the 4-speed automatic remained for both V6 engines.

For 1986, the 4.3 L diesel V6 was dropped, with the H.O. V6 retuned to 125 hp (93 kW). The three-speed automatic remained, paired only with the 2.5 L engine.

For 1987, the powertrain line underwent several revisions. The carbureted 2.8 L engine was dropped, leaving the 2.5 L I4, retuned to 98 hp (73 kW), and fuel-injected 2.8 L V6, retuned to 135 hp (101 kW). Both engines were fitted with a three-speed automatic as standard equipment; the 2.8 L V6 was offered with an optional four-speed automatic or five-speed manual transmission.

For 1988, the 98 hp (73 kW) 2.5 L engine was fitted with balance shafts, with the 2.8 L V6 retuned to 125 hp (93 kW).

For 1989, the five-speed manual transmission was dropped. As a running change, the 2.5 L engine was retuned to 110 hp (82 kW).

For 1990 (station wagons only), the 2.8 L engine was replaced by a 135 hp (101 kW) 3.1 L V6.

Years	Name	Power	Torque	Displacement	Bore	Stroke	Compression Ratio	Fuel System	Valvetrain
1982	LR8 I4	90 hp (67 kW) at 4,000 rpm	132 lb⋅ft (179 N⋅m) at 2,800 rpm	2.5 L (151 cu in)	4.000 in (101.6 mm)	3.000 in (76.2 mm)	8.3:1	TBI	OHV
1983	LR8 I4	92 hp (69 kW) at 4,000 rpm	134 lb⋅ft (182 N⋅m) at 2,800 rpm	2.5 L (151 cu in)	4.000 in (101.6 mm)	3.000 in (76.2 mm)	8.2:1	EFI	OHV
1984	LR8 I4	92 hp (69 kW) at 4,000 rpm	134 lb⋅ft (182 N⋅m) at 2,800 rpm	2.5 L (151 cu in)	4.000 in (101.6 mm)	3.000 in (76.2 mm)	9.0:1	EFI	OHV
1985–1986	LR8 I4	92 hp (69 kW) at 4,400 rpm	134 lb⋅ft (182 N⋅m) at 2,800 rpm	2.5 L (151 cu in)	4.000 in (101.6 mm)	3.000 in (76.2 mm)	9.0:1	EFI	OHV
1987–1989	LR8 I4	98 hp (73 kW) at 4,800 rpm	135 lb⋅ft (183 N⋅m) at 3,200 rpm	2.5 L (151 cu in)	4.000 in (101.6 mm)	3.000 in (76.2 mm)	8.3:1	EFI	OHV
1990	LR8 I4	110 hp (82 kW) at 5,200 rpm	135 lb⋅ft (183 N⋅m) at 3,200 rpm	2.5 L (151 cu in)	4.000 in (101.6 mm)	3.000 in (76.2 mm)	8.3:1	TBI	OHV
1982–1983	LE2 V6	112 hp (84 kW) at 4,000 rpm	145 lb⋅ft (197 N⋅m) at 2,800 rpm	2.8 L (173 cu in)	3.500 in (88.9 mm)	2.990 in (75.9 mm)	8.5:1	2bbl	OHV
1984–1985	LE2 V6	112 hp (84 kW) at 4,800 rpm	145 lb⋅ft (197 N⋅m) at 2,100 rpm	2.8 L (173 cu in)	3.500 in (88.9 mm)	2.990 in (75.9 mm)	8.5:1	2bbl	OHV
1986	LE2 V6	112 hp (84 kW) at 4,800 rpm	145 lb⋅ft (197 N⋅m) at 2,100 rpm	2.8 L (173 cu in)	3.500 in (88.9 mm)	2.990 in (75.9 mm)	8.0:1	2bbl	OHV
1984	LH7 V6	130 hp (97 kW) at 5,400 rpm	145 lb⋅ft (197 N⋅m) at 2,400 rpm	2.8 L (173 cu in)	3.500 in (88.9 mm)	2.990 in (75.9 mm)	8.9:1	2bbl	OHV
1985	LB6 V6	130 hp (97 kW) at 4,800 rpm	155 lb⋅ft (210 N⋅m) at 3,600 rpm	2.8 L (173 cu in)	3.500 in (88.9 mm)	2.990 in (75.9 mm)	8.9:1	MPFI	OHV
1986	LB6 V6	125 hp (93 kW) at 4,800 rpm	160 lb⋅ft (220 N⋅m) at 3,600 rpm	2.8 L (173 cu in)	3.500 in (88.9 mm)	2.990 in (75.9 mm)	8.5:1	MPFI	OHV
1987–1989	LB6 V6	125 hp (93 kW) at 4,500 rpm	160 lb⋅ft (220 N⋅m) at 3,600 rpm	2.8 L (173 cu in)	3.500 in (88.9 mm)	2.990 in (75.9 mm)	8.9:1	MPFI	OHV
1990	LH0 V6	135 hp (101 kW) at 4,400 rpm	180 lb⋅ft (240 N⋅m) at 3,600 rpm	3.1 L (191 cu in)	3.500 in (88.9 mm)	3.310 in (84.1 mm)	8.8:1	MPFI	OHV
1983–1985	LT7 Diesel V6	85 hp (63 kW) at 3,600 rpm	165 lb⋅ft (224 N⋅m) at 1,600 rpm	4.3 L (262 cu in)	4.057 in (103.0 mm)	3.385 in (86.0 mm)	22.8:1	Diesel	OHV

=== Body ===
The Celebrity shares its roofline with the 1982–1988 Pontiac 6000, Oldsmobile Cutlass Ciera and Buick Century and is distinguished from other A-platform vehicles by its coved rear fascia. For 1984, Chevrolet introduced a five-door Celebrity station wagon with a liftgate and hatchback rear window. For the first time since 1977, a mid-size Chevrolet station wagon was available with a third-row seat.

Soon after its introduction, the Celebrity and its A-body counterparts became widely known as one of the most transparent examples of corporate product rebadging in the American automotive industry. The four model lines were highlighted on the August 22, 1983 cover of Fortune as examples of genericized uniformity. Hemmings Motor News would later cover the effect of the Fortune article, relating "how a single magazine cover photo changed the course of auto design at GM in the Eighties." Embarrassed by the incident, GM subsequently recommitted to development of divisional brand identity.

Throughout its production, Chevrolet introduced few updates to the model line, with minor exterior updates in 1984, 1986, and 1987. For 1987, the hoodline was lowered slightly, distinguished by the introduction of composite headlamp lenses and a smaller grille design. In 1986, the rear fascia was revised, adding wraparound taillamp lenses and a center-mount brake lamp (CHMSL). To comply with passive-restraint regulations, the model line received door-mounted seatbelts for 1990 (in place of airbags).

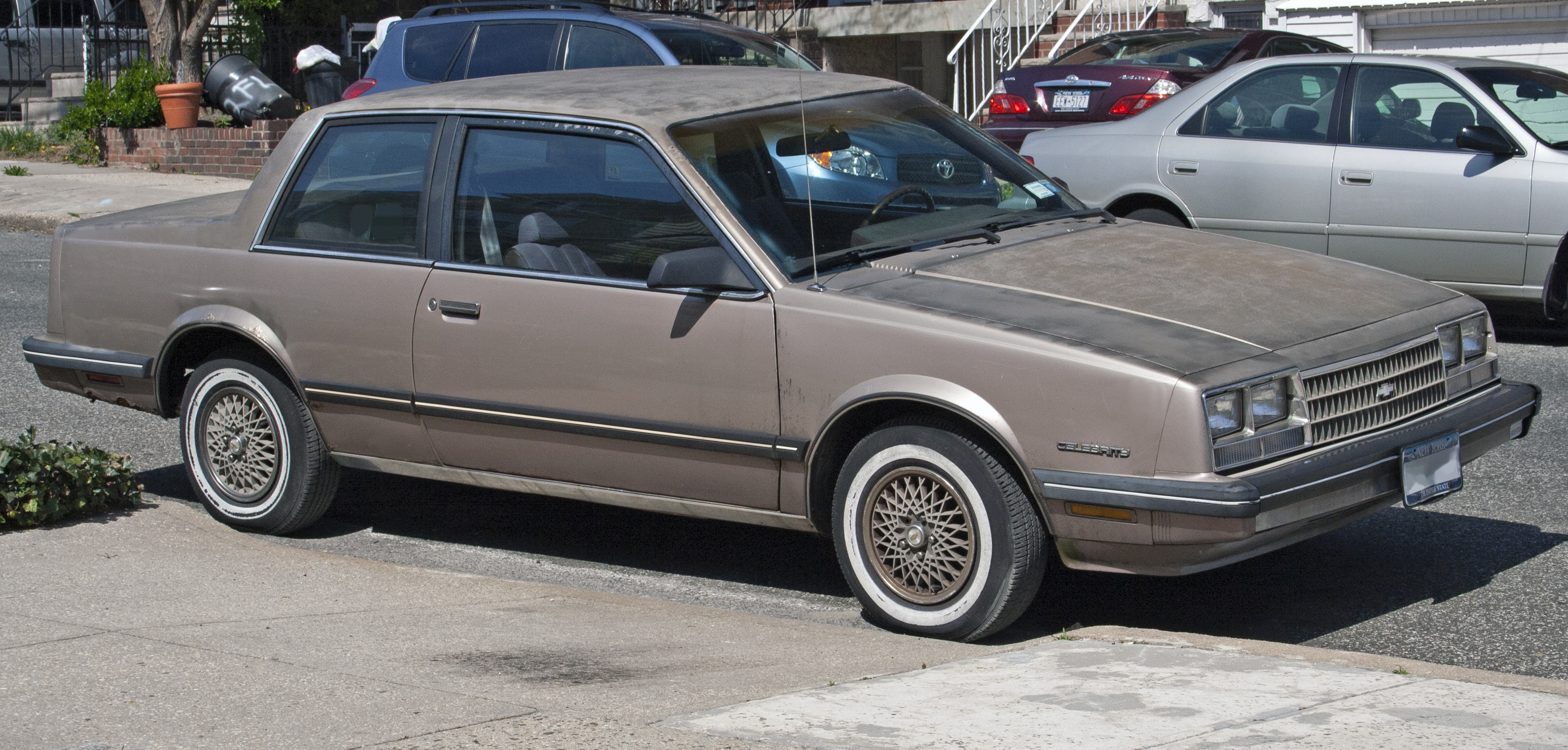
1984 Chevrolet Celebrity 2-door

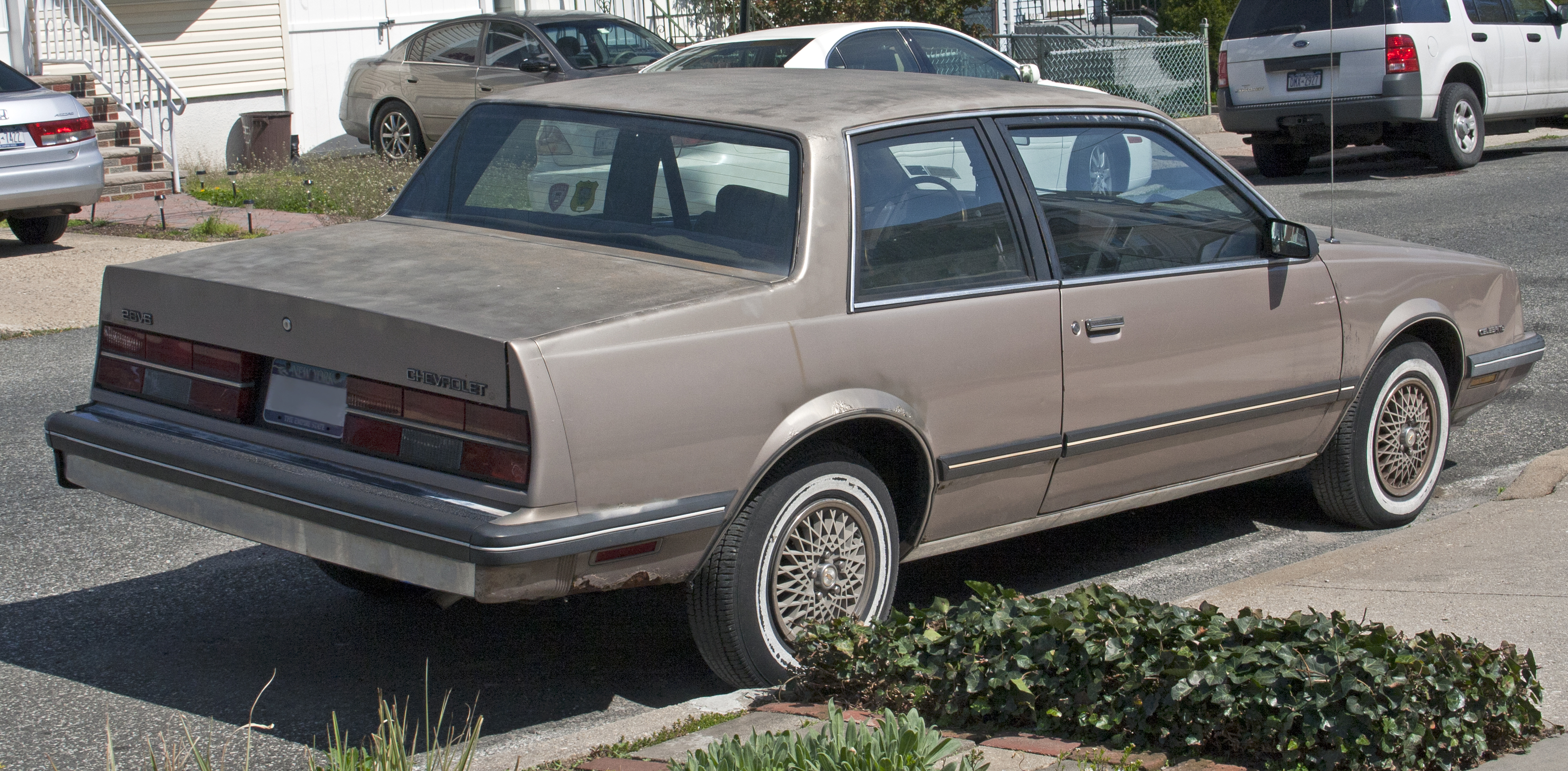
1984 Chevrolet Celebrity 2-door rear

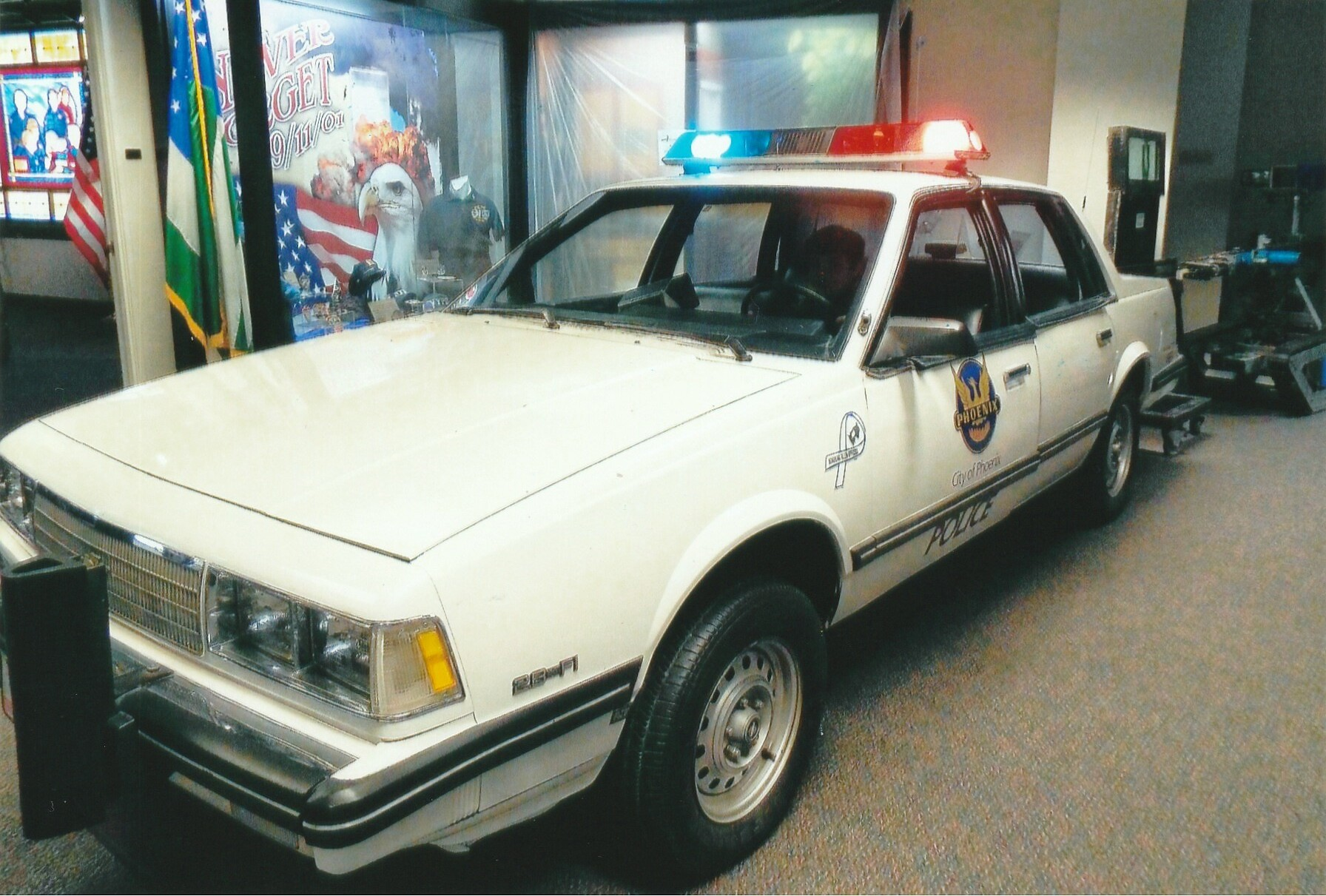
1986 Chevrolet Celebrity 4-door sedan in police cruiser configuration, on display at the Phoenix Police Museum

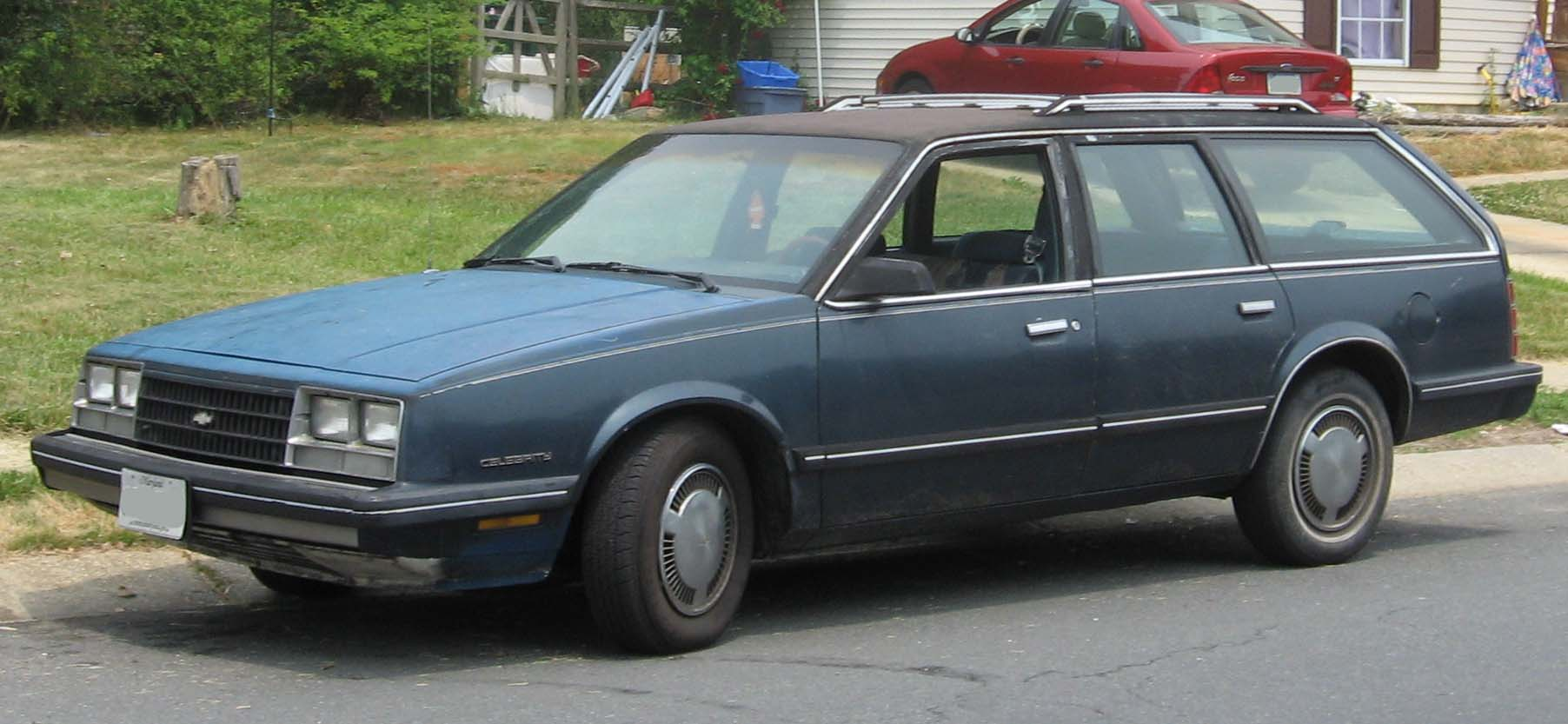
1984–1985 Celebrity station wagon

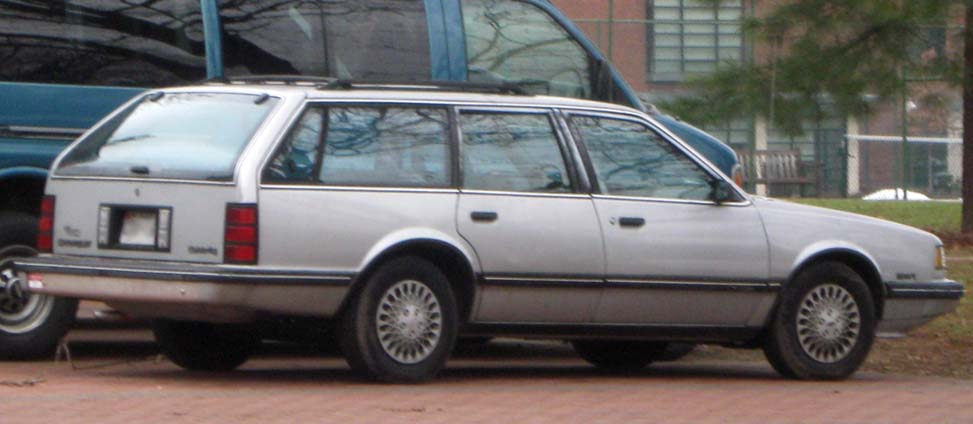
1987–1990 Chevrolet Celebrity station wagon, rear view

=== Trim ===
During its nine-year run, the Celebrity was available with various trim/option packages including CS, CL, Estate (which added exterior simulated woodgrain applique on wagons), Eurosport, and Eurosport VR.

==== Celebrity Eurosport ====
One of the most notable versions of the Chevrolet Celebrity is the Celebrity Eurosport. Introduced in 1984 as an option package, the Eurosport is both a cosmetic and performance option package for the Chevrolet Celebrity. Distinguished by its black window trim and red emblems, the Eurosport was offered with the 2.8 L H.O. V6 from the Citation X-11 as an option (along with any Celebrity powertrain). Other parts of the Eurosport package include a heavy-duty F41 suspension, black steering wheel and 14" Sport Rallye wheels (which became an option for all Celebrity sedans/wagons). The interior was given model-specific red emblems on the door panels and dashboard.

For the 1988 model year, the Olympic Eurosport edition was offered in Canada as a tie-in to the Calgary Winter Olympics. Offered only in monochrome white, with all blackout trim exterior painted white to match the body. The only interior colour trim was saddle, with an Olympic logo mounted on the B pillar.

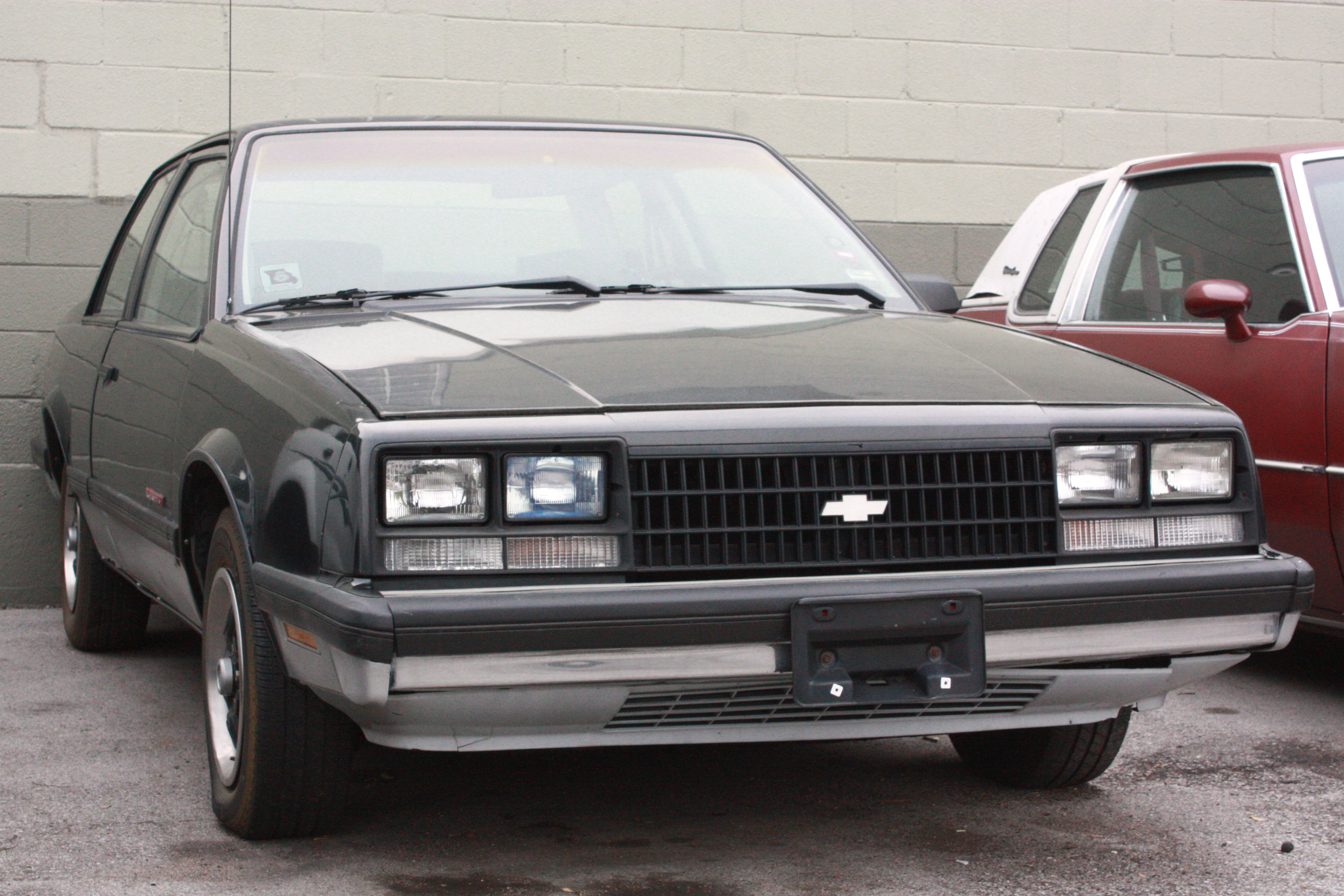
1984–1985 Chevrolet Eurosport two-door

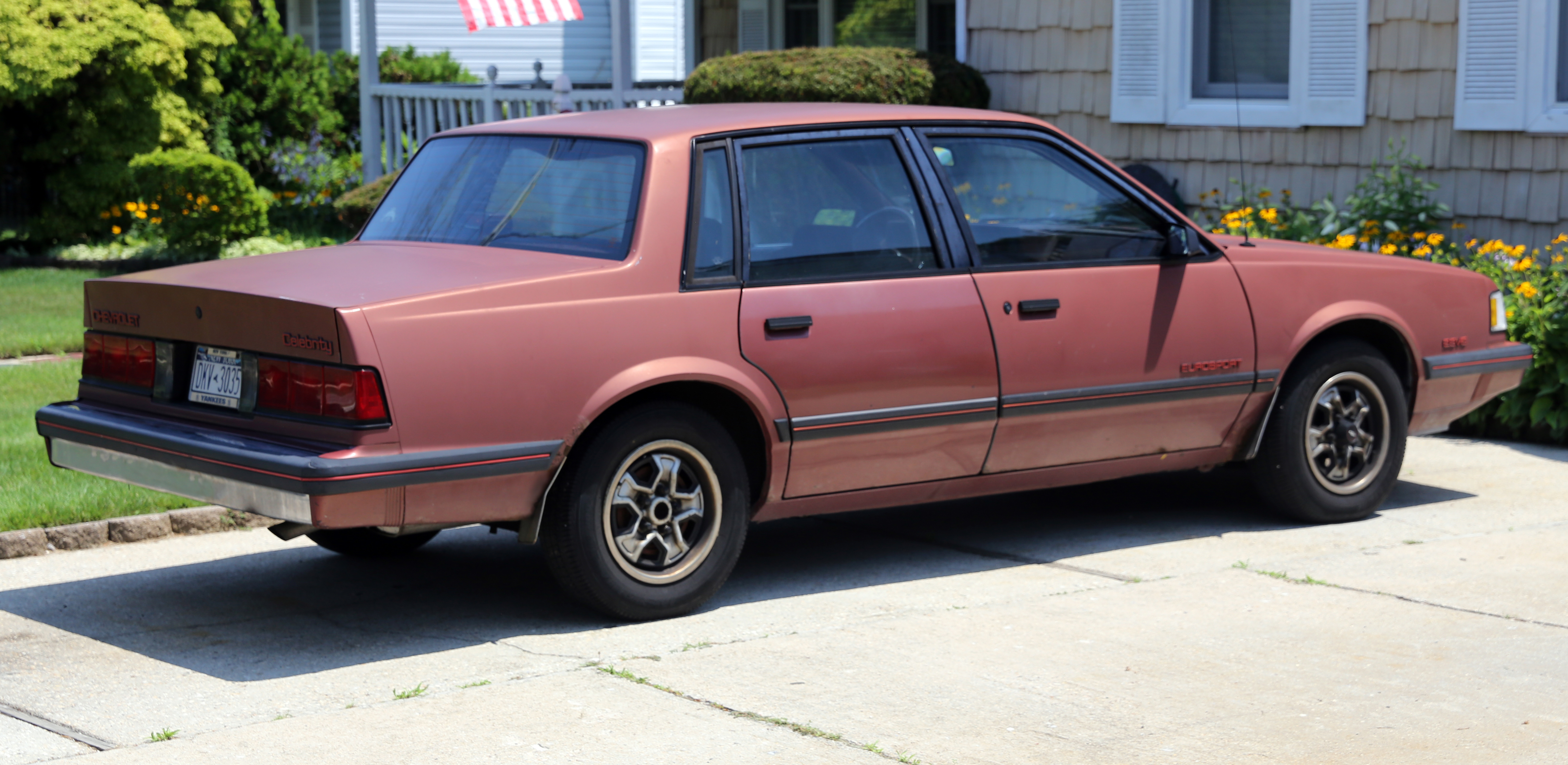
1986 Chevrolet Celebrity Eurosport, rear

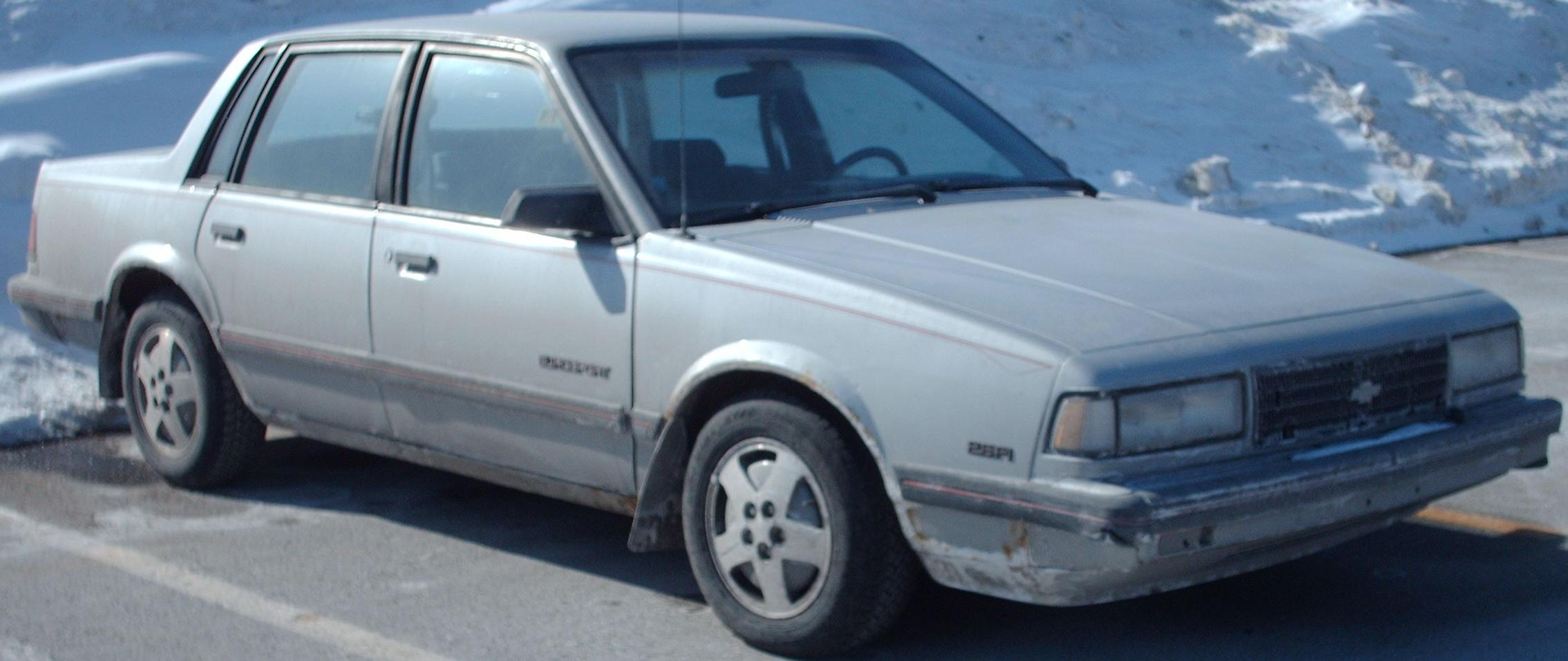
1987–1989 Chevrolet Celebrity Eurosport

==== Celebrity Eurosport VR ====
Based on the 1986 Chevrolet Eurosport RS concept car, Chevrolet offered the Celebrity Eurosport VR limited edition option package for 1987 and 1988. Converted by Autostyle Cars, near Oklahoma City Assembly, the Eurosport VR was fitted with ground effects, body decals, a blacked-out grille, and aluminum wheels. The Eurosport VR was produced in only four colors: red, silver, black, and white.

For 1987, the VR was offered for the four-door sedan and station wagon and are distinguished by their interior, which includes red carpeting, special tri-color door panels, bucket seats with thigh bolsters, and a rear seat cup holder. For 1988, two-door versions were produced as well and were produced with interiors from a standard Celebrity or Celebrity CL.

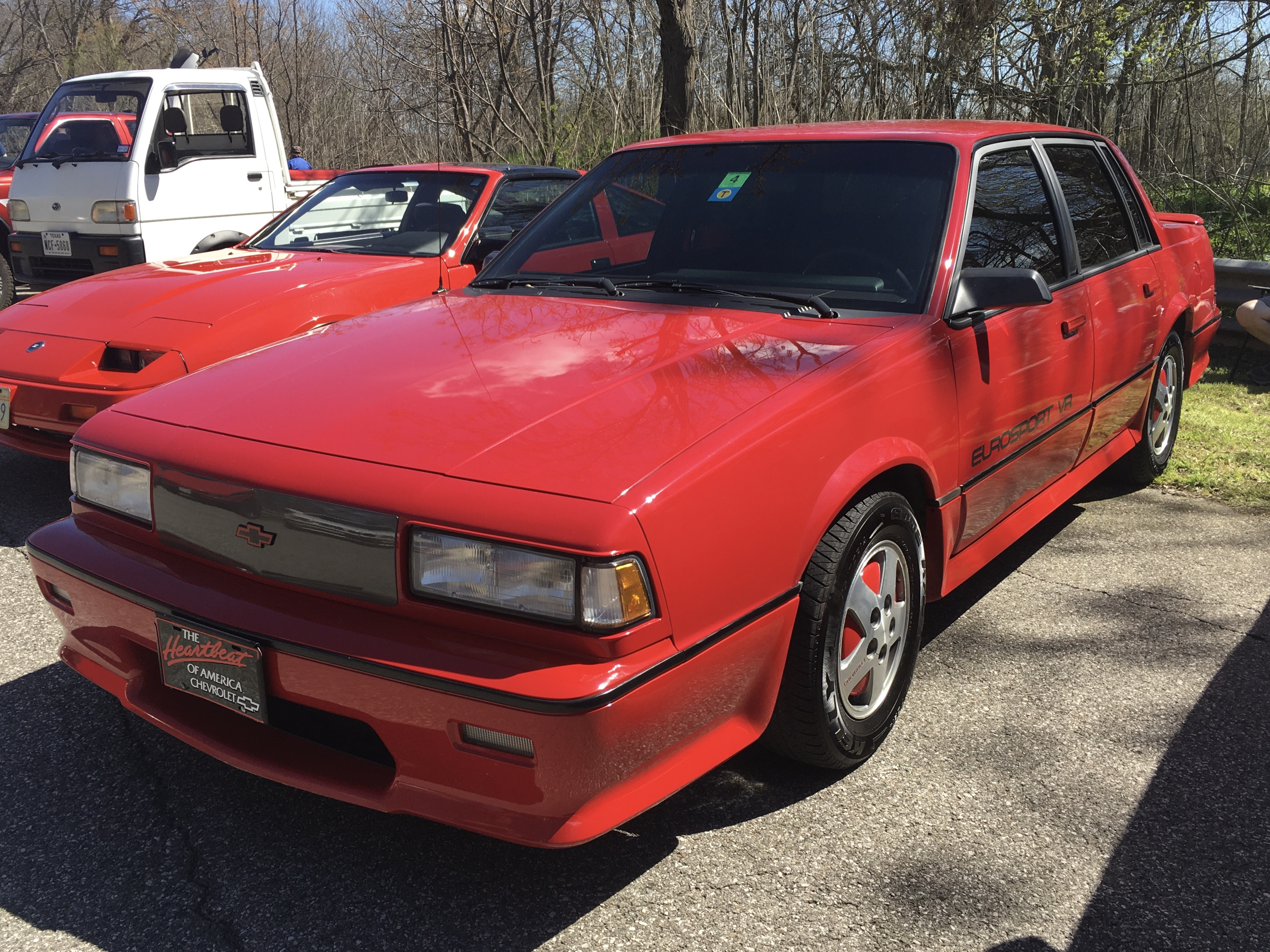
Chevrolet Celebrity Eurosport VR

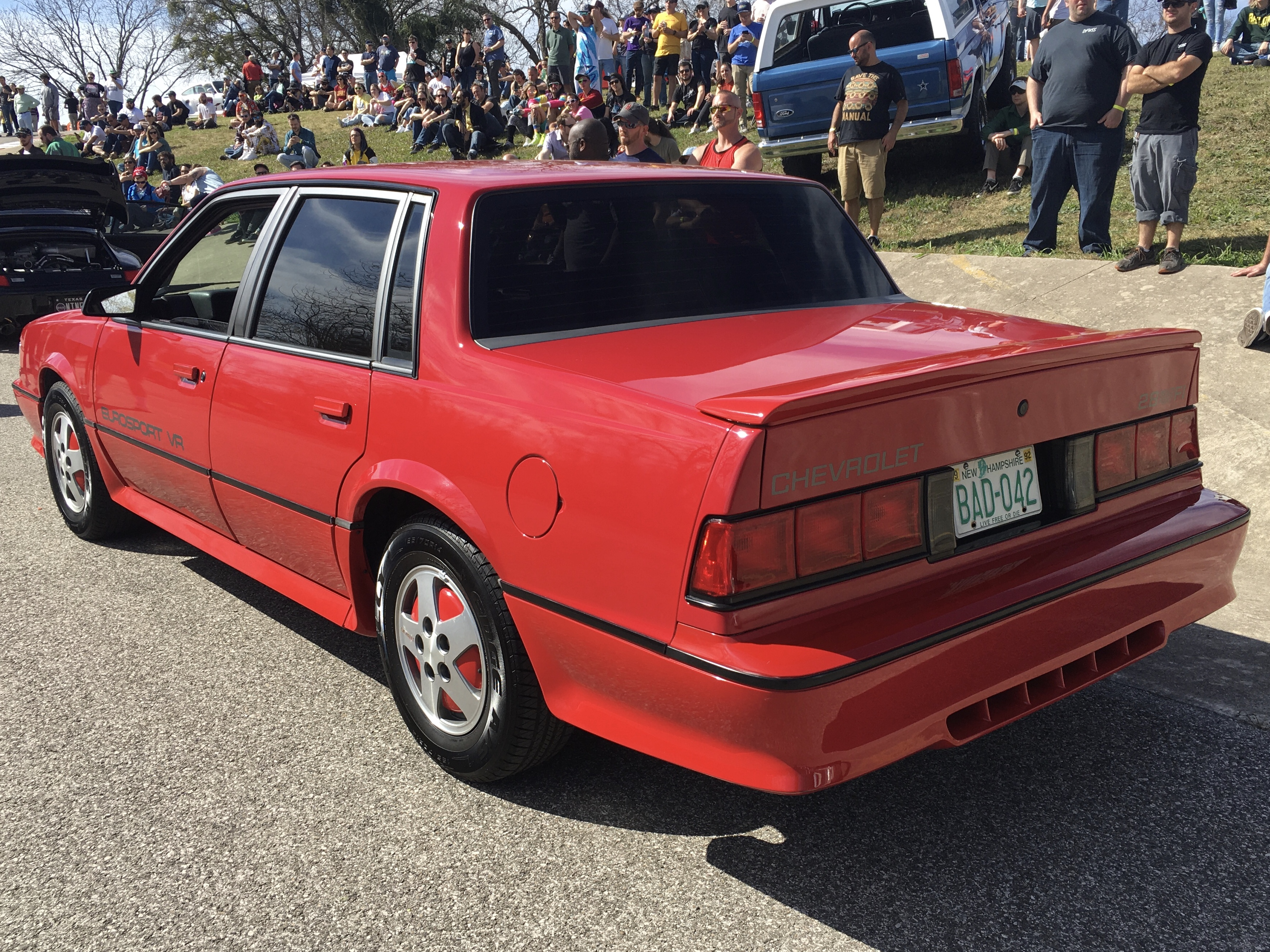
Chevrolet Celebrity Eurosport VR rear view

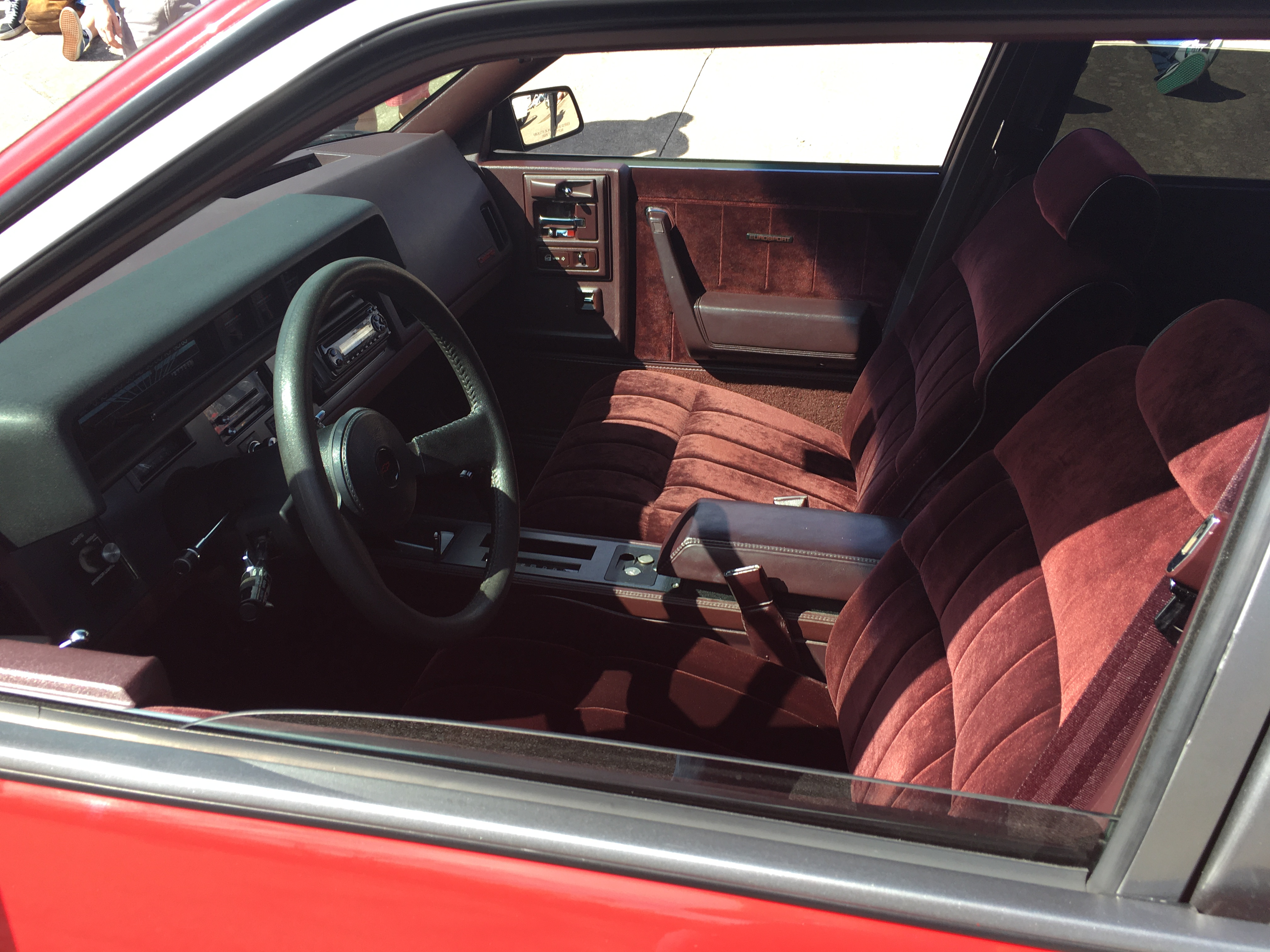
interior view, Chevrolet Celebrity Eurosport VR

=== Discontinuation ===
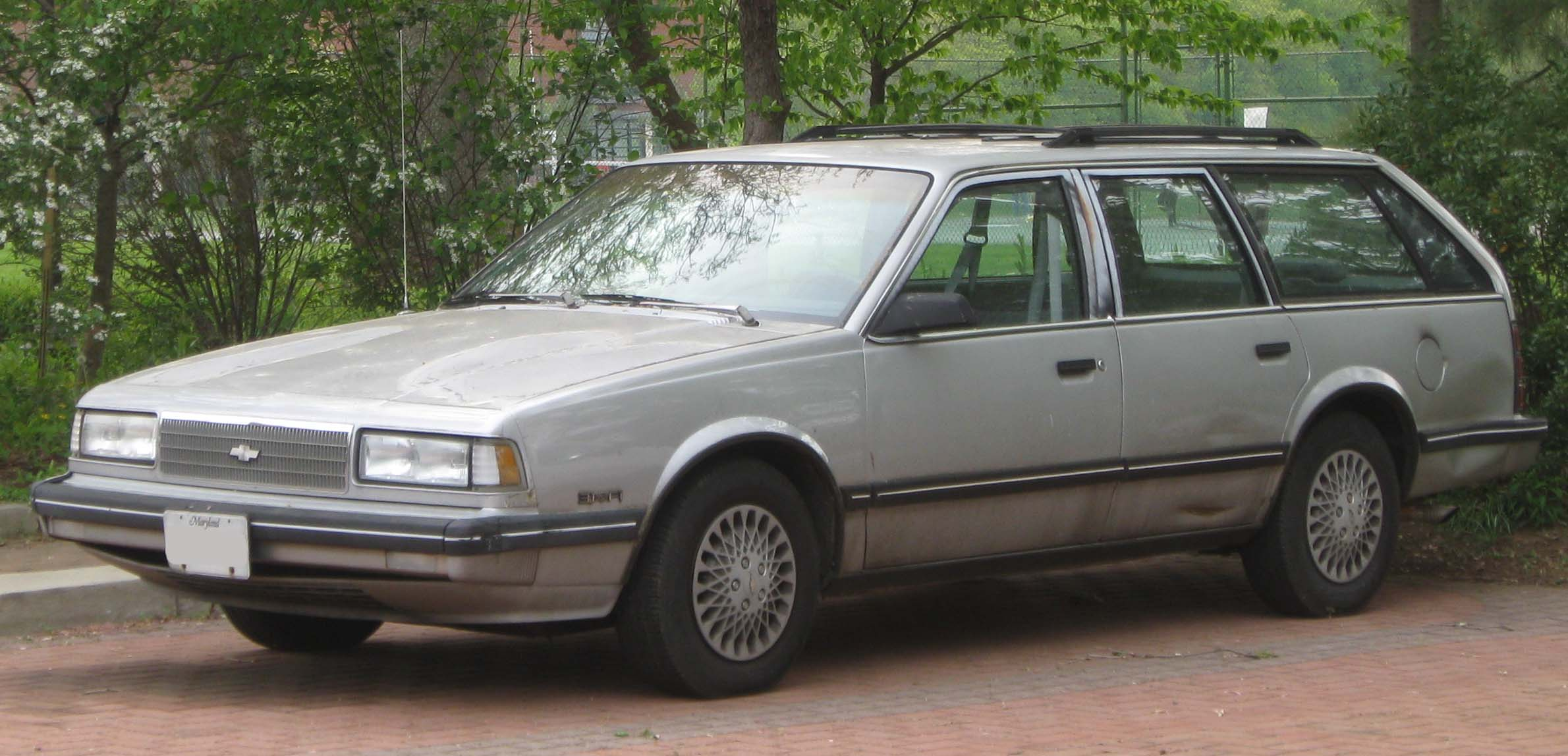
1990 Chevrolet Celebrity station wagon

Following the 1987 model year, General Motors ended regular updates to the Celebrity, concentrating on development of the Chevrolet Lumina. Coinciding with declining sales of sedan-based coupes, the two-door Celebrity was dropped after the 1988 model year. Outliving the two-door Caprice by a year, the two-door Celebrity gave way to the Chevrolet Beretta and the two-door Chevrolet Lumina (the latter intended as the successor to the Monte Carlo).

After 1989, Chevrolet discontinued the Celebrity sedan (marketing it alongside the 1990 Lumina), offering only the station wagon for 1990. As consumer demand for family vehicles shifted from station wagons to minivans, the Lumina APV served as the functional replacement for the Celebrity wagon. As of 2025, it was the last mid-sized Chevrolet station wagon.

The Pontiac 6000 was discontinued after 1991, with the Buick Century and Oldsmobile Cutlass Ciera continuing in production nearly unchanged until the end of the 1996 model year.

== Production ==
During the 1980s, within Chevrolet, the Celebrity competed with the Cavalier as the highest-selling car of the brand. Along with becoming the highest-selling Chevrolet car for 1986 and 1987, the Celebrity would be the highest-selling car in the United States for 1986. As of current production, this remains the last time a Chevrolet vehicle (or any GM-brand vehicle) has done so.

Chevrolet Celebrity Production Figures
	Coupe	Sedan	Wagon	Yearly Total
1982	19,629	72,701	-	92,330
1983	19,221	120,608	-	139,829
1984	29,191	200,259	79,838	309,288
1985	29,010	239,763	86,149	354,922
1986	29,223	291,760	83,900	404,883
1987	18,198	273,864	70,462	362,524
1988	11,909	195,205	51,342	258,456
1989	-	162,482	39,179	201,661
1990	-	-	29,205	29,205
Total	156,381	1,556,642	440,075	2,153,098
