= Pontiac Firebird =

American pony car

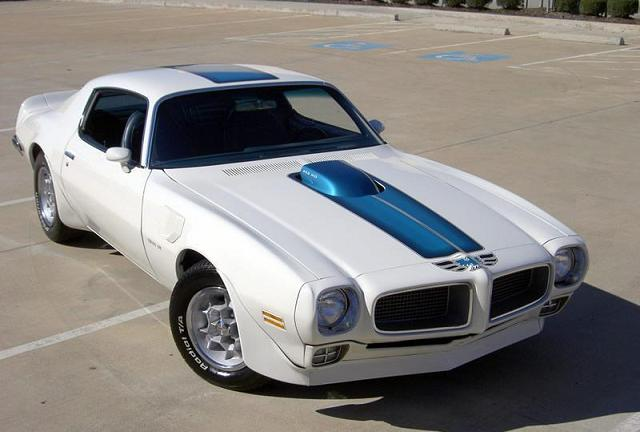
- 1970 Firebird Trans Am

Overview
- Manufacturer: Pontiac (General Motors)
- Production: February 23, 1967 – August 30, 2002
- Model years: 1967–2002

Body and chassis
- Class: Pony car Muscle car
- Layout: Front engine, rear-wheel-drive
- Platform: F-body
- Related: Chevrolet Camaro

The Pontiac Firebird is an American automobile built and produced by Pontiac from the 1967 to 2002 model years. Designed as a pony car to compete with the Ford Mustang, it was introduced on February 23, 1967, five months after GM's Chevrolet division's platform-sharing Camaro. This also coincided with the release of the 1967 Mercury Cougar, Ford's upscale, platform-sharing version of the Mustang. The name "Firebird" was also previously used by GM for the General Motors Firebird series of concept cars in the 1950s.

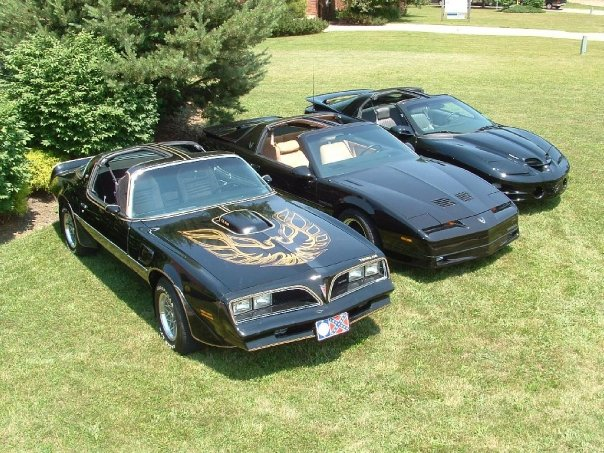
Second, third, and fourth generation Firebird Trans Ams

== First generation (1967–1969) ==
First generation
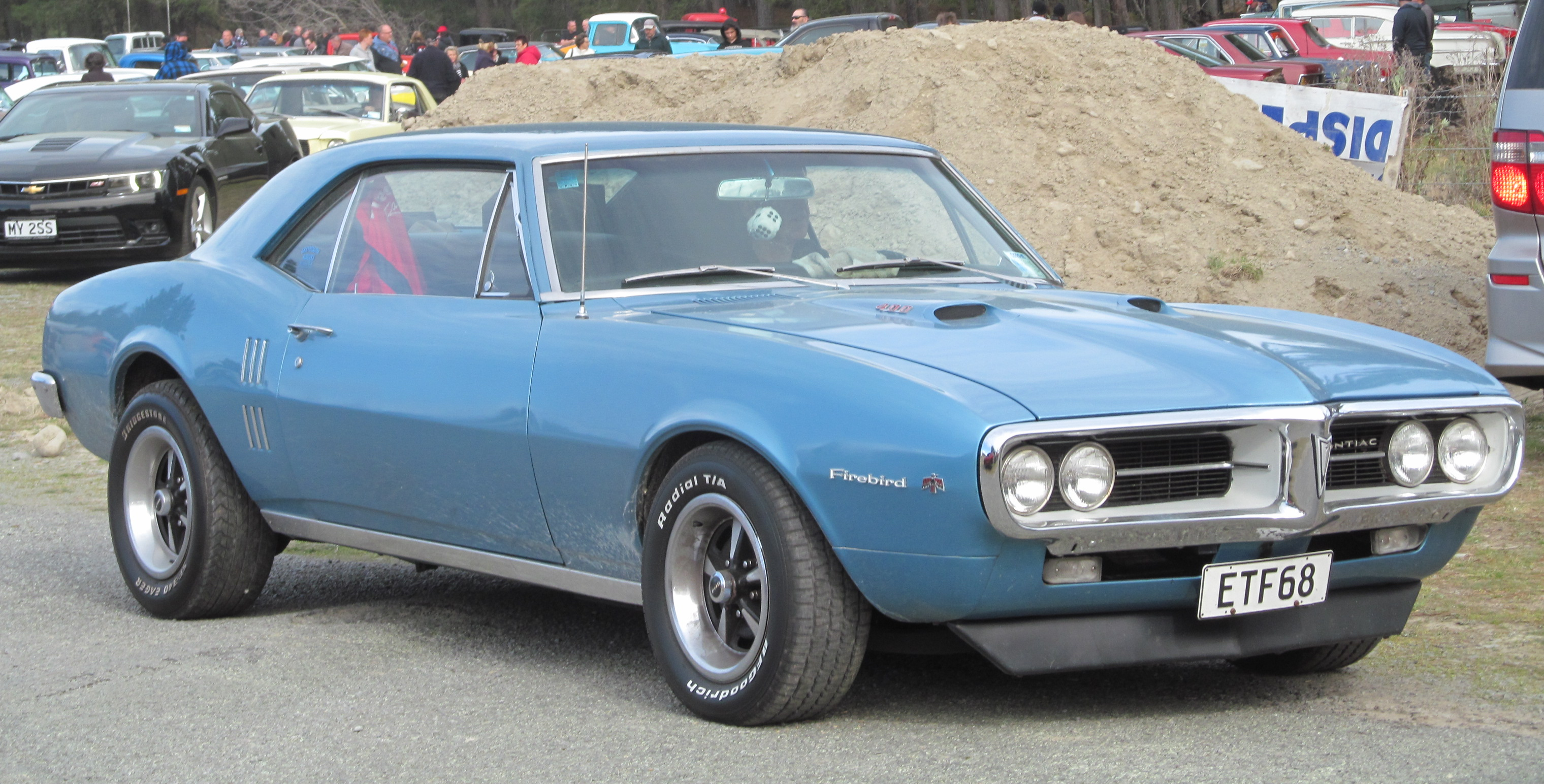
- 1967 Pontiac Firebird 400 coupe

Overview
- Production: February 23, 1967 – January 1970
- Assembly: United States: Lordstown, Ohio (1967–1969); United States: Van Nuys, California (1968–1969); United States: Norwood, Ohio (1969)
- Designer: Jack Humbert

Body and chassis
- Body style: 2-door coupe 2-door convertible
- Platform: F-body
- Related: Chevrolet Camaro (first generation)

Powertrain
- Engine: 230 cu in (3.8 L) Pontiac SOHC I6; 250 cu in (4.1 L) Pontiac SOHC I6; 326 cu in (5.3 L) Pontiac V8; 350 cu in (5.7 L) Pontiac V8; 400 cu in (6.6 L) Pontiac V8
- Transmission: 2-speed automatic 3-speed Turbo-Hydramatic automatic 3-speed manual 4-speed manual

Dimensions
- Wheelbase: 108.1 in (2,746 mm) (1967)
- Length: 188.8 in (4,796 mm) (1967)
- Width: 72.6 in (1,844 mm) (1967)
- Height: 51.5 in (1,308 mm) (1967)

The first generation Firebird had characteristic Coke bottle styling shared with its cousin, the Chevrolet Camaro. Announcing a Pontiac styling trend, the Firebird's bumpers were integrated into the design of the front end, giving it a more streamlined look than the Camaro. The Firebird's rear "slit" taillights were inspired by the 1966–1967 Pontiac GTO and Pontiac Grand Prix. Both a two-door hardtop and a convertible were offered through the 1969 model year. Originally, the car was a "consolation prize" for Pontiac, which had desired to produce a two-seat sports car based on its original Banshee concept car. However, GM feared this would cut into Chevrolet Corvette sales, and gave Pontiac a piece of the "pony car" market by sharing the F-body platform with Chevrolet. The listed retail price before options for the coupe was $2,666 ($25,742 in 2025 dollars) and the convertible was $2,903 ($30,136 in 2025 dollars).

The 1967 base model Firebird came equipped with the Pontiac 230 cu in (3.8 L) SOHC inline-six. Based on the architecture of the standard Chevrolet 230 cu in (3.8 L) inline-six, it was fitted with a one-barrel Rochester carburetor and rated at 165 hp (123 kW). The "Sprint" model six came with a four-barrel carburetor, developing 215 hp (160 kW). Most buyers opted for one of three V8s: the 326 cu in (5.3 L) with a two-barrel carburetor producing 250 hp (186 kW); the four-barrel "HO" (high output) 326, producing 285 hp (213 kW); or the 325 hp (242 kW) 400 cu in (6.6 L) from the GTO. All 1967–1968 400 CI engines had throttle restrictors that blocked the carburetors' secondaries from fully opening. A "Ram Air" option was also available, providing functional hood scoops, higher flow heads with stronger valve springs, and a hotter camshaft. Power for the Ram Air package was the same as the conventional 400 HO, but peaked at 5,200 rpm.

The 230 cu in (3.8 L) engines were subsequently enlarged for 1968 to 250 cubic inches (4.1 liters), the base version developing an increased 175 hp (130 kW) using a one-barrel carburetor, and the high-output Sprint version the same 215 hp with a four-barrel carburetor. Also for the 1968 model, the 326 cu in (5.3 L) engine was replaced by the Pontiac 350 cu in (5.7 L) V8, which actually displaced 354 cu in (5.8 L), and produced 265 hp (198 kW) with a two-barrel carburetor. An HO version of the 350 cu in (5.7 L) with a revised cam was also offered to start in that year, which developed 320 hp (239 kW). The power output of the other engines was increased marginally.

There was an additional Ram Air IV option for the 400 cu in (6.6 L) V8 engines during 1969, complementing the Ram Air 400 (now often colloquially but incorrectly called the "Ram Air III," a name never used by Pontiac). The Ram Air IV was rated at 345 hp (350 PS; 257 kW) at 5000 rpm and 430 lb⋅ft (583 N⋅m) of torque at 3400 rpm; and 335 hp (340 PS; 250 kW) respectively. The 350 cu in (5.7 L) HO engine was revised again with a different cam and cylinder heads resulting in 325 hp (242 kW). During 1969 a special 303 cu in (5.0 L) engine was designed for Sports Car Club of America (SCCA) road racing applications that were not available in production cars.

Modifications for 1968 included the addition of federally-mandated side marker lights: for the front of the car, the turn signals were made larger and extended to wrap around the front edges of the car, and on the rear, the Pontiac (V-shaped) Arrowhead logo was added to each side. The front door vent-windows was replaced with a single pane of glass and Astro Ventilation, a fresh-air-inlet system. The 1969 model received a major facelift with a new front-end design but unlike the GTO, it did not have the Endura bumper. The instrument panel and steering wheel were revised. The ignition switch was moved from the dashboard to the steering column with the introduction of GM's new locking ignition switch/steering wheel.

In March 1969, a US$1,083 ($9,508 in 2025) optional handling package called the "Trans Am performance and appearance package", UPC "WS4", named after the Trans Am Series, was introduced. A total of 689 hardtops and eight convertibles were made.

Due to engineering problems that delayed the introduction of the new 1970 Firebird beyond the usual fall debut, Pontiac continued production of 1969 model Firebirds into the early months of the 1970 model year (the other 1970 Pontiac models had been introduced on September 18, 1969). By late spring of 1969, Pontiac had deleted all model-year references on Firebird literature and promotional materials, anticipating the extended production run of the then-current 1969 models.

Production totals
Model	1967	1968	1969
Two-door hardtop coupe	67,032	90,152	75,362
Two-door convertible	15,528	16,960	11,649
Two-door coupe Trans Am			689
Two-door convertible Trans Am			8
Total	82,560	107,112	87,708

=== Engines ===
1967	Std 230 cu in (3.8 L) Pontiac SOHC I6; 165 hp (123 kW)	W53 "Sprint" 230 CID Pontiac SOHC I6; 215 hp (160 kW)	L30 326 cu in (5.3 L) Pontiac V8; 250 hp (186 kW)	L76 326 CID Pontiac "H.O." V8; 285 hp (213 kW)	W66 400 cu in (6.6 L) Pontiac V8; 325 hp (242 kW)	L67 400 CID Pontiac Ram Air V8; 325 hp (242 kW)		
1968	Std 250 cu in (4.1 L) Pontiac SOHC I6; 175 hp (130 kW)	W53 "Sprint" 250CID Pontiac SOHC I6; 215 hp (160 kW)	L30 350 cu in (5.7 L) Pontiac V8; 265 hp (198 kW)	L76 350 CID Pontiac "H.O." V8; 320 hp (239 kW)	W66 400 CID Pontiac V8; 330 hp (246 kW)	L67 400 CID Pontiac Ram Air V8; 335 hp (250 kW)	L74 400 CID Pontiac "H.O." V8; 335 hp (250 kW)	L67 400 CID Pontiac Ram Air II V8; 340 hp (254 kW) (Note: On March 1, 1968, the L67 400CID Ram Air engine was deleted as an option and replaced with the same named L67 400CID Ram Air II engine. The new L67 was rated at 340 hp (250 kW), with revised cylinder heads that included round exhaust ports. The pistons and crankshaft were of forged construction and it included a higher lift cam with a more durable valvetrain.)
1969	Std 250 cu in (4.1 L) Pontiac SOHC I6; 175 hp (130 kW)	W53 "Sprint" 250 CID Pontiac SOHC I6; 230 hp (172 kW)	L30 350 cu in (5.7 L) Pontiac V8; 265 hp (198 kW)	L76 350 CID Pontiac "HO" V8; 325 hp (242 kW)	W66 400 CID Pontiac V8; 330 hp (246 kW)	L74 400 CID Pontiac "HO" Ram Air 400 V8; 335 hp (250 kW)	L67 400 CID Pontiac Ram Air IV V8; 345 hp (257 kW)	

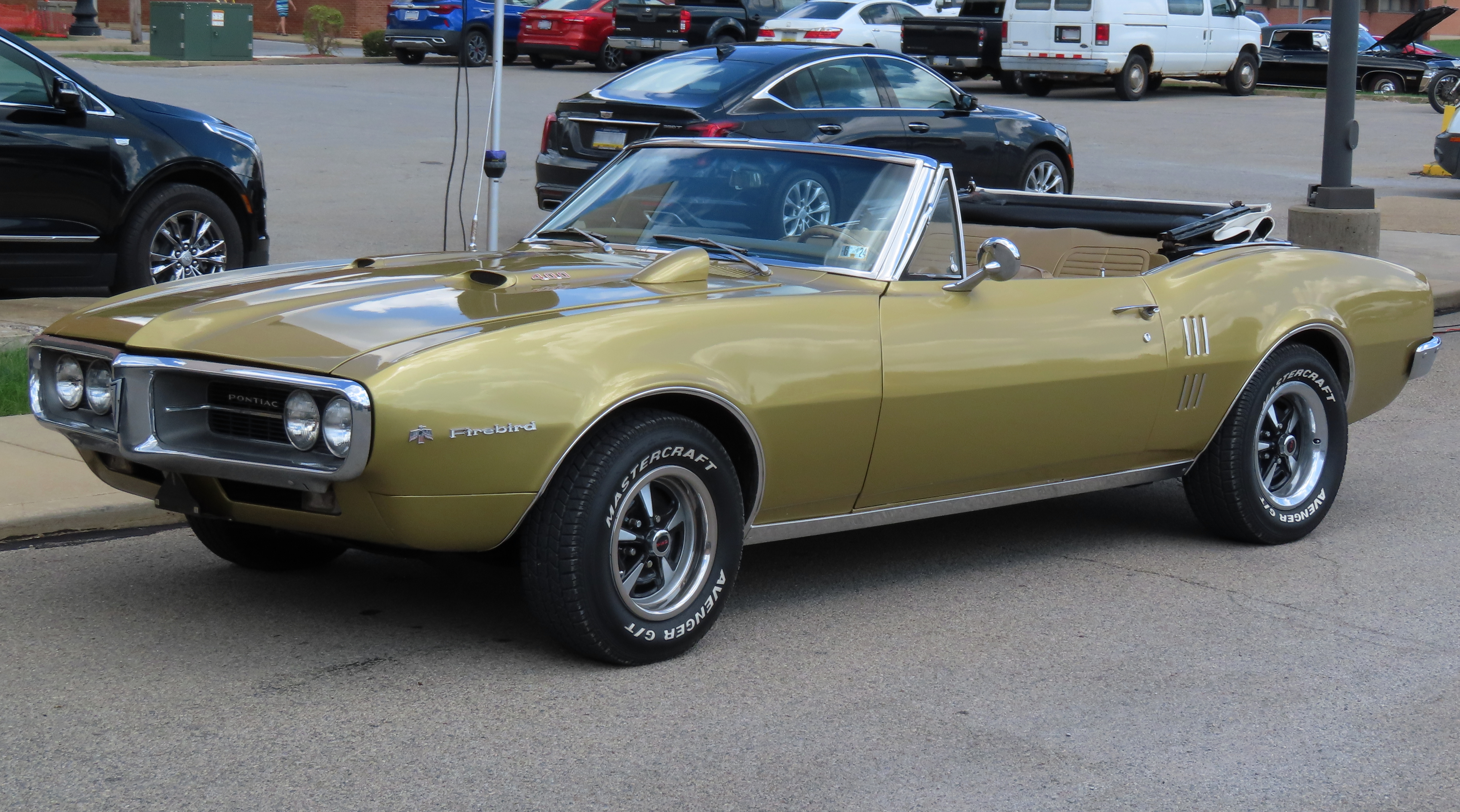
1967 Pontiac Firebird 400 convertible

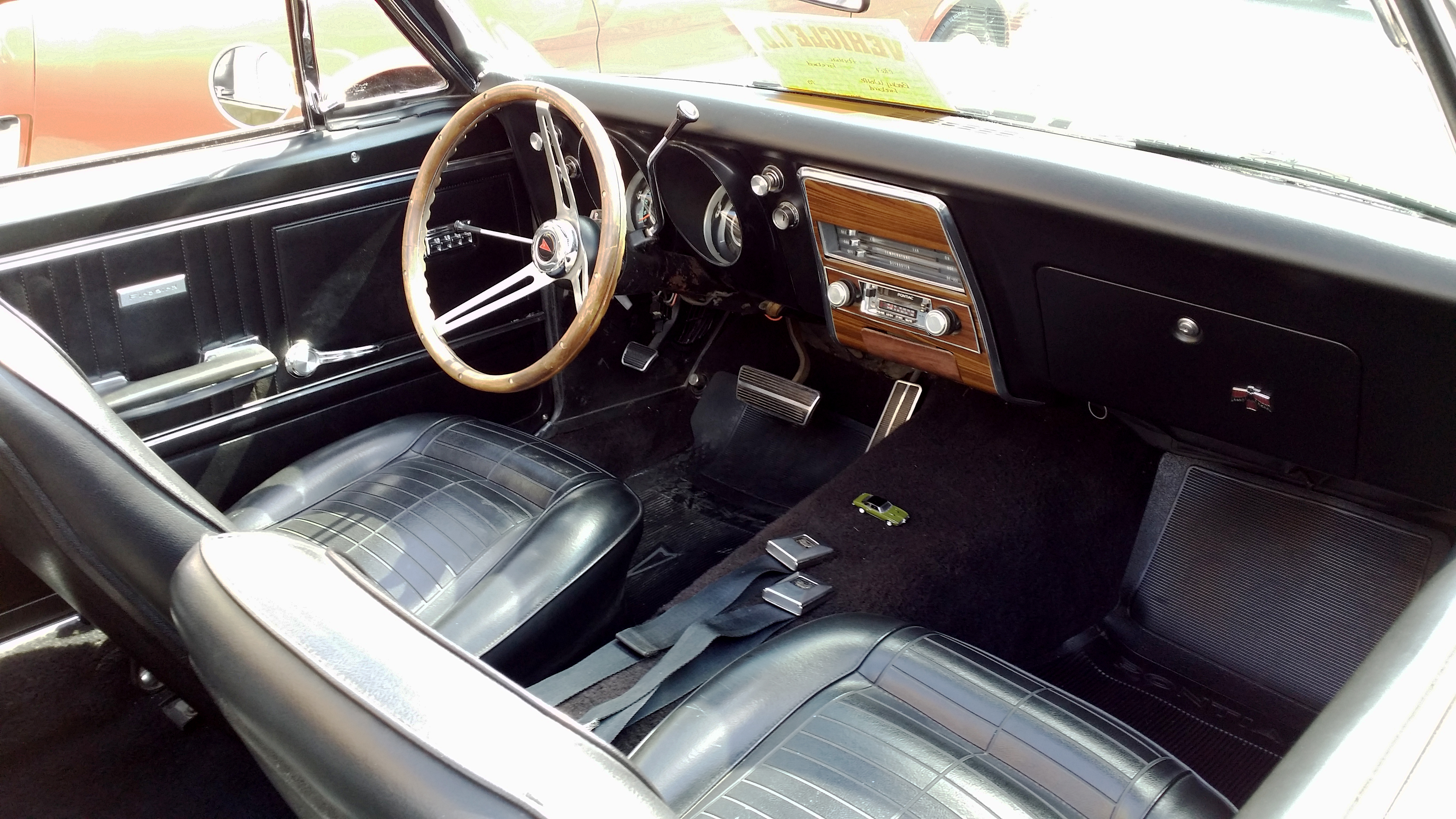
1967 Pontiac Firebird interior

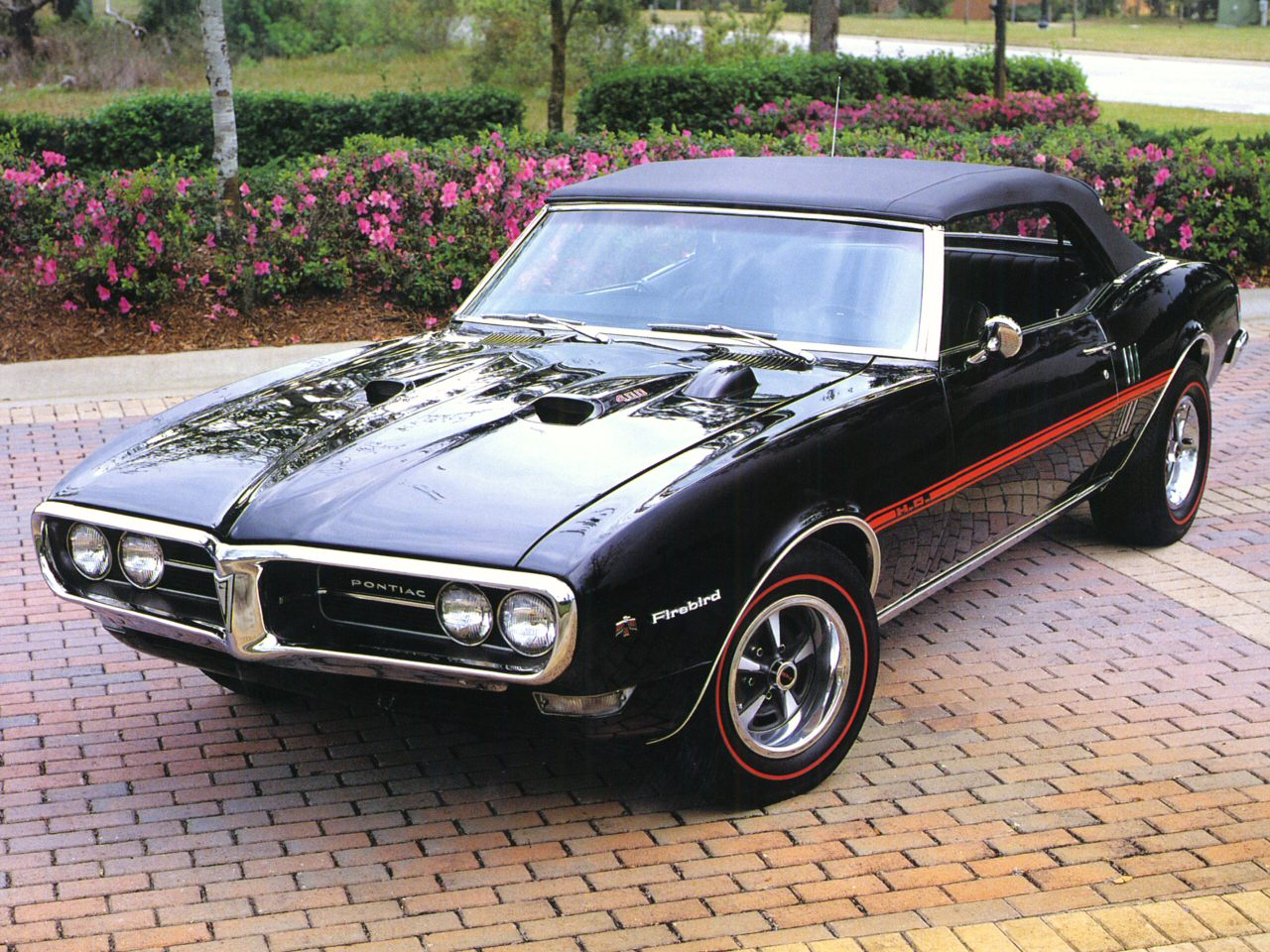
1968 Pontiac Firebird 400 HO convertible with the optional hood tach

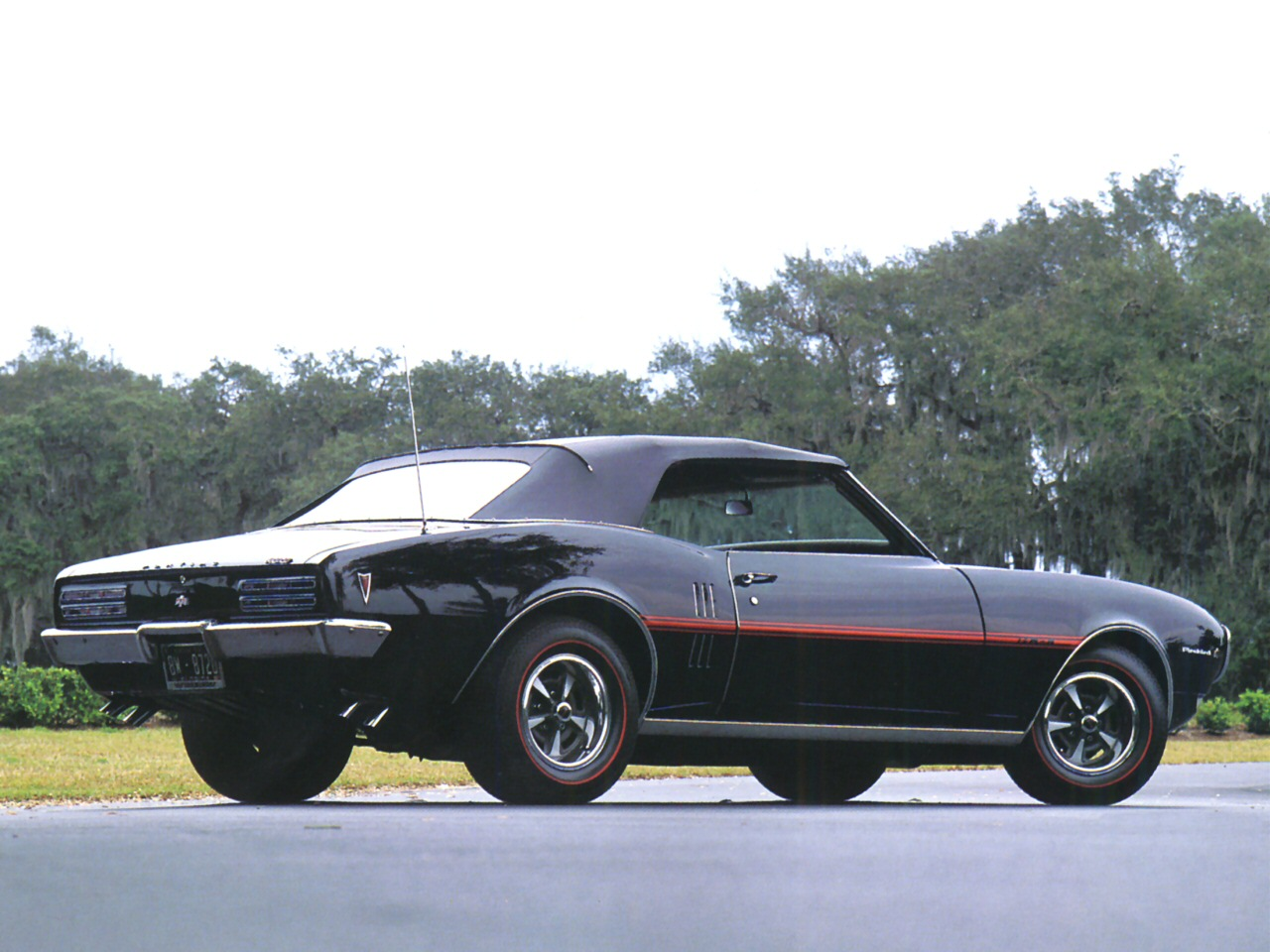
1968 Pontiac Firebird 400 HO convertible rear

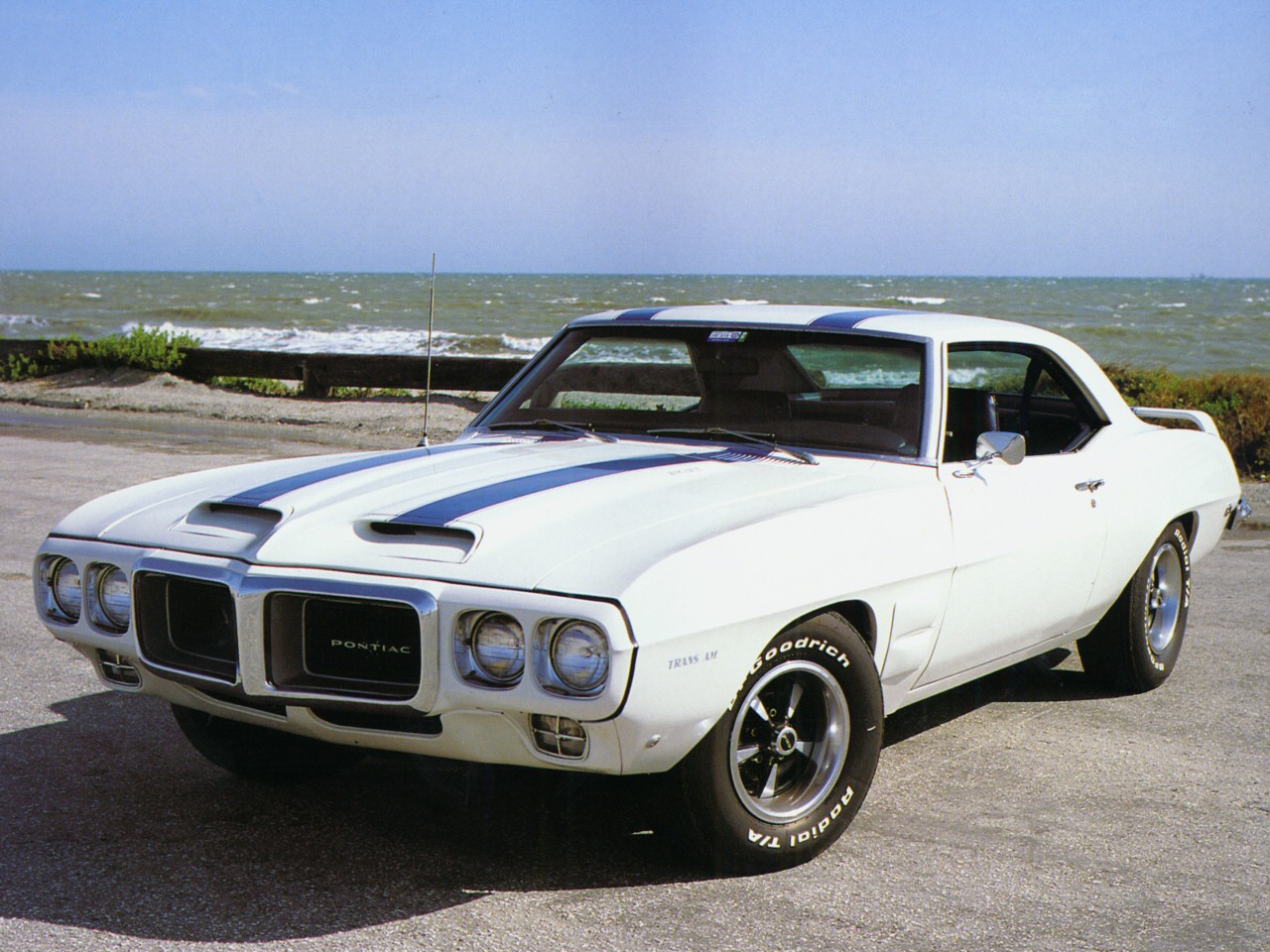
1969 Pontiac Firebird Trans Am

== Second generation (1970–1981) ==
Second generation
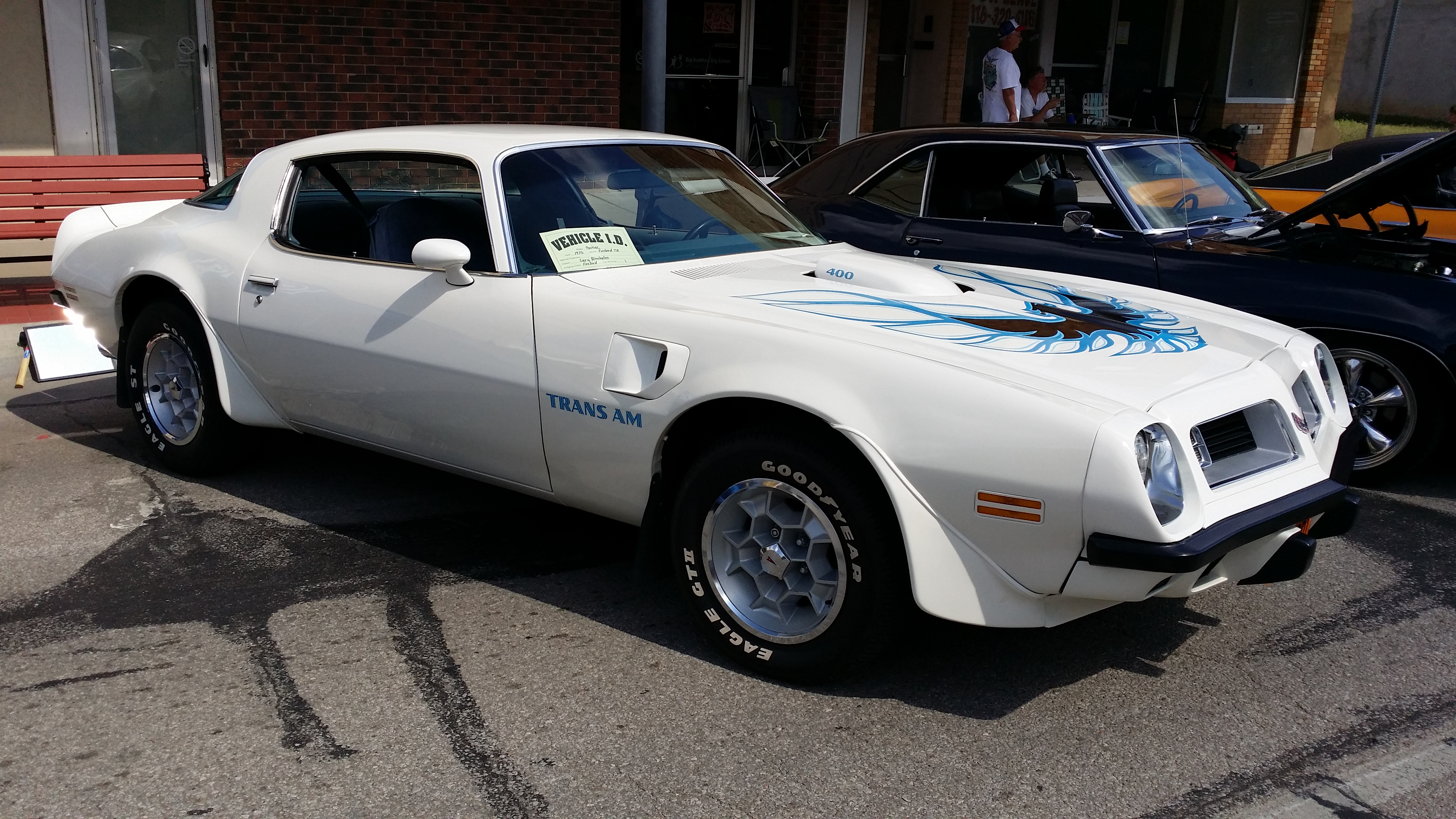
- 1975 Firebird Trans Am

Overview
- Production: 1970–1981
- Assembly: United States: Van Nuys, California (1970–1971, 1978–1981); United States: Norwood, Ohio (1970–1981)
- Designer: Bill Porter

Body and chassis
- Body style: 2-door coupe
- Platform: F-body
- Related: Chevrolet Camaro (second generation)

Powertrain
- Engine: 231 cu in (3.8 L) Buick V6; 250 cu in (4.1 L) Chevrolet I6; 265 cu in (4.3 L) Pontiac V8; 267 cu in (4.4 L) Chevrolet V8; 301 cu in (4.9 L) Pontiac V8; 301 cu in (4.9 L) Pontiac turbo V8; 305 cu in (5.0 L) Chevrolet V8; 350 cu in (5.7 L) Oldsmobile V8 (Note: Chevrolet 350, VIN code "L", and Oldsmobile 350, VIN code "R", engines were all used.); 350 cu in (5.7 L) Chevrolet V8; 350 cu in (5.7 L) Pontiac V8; 400 cu in (6.6 L) Pontiac V8; 403 cu in (6.6 L) Oldsmobile V8; 455 cu in (7.5 L) Pontiac V8
- Transmission: 3-speed manual 4-speed manual 2-speed automatic 3-speed automatic

Dimensions
- Wheelbase: 108.2 in (2,748 mm) (1978)
- Length: 196.8 in (4,999 mm) (1978)
- Width: 73.4 in (1,864 mm) (1978)
- Height: 49.3 in (1,252 mm) (1978)

The second-generation debut for the 1970 model year was delayed until February 26, 1970, because of tooling and engineering problems; thus, its colloquial designation as a 1970½ model, while leftover 1969s were listed in early Pontiac literature without a model-year identification. This generation of Firebirds were available in coupe form only; after the 1969 model year, convertibles were not available until 1989.

Replacing the "Coke bottle" styling was a more "swoopy" body style, while still retaining some traditional elements. The top of the rear window line went almost straight down to the lip of the trunk lid. The new design was initially characterized by a large C-pillar, until 1975 when the rear window was enlarged. Originally, the "wraparound" style window that occupied more of the C-pillar was initially supposed to be the design, but problems with the glue and sealing of the rear window led to the flat style window being used until the redesigned body in 1975. This style became the look that was to epitomize the F-body styling for the longest period during the Firebird's lifetime.

Models

- Firebird
- Firebird Esprit
- Firebird Formula
- Firebird Trans Am

=== 1970 ===
The first year of the second generation Firebird began offering a wider array of model subtypes and marked the appearance of the Firebird Esprit and the Firebird Formula. The Firebird Esprit was offered as a luxury model that came with appearance options, the deluxe interior package, and a Pontiac 350 as standard equipment. The Formula was advertised as an alternative to the Trans Am and could be ordered with all the options available to the Trans Am with the exception of the fender flares, shaker scoop, and fender heat extractors.

The base model Firebird came equipped with a 155 hp (116 kW) 250 cu in (4.1 L) inline-six. The Firebird Esprit and the Firebird Formula came standard with the 255 hp (190 kW), 350 cu in (5.7 L). The Esprit could be upgraded to a two-barrel carbureted 400 cu in (6.6 L), 265 hp (198 kW), while the Formula could be optioned to receive the L78 4 barrel 400 that produced 330 hp (246 kW) or the L74 Ram Air III 400 345 hp (257 kW).

There were two Ram Air 400 cu in (6.6 L) engines available for the 1970 Trans Am, carried over from 1969: the 335 hp (250 kW) L74 Ram Air III 400, and the 345 hp (257 kW) L67 Ram Air IV. The Ram Air IV was exclusive to the Trans Am, and could not be ordered on any of the lower Firebird models. The difference between the GTO and Firebird engines was that the secondary carburetor's throttle linkage had a restrictor which prevented the rear barrels from opening completely, altering the linkage could allow full carburetor operation resulting in identical engine performance.

For the 1970 and 1971 model years, all Firebirds equipped with radios had the antennae mounted "in-glass" in the windshield.

=== 1971 ===
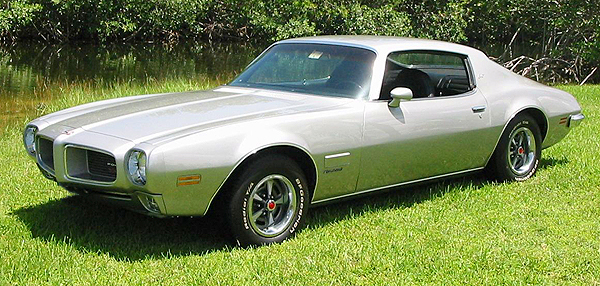
1971 Pontiac Firebird Esprit

The 1971 model year had a few minor changes to the Firebird. Fenders across all models featured a one-year-only exhaust vent seen on the lower half of the fenders. The interior options also changed to the newer style collared bucket seats in the deluxe interior, and the previous year's seats with the headrest were no longer available. The rear seat console was introduced as an option, and Honeycomb wheels became available for all Firebirds.

Engine selection saw the addition of Pontiac’s largest V8, the 455, available in the L75 325 hp (242 kW) version and the LS5 335 hp (250 kW) HO version. Both the 455 and 455 HO were available as engine options for the Firebird Formula, but the Trans Am received the 455 HO as standard equipment.

=== 1972 ===
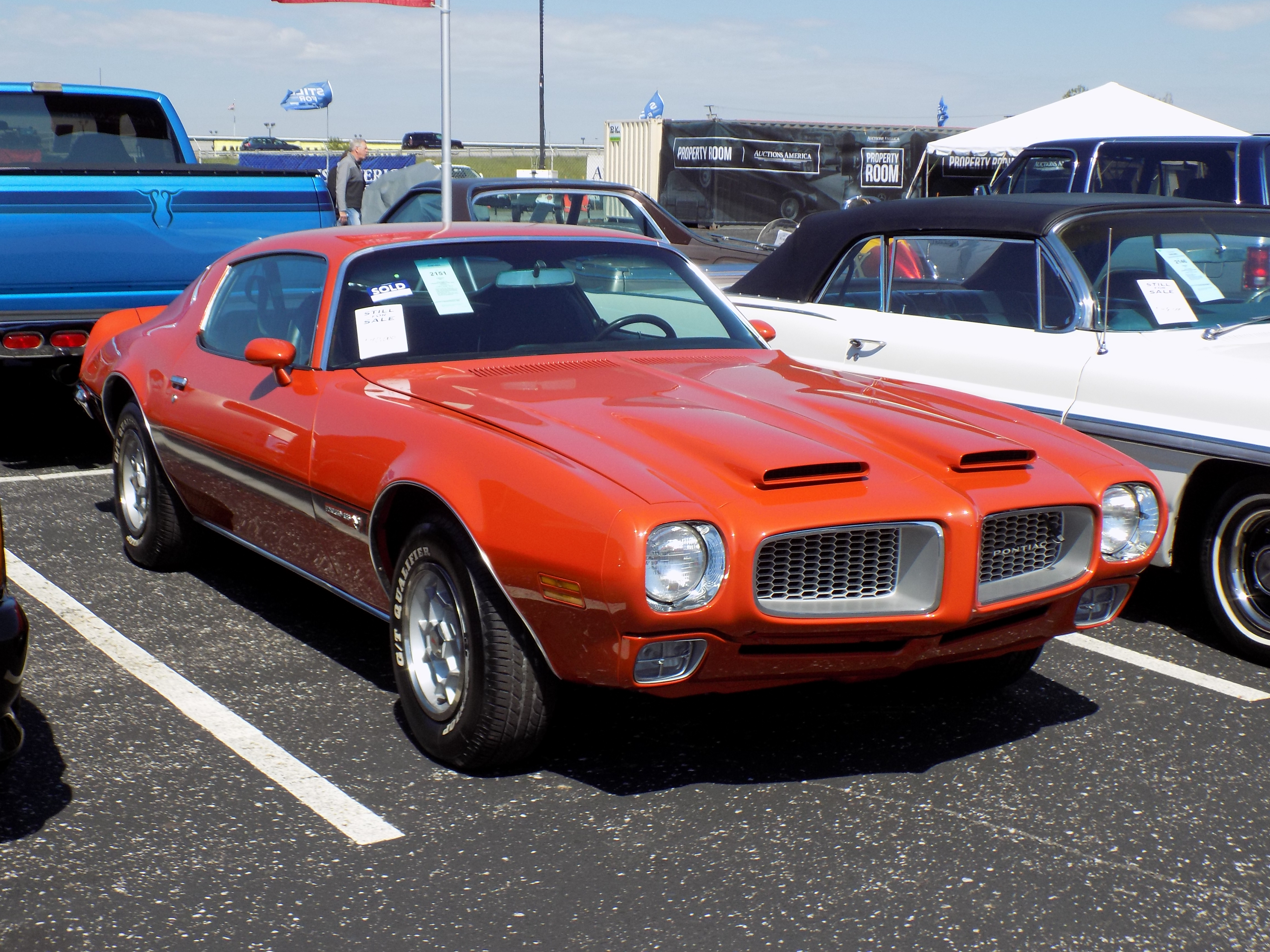
1972 Pontiac Firebird Formula 455 H.O., note honeycomb grille

During a 1972 strike, the Firebird (and the similar F-body Camaro) were nearly dropped.

The 1972 model year saw minor cosmetic changes. A difference that differentiates a 1972 Firebird from the other 1970-73 Firebirds is the hexagonal honeycomb grille insert on the nose of the vehicle.

1972 saw an industry-wide change to the way the engines were rated from the factory, with misleading SAE Gross horsepower ratings replaced by more accurate SAE Net figures. The compression ratio was also lowered for many engines to accept more environmentally friendly low-leaded fuel that had been mandated, further lowering power ratings.

Engine options remained mostly unchanged, however, the L75 455 engine was dropped, but the LS5 455 HO remained as an option for the Formula and standard for the Trans Am. Pontiac advertised the 1972 455 HO as de-tuned to 300 hp, but the engine was unchanged from 1971.

Starting in 1972, and continuing until 1977, the Firebird was only produced at the Norwood, Ohio, facility.

=== 1973 ===
In 1973, the Trans Am added two new colors, Buccaneer Red and Brewster Green. Other exterior upgrades included the updated more modern nose bird. The new hood bird was option "RPO WW7 Hood Decal", a $55 option exclusive to Trans Am. The "Trans Am" decals were larger than previous versions and shared the same accent color schemes as the hood bird.

Inside the 1973 Firebird, the standard interior equipment was almost the same as in prior years. A new "Horse Collar" optional custom interior featured new seat coverings and door panels. Interior colors were limited to Black, White, Red and Saddle, with the rare option for customers to order orange, red and blue carpet to any of the interior options. The 1973 Firebird also had to meet the new safety and emissions requirements for 1973. There were extra steel reinforcements in the bumper and core support to the fender.

The 1973 Trans Am engine displaced 455 cubic inches in the base L75 and the Super Duty LS2 option. The base 455 produced 40 fewer horsepower than the round port Super Duty 455. Horsepower for the base L75 455 was rated at 250 hp (186 kW) at 4000 rpm and 370 lb⋅ft (502 N⋅m) at 2800 rpm. Pontiac removed the H.O. designation from the base engine, and simply decaled the now non-functioning shaker with "455".

The "all hand-assembled" LS2 SD455 engine was rated at 290 hp (216 kW) at 4000 rpm and 395 lb⋅ft (536 N⋅m) at 3600 rpm. All Pontiac engines included a new EGR system, which delayed the SD-455 program until late into the production year. The shaker decal on the scoop read "SD-455".

The 1973 Trans Am introduced "Radial Tuned Suspension". When ordered, it included 15-inch radial tires. This delivered a more comfortable ride while also providing better cornering.

The 1973 Trans Am production was up over previous years, the L75 455 production was 3,130 with automatic and 1,420 with manual transmission. The special ordered $550 Option LS2 SD-455 production saw 180 automatics and 72 manuals.

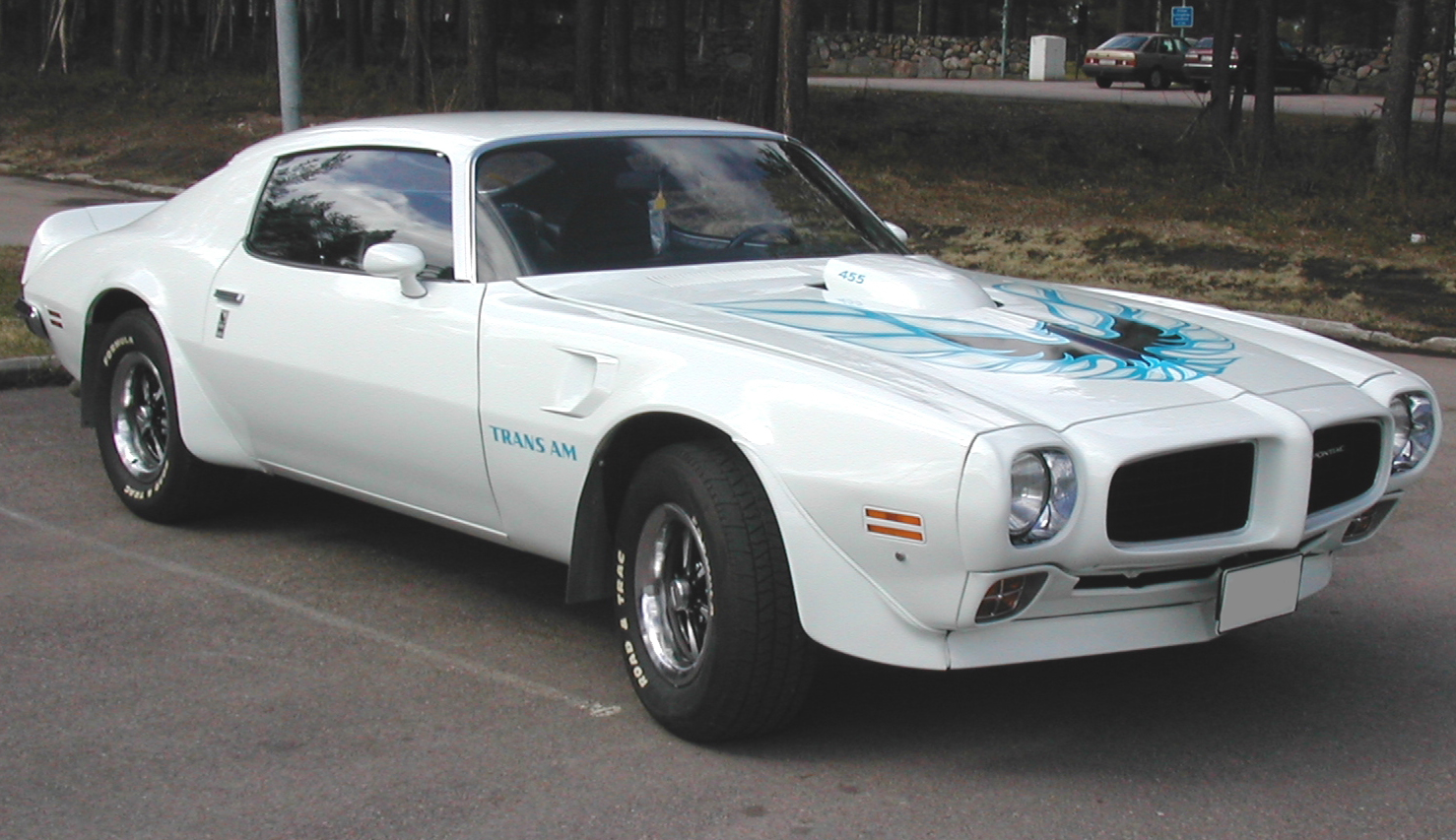
1973 Pontiac Firebird Trans Am

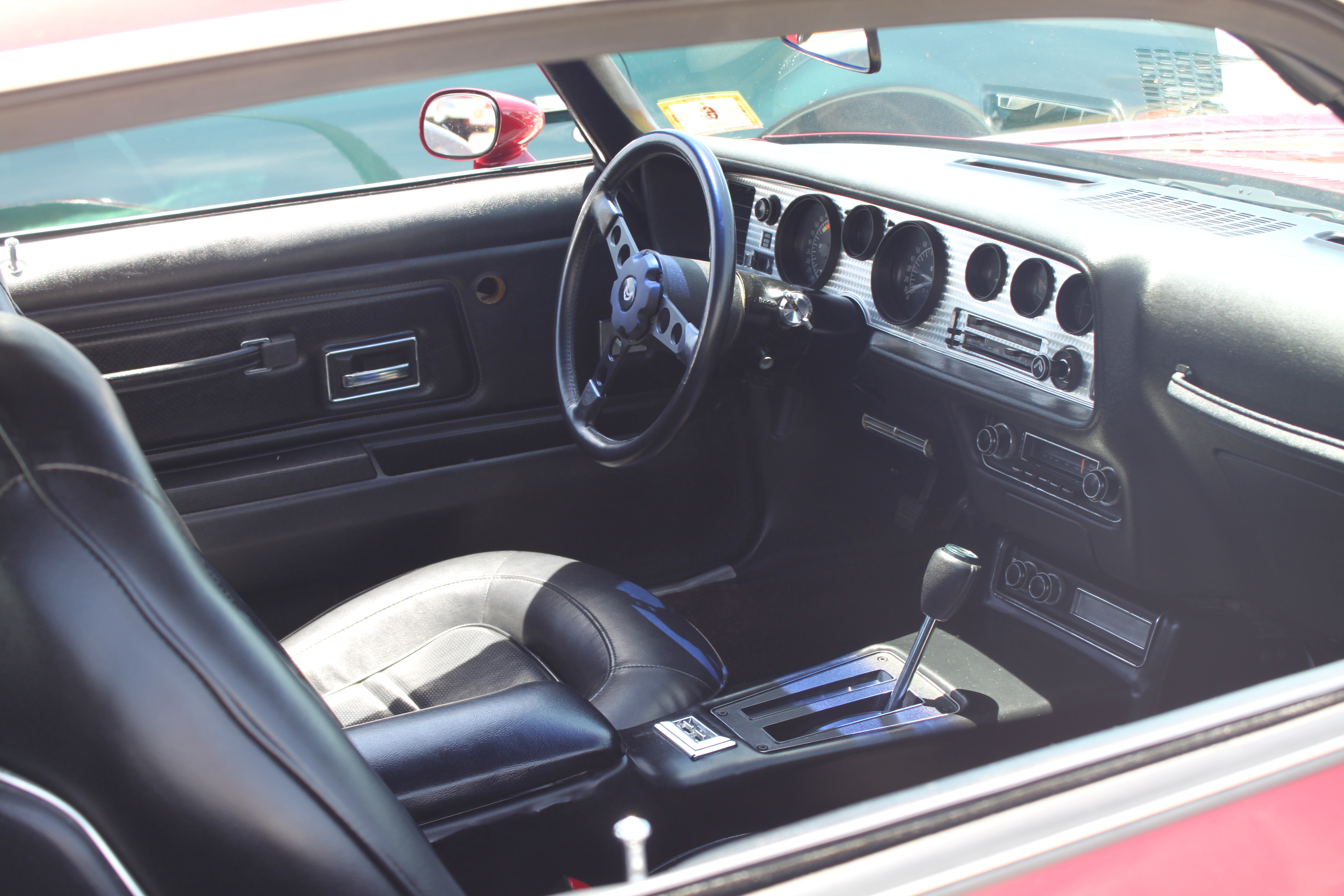
1973 Pontiac Firebird Trans Am interior

=== 1974 ===
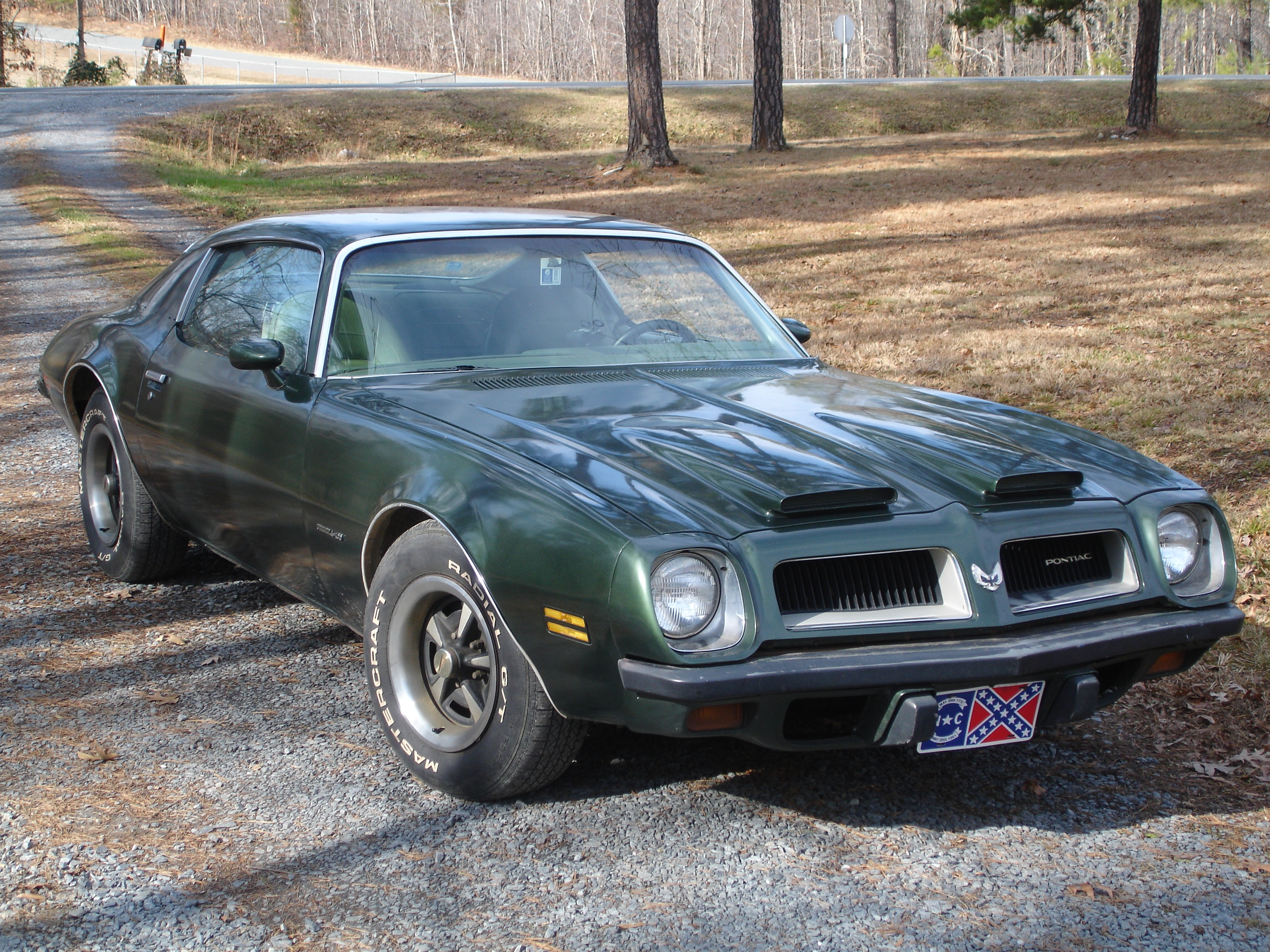
1974 Pontiac Firebird Formula

Curb weights rose dramatically in the 1974 model year because of the implementation of 5 mph (8.0 km/h) telescoping bumpers and various other crash- and safety-related structural enhancements; SD455 Trans Ams weighed in at 3,850 lb (1,746 kg) in their first year of production (1974 model year; actually 1973).

The 1974 models featured a redesigned "shovel-nose" front end and new wide "slotted" taillights. The 400, 455, and SD-455 engines were offered in the Trans Am and Formula models during 1974. A June 1974 test of a newly delivered, privately owned SD-455 Trans Am appeared in Super Stock and Drag Illustrated. With an unmodified car and a test weight of 4,010 lbs the testers clocked 14.25 seconds at 101 mph. The car had a Turbo-Hydramatic 400 3-speed automatic transmission and came equipped with air conditioning, an option that added considerable weight to the car and engine. Output was 290 hp (216 kW) at 4,400 RPM. A production line stock 1974 SD455 produced 253 hp (189 kW) on a chassis dyno, as reported by High-Performance Pontiac magazine (January 2007). This is consistent with the 290 SAE net horsepower factory rating (as measured at the crankshaft).

A 1974 Firebird was driven by Jim Rockford in the pilot movie and the first season (1974–1975) of The Rockford Files; every following season, Rockford would change to the next model year. However, in the sixth season (1979–1980), Rockford continued to drive the 1978 Firebird from season five, as the star, James Garner, disliked the 1979 model's restyled front end. The cars in the show were badged as a lower-tier bronze-coloured Firebird Esprit, however, these cars were in actuality de-badged Firebird Formula 400's that had the twin-scoop hood replaced with a standard flat base model Firebird hood. At many points throughout the show, the twin exhausts and rear anti-roll bars were visible, which were not available on the Esprit.

=== 1975 ===
The 1975 models featured new wraparound rear windows that curved out to occupy more of the B-Pillars, but the rear body shape and bumper remained unchanged. The turn signals were moved up from the valance panel to the grills which helped distinguish the 1975 from the 1974 front end as they are otherwise similar. This was also the last year of the larger profile larger snout Formula hood for the Firebird Formula.

The LS2 Super Duty engine and Turbo-Hydramatic 400 three-speed automatic were no longer available in 1975. Due to the use of catalytic converters starting in 1975, the TH400 would not fit alongside the catalytic converter underneath the vehicle. The smaller Turbo-Hydramatic 350 3-speed automatic was deemed suitable as the power output for the engine had significantly decreased from the earlier years. The TH350 drew less power and also did not require an electronic kick down system. The Pontiac L78 400 was standard in the Trans Am and the 455 was optional for both 1975 and 1976 models.

1975 also saw the start of the "500557" (in addition to similar cast codes starting with 5) cast 400 engine blocks entering production. The 500557 blocks were considered a weaker cast, as they had a lower nickel content, and had metal shaved off in the lower journals of the block to decrease the overall weight and cost. These blocks were used until the W72 engine reverted to the original specifications from the start of the decade with the 481988 cast in late 1977.

Originally, the L75 455 7.5L V8 was dropped entirely, but it returned mid-year, available only with a four-speed Borg Warner Super T-10, and it was no longer available for the Formula. Although it was brought back as the "455 HO", it was not the same engine as the 1971-1972 LS2 455 HO seen in the earlier Firebirds. It was a standard D-port engine with a low profile camshaft and restrictive exhaust system that was also seen in the larger body Pontiac platforms. Power output was restricted to 200 HP with a torque rating of 330 lb⋅ft at 2,000 rpm. It was the largest displacement "performance" engine still available. Track testing in 1975 showed the 455 capable of 16.12-second quarter-mile time, which was similar to the L82 Corvette.

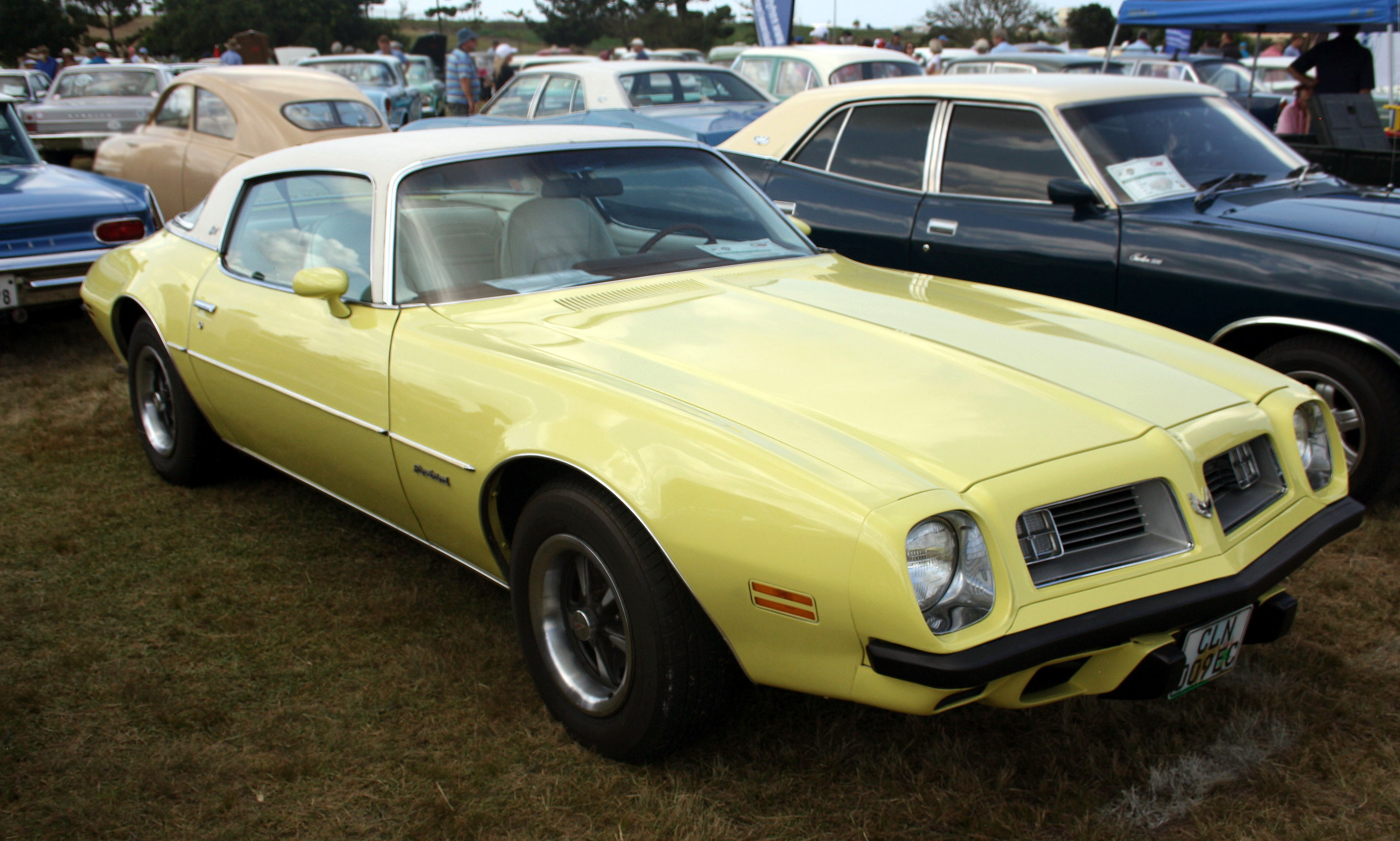
1975 Pontiac Firebird Esprit

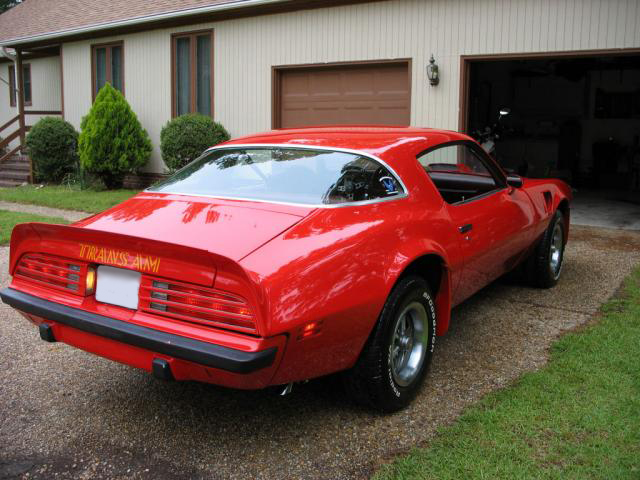
Rear view of 1975 Trans Am

=== 1976 ===
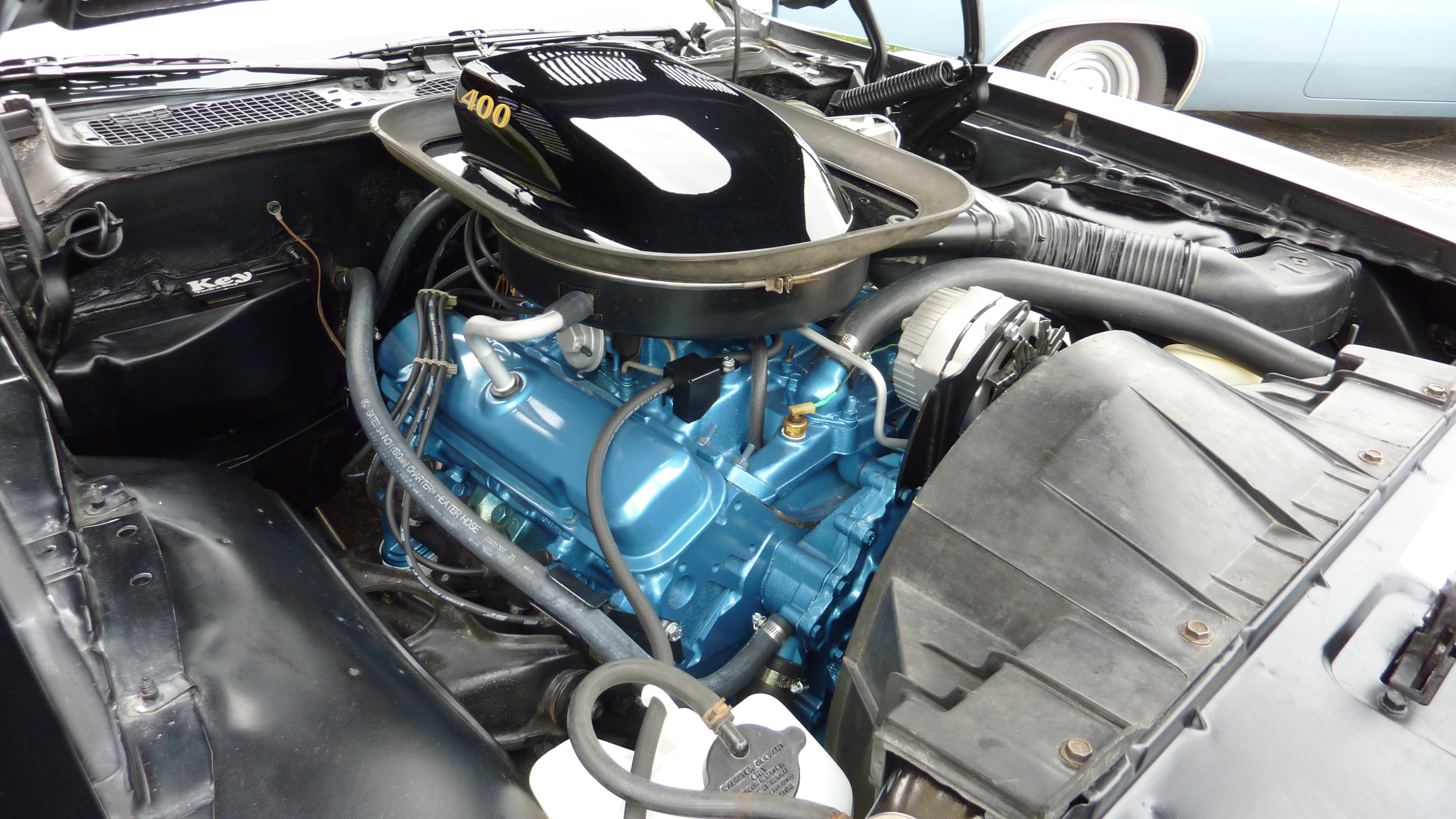
A 1976 Pontiac L78 400CID V8

The 1976 model year saw a design revision that did away with the rubber bumperettes on the front and rear bumpers. Instead, the body featured a sleeker design with polyurethane front and rear bumpers that adhered to the safety standards at the time. The interior design was unchanged from the standard interior, however, the deluxe interior seats had changed to feature larger and deeper buckets. The engine options across the Firebird remained the same as the previous year. This was the last year for the optional 15x7 honeycomb wheels. 1976 marked the end of the Pontiac L75 455 7.5L V8, as it could no longer meet the tightening emissions restrictions, and the "HO" moniker used the year prior was dropped. The L75 was only available with a four-speed manual Borg Warner Super T-10 and was exclusive to the Trans Am.

1976 also introduced the "W50 appearance package" for the Formula model line, consisting of a two-tone appearance package with lower accents across the bottom of the body, a large "Formula" decal across the bottom of each door, and a Firebird decal on the rear spoiler. The Formula had a one-year exclusive steel hood design with smaller recessed, less pronounced hood snorkels for this model year.

Pontiac celebrated its 50th anniversary year in 1976. To commemorate this event, Pontiac unveiled a special Trans Am option at the 1976 Chicago Auto Show. Designated the RPO code Y82, it was painted in black with gold accents, this was the first "anniversary" Trans Am package and the first production black and gold special edition. A removable T-top developed by Hurst was set to be included on all Y82 50th Anniversary T/As, but proved problematic in installation and quality control, leading most Y82s to not be delivered with the Hurst T-top roof. All Hurst T-top equipped cars were built at the Norwood, Ohio, factory. 110 of the Y82s equipped with the L75 455 engine received the Hurst T-tops.

T-Tops became a regular production option for other Firebirds in 1977. The Y82 option included exclusive black and gold decals, gold pinstriping along the body of the car, a Formula steering wheel with gold spokes and horn button, gold honeycomb 15x7 wheels, gold window crank covers (if ordered with power windows), a gold shifter button for automatic cars, and a gold aluminum machined dash bezel with a black outline.

=== 1977 ===
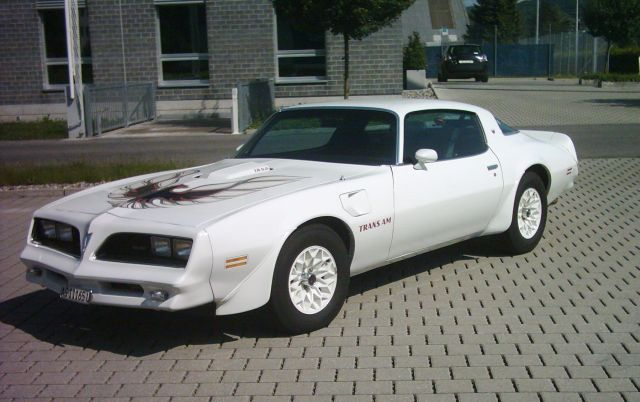
A 1977 Pontiac Firebird Trans Am with an early low-profile shaker

The 1977 Firebird received a facelift that featured four rectangular headlamps. The shaker scoop was also revised for this year, with the early 1977-built T/As coming with off-center, lower-profile shaker scoops. The Formula hood was changed for the last time for the second generation with a much lower profile. The snowflake wheel became an option for all Firebirds and was standard with the Y82 appearance package, although it could be replaced with Rally II wheels as a credit option.

For the Esprit, an optional appearance package RPO W60 called the "Skybird appearance package" became available, featuring an all-blue exterior and interior. This package was originally slated to be called the "Bluebird" similar to the "Yellowbird" and "Redbird" packages to follow in the upcoming model years, but the name was already in use for a company that produced school buses.

In 1977, General Motors began to source a larger selection of V8 engines to supply in the lower model Firebirds, and the Oldsmobile 350 (5.7L) & 403 (6.6L) V8, as well as the Chevrolet 305 (5.0L) & 350 (5.7L) V8, became options for the Firebird, Esprit, and Formula after June 1977. Previously, the Chevrolet inline-six was the only outsourced engine in a Firebird. Pontiac made the 301 (4.9 L) V8 available for order in the lower Firebird models, but due to such high demand and popularity, they removed its availability from the Firebird model to allow enough 301 engines for the other Pontiac lines. It was re-introduced as an option in 1979 as production for the 400 ceased and tooling was converted over to the 301.

The Trans Am now had three different engine options, the standard Pontiac L78 400, the optional extra-cost Pontiac W72 400, and the Oldsmobile-sourced L80 403. The 1977 models also saw the cubic inch numbers on the shaker switched in favor of the metric displacement. The shakers had a "6.6 Litre" decal for all L78 Pontiac 400 and L80 Oldsmobile 403 engines. Only the optional W72 Pontiac 400 received the "T/A 6.6" decal.

As Pontiac had discontinued the 455 in the previous model year, a modified 400 Pontiac V8 dubbed the "T/A 6.6" with the RPO W72 became available as a pay-extra upgrade to the standard L78 400. It came featured with a tuned four-barrel 800CFM Rochester Quadrajet carburetor and was rated at 200 bhp (203 PS; 149 kW) at 3,600 rpm and a maximum torque of 325 lb⋅ft (441 N⋅m) at 2,400 rpm, as opposed to the regular "6.6 Litre" 400 (RPO L78) rated at 180 hp (134 kW). The T/A 6.6 engine also came equipped with chrome valve covers, while the base 400 engines had blue painted valve covers. For 1977, the W72 shared the same air cleaner and shared the same 500577 cast block as the L78, but received the 6x4 heads, whereas the L78 only received the lower compression 6x8 heads. The 6x4 heads were used on early Pontiac 350 blocks that helped increase the compression and also had hardened valve seats for a higher RPM operating range.

The Oldsmobile 403 was implemented as the 400 Pontiac could not satisfy emissions requirements for high-altitude states and California. Wanting to still offer a 6.6 L option for the Trans Am, the 403 Olds was seen as a suitable replacement as when equipped with an A.I.R emissions system, it could satisfy the emissions criteria for these states and still offer the power ratings expected of the Trans Am. The L80 Oldsmobile 403 V8 had slightly more power than the standard L78 Pontiac 400 at 185 hp (138 kW) and offered the same low-end torque of 320 lb⋅ft (430 N⋅m) at a more usable operating range of 2,200rpm.

From 1977 until 1981, the Firebird used four square headlamps, while the Camaro continued to retain the two round headlights that had been shared by both second-generation designs. The 1977 Trans Am Y82 Special Edition gained significant fame after its film debut in Smokey and the Bandit, leading to a drastic increase in sales of the Pontiac Firebird in the following years, and its current day collectability.

=== 1978 ===
Changes for 1978 were slight, with a switch from a honeycomb to a crosshatch pattern grille being the most notable change to the body style. The decals for the standard Trans Ams changed from the "looping style" lettering to the "block-style" font that would remain on the Firebird until the end of the second generation. The optional T-Tops transitioned from Hurst installed units to Fisher units designed and created "in-house" by GM in mid-year 1978. Pontiac also introduced the Red Bird package on the Firebird Esprit model. Painted in Code 72 Roman Red with a matching deluxe Carmine Red interior, it demonstrated gold accents with a unique Red Bird graphic on the exterior b-pillars. It also included a Formula steering wheel with gold spokes and gold dash bezel, similar to the ones included in the Special Edition package, however, the red and gold steering wheel was exclusive to the Red Bird Esprit.

A new appearance package on offer for the Trans Am was the gold Y88 Special Appearance package, available for order in late 1977. It was a new variation of the black Y82 Special Appearance Package and featured an all-gold color palette, exclusive gold mirrored T-Tops, 15x7 snowflake aluminum wheels, and a new 5-color gold hood decal. All Y88s were painted in paint code 51 Solar Gold and always featured code 62 Camel Tan interior, however, the WS6 Special Performance Package, deluxe interior and tan-colored seatbelts were still pay-extra options. The Y88 featured brown pinstriping, as opposed to the gold pinstriping on the Y82/Y84 package, and included the new design 5-color hood decal and block-style gold font callouts. The Y88 SE debuted the Fisher-style T-Top roof and featured special gold tinted Fisher glass tops exclusive to the Y88. There are no confirmed documented examples of hard-top Y88s made. The Y88 was discontinued due to problems Pontiac experienced with the Solar Gold paint such as streaking in the paint, or a green discoloration with the water-based paint used at the Van Nuys assembly plant. It was then changed back to the black Y84 (replaced RPO Y82) Special Appearance package for the remainder of the 1978 Special Edition Trans Ams built.

The W72 engine option also saw a revision to the camshaft duration and the tuning of the Rochester Quadrajet which led to a 10% increase in horsepower from the prior year, bringing the total to 220 hp. Additionally, the earlier stronger and more durable 481988 cast block returned on the W72, denoted with a large "XX" cast protruding on the side of the block near the cast code. The WS6 Trans Am Special Performance package developed by Herb Adams was introduced as a handling option for the Trans Am, including a larger diameter rear sway bar, tighter ratio steering box, 15x8-inch snowflake wheels, additional frame bracing, as well as other suspension changes. Initially, the W72 engine was bundled in with the WS6 package, but mid-year, the options separated and became two pay-extra items on the dealer invoice. Delays in manufacturing prevented the rear disc brake (RPO J65) from being available in the 1978 model year. Approximately 23.1% (28,239) of Trans Ams in 1978 had the WS6 option according to Pontiac sales information at the start of 1979.

=== 1979 ===
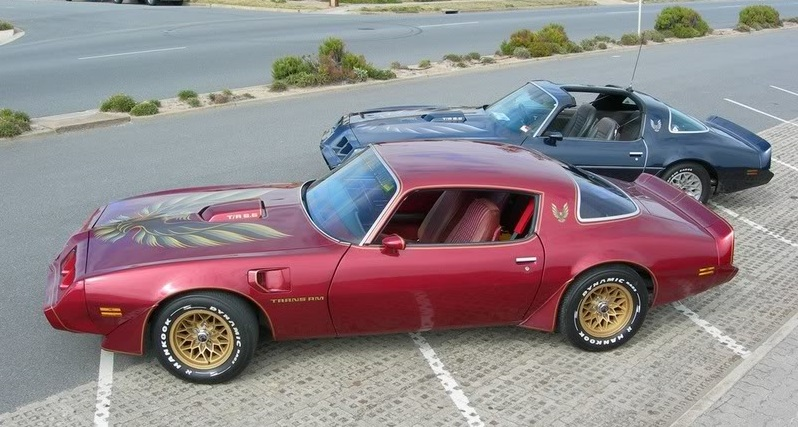
Two late '70s Trans Ams, in T-top and hardtop versions. No Firebird was ever offered from factory in the right-hand-drive configuration

The body was completely restyled for 1979, featuring a new aerodynamic front end, revised rear end spoiler, larger flares for the Trans Am, and a revised connected single taillight assembly design that would remain consistent for the rest of the Firebird's design. The grilles had been repositioned to the lower section of the front bumper to allow more cold air to travel directly to the lower part of the radiator and engine bay. The interior remained mostly unchanged from the previous model year, however, the deluxe cloth interior had now changed from velour to a Hobnail pattern. The hood decal from the Y88 SE and Solar Gold cars from 1978 became the standard design across the entire Trans Am line and now came in a variety of colors. The Formula steering wheel that was optional in the lower models and standard in the Trans Am now came color coded to the interior.

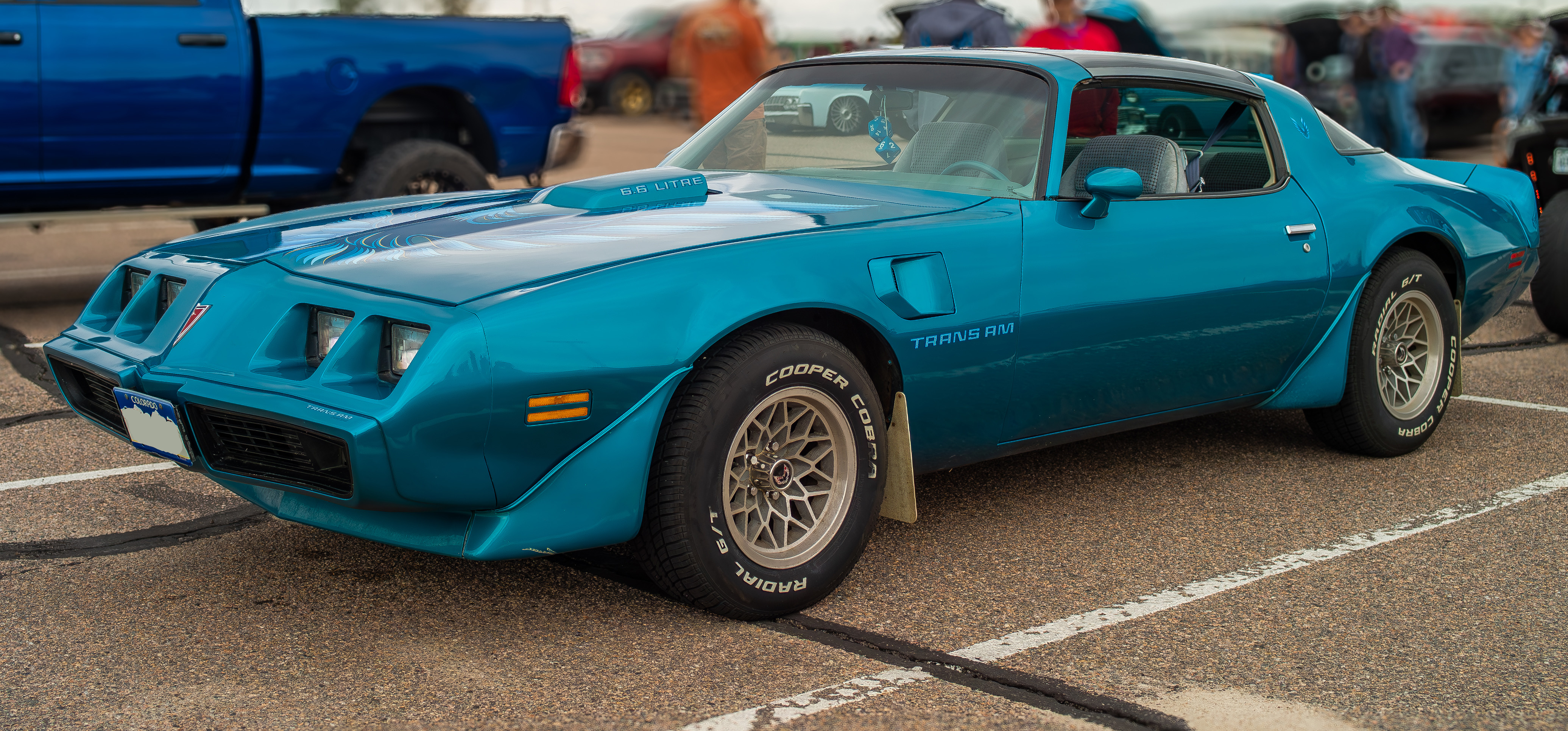
A 1979 Atlantis Blue Trans Am equipped with the Oldsmobile 403 V8

For 1979, there were three possible engine options. The L80 Oldsmobile 403 6.6L V8 engine became the standard option and was only available with the Turbo Hydramatic 350 3-speed automatic. The W72 Pontiac 400 6.6L V8 was available for a short period and in limited supply. This was the last of the line for the Pontiac large displacement V8 engines, and only available with the 4-speed manual Borg-Warner Super T-10 transmission, while also requiring the WS6 handling package as mandatory equipment in conjunction with this driveline choice. A credit option was available, being the smaller displacement L37 Pontiac 301 4.9L V8, and it could come with either the Super T-10 four-speed manual transmission or the Turbo Hydramatic 350 3-speed automatic.

The Formula received some revisions for the 1979 model year, where the two-tone W50 colored stripe decal now became the standard look for the Formula, however, the W50 package was still available and it added the "Formula" lettering along the bottom of the doors and rear deck spoiler. The WS6 package had now been renamed from the "Trans Am Mk IV Special Handling Package" to the "Special Handling Package" as it was now available for the Firebird Formula. The dashboard bezel now wore the same machined swirl aluminum bezel as the Trans Am. As the Pontiac 301 had now ramped up production as the Pontiac 400 production had ceased, it became the standard engine for the Formula. Due to significant popularity and demand for the option to receive 4-wheel disc brakes in the WS6 handling package, some WS6 equipped cars were shipped without the option of rear disc brakes and were instead coded WS7, but still received all other equipment included in the WS6 package.

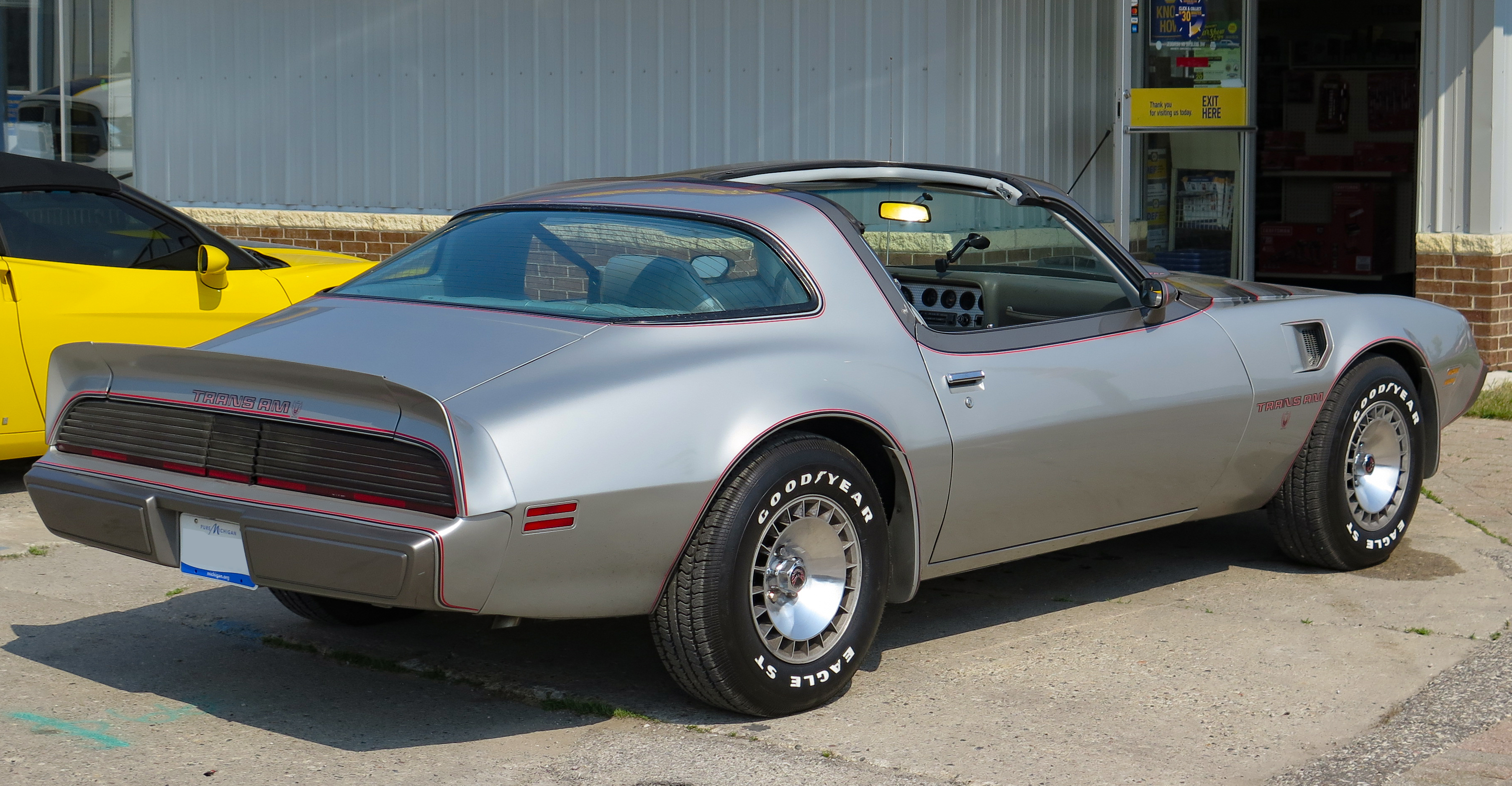
A 1979 Y89 Tenth Anniversary Trans Am

A limited-edition Firebird to commemorate the 10th anniversary of the 1969 Firebird Trans Am was produced for the 1979 model year. It featured platinum silver paint with charcoal gray upper paint accents, mirrored T-tops, 15x8" "Turbo" wheels, a special interior featuring silver leather seats with custom-embroidered Firebird emblems, and aircraft-inspired red lighting for the gauges. Colloquially known as the "TATA" (Tenth Anniversary Trans Am), it featured every single available production option on the Firebird, however, cruise control was not compatible with the manual transmission resulting in the option being credited on the window sticker for the 4-speed equipped TATAs. The TATA also featured special 10th-anniversary decals, including a Firebird hood decal that extended off of the hood and onto the front fenders. Pontiac produced 7,500 Y89 TATAs (RPO Y89), of which 1,817 were equipped with the Pontiac "T/A 6.6" W72 400 engine and 4-speed manual transmission. The remainder all featured the L80 Oldsmobile 403 and automatic 3-speed transmission. Two TATAs were the actual pace cars for the 1979 Daytona 500, which had been dubbed "the race that made NASCAR".

Car and Driver magazine named the Trans Am equipped with the WS6 Special Performance Package the best handling car of 1979. During period dyno testing, the National Hot Rod Association rated the "T/A 6.6" W72 Pontiac 400 engine at 260–280 net horsepower, which was significantly higher than Pontiac's conservative rating of 220 hp. In 1979 Pontiac sold 116,535 Trans Ams, the highest sold in any Firebird model year.

=== 1980 ===
In 1980, ever-increasing emissions restrictions led Pontiac to drop all of its large-displacement engines. The year saw the biggest engine changes for the Trans Am. The 301, offered in 1979 as a credit option, was now the standard engine. No manual transmission was available for the Firebird in 1980, all received the 3-speed automatic Turbo Hydramatic 350. Dealer order information listed a 3-speed manual available with the Buick V6 in the base model Firebird, however, none were ordered or built.

Optional engines for the Trans Am and Formula included a turbocharged 301 4.9L V8 or the LG4 Chevrolet 305 5.0L V8 small block. The Chevrolet 305 was mandatory in Californian and High Altitude emission states. There were three different iterations of the 301 in 1980, the L37 301, the W72 301 E/C "T/A 4.9", and the LU8 301 Turbo. The W72 E/C 301 was standard for the Trans Am and optional for the Formula, however, the W72 E/C could be deleted on the Trans Am and instead come equipped with the standard L37 301 with a credit. The turbocharged 301 used a Garrett TB305 turbo attached to a single Rochester Quadrajet four-barrel carburetor and featured a hood-mounted "boost" gauge that would light up as the TB305 accumulated boost. The hood of the 301T equipped Firebirds had a large offset bulge to accommodate for the mounting position of the carburetor on the engine as the turbocharger exhaust occupied a large amount of space in the engine bay. The 301T equipped cars were restricted to an automatic transmission, a 3.08 rear differential ratio, and were required to have A/C. A memo from Pontiac to dealers in late 1980 mandated that all 301T cars must be ordered with J65 rear disc brakes or the orders would be rejected. However, the WS6 Special Handling Package was never mandatory with the 301 Turbo.

The Redbird Esprit was discontinued in 1980, and the new Yellowbird Esprit was introduced. This was the last year to feature the colored Esprit appearance packages. It featured a two-tone yellow exterior with yellow snowflake wheels, a deluxe Camel Tan interior, a gold dash bezel, special yellow Firebird decals, and a Formula steering wheel.

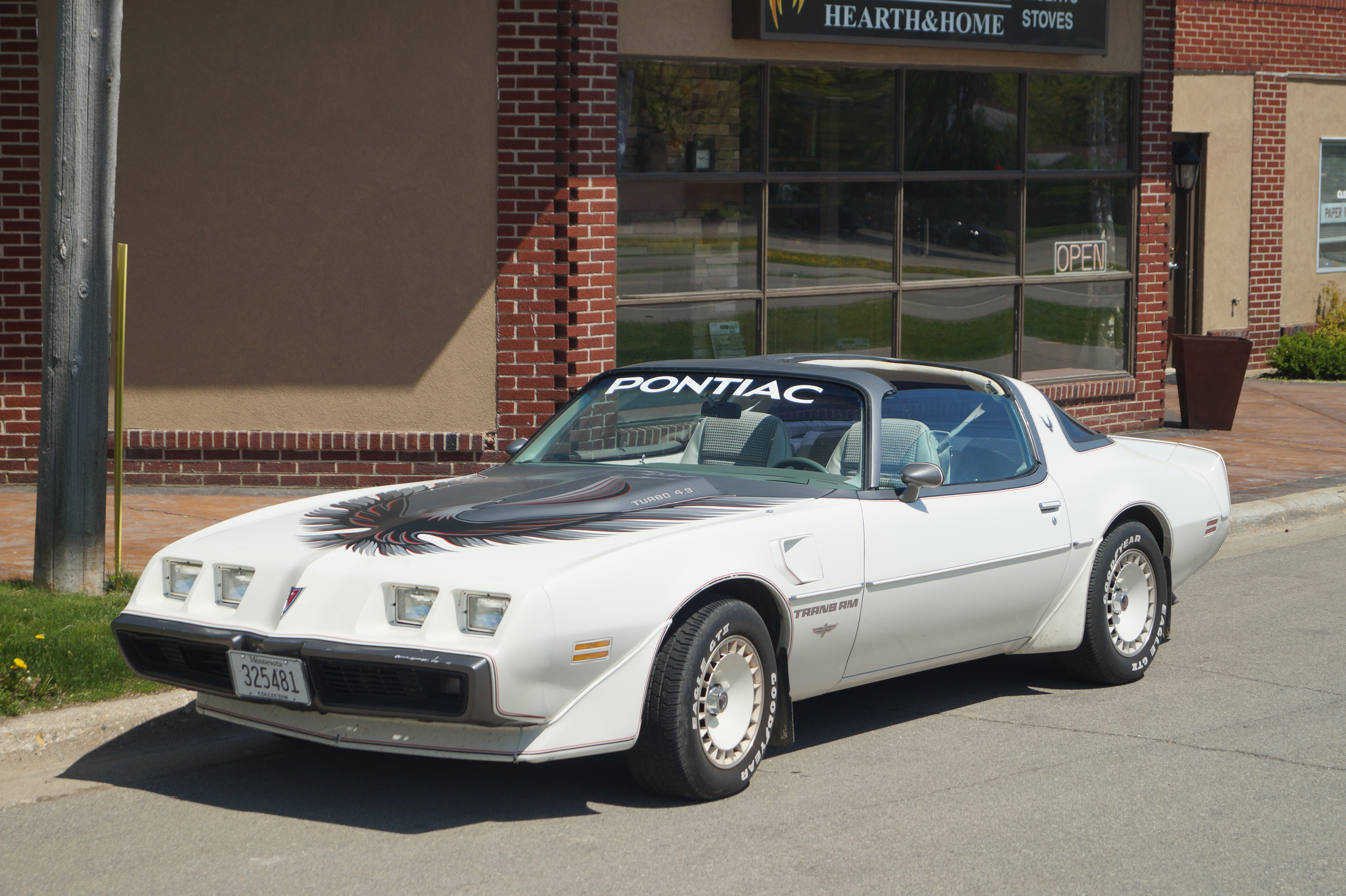
A 1980 Y85 Turbo Trans Am Indy Pace Car

The new Limited Edition Trans Am produced for 1980 was the Y85 Turbo Trans Am Pace Car that was featured in the Indianapolis 500 race series. A total of 5,700 Pace Cars were made. Standard on the Y85 included mirrored T-Tops, a special hood and paint decal that covered the hood and roof, 15x8-inch aluminum Turbo wheels, the 301 cu in (4.9 L) Turbo, the WS6 handling package, an exclusive embroidered oyster Hobnail cloth interior, a special digital AM/FM ETR stereo, power windows, Tungsten Halogen headlamps, and a leather-wrapped steering wheel. While some of the options were standard on the Y85 Pace car, many options were still extra (unlike the Y89 TATA which had all possible options standard), such as power door locks, power trunk release, tilt steering column, cruise control, etc. The "Official Pace Car" door decals were shipped alongside the car to dealers to install as per customer request or to the dealer's liking.

A 1980 Turbo Trans Am Y84 Special Edition was featured in the movie Smokey and the Bandit II, but was fitted with nitrous oxide tanks by Marvin Miller Systems to get the desired performance.

=== 1981 ===
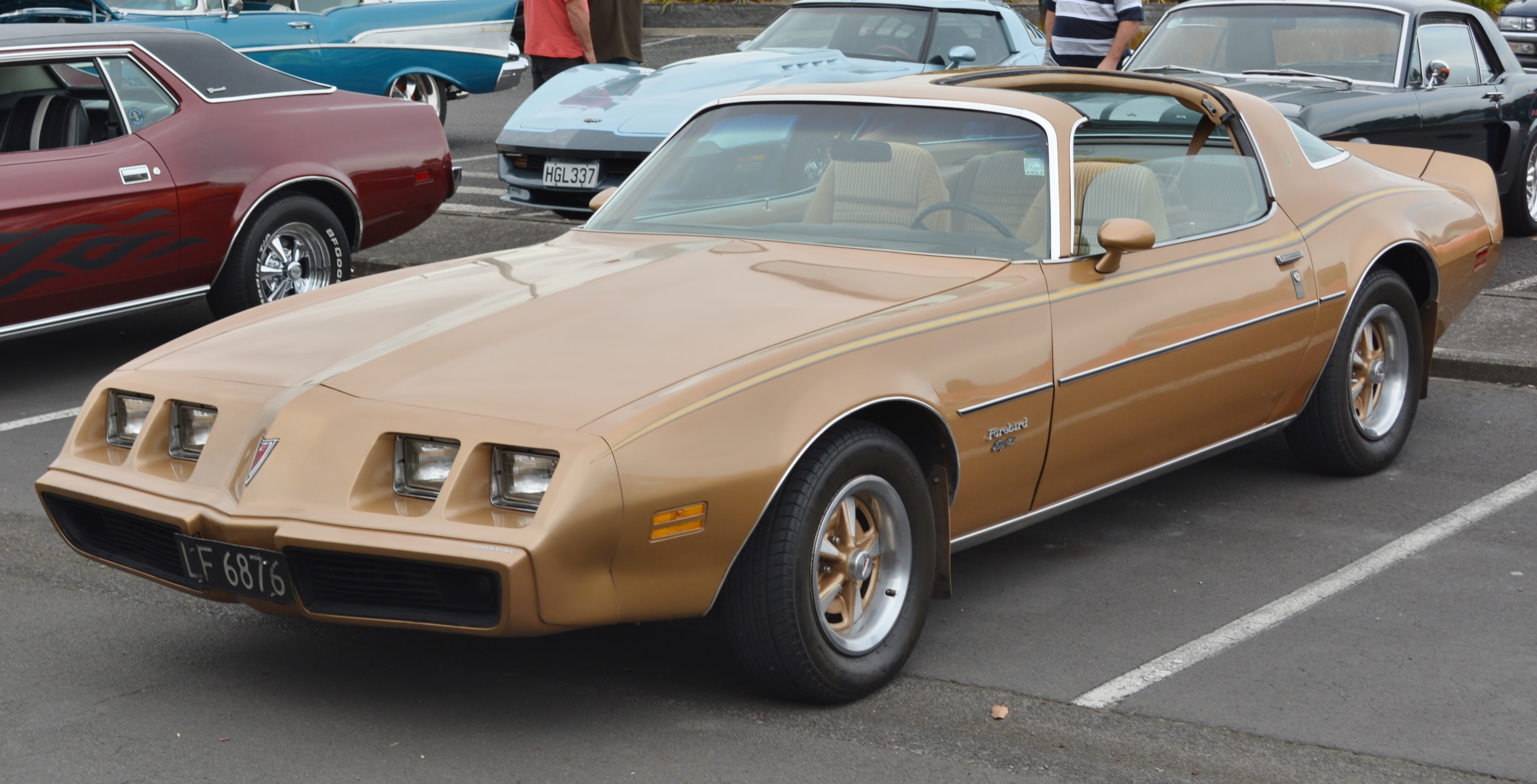
A 1981 Gold Metallic Firebird Esprit with the optional D98 Vinyl Stripe graphics

The 1981 model year became the final run for the second-generation Pontiac Firebird. The three engine options were unchanged for the model line-up, however, the option for a four-speed Borg Warner Super T-10 was re-introduced for the Formula and Trans Am, but was only available with the Chevrolet sourced LG4 305 "5.0 LITRE" V8. The W72 E/C 301 replaced the standard L37 301, so the W72 code was dropped as all 301 engines now featured the Electronic Spark Control system. The 301T became certified to pass Californian and H/A emissions requirements, making it the most powerful Pontiac engine to be sold in California since the mid-1970s, even with a slight power decrease from the previous year. As with all other General Motors vehicles for 1981, all engines came equipped with the "Computer Command Control" (CCC) system attached to the carburetor. The Canadian market and Export Firebird models slightly varied, with the Z49 Canadian delivered Firebirds not receiving any of the computer controlled carburettor systems. The Export Turbo engines received the same Power Enrichment Vacuum Regulator (PEVR) set up as the previous year. Some Canadian base model, Esprit and Formula models received the Chevrolet sourced L39 267cu V8.

The hood decal and lettering for the 1981 model year was also slightly restyled. The fender, rear spoiler and lettered decals were decreased in size. All Firebirds also received an embossed silver Firebird decal on the petrol tank cap attached to the rear taillights. On the special edition Trans Ams, this Firebird was gold. The "Turbo" wheel previously exclusive to the 301 Turbo cars now became available across the Esprit and Formula line in a slightly smaller size (15x7.5" as opposed to the WS6 Formula/Trans Am 15x8"). The interior design remained the same, with options for the seat material and color combinations slightly changing. The deluxe cloth Hobnail material being dropped for the Pimlico cloth material. Millport cloth became available as an option in limited colours for the standard interior.

The Formula received some changes for the 1981 model year, as previously in 1979-80, the two-tone W50 style paint was standard without the Formula lettering. However, if the W50 package was not ordered, the Formula simply appeared in the body color they were ordered in, with the smaller fender decals. This also prompted an increase in price for the W50 option as the decals were not included in the base Formula package anymore. In mid-1981, the Buick V6 became the standard engine in the Formula.

The G80 "Safe-T-Track" limited-slip differential that was previously standard for the last decade on all Trans Ams became a pay-extra option. This decision was made by Pontiac to prepare dealers for the new ordering and pricing for the third-generation Firebird where RPO G80 was no longer being included as a standard option for the Trans Am.

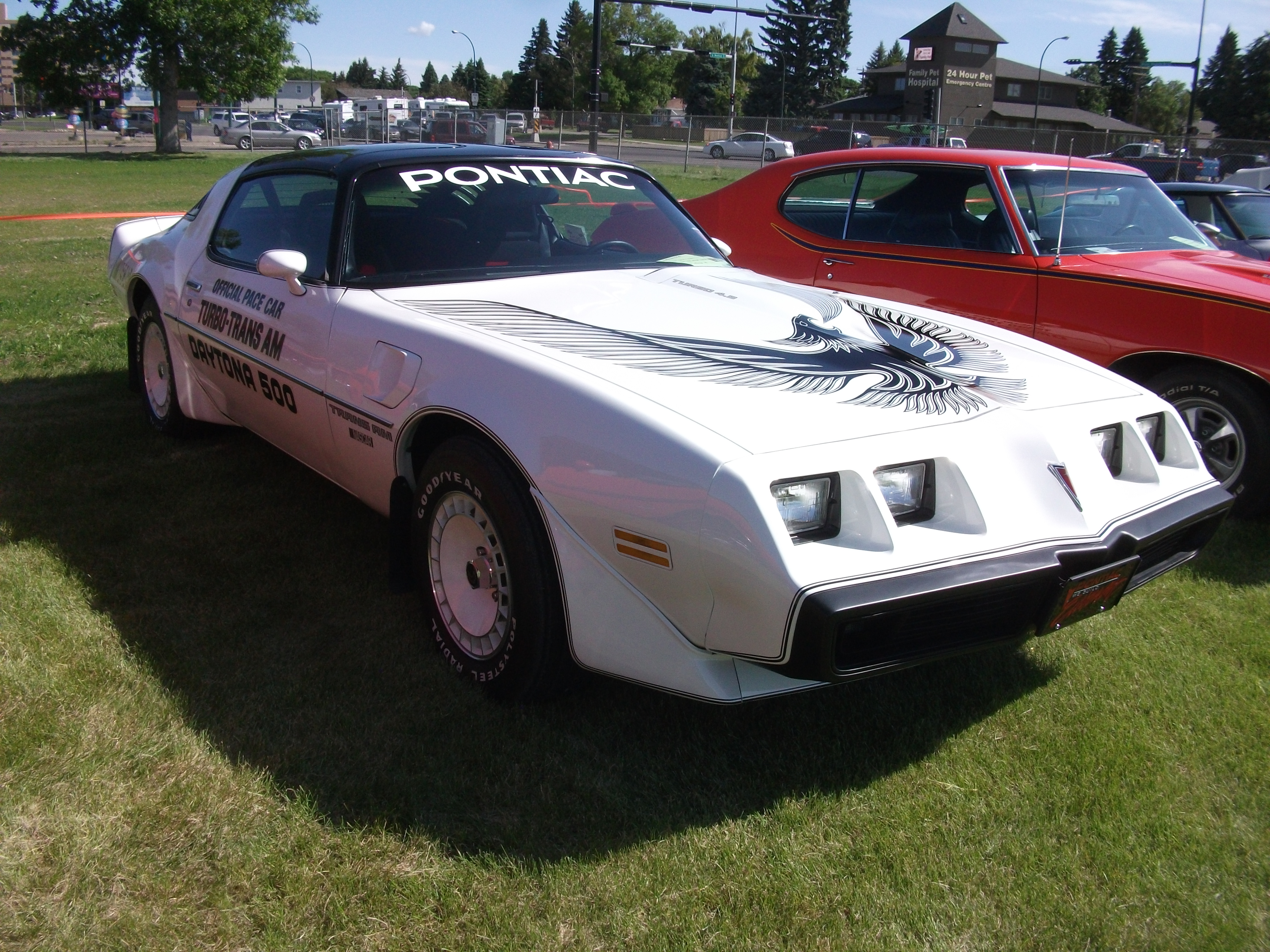
A 1981 Recaro Turbo Trans Am Pace Car

The new Limited Edition Trans Am on offer was a new iteration of the Y85 Turbo Trans Am Pace Car for the Daytona 500 race series. Instead of the grey/oyster and white color scheme from the year prior, the 1981 Pace Car featured a black and white two-tone exterior accompanied by a deluxe black and red Recaro interior with embroidered Firebirds stitched into the door panels and rear seat. It was the first production General Motors car to feature German manufactured Recaro seats and interior as factory standard equipment, however, Pontiac had used Recaro seats in prototype vehicles such as the 1978-79 Kammaback K-Type station wagon Trans Ams, as well as many dealers and tuner companies installing Recaro seats, such as DKM in the Macho Trans Ams and VSE in the Fire Ams. The Y85 for 1981 was limited to a smaller 2,000 units, and like with the Y85 in 1980, many options on the car were still extra on top of the large base cost of the Pace Car. It came standard with a Delco digital ETR AM/FM Stereo with inbuilt cassette, with an option to credit this stereo for a Delco AM/FM Stereo with inbuilt 40 channel CB radio.

=== Engines ===
1970	L22 250 cu in (4.1 L) Chevrolet I6; 155 hp (116 kW)	L30 350 cu in (5.7 L) Pontiac V8; 255 hp (190 kW)	L65 400 cu in (6.6 L) Pontiac V8; 265 hp (198 kW)	L78 400 cu in (6.6 L) Pontiac V8; 330 hp (250 kW)	L74 400 cu in (6.6 L) Pontiac Ram Air III V8; 335 hp (250 kW) (automatic); 345 hp (257 kW) (manual)	LS1 400 cu in (6.6 L) Pontiac Ram Air IV V8; 345 hp (257 kW) (automatic); 370 hp (280 kW) (manual)	
1971 (Note: In 1971, GM changed from rating brake horsepower, which is measured at the engine, to net horsepower, measured at the wheels.)	L22 250 cu in Chevrolet I6; 110 hp (82 kW)	L30 350 CID Pontiac V8; 165 hp (123 kW)	L65 400 cu in Pontiac V8; 180 hp (130 kW)	L78 400 cu in Pontiac V8; 250 hp (190 kW)	L75 455 cu in (7.5 L) Pontiac V8; 255 hp (190 kW)	LS5 455 cu in Pontiac "H.O." Ram Air IV V8; 305 hp (227 kW)	
1972	L22 250 cu in Chevrolet I6; 110 hp (82 kW)	L30 350 cu in Pontiac V8; 175 hp (130 kW)	L65 400 cu in Pontiac V8; 200 hp (150 kW)	L78 400 cu in Pontiac V8; 250 hp (190 kW)		LS5 455 cu in Pontiac "H.O." V8; 300 hp	
1973	L22 250 cu in Chevrolet I6; 100 hp (75 kW)	L30 350 cu in Pontiac V8; 150–175 hp (112–130 kW) (Note: The lower rating is for a car equipped with an automatic transmissions, the higher rating is for a car equipped with a manual transmission.)	L65 400 cu in Pontiac V8; 170–185 hp (127–138 kW)	L78 400 cu in Pontiac V8; 230 hp (170 kW)	L75 400 cu in (6.6 L) Pontiac V8; 250 hp	LS2 455 cu in Pontiac "SD" V8; 290–310 hp (220–230 kW) (Note: Early engines were rated at 310 hp but due to internal changes, primarily with the camshaft, the rating was dropped to 290 hp, these changes were made to meet emissions standards.)	
1974	L22 250 cu in Chevrolet I6; 100 hp (75 kW)	L30 350 cu in Pontiac V8; 155–170 hp (116–127 kW) (Note: The 170 hp engine was standard on the Esprit and Formula models.)	L65 400 cu in Pontiac V8; 190 hp (140 kW)	L78 400 cu in Pontiac V8; 200 hp	L75 400 cu in (6.6 L) Pontiac V8; 250 hp	LS2 455 cu in Pontiac "SD" V8; 290 hp (220 kW)	
1975	L22 250 cu in Chevrolet I6; 100 hp (75 kW)	L30 350 cu in Pontiac V8; 155 hp	L76 350 cu in Pontiac V8; 175 hp	L78 400 cu in Pontiac V8; 185 hp (138 kW)	L75 455 cu in Pontiac "H.O." V8; 200 hp (Note: Introduced midyear.)		
1976	L22 250 cu in Chevrolet I6; 100 hp (75 kW)	L30 350 cu in Pontiac V8; 160 hp (120 kW)	L76 350 cu in Pontiac V8; 165 hp (123 kW)	L78 400 cu in Pontiac V8; 185 hp (138 kW)	L75 455 cu in Pontiac "H.O." V8; 200 hp		
1977	LD5 231 cu in (3.8 L) Buick V6; 105 hp (78 kW)	L27 301 cu in (4.9 L) Pontiac V8; 135 hp (101 kW)	L76 350 cu in Pontiac V8; 170 hp (130 kW)	L34 350 cu in Oldsmobile V8; 170 hp	L78 400 cu in Pontiac V8; 180 hp (130 kW)	W72 400 cu in Pontiac V8; 200 hp	L80 403 cu in (6.6 L) Oldsmobile V8; 185 hp (138 kW)
1978	LD5 231 cu in (3.8 L) Buick V6; 105 hp (78 kW)		LG3 305 cu in (5.0 L) Chevrolet V8; 135 hp	LM1 350 cu in (5.7 L) Chevrolet V8 (Note: Chevrolet 350, VIN code "L", Buick 350, VIN code "X", and Oldsmobile 350, VIN code "R", enigines were all used.); 170 hp (130 kW)	L78 400 cu in Pontiac V8; 185 hp	W72 400 cu in Pontiac V8; 220 hp (160 kW)	L80 403 cu in (6.6 L) Oldsmobile V8; 185 hp (138 kW)
1979	LD5 231 cu in (3.8 L) Buick V6; 105 hp (78 kW)	L27 301 cu in (4.9 L) Pontiac V8; 135 hp	L37 301 cu in Pontiac V8; 150 hp	LG3 305 cu in Chevrolet V8; 135 hp or 150 hp	LM1 350 cu in Chevrolet V8; 170 hp	W72 400 cu in Pontiac V8; 220 hp (160 kW)	L80 403 cu in (6.6 L) Oldsmobile V8; 185 hp (138 kW)
1980	LD5 231 cu in (3.8 L) Buick V6; 105 hp (78 kW)	L37 301 cu in Pontiac V8; 140 hp (100 kW)	W72 301 cu in Pontiac E/C V8; 155 hp	LU8 301 cu in Pontiac Turbo V8; 210 hp (160 kW)	LG4 305 cu in Chevrolet V8; 150 hp (110 kW)		
1981	LD5 231 cu in (3.8 L) Buick V6; 105 hp (78 kW)	LS5 265 cu in (4.3 L) Pontiac V8; 140 hp (100 kW)	L37 301 cu in Pontiac E/C V8; 155 hp	LU8 301 cu in Pontiac Turbo V8; 210 hp (160 kW)	LG4 305 cu in Chevrolet V8; 150 hp (110 kW)		

=== Production totals ===
Model year	Base	Esprit	Formula	Trans Am	Total
1970	18,874	18,961	7,708	3,196	48,739
1971	23,021	20,185	7,802	2,116	53,125
1972	12,001	11,415	5,249	1,286	29,951
1973	14,096	17,249	10,166	4,802	46,313
1974	26,372	22,583	14,519	10,255	73,729
1975	22,293	20,826	13,670	27,274	84,063
1976	21,206	22,252	20,613	46,704	110,775
1977	30,642	34,548	21,801	68,744	155,735
1978	32,671	36,926	24,346	93,341	187,294
1979	38,642	30,853	24,850	117,108	211,453
1980	29,811	17,277	9,356	50,896	107,340
1981	20,541	10,938	5,927	33,493	70,899

== Third generation (1982–1992) ==
Third generation
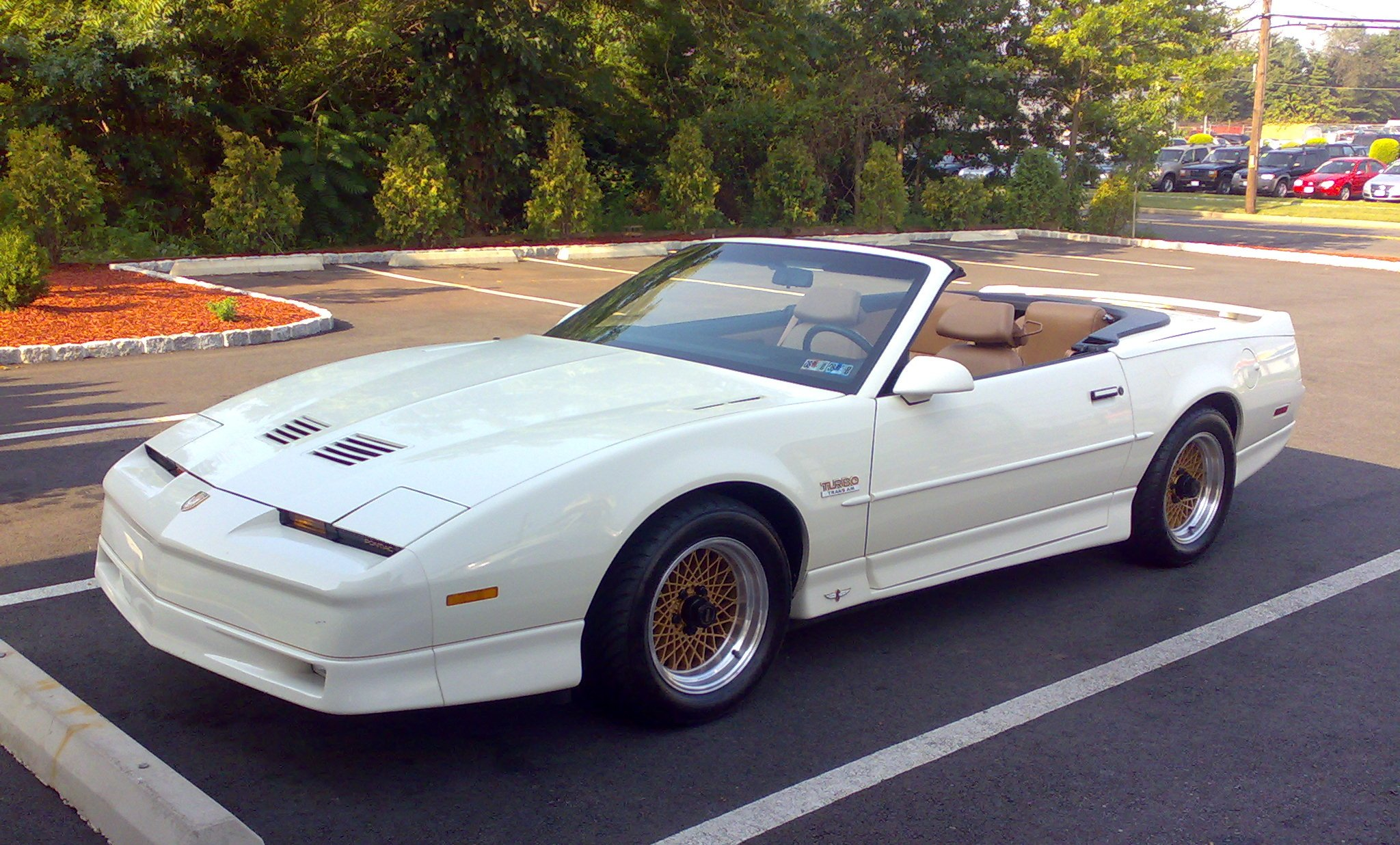
- 1989 20th Anniversary Turbo Trans Am convertible

Overview
- Production: 1982–1992
- Assembly: United States: Van Nuys, California; United States: Norwood, Ohio (1982–1987)
- Designer: Jerry Palmer, Bill Porter

Body and chassis
- Body style: 2-door liftback 2-door convertible
- Platform: F-body
- Related: Chevrolet Camaro (third generation)

Powertrain
- Engine: 151 cu in (2.5 L) Pontiac I4; 173 cu in (2.8 L) GM 60° V6; 191 cu in (3.1 L) GM 60° V6; 231 cu in (3.8 L) Buick Turbo V6; 305 cu in (5.0 L) Chevrolet V8; 350 cu in (5.7 L) Chevrolet V8
- Transmission: 3-speed automatic 4-speed automatic 4-speed manual 5-speed manual

Dimensions
- Wheelbase: 101 in (2,565 mm)
- Length: 1990–92 Firebird: 195.1 in (4,956 mm); 1990–92 Trans Am: 195.2 in (4,958 mm); Pre-1988 Firebird: 190.5 in (4,839 mm); Pre-1988 Trans Am: 191.8 in (4,872 mm)
- Width: 72.4 in (1,839 mm)
- Height: 49.7 in (1,262 mm)

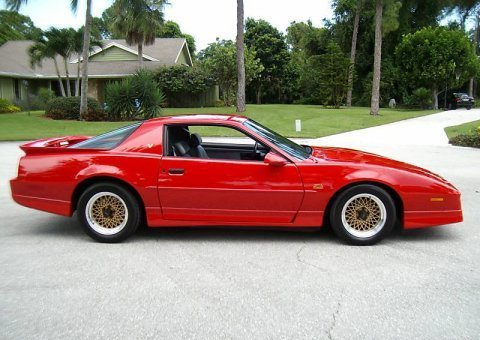
1989 Pontiac Trans Am Firebird GTA

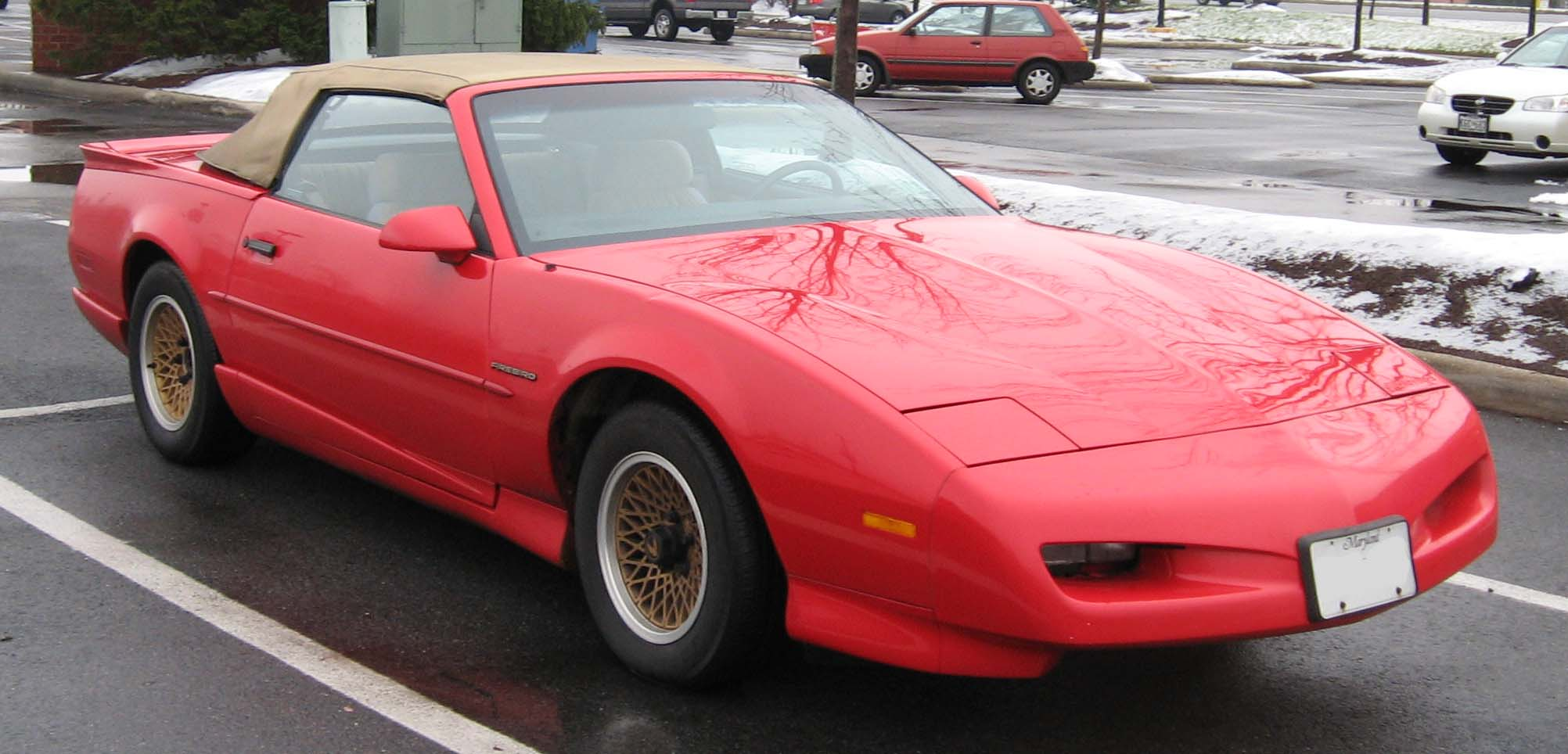
1991 Firebird convertible with restyled nose

The availability and cost of gasoline (two fuel crises had occurred by this time) meant the weight and the fuel consumption of the third generation had to be considered in the design. In F-body development, both the third-generation Firebird and Camaro were proposed as possible front-wheel-drive platforms, but the idea was scrapped. Computerized engine management was in its infancy, and with fuel efficiency being the primary objective, it was not possible to have high horsepower and torque numbers. They did manage to cut enough weight from the design so that acceleration performance would be better than the 1981 models. They also succeeded in reducing fuel consumption, offering a four-cylinder Firebird that would provide 34 miles per US gallon (6.9 L/100 km). GM executives decided that engineering effort would best be spent on aerodynamics and chassis development. They created a modern platform so that when engine technology advanced, they would have a well-balanced package with acceleration, braking, handling, and aerodynamics.

The Firebird and Camaro were completely redesigned for the 1982 model year, with the windshield slope set at 62 degrees, (about three degrees steeper than anything GM had ever tried before), and for the first time, a large, glass-dominated hatchback that required no metal structure to support it. Two concealed pop-up headlights, a first on the F-Body cars, were the primary characteristic that distinguished the third-generation Firebird from both its Camaro sibling and its prior form (a styling characteristic carried into the fourth generation's design). In addition to being about 500 pounds (230 kg) lighter than the previous design, the new design was the most aerodynamic product GM had ever released. Wind tunnels were used to form the new F-Body platform's shape, and Pontiac took full advantage of it. The aerodynamic developments extended to the finned aluminum wheels with smooth hubcaps and a functional rear spoiler.

=== Models ===
- Firebird base
- Firebird S/E (1982–1986)
- Firebird Formula (1987–1992)
- Firebird Formula Firehawk (1991–1992)
- Firebird Trans Am
- Firebird Trans Am GTA (1987–1992)

=== 1988 ===
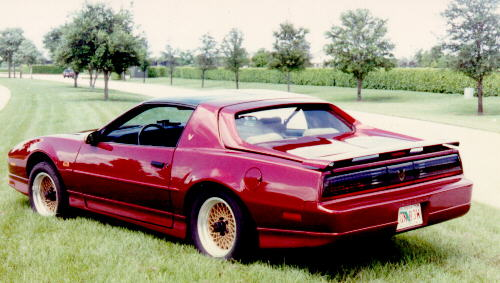
1988 Pontiac Trans Am GTA with notchback option

In 1988 the Trans Am GTA, which was built with the standard 350 cu in 5.7 L V8 engine, was offered with the option of the removable roof "T-tops". However, any buyer ordering this option could only order the 305 cu in 5.0 L V8 engine, because the roof did not have the support for all the extra torque from the engine, requiring a power trade-off for those who wanted this option. Pontiac also introduced a rare option for the Trans Am GTA in the 1988 model year, the $800 (~$2,178 in 2025) "notchback", which replaced the standard long large, glass-dominated hatchback to make the Firebird design look less like the Camaro design, and shared an appearance with the Pontiac Fiero. The notchback was a special fiberglass rear deck lid, replacing the long-sloped window with a short vertical rear window, resembling the back of a Ferrari 288 GTO.

A total of 718 of these Notchbacks were built in 1988. The promotion was only in the form of a sheet in the back of a notebook of available options. They were made by Auto-Fab of Auburn Hills, Michigan. Problems with the incorrect fitting of the notchbacks to the GTAs at the Van Nuys plant often resulted in delays of several months for buyers who wanted this option. Furthermore, quality control problems plagued the notchback, many owners complained of rippling and deforming of the fiberglass rear deck, and others complained of large defects resembling acne forming in the notchbacks. Pontiac had to repair them under warranty, sanding down the imperfections, and repainting them, only to have more flaws resurface months later. Because of the poor quality and numerous expensive warranty repairs and repainting, the notchback was subsequently canceled for the 1989 model year, via a bulletin in August 1988, although production records indicate that a few were produced.

=== 1989 ===
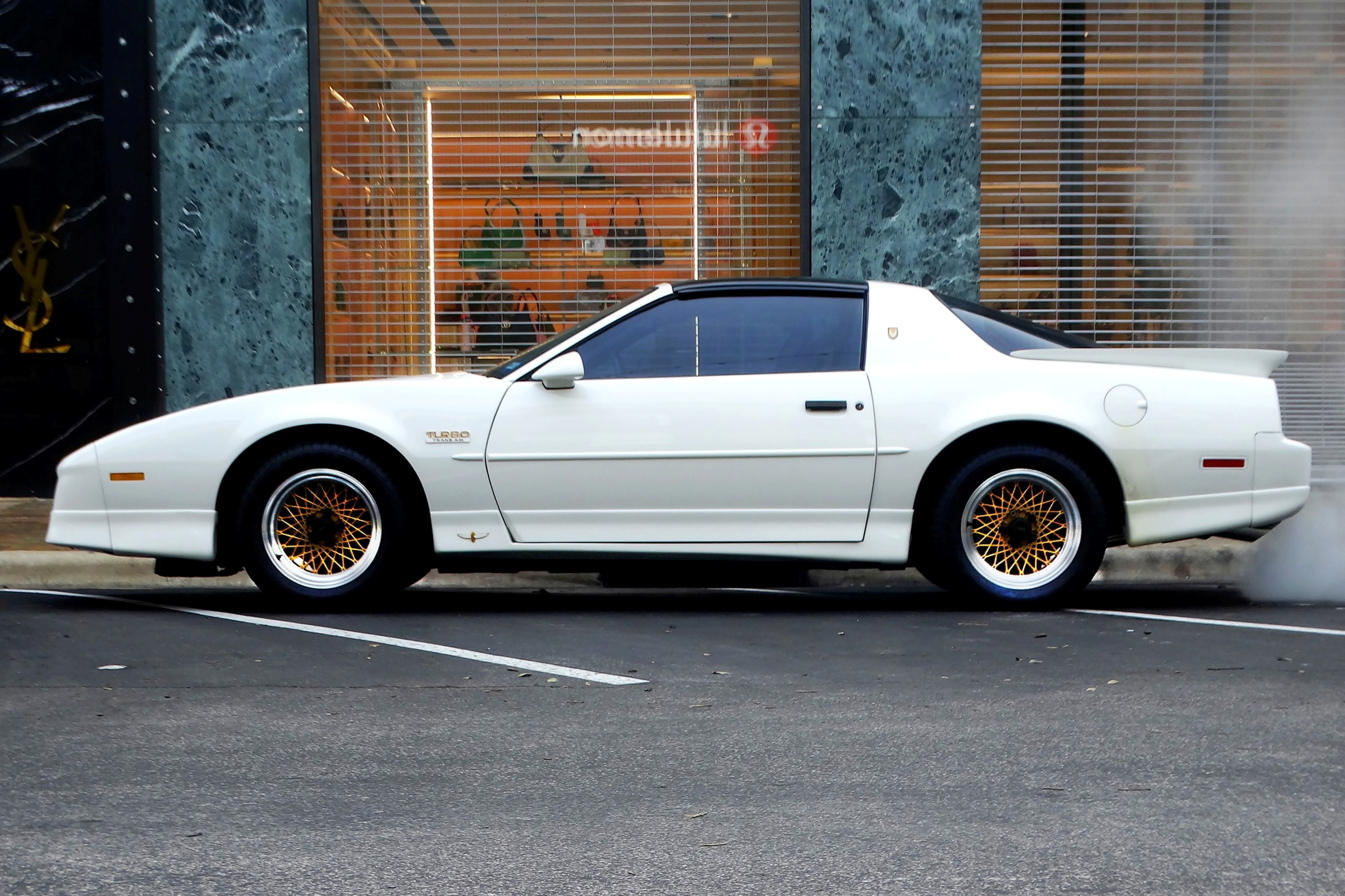
1989 Pontiac Firebird Turbo Trans Am

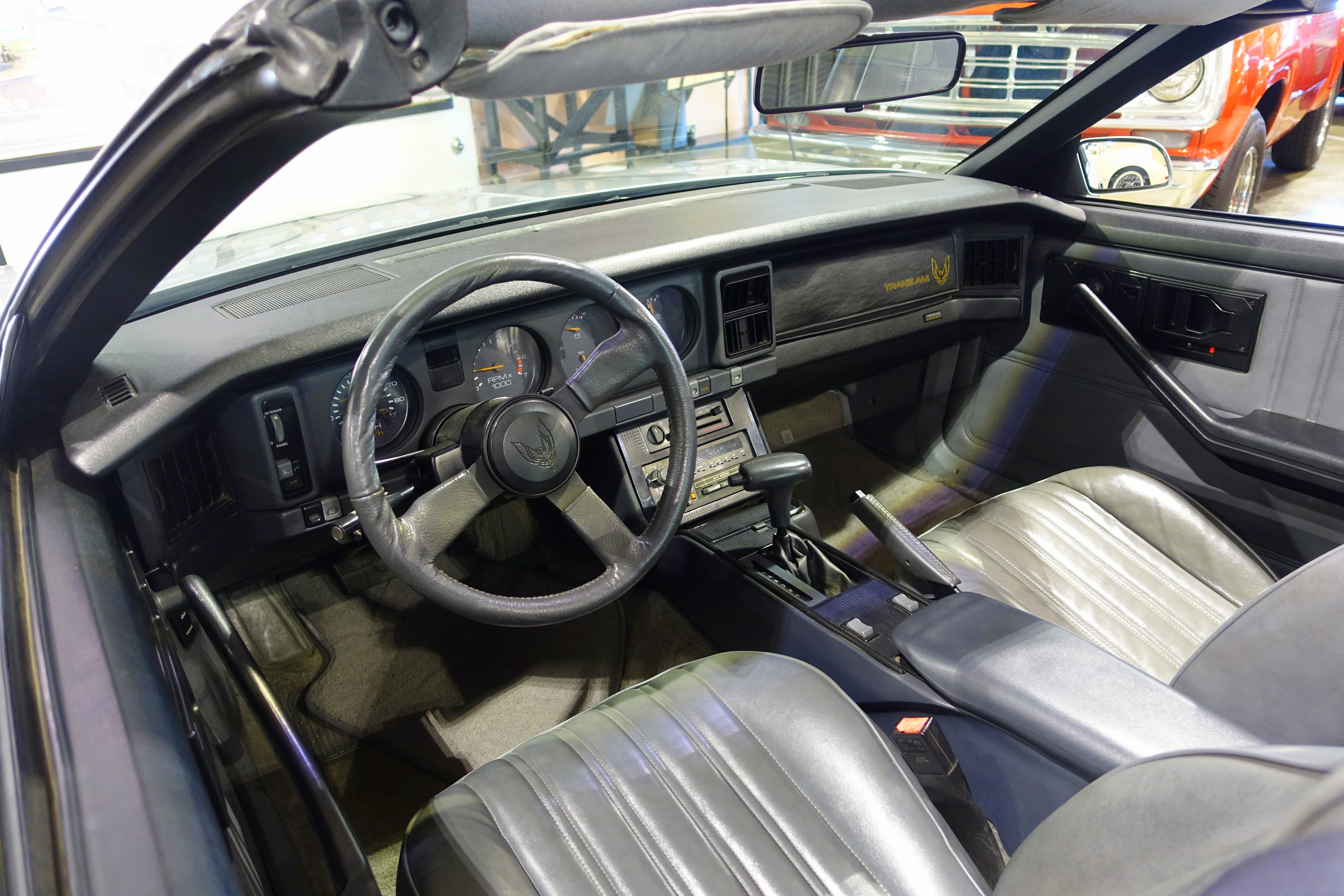
1985 Pontiac Firebird Trans Am interior

For 1989, most Firebird models were nearly identical to those made in 1988. The Trans-Am GTA and Formula 350 models were fitted with upgraded C4 Corvette 5.7 Liter L98 Engines, replacing the 5.7 Liter L98 engine version that powered the 1987 and 1988 models. The L98 was not a factory option on the non-GTA version of the Trans Am in 1989, which was downgraded to only feature the 5.0 Liter LB9 Engine. The Formula and GTA models sold with manual transmissions all featured the LB9 engines as well.

In 1989, Pontiac made a limited edition 20th Anniversary Turbo Trans Am, which was the Indianapolis 500 Pace Car that year. The 20th Anniversary model featured the 3.8-liter turbocharged Buick engine used in the 1987 GNX, with two modifications: re-engineered cylinder heads (because the F-Body had less engine room than the G-body) with 8:1 instead of 9:1 compression, and upgraded turbocharger components that provided extra boost (16 psi vs. 14 psi for the Buick GNX). The Turbo Trans Am came with a 5-year 50,000-mile warranty rather than the 12-month 12,000-mile warranty that applied to the Buick GNX. Though officially rated at 250 hp (186 kW) and 340 lb⋅ft (461 N⋅m), dynamometer testing of the 20th Anniversary model tests regularly recorded over 300 horsepower. Hagerty reported that the Turbo Trans Am was 0.1 second faster than the GNX in both 0-60 mph and 1/4-mile tests.

The 20th Anniversary Trans Am also featured Chevrolet's high-performance 'police-Camaro' 1LE brakes, and it was the first Indy-500 Pace Car that did not require an engine, suspension, and other performance upgrades and modifications to handle Pace Car duties at Indianapolis.

The 20th Anniversary Trans Am was the last 'anniversary' model to feature more than a custom interior and special exterior paint trim.

=== 1990 ===
For the 1990 model year, a driver-side airbag was made standard and the Firebird interior received a redesign.

=== Engines ===
1982	LQ9 2.5 L (151 cu in) GM EFI I4; 90 hp (67 kW)	LC1 2.8 L (173 cu in) Chevrolet V6; 102 hp (76 kW)	LG4 5.0 L (305 cu in) Chevrolet V8; 145 hp (108 kW)	LU5 Crossfire EFI 5.0 L Chevrolet V8; 165 hp (123 kW)		
1983	LQ9 2.5 L GM EFI I4; 92 hp (69 kW)	LC1 2.8 L Chevrolet V6; 107 hp (80 kW)	LL1 2.8 L "HO" Chevrolet V6; 135 hp (101 kW)	LG4 5.0 L Chevrolet V8; 150 hp (112 kW)	LU5 5.0 L Chevrolet Crossfire EFI V8; 175 hp (130 kW)	L69 5.0 L "HO" Chevrolet V8; 190 hp (142 kW)
1984	LQ9 2.5 L GM EFI I4; 92 hp (69 kW)	LC1 2.8 L Chevrolet V6; 125 hp (93 kW)	LL1 2.8 L "HO" Chevrolet V6; 135 hp (101 kW)	LG4 5.0 L Chevrolet V8; 150 hp (112 kW)	L69 5.0 L "HO" Chevrolet V8; 190 hp (142 kW)	
1985	LQ9 2.5 L GM EFI I4; 88 hp (66 kW)	LB8 2.8 L Chevrolet EFI V6; 135 hp (101 kW)	LG4 5.0 L Chevrolet V8; 155 hp (116 kW)	L69 5.0 L "HO" Chevrolet V8; 190 hp (142 kW)	LB9 5.0 L Chevrolet tuned port injection V8; 205 hp (153 kW)	
1986	LQ9 2.5 L GM EFI I4; 88 hp (66 kW)(none produced in 1986)	LB8 2.8 L Chevrolet EFI V6; 135 hp (101 kW)	LG4 5.0 L Chevrolet V8; 165 hp (123 kW)	L69 5.0 L "HO" Chevrolet V8; 190 hp (142 kW)	LB9 5.0 L Chevrolet tuned port injection V8; 190 hp (142 kW)|	
1987	LB8 2.8 L Chevrolet EFI V6; 135 hp (101 kW)	LG4 5.0 L Chevrolet V8; 155 hp (116 kW)	LB9 5.0 L Chevrolet tuned port injection V8, automatic 190 hp (142 kW)	LB9 5.0 L Chevrolet tuned port injection V8, manual 215 hp (160 kW)	L98 5.7 L Chevrolet tuned port injection V8; 210 hp (160 kW)	
1988	LB8 2.8 L Chevrolet EFI V6; 135 hp (101 kW)	LO3 5.0 L Chevrolet V8; 170 hp (127 kW)	LB9 5.0 L Chevrolet tuned port injection V8, automatic 195 hp (145 kW)	LB9 5.0 L Chevrolet tuned port injection V8, manual 220 hp (164 kW)	L98 5.7 L Chevrolet tuned port injection V8; 225 hp (168 kW)	
1989	LB8 2.8 L Chevrolet multi port fuel injection V6; 135 hp (101 kW)	L03 5.0 L Chevrolet throttle body injection V8; 170 hp (127 kW)	LB9 5.0 L Chevrolet tuned port injection V8, automatic 195 hp (145 kW)	LB9 5.0 L Chevrolet tuned port injection V8, manual 220 hp (164 kW)	L98 5.7 L (350 cu in) Chevrolet tuned port injection V8; 225 hp (168 kW)	L98 5.7 L (350 cu in) Chevrolet tuned port injection V8 w/dual cats N10 option 235 hp (175 kW)
1989				LB9 5.0 L Chevrolet tuned port injection V8, manual w/dual cats N10 option 230 hp (172 kW)		LC2 Buick 3.8 L turbocharged V6; 250 hp (186 kW)

== Fourth generation (1993–2002) ==
Fourth generation
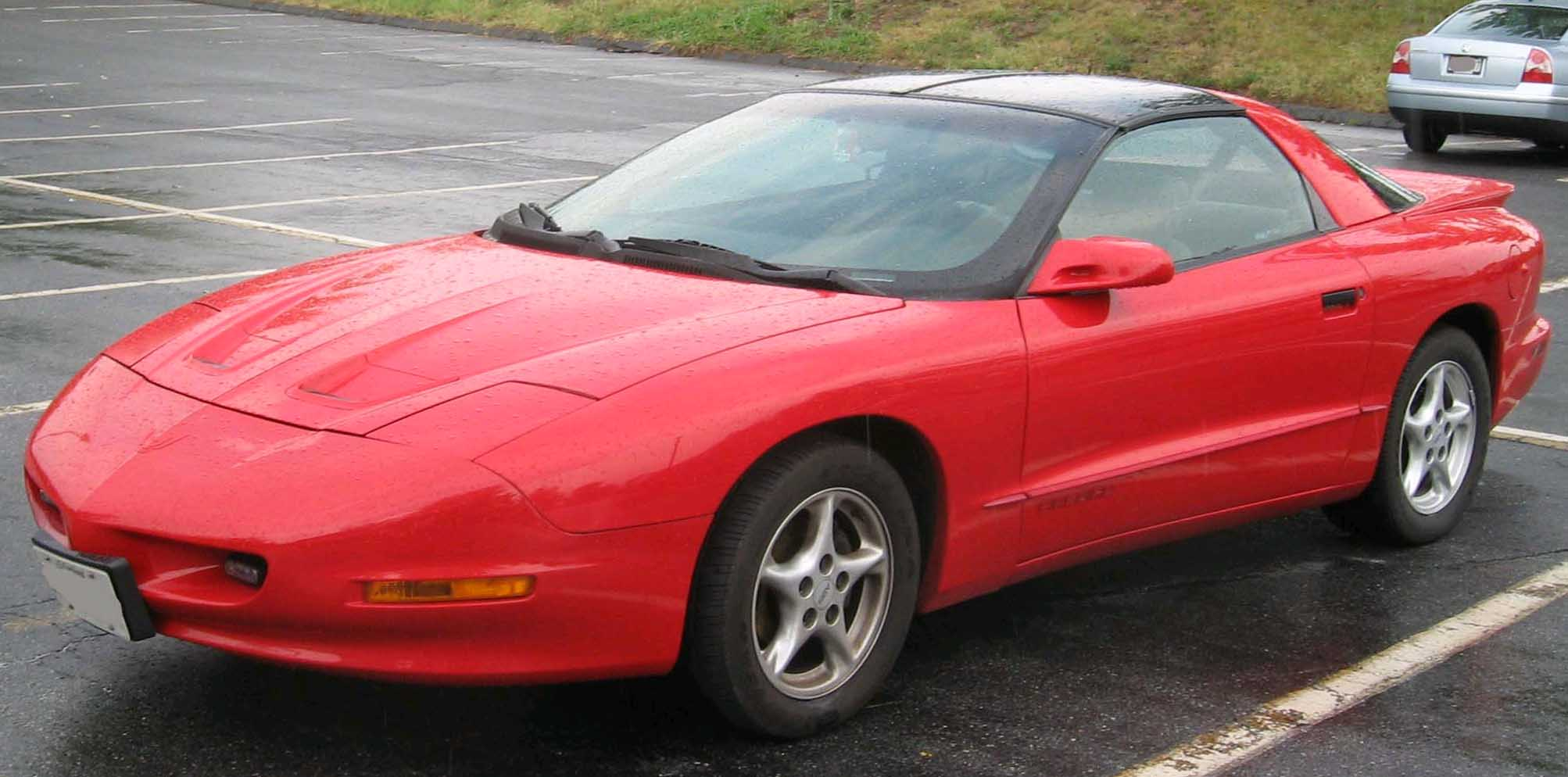
- 1993–1997 Pontiac Firebird

Overview
- Production: November 1992 – August 30, 2002
- Model years: 1993–2002
- Assembly: Canada: Sainte-Thérèse, Quebec (Sainte-Thérèse Assembly)
- Designer: John Folden

Body and chassis
- Body style: 2-door liftback 2-door convertible
- Platform: F-body
- Related: Chevrolet Camaro (fourth generation)

Powertrain
- Engine: 207 cu in (3.4 L) L32 V6 (160 hp); 231 cu in (3.8 L) L36 V6 (205 hp); 350 cu in (5.7 L) LT1 V8 (275-305 hp); 350 cu in (5.7 L) LT4 V8 (330 hp); 346 cu in (5.7 L) LS1 V8 (305-330 hp); 346 cu in (5.7 L) SLP Firehawk LS1 V8 (345-350 hp)
- Transmission: THM 4L60 4-speed automatic (1993); THM 4L60E 4-speed automatic (1994–2002); Borg Warner T-5 5-speed manual (V6 engine); Borg Warner T56 6-speed manual (V8 engine)

Dimensions
- Wheelbase: 101.1 in (2,568 mm)
- Length: 1993–1997 Firebird: 195.6 in (4,968 mm); 1998–2002 Firebird: 193.3 in (4,910 mm); 1993–1997 Trans Am: 197 in (5,004 mm); 1998–1999 Trans Am: 193.8 in (4,923 mm); 2000–2002 Trans Am: 193.7 in (4,920 mm)
- Width: 1993–1997: 74.5 in (1,892 mm); 1998–2002: 74.4 in (1,890 mm)
- Height: 1993–1999 Firebird 52 in (1,321 mm); 2000–2002 Firebird: 51.2 in (1,300 mm); 1993–1995 Trans Am: 51.7 in (1,313 mm); 1996–1999 Trans Am: 52 in (1,321 mm); 2000–2002 Trans Am: 51.8 in (1,316 mm); 1993–1999 Firebird convertible: 52.7 in (1,339 mm); 2000–2002 Firebird convertible 51.8 in (1,316 mm); 1994–1999 Trans Am convertible: 52.4 in (1,331 mm)
- Curb weight: 3,440 lb (1,560 kg) (5.7 L LT1 coupe); 3,284 lb (1,490 kg) (5.7 L LS1 coupe)

The fourth-generation Firebird amplified the aerodynamic styling initiated by the previous generation. While the live rear axle and floorpan aft of the front seats remained largely the same, ninety percent of the Firebird's parts were all-new. Overall, the styling of the Firebird more strongly reflected the Banshee IV concept car than the 1991 "facelift" did. As with the Camaro, major improvements included standard dual airbags, four-wheel anti-lock brakes, 16-inch wheels, rack-and-pinion power steering, short/long-arm front suspension, and several non-rusting composite body panels. Throughout its fourth generation, trim levels included the V6-powered Firebird, V8-powered Formula, and Trans Am. Standard manual transmissions were the T5 five-speed manual for the V6s, Borg-Warner′s T56 six-speed manual for the V8s. The 4L60 four-speed automatic was optional for both in 1993, becoming the 4L60E with built-in electronic controls in 1994.

=== 1993–1997 ===
From 1993 until 1995 (1995 non-California cars), Firebirds received a 160 hp (119 kW) 3.4 L V6, an enhanced version of the third-generation's 3.1 L V6. Beginning mid-year 1995 onward, a Series II 3.8 L V6 with 200 hp (149 kW) became the Firebird's sole engine. From 1993 until 1997, the sole engine for the Formula and Trans Am was the 5.7 L LT1 V8, essentially identical to the LT1 in the C4 Corvette except for more flow-restrictive intake and exhaust systems. Steering wheel audio controls were included with optional uplevel cassette or compact disc stereo systems.

Beginning with 1994 model year cars, "Delco 2001"-series stereo systems replaced the previous Delco units. This revised series, also introduced for other Pontiac car lines, featured ergonomically designed control panels with larger buttons and an optional seven-band graphic equalizer. Also in 1994, the fourth-generation convertible was available; every Firebird (and Camaro) convertible featured a glass rear window with a built-in electric defroster.

The 1995 models were the same as those of previous years, but traction control (ASR: acceleration slip regulation) was available for LT1 Firebirds, controlled by a switch on the console. The steering wheels in all Firebirds were also changed; their optional built-in audio controls were more closely grouped on each side. The "Trans Am GT" trim level was dropped from the lineup after its model year run in 1994. For 1995, all Trans Ams received 155-mph speedometers and Z-rated tires. 1995 was also the first year of the vented version of the Opti-Spark distributors on LT1 F-cars, addressing a common mechanical fault with the unit. The 'transmission perform' button was available only in the 1994 and 1995 Formula and Trans Am. This option was stopped for the 1996 and later models, but the unused connections remain available for the 1996 and 1997 Formula and Trans Am. While 1995 cars still used the OBD-I (on-board diagnostic) computer system (the last year of any American car including the F-body to use OBD-I), a majority of them had OBD-II connector ports under the dash.

Firebird performance levels improved for 1996, with the establishment of the stronger 200-hp 3.8 L V6 as the new base engine, and the power rating of the LT1 increased to 285 for 1996, due to its new dual catalytic-converter exhaust system. 1996 was also the first model year of the OBD-II computer system. Optional performance enhancements were available for each Firebird trim level; the Y87 performance packages for V6s added mechanical features of the V8 setups, such as four-wheel disc brakes, faster-response steering, limited-slip rear differential, and dual tailpipes. For Formulas and Trans Ams, functional dual-inlet "Ram Air" hoods returned as part of the WS6 performance package. The optional package boosted rated horsepower from 285 to 305, and torque from 325 lb·ft to 335. Also included were 17x9-inch wheels with 275/40ZR17 tires, suspension improvements, oval-shaped dual tailpipe tips, and a WS6 badge. Bilstein shocks was a further option with the package.

The 1997 model year introduced standard air conditioning, daytime running lamps (utilizing the front turn signal lamps), a digital odometer, and optional 500-watt Monsoon cassette or compact disc stereo systems to all Firebird trim levels. For V6 Firebirds, a W68 sport appearance package was also introduced as a counterpart to the Camaro RS trim level. The WS6 "Ram Air" performance package was now also an option for the Formula and Trans Am convertibles, although these convertibles did not receive the 17-inch wheel-and-tire combination. There were 41 Formula convertibles and 463 Trans Am convertibles produced from 1996 until 1997 with the WS6 package.

=== 1998–2002 ===
In 1997, in relation to the Camaro, the Firebird received a mid-cycle refresh for the 1998 model year. Major changes included a new hood and front fascia with dual intakes, retracting quad halogen headlights, circular turn signals and fog lamps, a front license plate pocket, lower fender air vents, unified-style lower door raised lettering for each trim level, and a new "honeycomb" rear light panel, with circular reverse lamps. In the dashboard, "next-generation" reduced-force dual airbags became standard. As before, the Formula and Trans Am again received a close derivative of the Corvette's 5.7 L V8, the LS1 of the C5 Corvette, as the LT1 (and LT4) V8s were discontinued. The LS1 Firebirds were also equipped with an aluminum driveshaft, replacing the previous steel version, while all Firebird trim levels gained four-wheel disc brakes with dual-piston front calipers and larger rotors at each wheel, complete with a solenoid-based Bosch anti-lock system. The Formula convertible was no longer offered.

Beginning in 1998 for 1999 models, a standard 16.8-gallon non-metallic fuel tank increased the potential traveling range. GM's ASR traction control system was extended to the V6-powered Firebirds, and all LS1 (V8) and Y87 (V6) Firebirds also received a Zexel/Torsen II slip-reduction rear axle. An electronic brakeforce distribution (EBD) system replaced the old hydraulic proportioning valve for improved brake performance. An enhanced sensing and diagnostic module (SDM) recorded vehicle speed, engine rpm, throttle position, and brake use in the last five seconds prior to airbag deployment. In 1999, a Hurst shifter for variants with the 6-speed manual and a power steering cooler became options for LS1 Firebirds.

In 2000, the WS6 performance package was available exclusively for the 2001 model year Trans Am coupe and convertible variants.

In 2002, more convenience items such as power mirrors and power antennae became standard equipment, while cassette stereos were phased out.

=== Firehawk ===
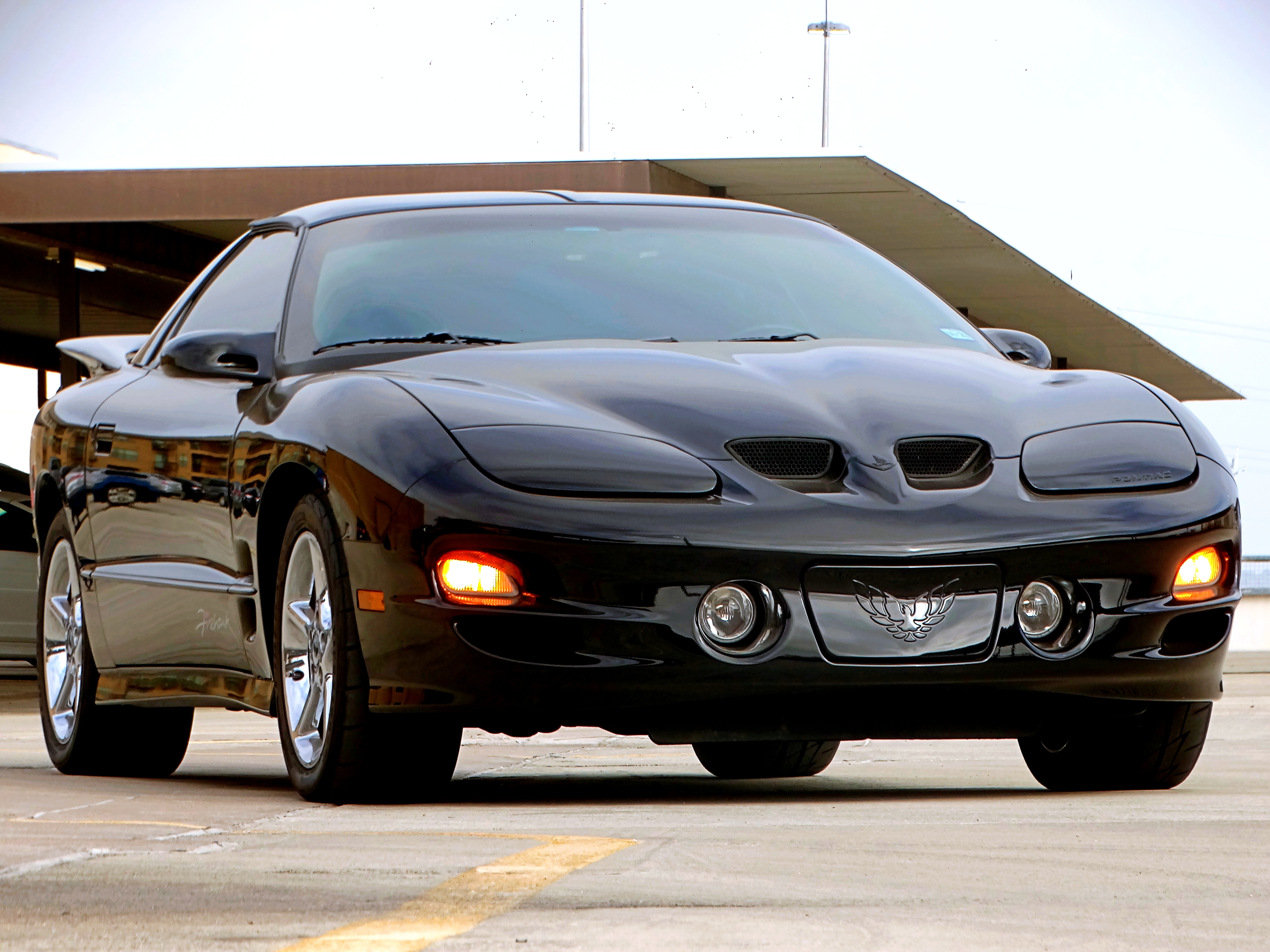

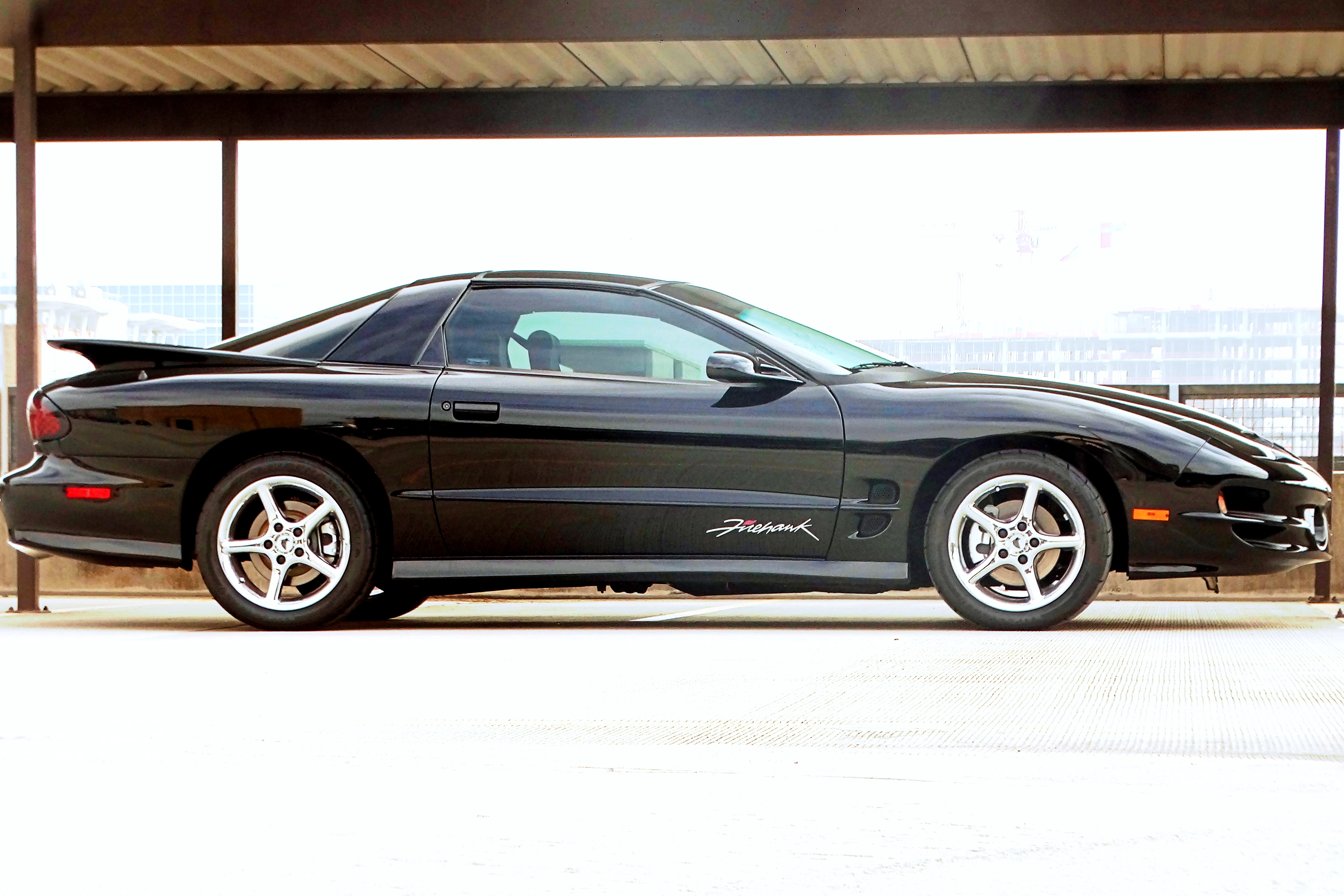
2001 Pontiac Firebird Trans Am Firehawk

The Firehawk was first sold as a production vehicle in 1992. The 1992 Firehawk models were modified Formula 350s with major engine, intake, suspension, and other upgrades, including the Chevrolet Corvette ZR-1's 6-speed transmission. Producing over 350 HP (269 KW) and 390 lb-ft of torque (526 N-m), they were the fastest and most powerful regular production Firebirds ever made available through Pontiac dealers (RPO code: B4U). The special modifications were done by SLP (Street Legal Performance) Engineering, in Tom's River, New Jersey. Those performance upgrades pushed the price to $40,000 (and there was an extra special street racing upgrade for another $10,000, which included the same brakes used on the Ferrari F40). Consequently, only 25 of the 'regular' Firehawks were sold, and only 2 of the race models were sold during the 1992 model year, making the 1992 Firehawk an extremely rare vehicle. The 1992 models are the only 3rd-generation F-Body Firehawks.

The special-edition extra-performance Firehawk (available in Formula trim for 1993–1997, and again in both Formula and Trans Am trims for 1999–2002) was produced by SLP Engineering, Inc., and sold through Pontiac dealerships. Featuring 17-inch wheels with namesake Firestone Firehawk 275/40ZR17 tires along with a functional twin-inlet hood above a specific air cleaner box, its rated power increased to 300 hp (224 kW) and 330 lb·ft (445 Nm) of torque. A total of 201 Firehawks were built in 1993. In 1994, the Firehawk package was expanded to include options for a suspension upgrade as well as a larger-diameter exhaust system that increased power to 315 hp (235 kW). T-top Formula coupes and convertibles could also be optioned as Firehawks beginning in 1995. For 1996 and 1997, the Firehawk gained rectangular driving lights mounted inside the front scoops and (except for Firehawk convertibles) the Trans Am's elevated rear wing. In 1997, an LT4 Firehawk was also available, utilizing the same 330 hp (246 kW), balanced-and-blueprinted LT4 V8 engine as found in the manual-transmission 1996 Corvette. A total of 29 LT4-powered Firehawks were produced.

Power levels for the 1999 Firehawk, powered by the LS1 V8, rose to 327 hp (244 kW) (330 in 2000, 335 in 2001, and 345 in late 2002 models equipped with the "Blackwing" intake). A 10th-anniversary Firehawk was available in 2001, distinguished as a black Trans Am coupe (123 units) and convertible (16 units) with gold-painted hood stripes (prototype only), gold vinyl stripes on hood and spoiler (production), gold 17-inch wheels, and gold tailpipe tips.

=== 1994 Trans Am GT ===
In 1994 only, a "Trans Am GT" option was available. Trans Am GTs did not receive any special badging, graphics, or emblems, and looked externally identical to the base Trans Am cars. The GT package included 245/50ZR16 tires and a 155-mph speedometer. Non-GT optioned Trans Ams in 1994 received 235/55R16 tires, a 115-mph speedometer, and a much lower top-speed limiter. The "highrise spoiler", leather, and T-tops were not standard on the Trans Am GT cars in 1994, nor any year of the LT1 Trans Am. RPO code T43 "uplevel spoiler" was an option on all Trans Ams, and while the mass majority of 1994 Trans Am GT cars received the T43 spoiler (along with the majority of all 1993–1997 Trans Ams), it was not part of the Trans Am GT package. Both base Trans Ams and Trans am GTs could be ordered as a coupe, T-top, or convertible versions and were both available with automatic or manual transmissions. While the GT package was a cost option on the 1994 Trans Am, a majority of 1994 Trans Ams were made with the GT package.

All of the 1994 Trans Am GT options became standard in 1995–2002 as part of the Trans Am package, and the GT name/package was dropped for 1995. Some of the early fourth-generation Trans Am and Formula Firebirds list "GT" on the vehicle's title or registration. The reason is that the VIN does not specify a "package" (Formula, Trans Am, Trans Am GT, Firehawk, etc.); it only specifies the engine (5.7 L V8 LT1). Because the title is based on the VIN alone, titles and registrations often list all of the packages, but it does not mean the car is equipped with any certain package.

=== 1994 25th-anniversary Trans Am ===
The 1994 model year marked the 25th anniversary of the Trans Am, and another anniversary edition was released, painted white with a single dark blue stripe down the center of the vehicle that was reminiscent of the 1970 Trans Am. It also featured white-painted, five-spoke, 16-inch alloy wheels, white leather seats, and door trim. This edition was available in either coupe, T-top, or convertible form.

=== 1999 30th-anniversary Trans Am ===
As with the previous 25th-anniversary edition, the 30th-anniversary edition was either a white WS6 convertible or WS6 T-top coupe, with twin dark blue stripes from hood to tail, and distinct blue anodized five-spoke 17-inch alloy A-mold wheels, with white leather seats and door trim.

2001 was the 75th anniversary of Pontiac. A 75th-anniversary package incorporated a power and performance package that included power door locks including retained accessory power, power windows including express down drivers side, dual power sport mirrors, and power antenna. Radio, ETR AM/FM stereo with CD player and 7-band graphic equalizer including a clock, seek up/down, remote CD pre-wiring Monsoon 500-watt peak power with 10-speaker premium sound system and steering wheel leather-wrapped w/driver touch radio controls. 4-speed automatic transmission, power drivers 6-way seat, security package (includes theft-deterrent system and remote key-less entry), 3800 performance package that included 3.42 gears with "posi-trac" Zexel Torsen T2 limited-slip differential, 4-wheel disc brakes, dual mufflers, and an LS1 steering rack= 14.4:1, 235/55/16 tires, hatch roof, removable, 16-inch chromed aluminum wheels, 50-state low emission vehicle. There were a total of 472 of these packages sold in 2001, No. 239 on the L36 Firebird, 231 on the Formula W66 coupe, 5 on Formula Firehawks, and 2 on Trans-Ams. The manufacturer original window stickers included this as a separate package listing the items and one price.

=== 2002 collector's edition Trans Am ===
For the Firebird's final year, a collector's edition Trans Am was released as either a yellow WS6 convertible or WS6 T-top coupe, with twin black stripes from hood to tail, black-painted five-spoke 17-inch alloy wheels, and further black-trimmed body details.

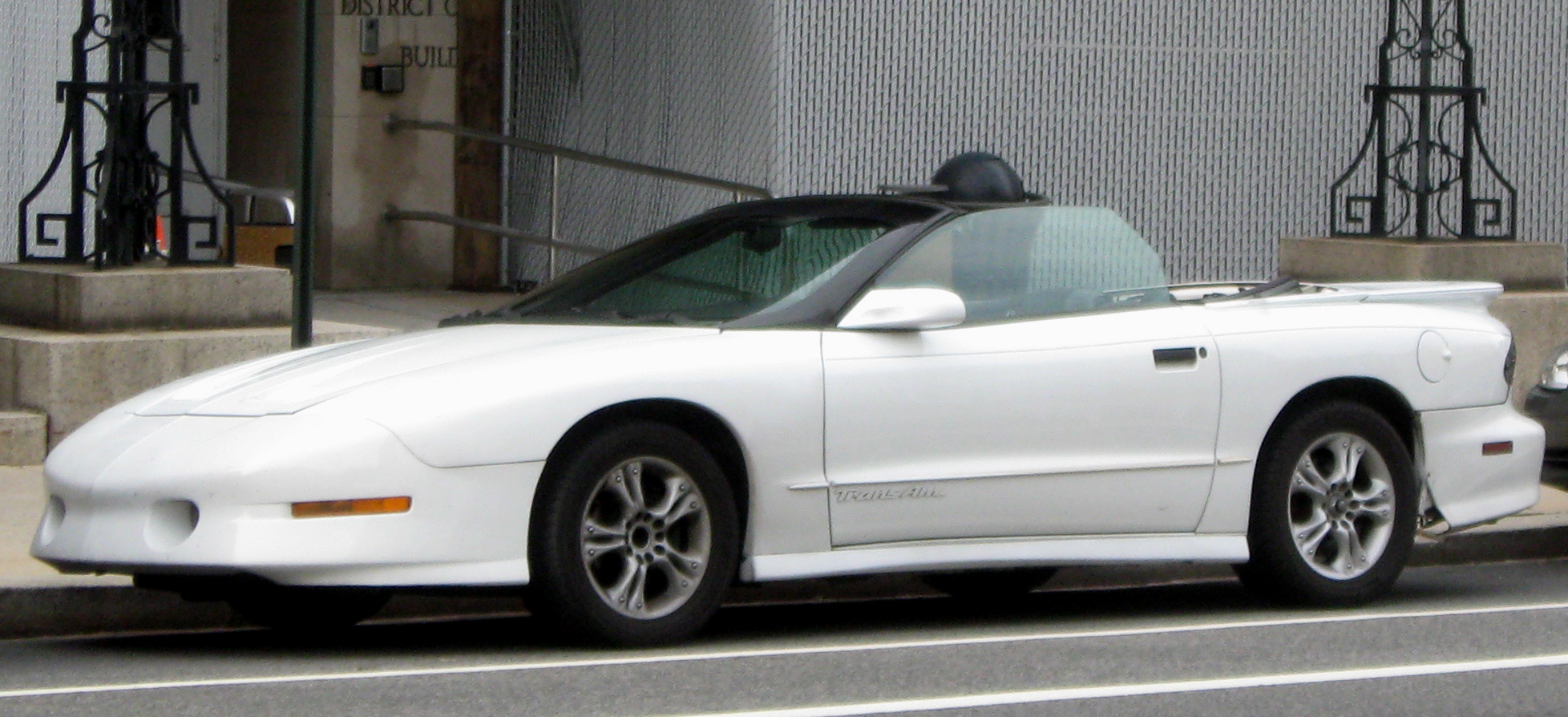
1994–1997 Trans Am convertible

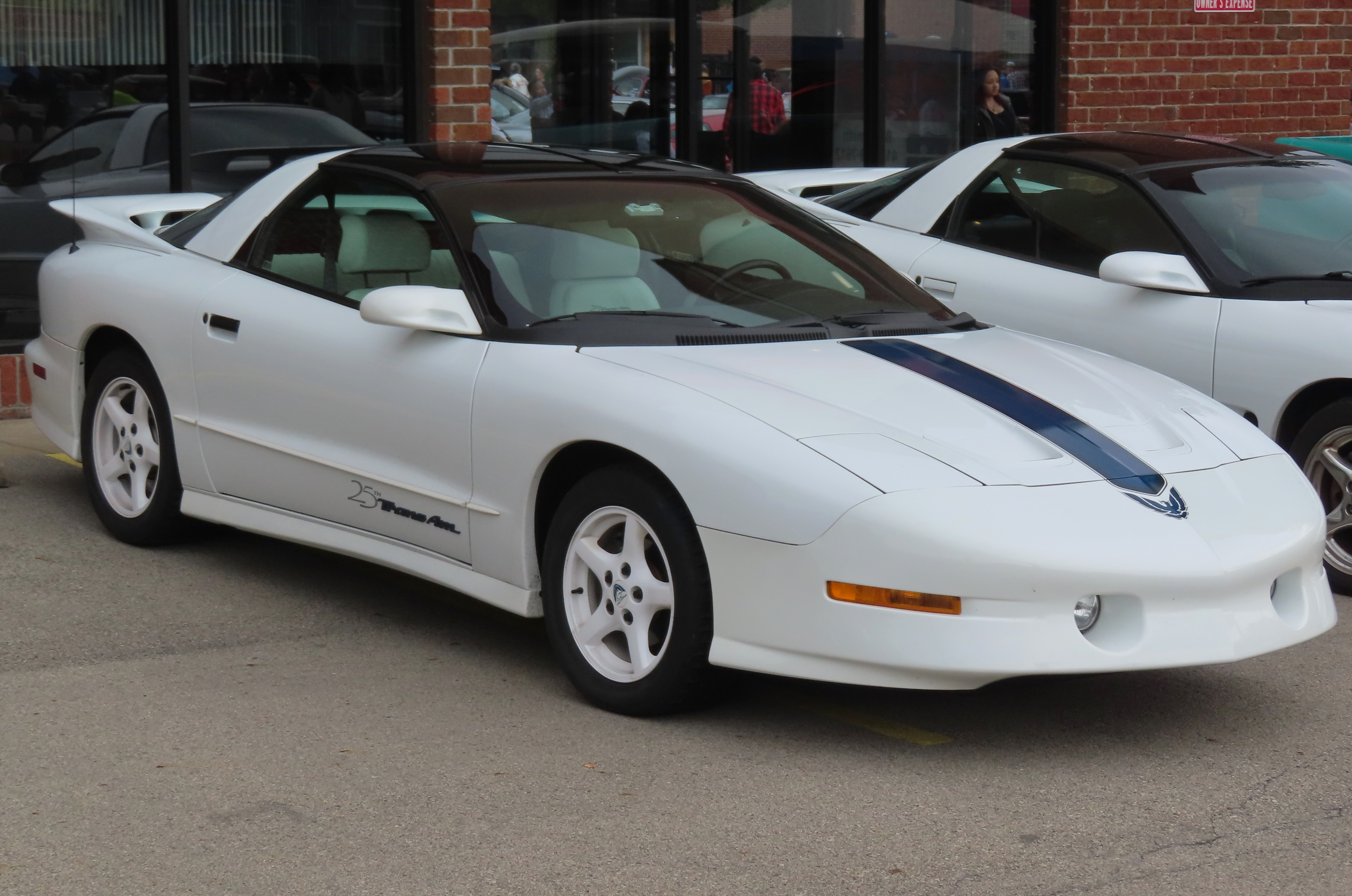
1994 Trans Am GT 25th Anniversary coupe

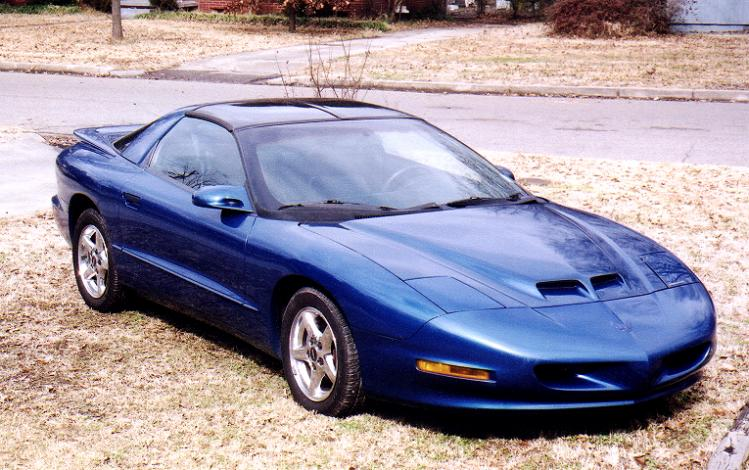
1996 Firebird Formula with functional "Ram Air" hood

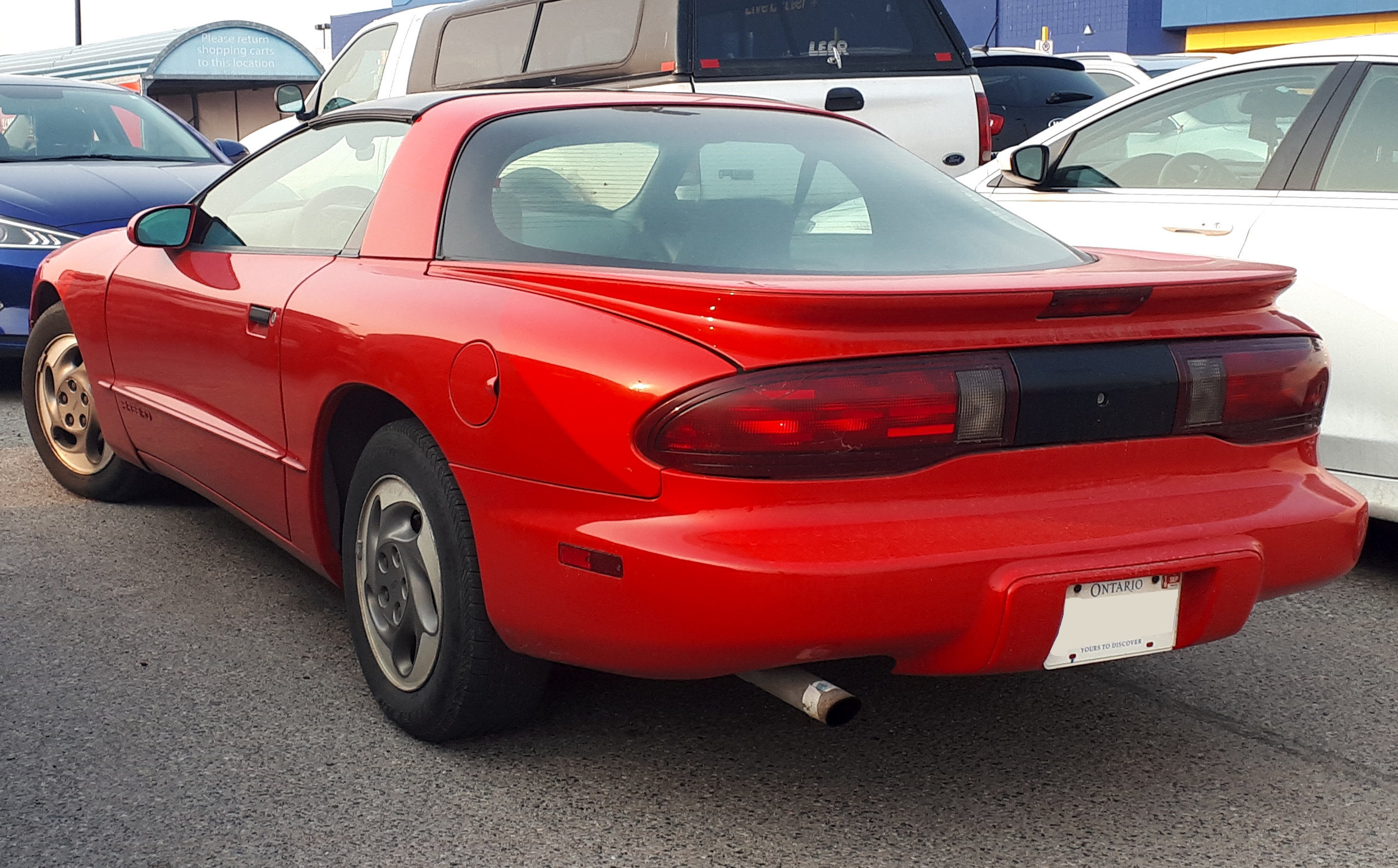
rear view (1993–1997)

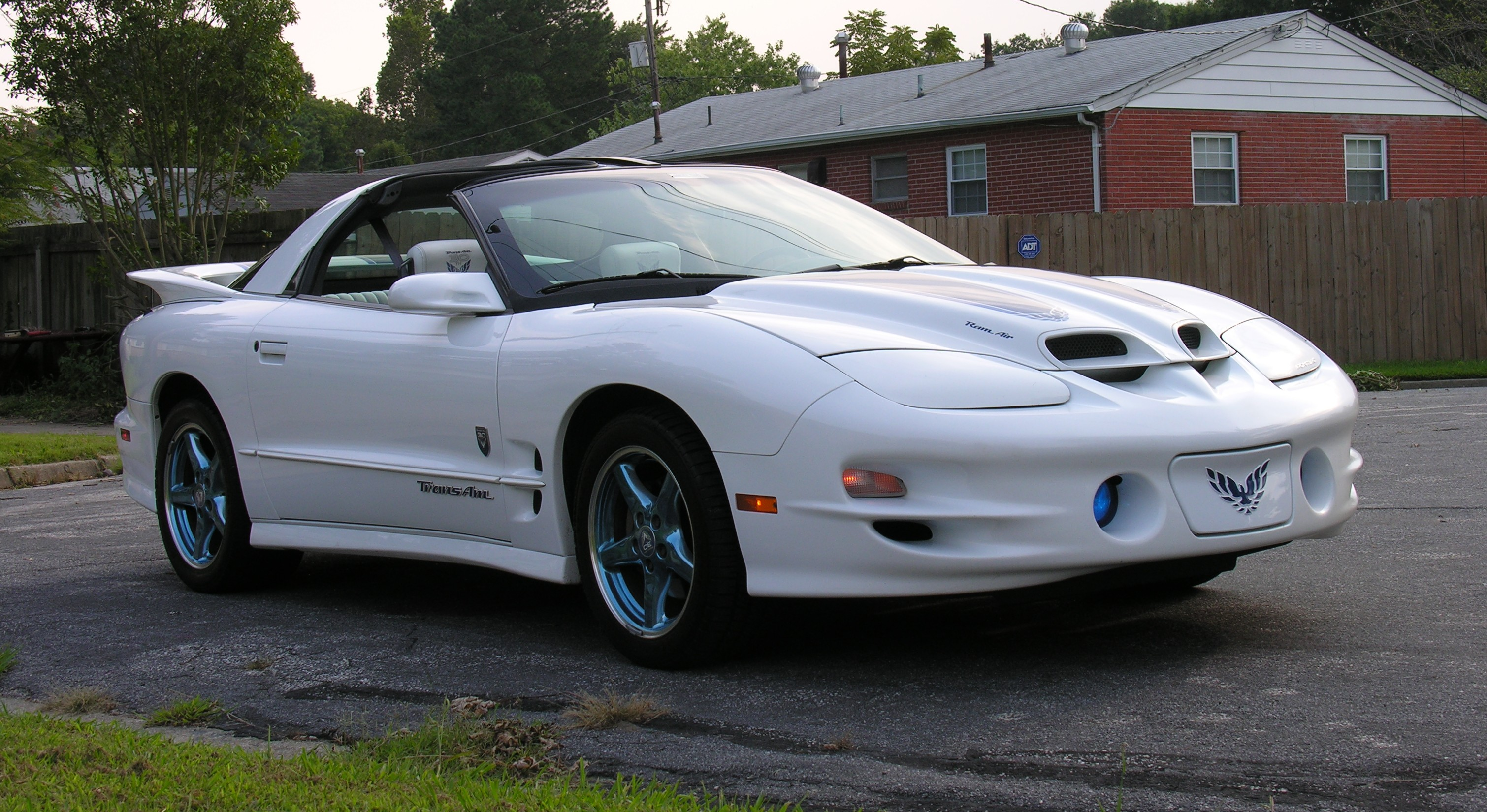
The 1999 30th Anniversary Trans Am

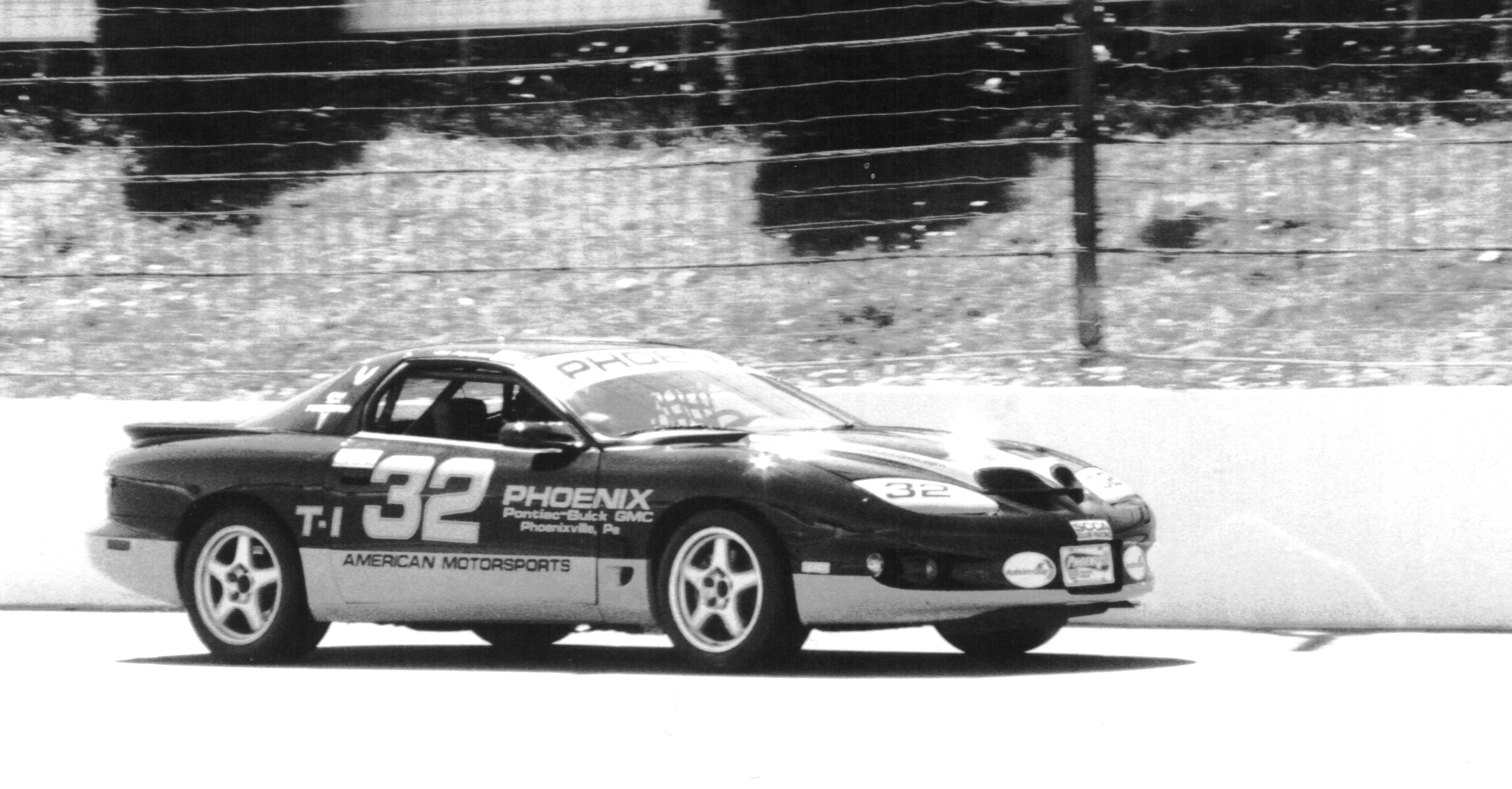
Joe Aquilante on the front stretch of Pocono Raceway 1999, to become SCCA national champ in T-1

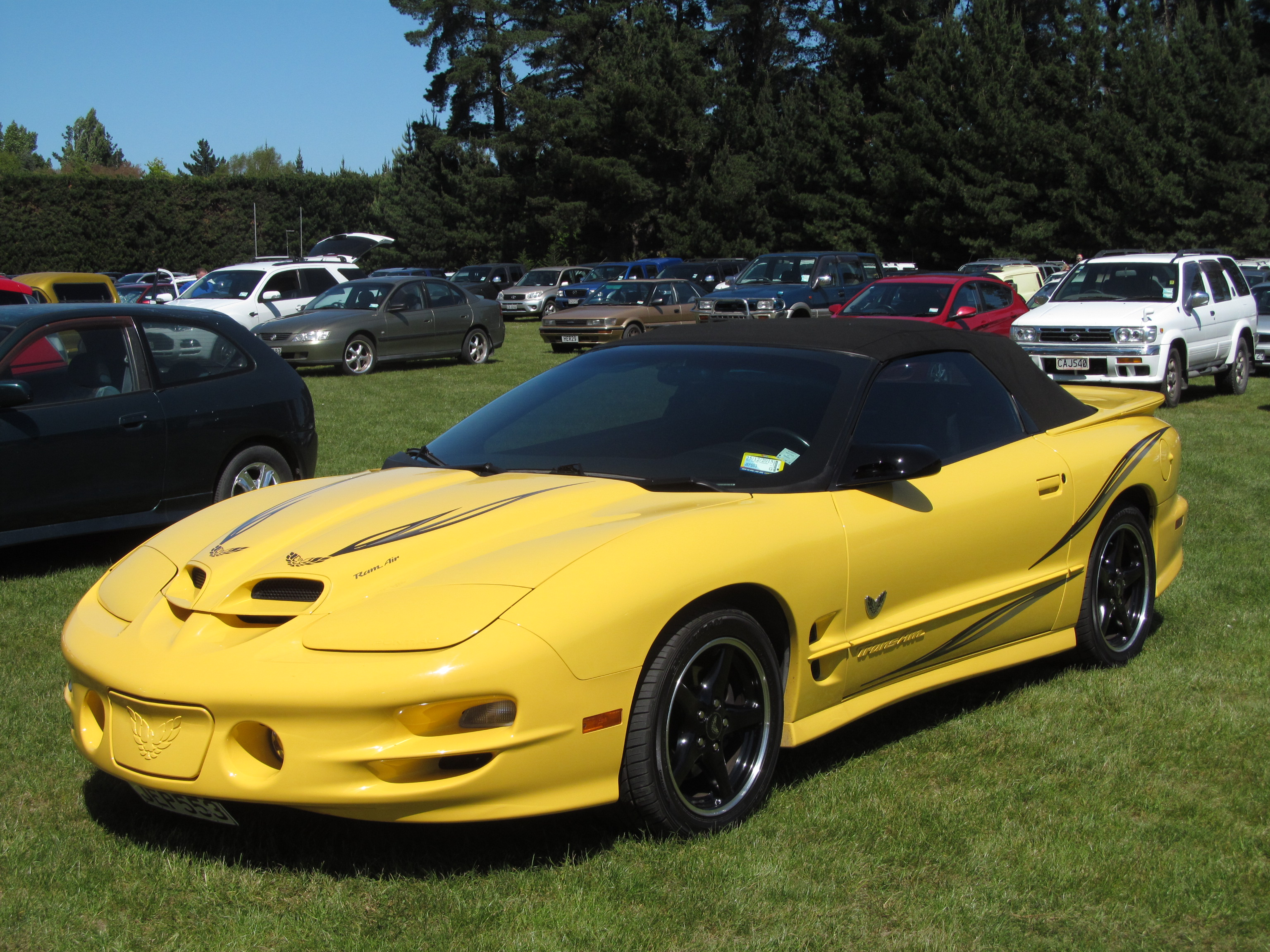
Pontiac Firebird Trans Am Collector's Edition convertible

=== Engines ===
1993	3.4 L (207.5 cu in) L32 V6	5.7 L 350 CID LT1 V8 (iron block, aluminum heads)	
1994	3.4 L (207.5 cu in) L32 V6	5.7 L 350 CID LT1 V8 (iron block, aluminum heads)	
1995	3.4 L (207.5 cu in) L32 V6	3.8 L (231.9 cu in) L36 V6 (California Only)	5.7 L 350 CID LT1 V8 (iron block, aluminum heads)
1996	3.8 L (231.9 cu in) L36 V6	5.7 L 350 CID LT1 V8 (iron block, aluminum heads)	
1997	3.8 L (231.9 cu in) L36 V6	5.7 L 350 CID LT1 V8 (iron block, aluminum heads)	5.7 L 350 CID LT4 V8 (iron block, aluminum heads) in Firehawk by SLP
1998	3.8 L (231.9 cu in) L36 V6	5.7 L 346 CID LS1 V8 (aluminum block and heads)	
1999	3.8 L (231.9 cu in) L36 V6	5.7 L 346 CID LS1 V8 (aluminum block and heads)	
2000	3.8 L (231.9 cu in) L36 V6	5.7 L 346 CID LS1 V8 (aluminum block and heads)	
2001	3.8 L (231.9 cu in) L36 V6	5.7 L 346 CID LS1 V8 (aluminum block and heads)	
2002	3.8 L (231.9 cu in) L36 V6	5.7 L 346 CID LS1 V8 (aluminum block and heads)	

== Firebird Trans Am ==
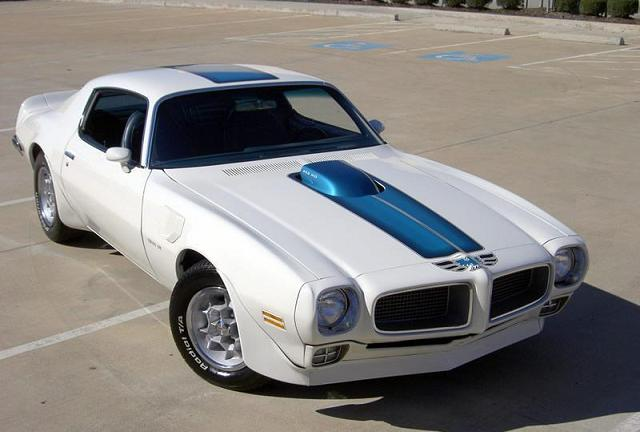
1970 Pontiac Trans Am

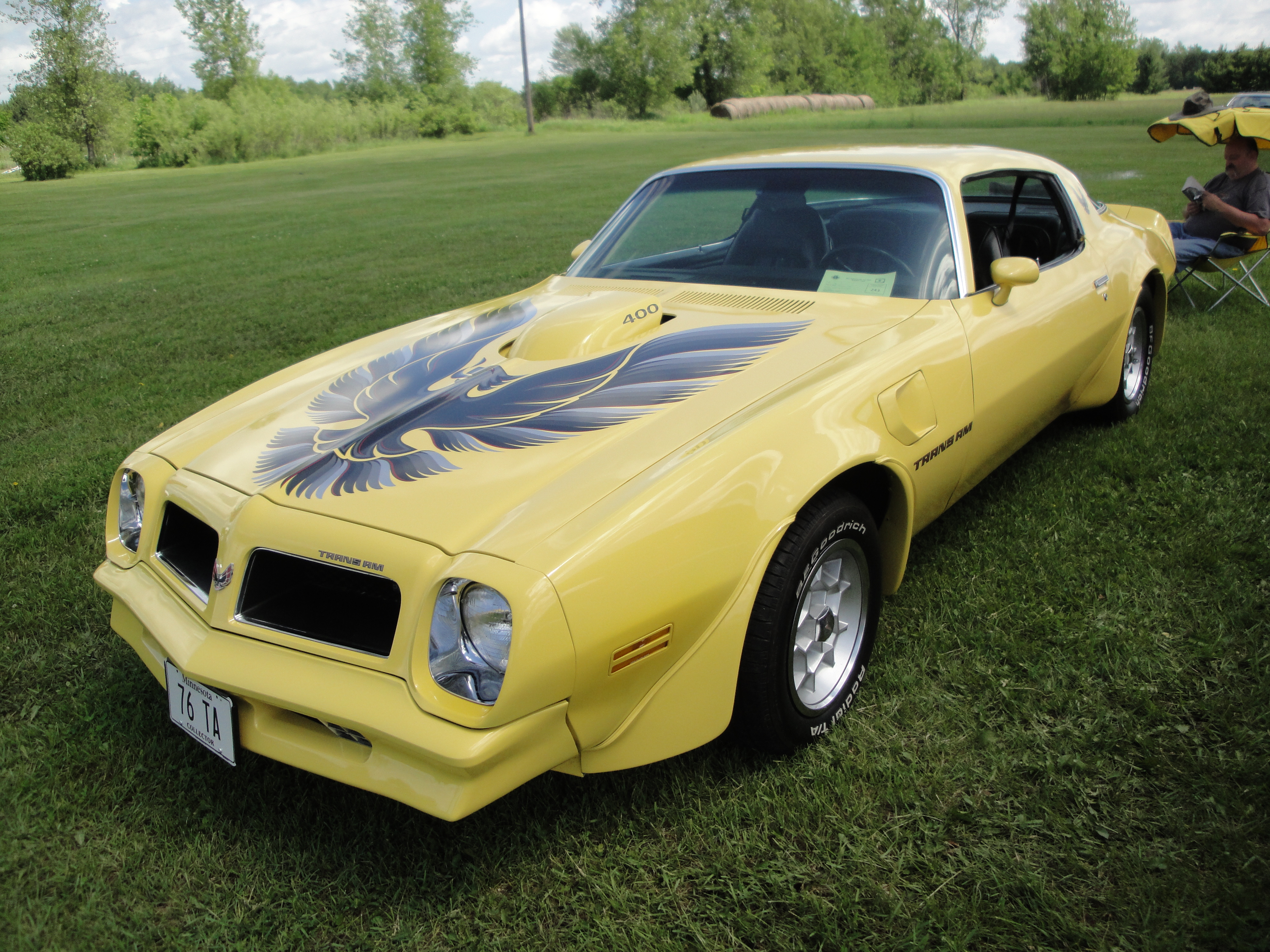
1976 Pontiac Trans Am

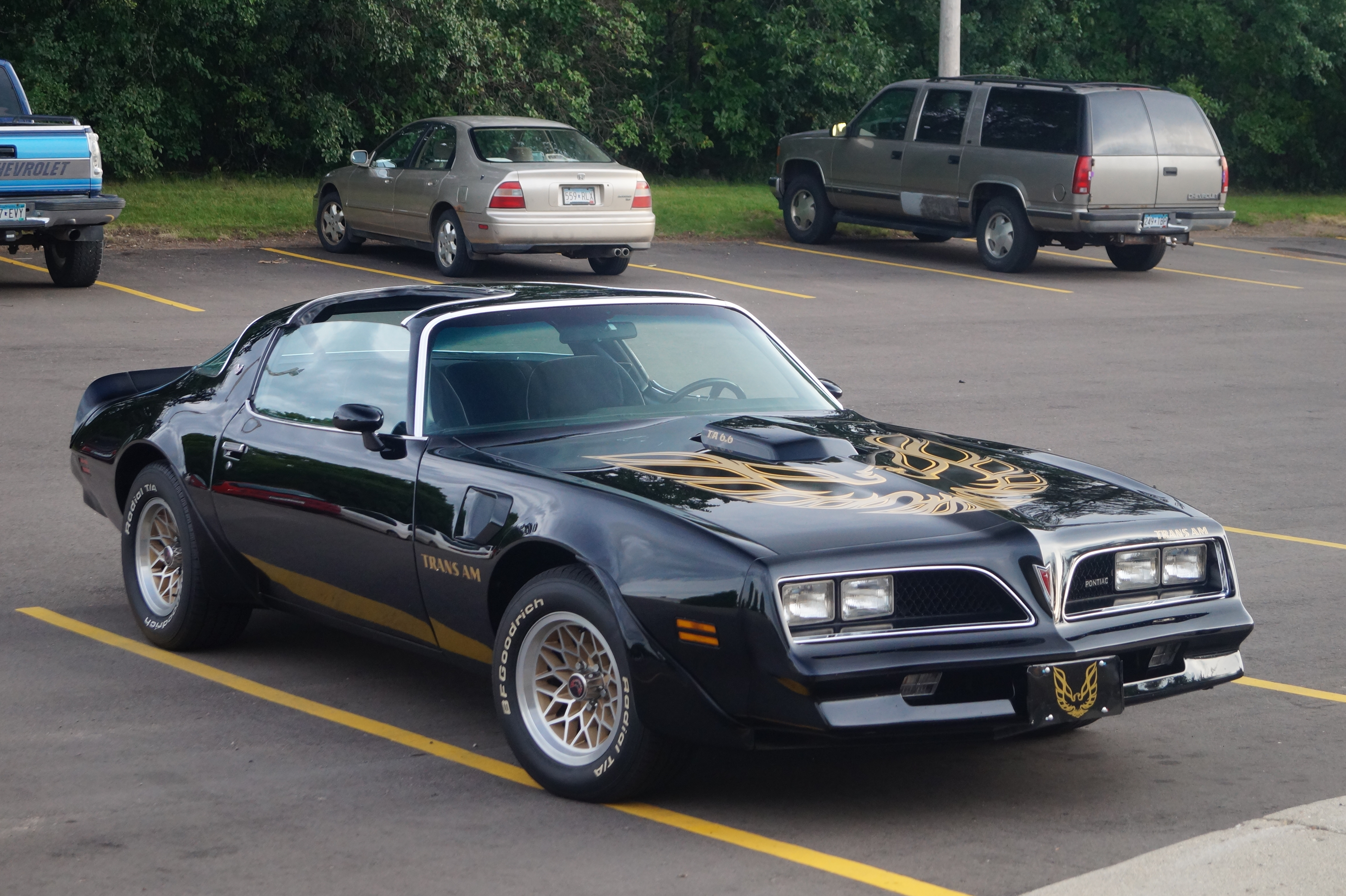
1978 Pontiac Trans Am

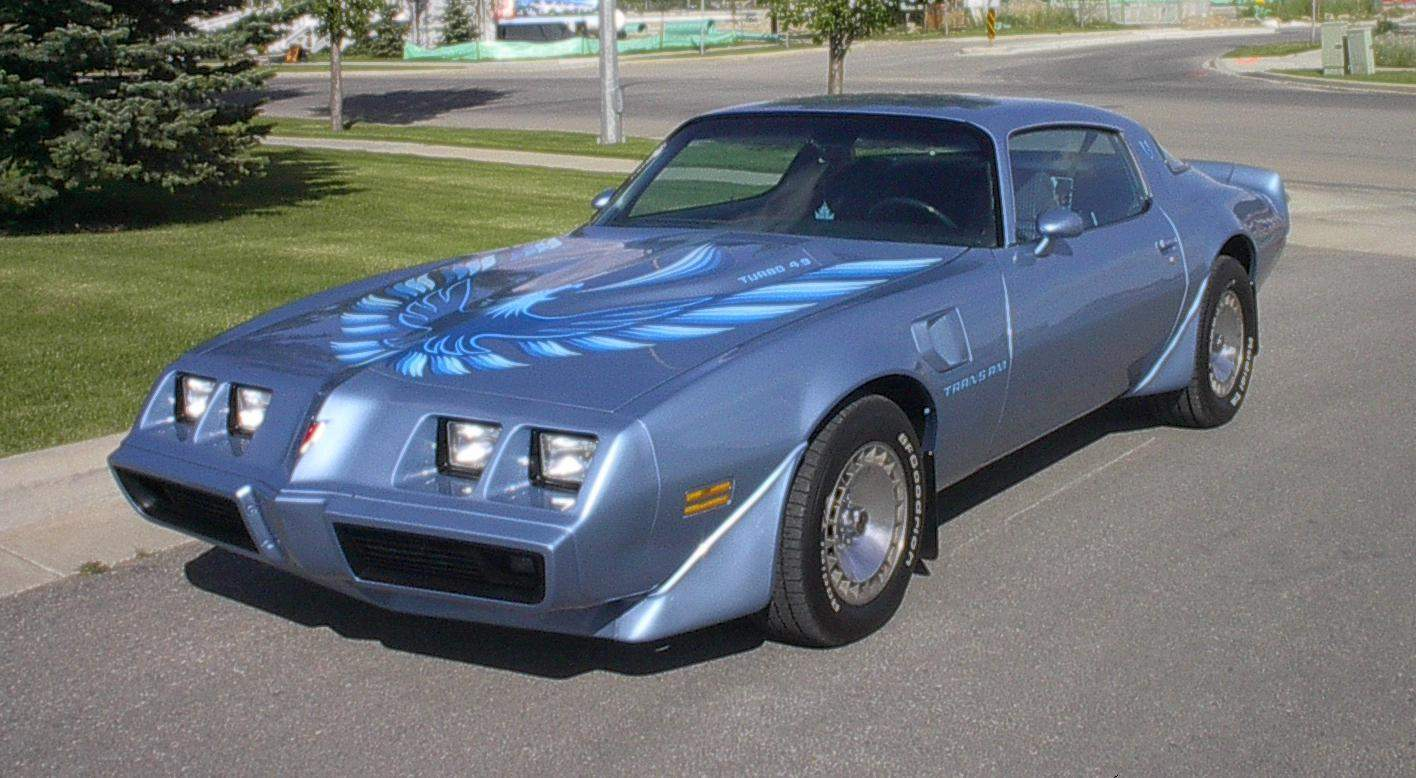
1981 Pontiac Turbo Trans Am

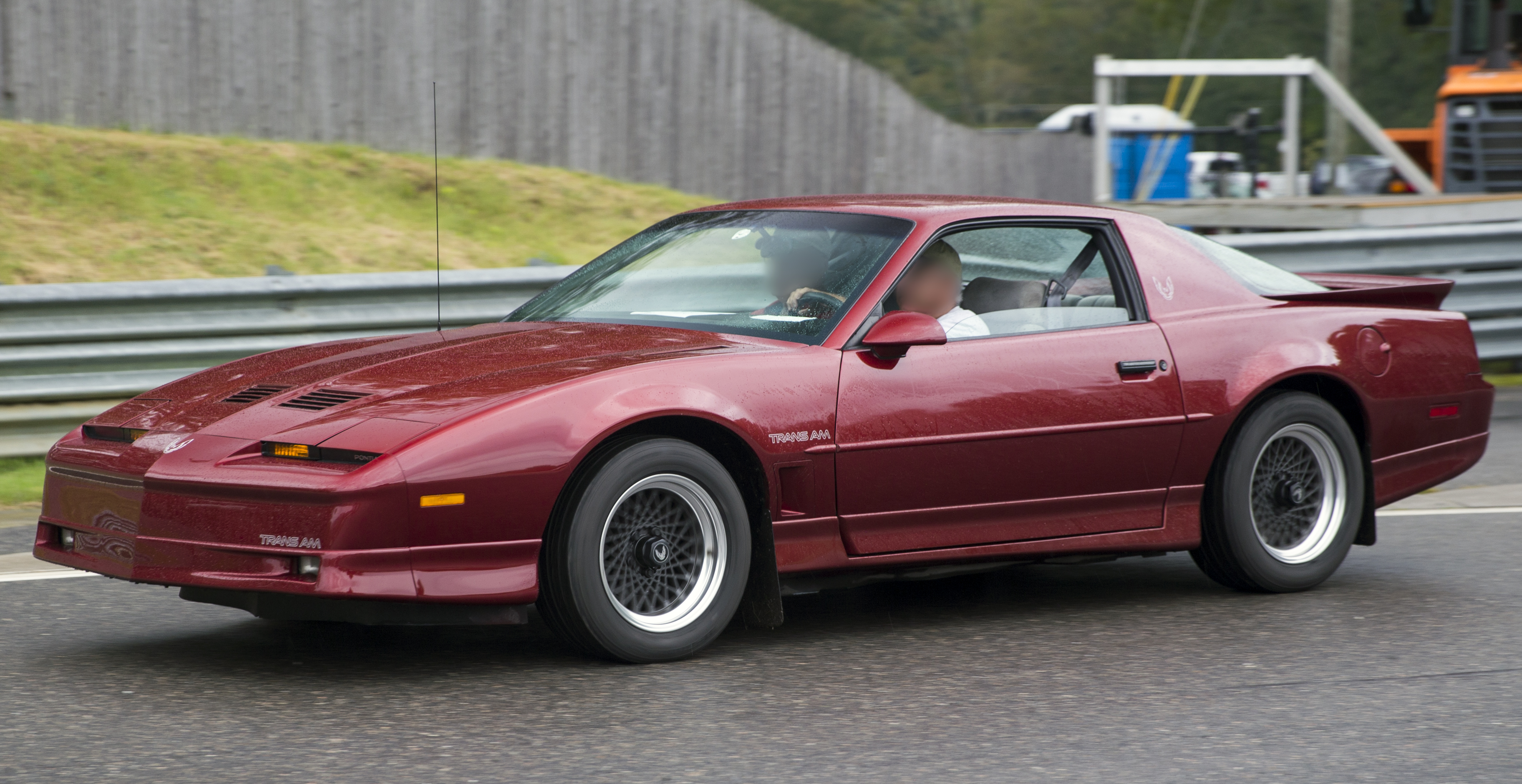
1987 Pontiac Trans Am

The Trans Am was a specialty package for the Firebird, typically upgrading handling, suspension, and horsepower, as well as minor appearance modifications such as exclusive hoods, spoilers, fog lights and wheels. Introduced for 1969, it continued throughout the Firebird's production run.

Despite its name, the Trans Am was not initially used in the Trans Am Series, as its smallest engine exceeded the SCCA's five-liter displacement limit.

The Firebird Trans Am was selected as the Official Pace Car for the 1979 Daytona 500, 1980 Indianapolis 500, and again for the 1981 Daytona 500.

The Trans Am GTA (Gran Turismo Americano) was an options package available on the Firebird Trans Am which added gold 16-inch diamond-spoke alloy wheels, a monochromatic paint scheme, and special cloisonné GTA badges. The GTA (along with the Formula model that was intended to fill the gap between the base model Firebird and mid-level Trans Am) was the brainchild of former Pontiac marketing manager Lou Wassel. It was intended to be the "ultimate" Trans Am and was the most expensive Firebird available. The GTA equipment package officially went on sale in 1987 and avoided a gas-guzzler tax thanks to its lightweight PW 16-inch gold cross-lace wheels. The high-performance WS6 suspension package was also re-tuned to offer a more compliant ride while still maintaining tight handling characteristics. Engine choices consisted of an L98 5.7 litres (350 cu in) TPI V8 mated to GM's corporate 700R4 automatic transmission or the 5.0 litres (310 cu in) TPI V8. A five-speed manual was available but was mated to the 5.0 L only. The GTA trim level was available from 1987 through the 1992 model year.

For 1989, the 20th-anniversary turbo Trans Am project (originally conceived by Bill Owen of Pontiac) was outsourced to PAS, Inc., an engineering firm led by Jeff Beitzel. Beitzel and his team did most of the TTA development work. The 3.8 L turbocharged V6 engines were built by PAS at their 40,000 square foot City of Industry, CA plant. From there, they went to GM's plant in Van Nuys, CA to be installed into GTAs on the F-Body assembly line. The cars were then shipped back to PAS for final assembly, testing, and quality control. Incidentally, the GTA chassis were selected at random, thus there is no correlation between the VIN and production sequence number. The initial number of cars to be produced ranged from 500 to 2,500 until GM finally settled on 1,500. In all, a total of 1,555 Turbo Trans Ams were manufactured. One of these served as the 1989 Indianapolis 500 pace car.

The 2002 model-year WS6 Trans Am produced 310 hp (231 kW) at 5,200 rpm and 340 lb⋅ft (461 N⋅m) of torque at 4,000 rpm out of its 5.7 L LS1 V8 engine.

=== Engines ===
==== First generation ====
1969	400 cu in (6.6 L) Pontiac Ram Air 400 V8 335 bhp (250 kW)	400 cu in (6.6 L) Pontiac Ram Air IV V8 345 bhp (257 kW)

==== Second generation ====
1970	400 cu in (6.6 L) Pontiac Ram Air 400 V8 345 hp	400 cu in (6.6 L) Pontiac Ram Air IV V8 370 hp	400 cu in (6.6 L) Pontiac Ram Air V V8 (Note: There are no known 1970 Trans Ams with the Ram Air V, no complete engines were ever sold or shipped to dealers, but the parts needed to build one could be ordered over-the-counter.)
1971	455 cu in (7.5 L) Pontiac H.O. V8		
1972	455 cu in (7.5 L) Pontiac H.O. V8		
1973	455 cu in (7.5 L) Pontiac V8	455 cu in (7.5 L) Pontiac Super Duty V8	
1974	400 cu in (6.6 L) Pontiac V8 L78	455 cu in (7.5 L) Pontiac V8	455 cu in (7.5 L) Pontiac S.D. V8
1975	400 cu in (6.6 L) Pontiac V8 L78	455 cu in (7.5 L) Pontiac V8 455 H.O. (Note: These cars came with a 455-H.O decal on the Shaker Hood Scoop but were not anywhere near the same engine as the 71–72 H.O.'s. They were standard production engines lifted from Pontiac's station wagon line and transplanted straight into the T/A. Rated at ~ 200 hp. Pontiac did this to try to boost sales, and the engine was only available with the 4-speed manual transmission. A total of 857 were built as it was a mid-year addition.)	
1976	400 cu in (6.6 L) Pontiac V8 L78	455 cu in (7.5 L) Pontiac V8 455 (Note: The only difference between this engine and the previous 1975 engine is the H.O. was removed from the shaker hood scoop and simply said 455. It came with a 4-speed manual transmission. A total of 7,099 were built during this year's full production run.)	
1977	400 cu in (6.6 L) Pontiac V8 L78	403 cu in (6.6 L) Oldsmobile V8	400 cu in (6.6 L) Pontiac W72 V8
1978	400 cu in (6.6 L) Pontiac V8 L78	403 cu in (6.6 L) Oldsmobile V8	400 cu in (6.6 L) Pontiac W72 V8
1979	301 cu in (4.9 L) Pontiac V8	403 cu in (6.6 L) Oldsmobile V8	400 cu in (6.6 L) Pontiac W72 V8 (4-speed only) (Note: These engines were actually 1978s that were stockpiled for 1979. Pontiac ceased production of the 400 in 1978.)
1980	301 cu in (4.9 L) Pontiac V8	305 cu in (5.0 L) Chevrolet V8	301 cu in (4.9 L) Pontiac turbo V8
1981	301 cu in (4.9 L) Pontiac V8	305 cu in (5.0 L) Chevrolet V8 (4-speed only)	301 cu in (4.9 L) Pontiac turbo V8

Notes A:

==== Third generation ====
From 1982 onward, all engines were Chevrolet sourced, unless stated otherwise.

1982	305 cu in (5.0 L) 4 barrel V8	305 cu in (5.0 L) cross-fire injection V8 (First year for fuel injection in Trans Am)		
1983	305 cu in (5.0 L) 4 barrel V8	305 cu in (5.0 L) cross-fire injection V8	305 cu in (5.0 L) 4 barrel V8 H.O. (662 were made, all 5-speeds)	
1984	305 cu in (5.0 L) 4 barrel V8	305 cu in (5.0 L) 4 barrel H.O. V8 (1500 anniversary edition models were made, 500 of them 5-speed)		
1985	305 cu in (5.0 L) 4 barrel V8	305 cu in (5.0 L) tuned port injection V8	305 cu in (5.0 L) 4 barrel H.O. V8 H.O. (5-speed only)	
1986	305 cu in (5.0 L) 4 barrel V8	305 cu in (5.0 L) tuned port injection V8	305 cu in (5.0 L) 4 barrel V8 H.O. (5-speed only) A total of 69 were built.	
1987	305 cu in (5.0 L) 4 barrel V8	305 cu in (5.0 L) tuned port injection V8	350 cu in (5.7 L) tuned port injection V8	
1988	305 cu in (5.0 L) throttle body injection V8	305 cu in (5.0 L) tuned port injection V8	350 cu in (5.7 L) tuned port injection V8	
1989	305 cu in (5.0 L) throttle body injection V8	305 cu in (5.0 L) tuned port injection V8	350 cu in (5.7 L) tuned port injection V8	231 cu in (3.8 L) Buick Turbo V6
1990	305 cu in (5.0 L) throttle body injection V8	305 cu in (5.0 L) tuned port injection V8	350 cu in (5.7 L) tuned port injection V8	
1991	305 cu in (5.0 L) throttle body injection V8	305 cu in (5.0 L) tuned port injection V8	350 cu in (5.7 L) tuned port injection V8	
1992	305 cu in (5.0 L) throttle body injection V8	305 cu in (5.0 L) tuned port injection V8	350 cu in (5.7 L) tuned port injection V8	

== Post–Pontiac Trans Am ==
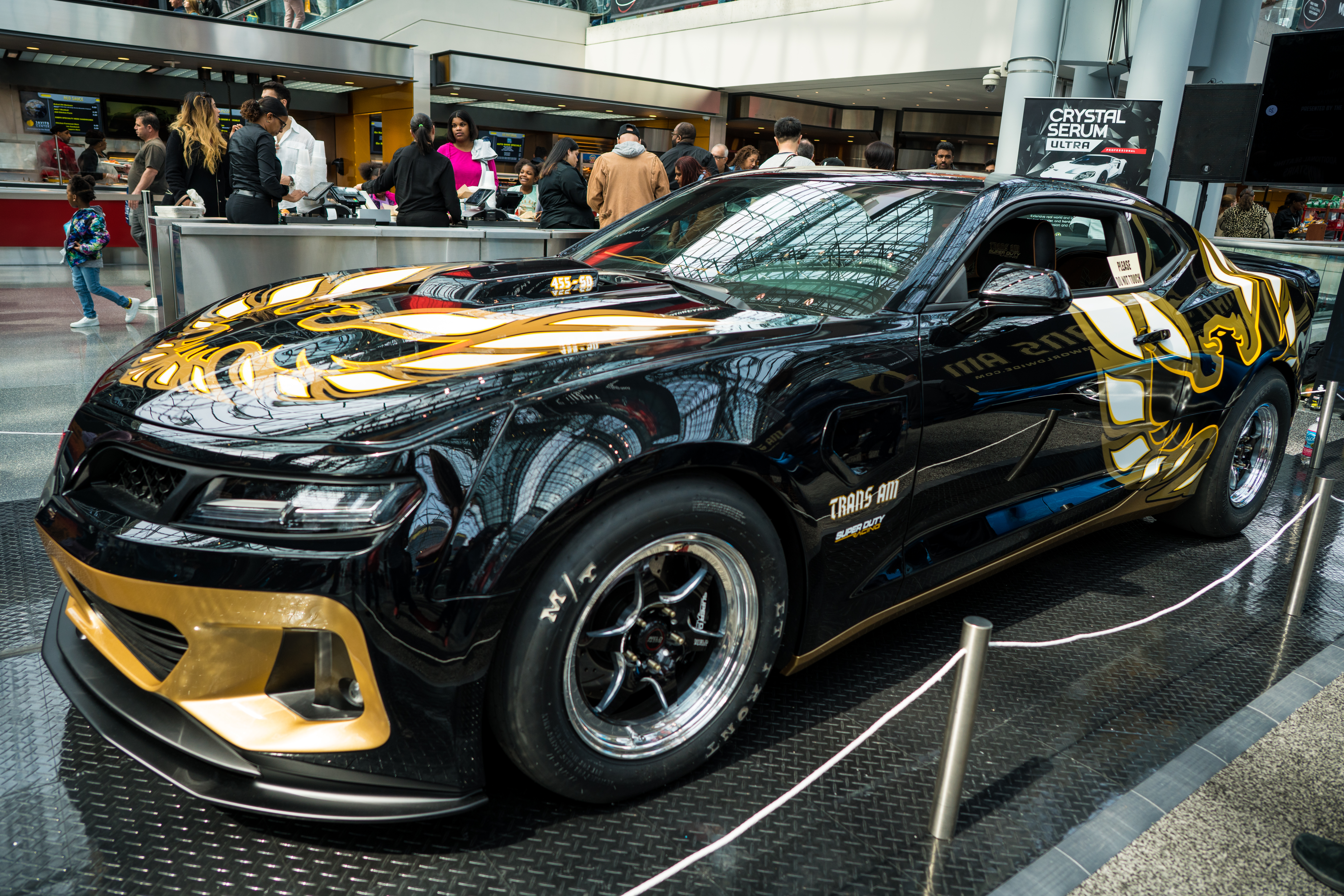
Trans Am Super Duty at the NYIAS

In 2012, General Motors signed a licensing deal with Trans Am Depot to use the Trans Am name and Pontiac logos in custom coach built versions of new Trans Am. Under this agreement, Trans Am Depot takes brand-new model Chevrolet Camaros, strips them down to their basic components and rebuilds what looks like a new Trans Am. They make these in the designs of the 6T9 version Trans Am, 6T9 Goat ("GTO"), 7T7 Trans Am and the limited-edition Hurst Trans Am.

On March 26, 2017, at the New York International Auto Show, the Bandit Edition Trans Am was introduced. Built by Trans Am Depot, only 77 will be produced, each signed by Burt Reynolds. Powertrain is a 455 cu in (7.5 L) direct injection version of the current Generation V LT1 V8 engine equipped with a 2.3 litres (140.4 cu in) Magnuson supercharger with a boost of 14 psi (0.97 bar), developing 1,000 hp (746 kW) and 1,046 lb⋅ft (1,418 N⋅m) of torque.

=== Burt Reynolds' collection of Firebirds ===
On April 14, 2018, at the Barrett-Jackson collector car auction in Palm Beach, FL, just five months before his death, actor Burt Reynolds presided over the sale of three Pontiac Firebird Trans Ams from his personal collection, sold via Bandit Movie Cars of Florida, the custodian of the Burt Reynolds collection. He was also an avid Firebird collector after filming the Smokey and the Bandit movie series and Hooper. The first car was a red 1977 Firebird Trans Am survivor car from the Restore a Muscle Car Collection with a price of $57,200 (~$72,125 in 2025). The second vehicle was a rare 1974 Pontiac Trans AM 455 Super Duty, which was another survivor that reached $100,000 (~$126,092 in 2025) plus 10% buyer commission. The third car Reynolds sold was a 1980 Indianapolis Pace car turbo Trans Am, which was also $100,000, (~$126,092 in 2025) plus 10% buyer commission.

== Performance (Firebird / Firebird Trans Am) ==
Engine	Year(s)	Power	0–60 mph (0–97 km/h)	Top speed	Comments
400 cu in (6.6 L) Pontiac W72 V8	1979	220 bhp (164 kW)	6.6 s.	> 132 mph (212 km/h)	Trans Am model equipped with 400 4-speed manual
305 cu in (5.0 L) LB9 V8	1989–1992	225 bhp (168 kW)	6.8 s.	> 140 mph (225 km/h)	Formula model equipped with N10/MM5/GM3 option codes
350 cu in (5.7 L) L98 V8	1987–1992	235 bhp (175 kW)	6.2 s.	> 145 mph (233 km/h)	GTA model
231 cu in (3.8 L) Buick Turbo V6	1989	250 bhp (186 kW)	4.6 s.	162 mph (261 km/h)	20th anniversary Trans Am pace car
5.7 L (347.8 cu in) LT1 V8	1993–1997	275–285 bhp (205–213 kW)	6.0 s.	155 mph (249 km/h) (electronically limited)	
5.7 L (347.8 cu in) LT1 V8	1996–1997	305 bhp (227 kW)	5.6 s.	155 mph (249 km/h) (electronically limited)	Ram Air
5.7 L (345.7 cu in) LS1 V8	1998–2000	320 bhp (239 kW)	5.2 s.	160 mph (257 km/h) (electronically limited)	
5.7 L (345.7 cu in) LS1 V8	2001–2002	325 bhp (242 kW)	5.0s.	160 mph (257 km/h) (electronically limited)	

== Racing ==
Firebirds were used in the Trans-Am series in the 1960s and 1970s. When the Firebird Trans-Am was released, there was controversy over the model's inability to compete in the Trans-Am because the smallest available engine was too large for use in the series at 400 cubic inches (6.6 L). The name also caused controversy because it was used without permission from the SCCA, who threatened the suit. GM settled the dispute by paying $5 to the SCCA for each car they sold. When the Trans-Am was last seen, the model year 2002 Firebirds were in use. From 1996 to 2006, a WS6 Trans Am coupe provided the body style for the mechanically identical racing cars used in the International Race of Champions (IROC).

During the 1995, 1996, and 1997 NHRA seasons, 14-time funny car champion John Force used a Firebird body to replace the obsolete Oldsmobile Cutlass and Chevrolet Lumina bodies he had used since 1988. He used it for three seasons, winning the championship in all three years. The Firebird was also used by drivers such as Del Worsham, Tim Wilkerson, Frank Pedregon, and Jerry Toliver. The Firebird body also replaced the Oldsmobile Cutlass in the pro stock class in 1995, forcing drivers Warren Johnson, Jerry Eckman, and Mark Pawuk to replace their body styles for the 1996 year. None of them would win with the first year of the Firebird body, but pro stock driver Jim Yates, a second-year driver, using the Firebird body, did.
