= Pontiac LeMans =

Car models marketed by Pontiac division of General Motors

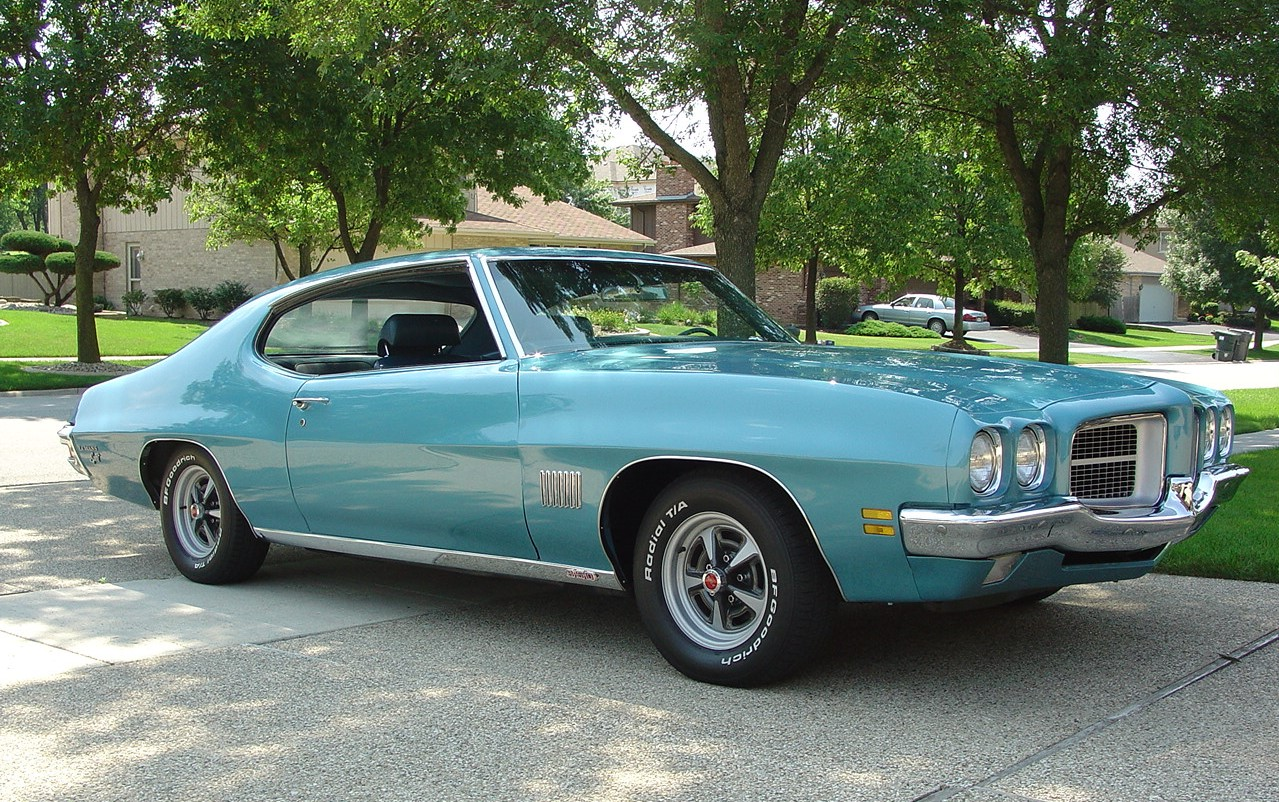
- 1971 Pontiac LeMans Sport hardtop

Overview
- Manufacturer: Pontiac (General Motors) (1961–1981, U.S.) (1971–1983, Canada); Daewoo (General Motors) (1988–1993)
- Production: 1961–1981 (U.S.); 1971–1983 (Canada); 1988–1993 (South Korea)

Body and chassis
- Class: Compact (1961–1963); Mid-size (1964–1981, US) (1964–1983, Canada); Subcompact (1988–1994)

Chronology
- Successor: Pontiac 6000

The Pontiac LeMans /ləˈmɑːnz/ is a model name applied to automobiles marketed by Pontiac. The name came from the French city of Le Mans, the site of the 24 Hours of Le Mans, the world's oldest active sports car endurance race that was first held in 1923. Originally a trim upgrade package based on the Tempest, the LeMans became a separate model in 1963.

In its first five generations spanning from 1961 until 1981 (1983 in Canada), the LeMans was a domestic RWD car; the first generation was a compact, with Gens 2-5 intermediates. From 1988 through 1993 the LeMans name was resurrected for a sixth generation, a FWD subcompact badge-engineered version of the Daewoo LeMans manufactured by Daewoo in South Korea.

Pontiac produced some notable GT/performance versions in the RWD models. The 1st generation not only featured a front-engine/rear-transaxle that very nearly resulted in an ideal 50/50 weight distribution, but also included four-wheel independent suspension for nimble handling, and could be ordered with an optional Buick 215 aluminum V8 engine. The Pontiac GTO is credited with popularizing the muscle car market segment of the 1960s, and by many as the first muscle car. The 1970 model year introduced the LeMans GT-37 package. The 1973-75 Grand Am and 1977 Can Am combined luxury with performance features to emulate European coupes, focusing on balancing handling with power.

== First generation (1961–1963) ==
First generation
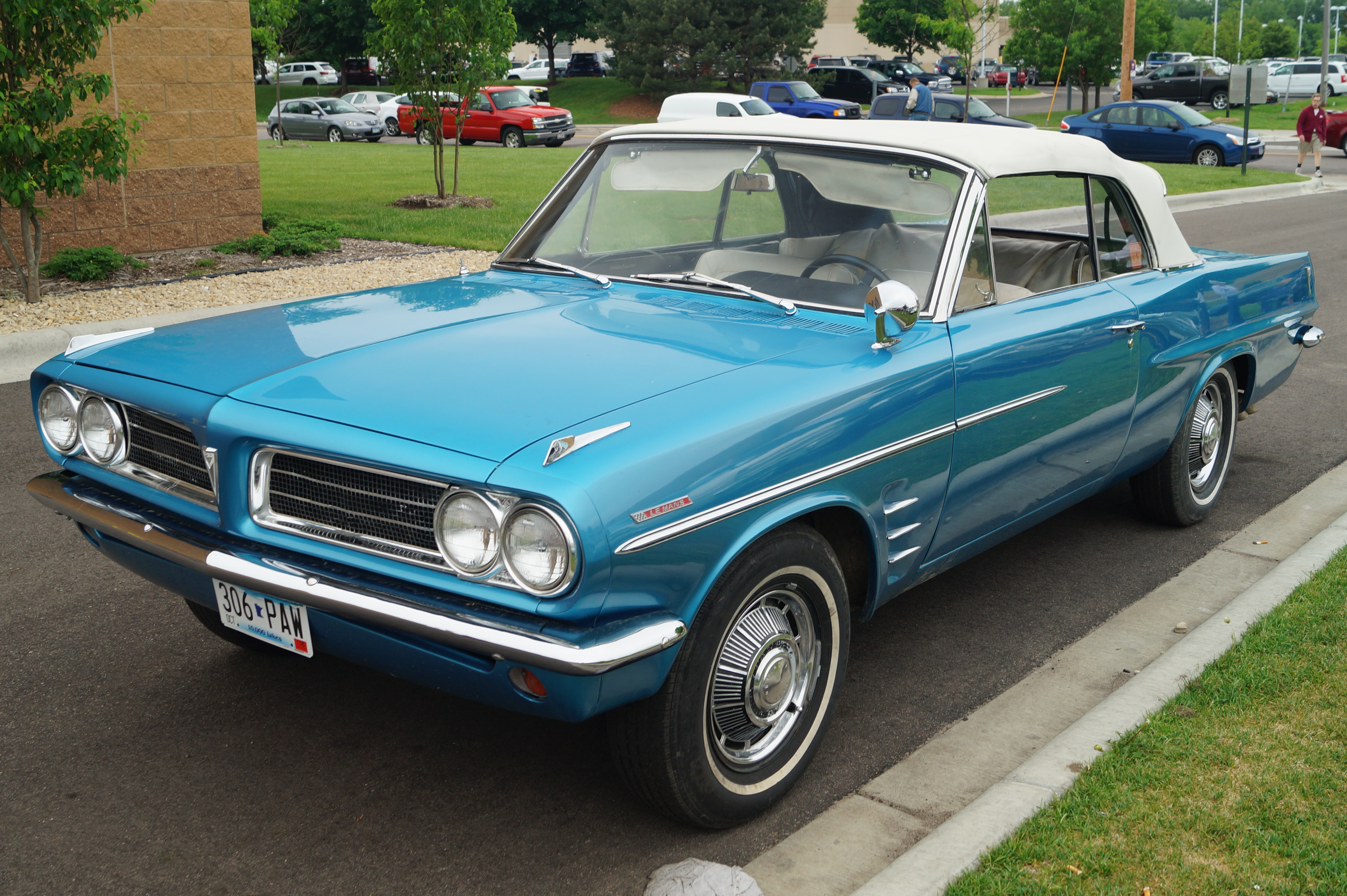
- 1963 Pontiac LeMans convertible

Overview
- Production: 1961–1963
- Assembly: (main plant); Pontiac, Michigan, (Pontiac Assembly) (branch assembly); Kansas City, Kansas, United States, (Fairfax Assembly); South Gate, California, United States, (South Gate Assembly)

Body and chassis
- Body style: 2-door coupe 2-door convertible
- Layout: FR layout
- Platform: Y-body
- Related: Buick Skylark; Oldsmobile Cutlass

Powertrain
- Engine: 194.5 cu in (3.2 L) Trophy 4 I4; 215 cu in (3.5 L) Buick V8; 336 cu in (5.5 L) Pontiac V8

=== 1961 ===
Toward the end of the 1961 model year, the LeMans was introduced as the top trim package of the compact-sized Pontiac Tempest on GM's new Y body platform. The Tempest LeMans featured sportier and more luxurious features and standard equipment than the Tempest, including different badging and bucket seats. The trim option was available only on the two-door sedan (pillared coupe) body style.

=== 1962 ===
For the 1962 model year, the LeMans remained a trim package that was now also available in the convertible body style, as well as with the 194.5 cu in (3.2 L) inline-four cylinder, 4-barrel carbureted engine. There was no pillarless hardtop body style available in either the Tempest or LeMans.

=== 1963 ===
For 1963, the LeMans name was still used only on two-door coupes and convertibles but now was designated as a separate model in the Pontiac compact car lineup. This was available for one year. The 194.5 cu in (3.2 L) four-cylinder was standard and the 336 cu in (5.5 L) V8 engine was optional.

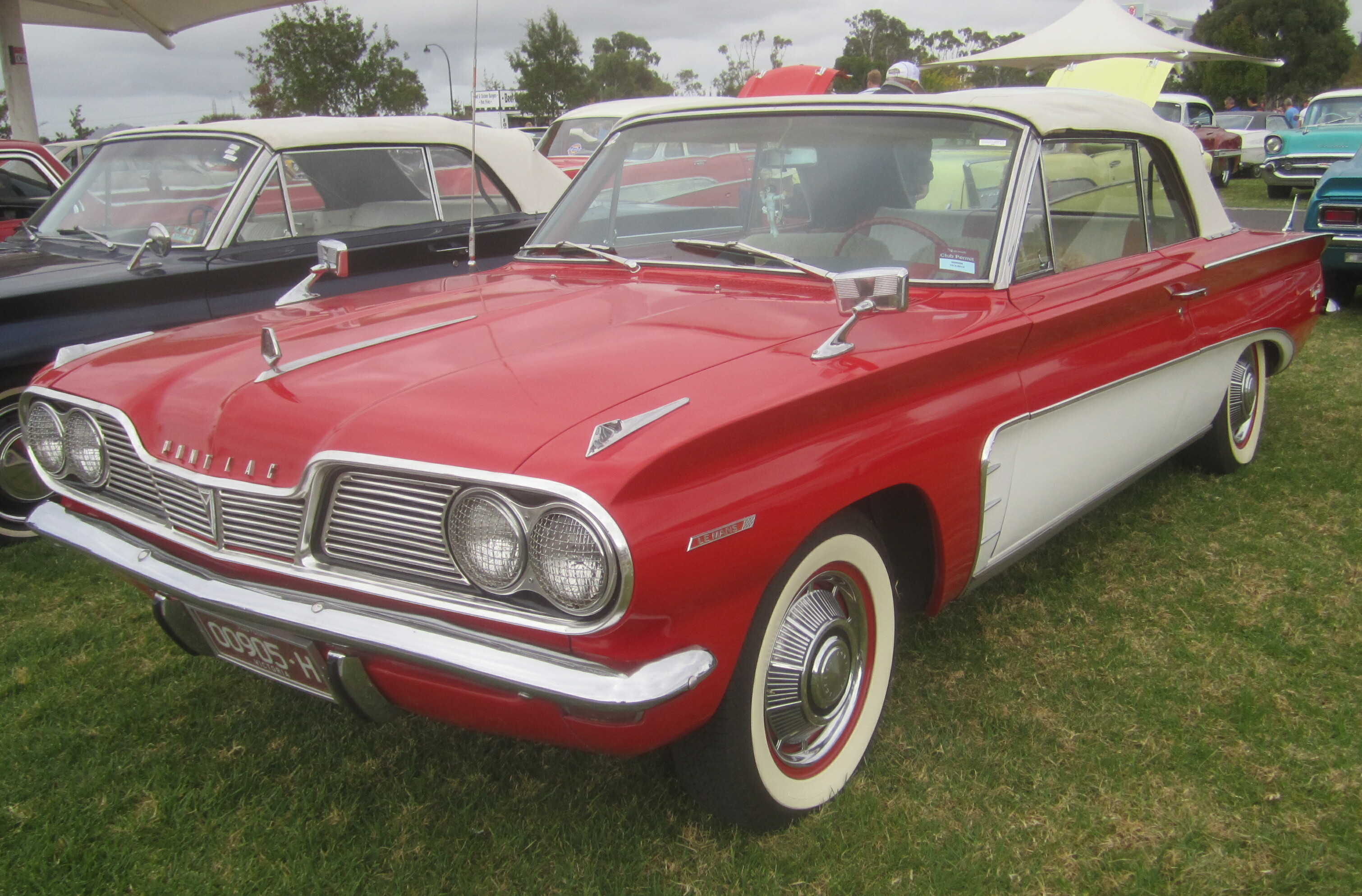
1962 Pontiac Tempest LeMans convertible

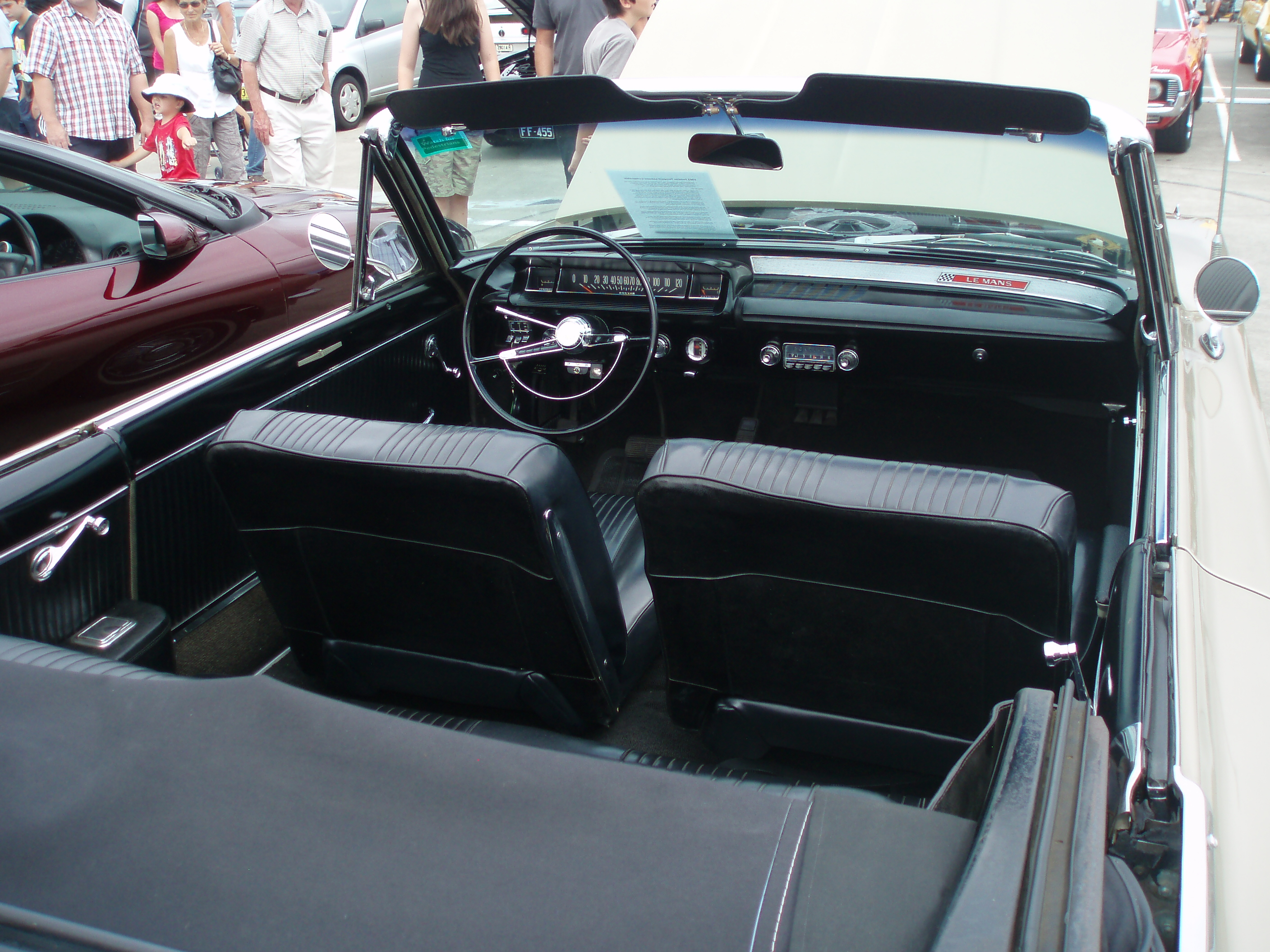
1962 Pontiac LeMans convertible interior

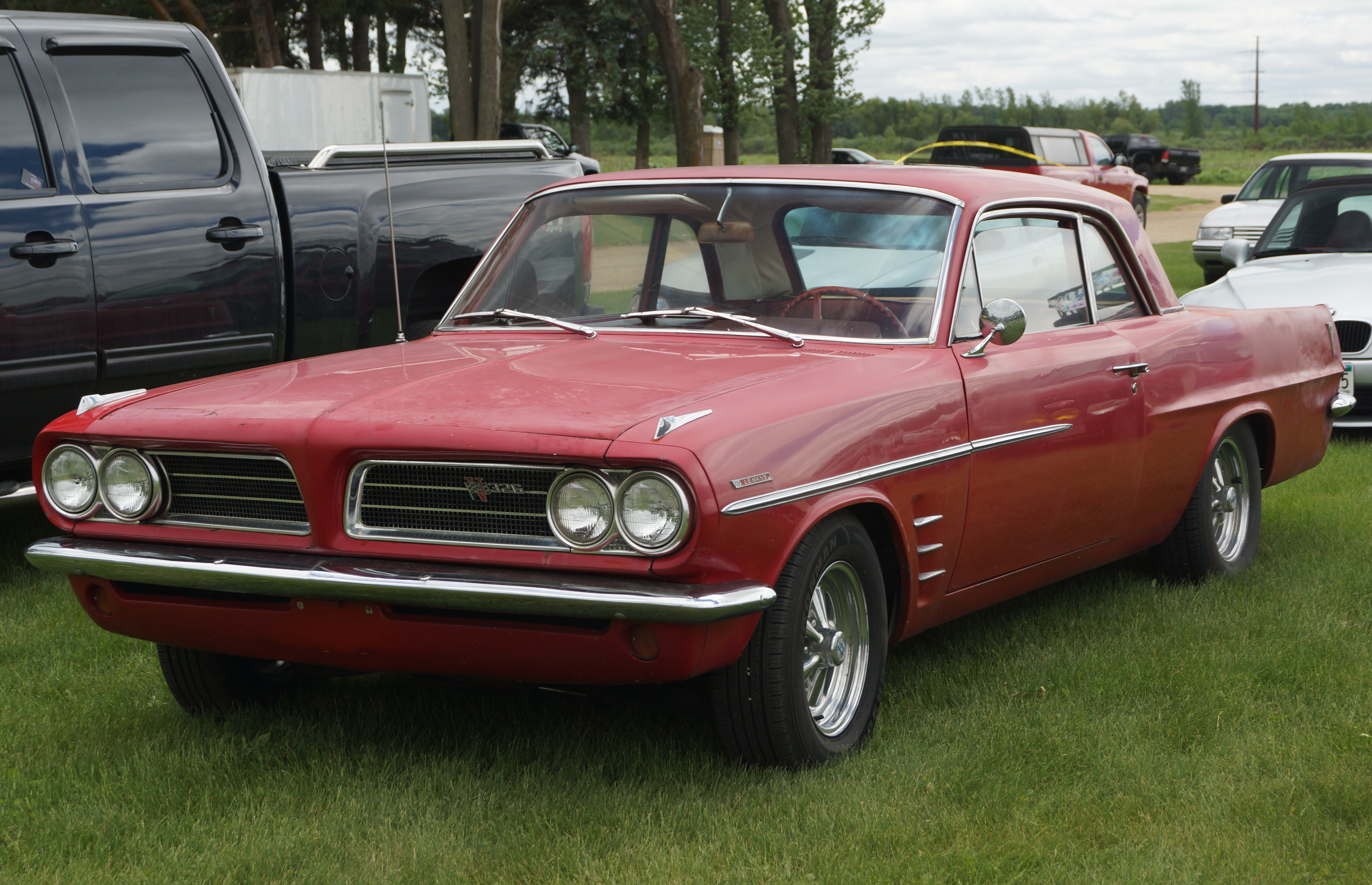
1963 Pontiac LeMans coupe

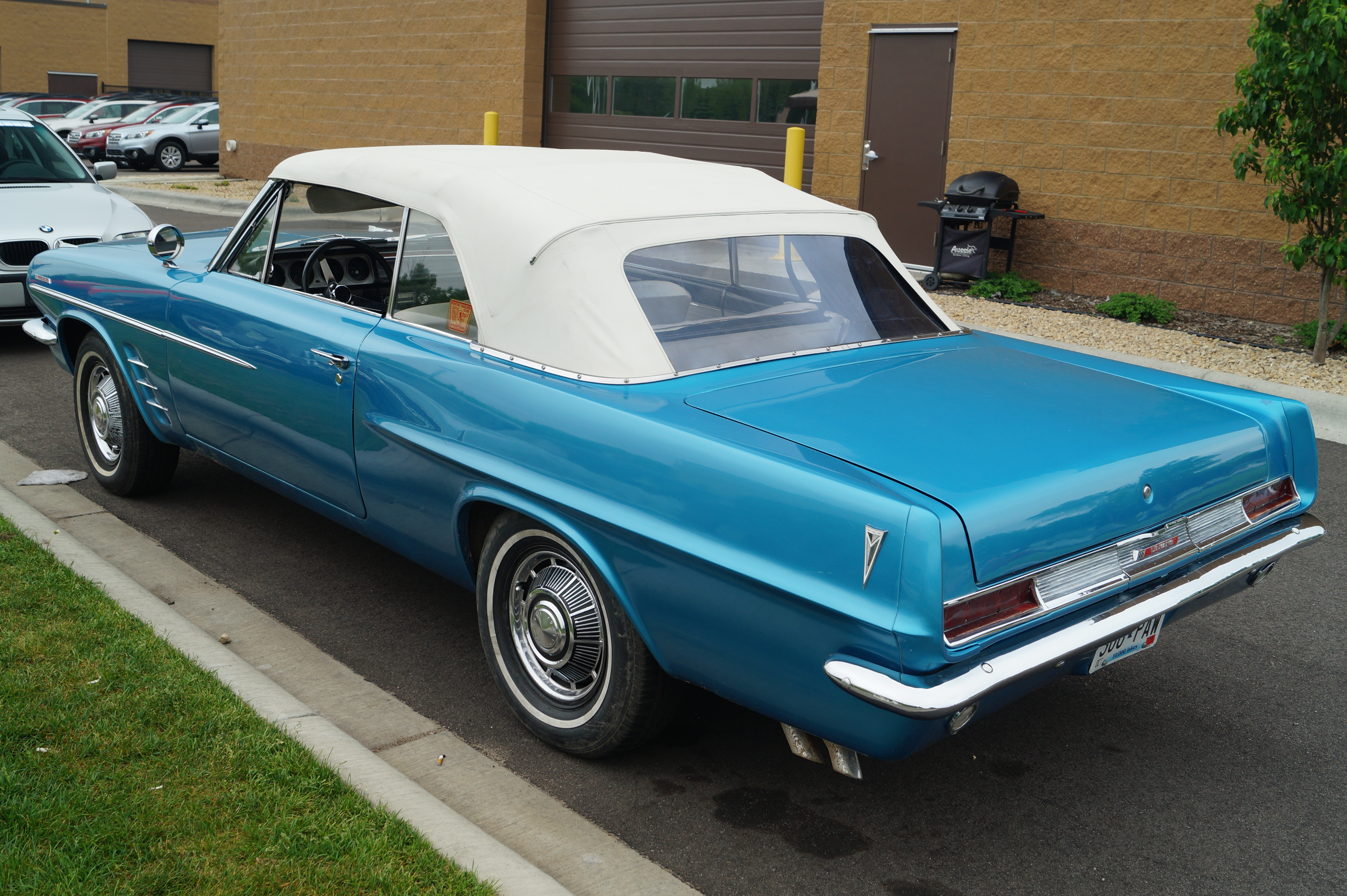
1963 Pontiac LeMans convertible (rear)

== Second generation (1964–1967) ==
Second generation
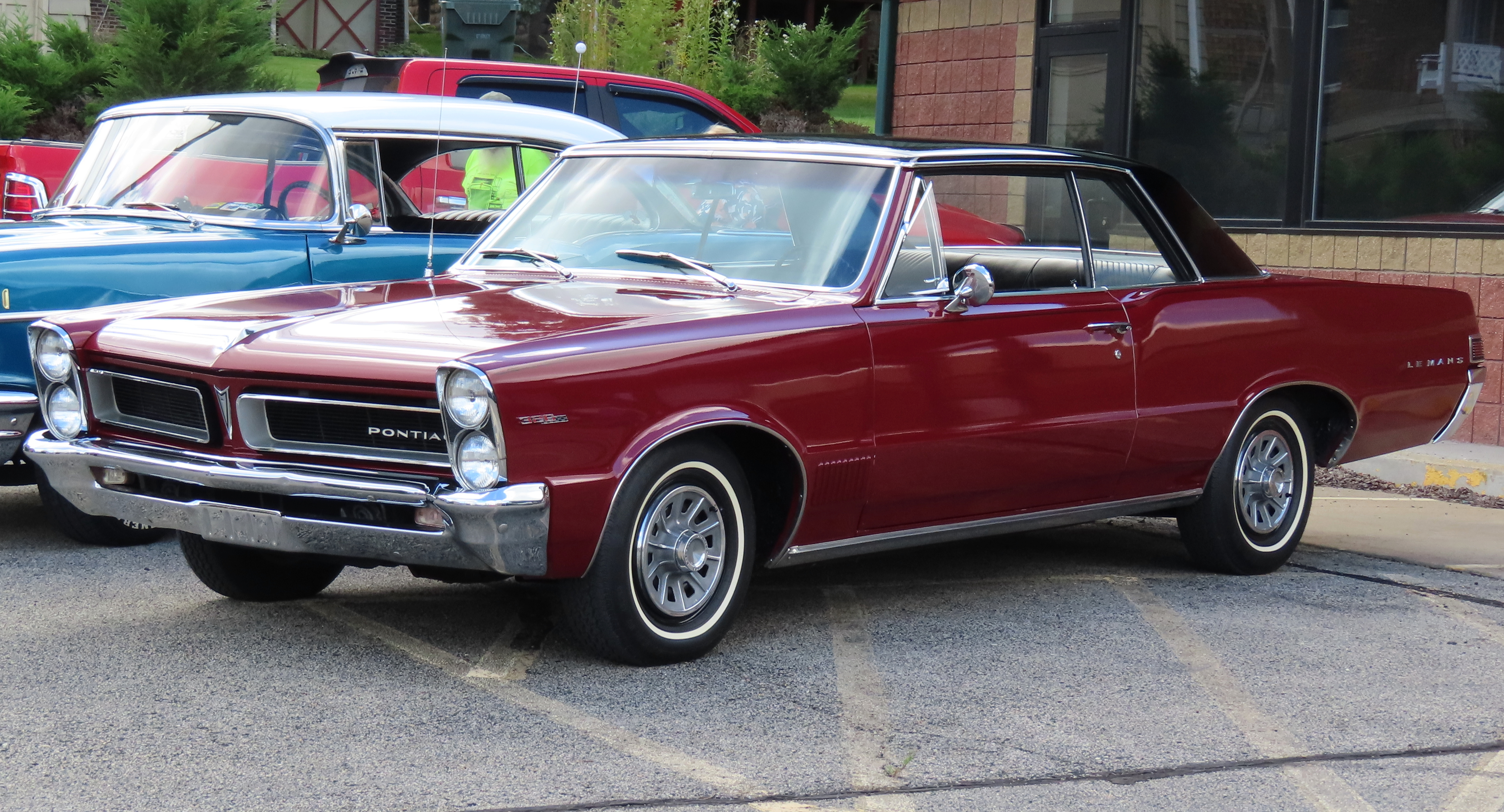
- 1965 Pontiac Le Mans hardtop coupe

Overview
- Production: 1964–1967
- Assembly: (Main Plant): Pontiac Assembly, Pontiac MI, US (Branch Assembly, US); Baltimore Assembly, Baltimore, Maryland; Framingham Assembly, Framingham, Massachusetts; Fremont Assembly, Fremont, California; Leeds Assembly, Kansas City, Missouri

Body and chassis
- Body style: 2-door coupe 2-door sedan 4-door sedan 4-door station wagon
- Layout: FR layout
- Platform: A-body
- Related: Chevrolet Chevelle; Oldsmobile Cutlass; Buick Skylark

Powertrain
- Engine: 215 cu in (3.5 L) PMD6 I6; 230 cu in (3.8 L) OHC 6 OHC I6; 326 cu in (5.3 L) V8; 389 cu in (6.4 L) V8
- Transmission: 3-speed manual 2-speed automatic 4-speed manual 3-speed automatic

Dimensions
- Wheelbase: 115.0 in (2,921 mm)

=== 1964 ===
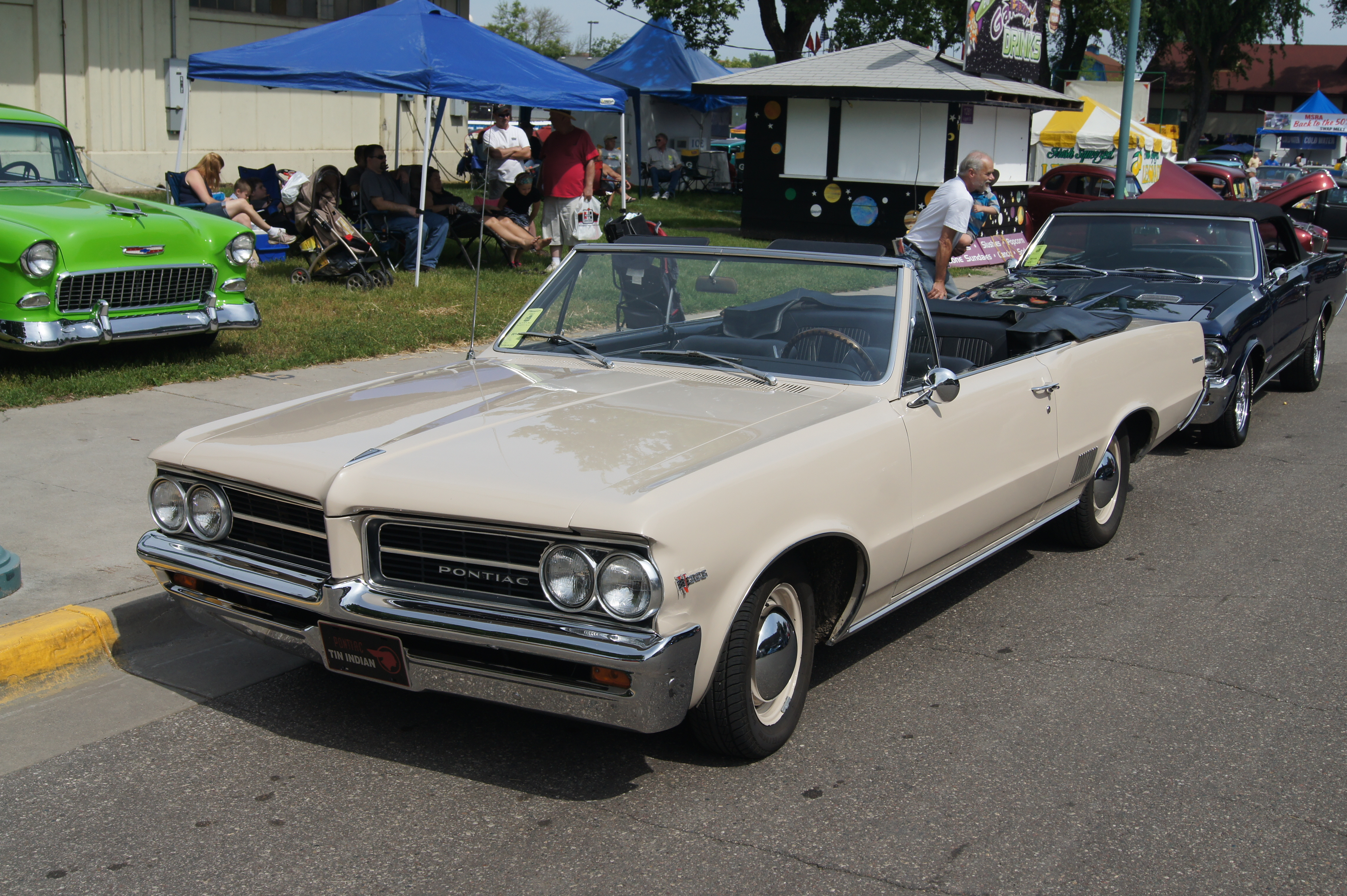
1964 LeMans Convertible

The Tempest line was changed to an intermediate-sized car on the new GM A platform for the 1964 model year. The LeMans was its own model, as in 1963, and included carpeted lower door panels, a deluxe steering wheel, courtesy lighting, and full wheel covers. For the 1964 model year, a two-door hardtop was added. A new 215 cu in (3.5 L) inline six-cylinder engine was introduced, as well as a redesigned V8 that displaced 326 cu in (5.3 L).

Shortly after the start of the 1964 model year, the LeMans became available with a new performance package designated as the GTO, or 'Gran Turismo Omologato.' The GTO option included a 389 cu in (6.4 L) V8 from the full-sized Pontiac Catalina that produces 325 hp (242 kW) with a four-barrel carburetor or 348 hp (260 kW) in the Tri-Power (three Rochester 2GC two-barrel carburetors) version.

=== 1965 ===
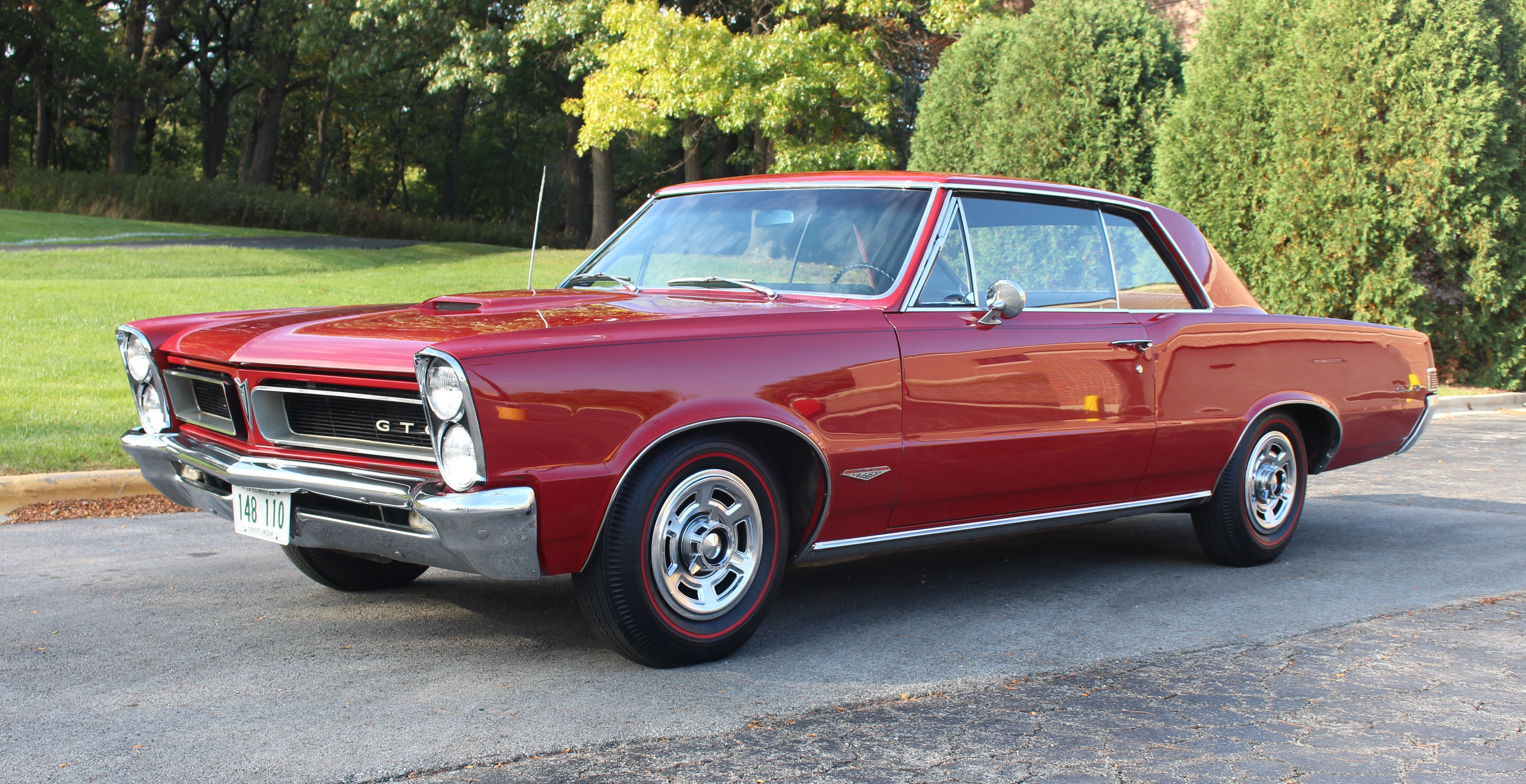
1965 Pontiac Le Mans with GTO option package

Pontiac's 1965 A-body intermediates included Tempest, Tempest Custom, Lemans, and GTO trim. The entire line was restyled, adding 3.1 inches (79 mm) to the overall length while retaining the same wheelbase and interior dimensions. The new model had Pontiac's characteristic vertically stacked quad headlights. Overall weight was increased by about 100 lb (45 kg). The dashboard design was changed, and a breakerless transistor ignition was a new option. A 326 cubic inch High Output engine was available with 4-barrel carburation for Tempest and Lemans. The 326 HO produces 285 hp (213 kW). Ratings for the GTO version were increased to 335 hp (250 kW) in the four-barrel version and 360 hp (268 kW) with the Tri-Power option. The LeMans line was expanded to include a four-door sedan for the 1965 model year.

=== 1966 ===
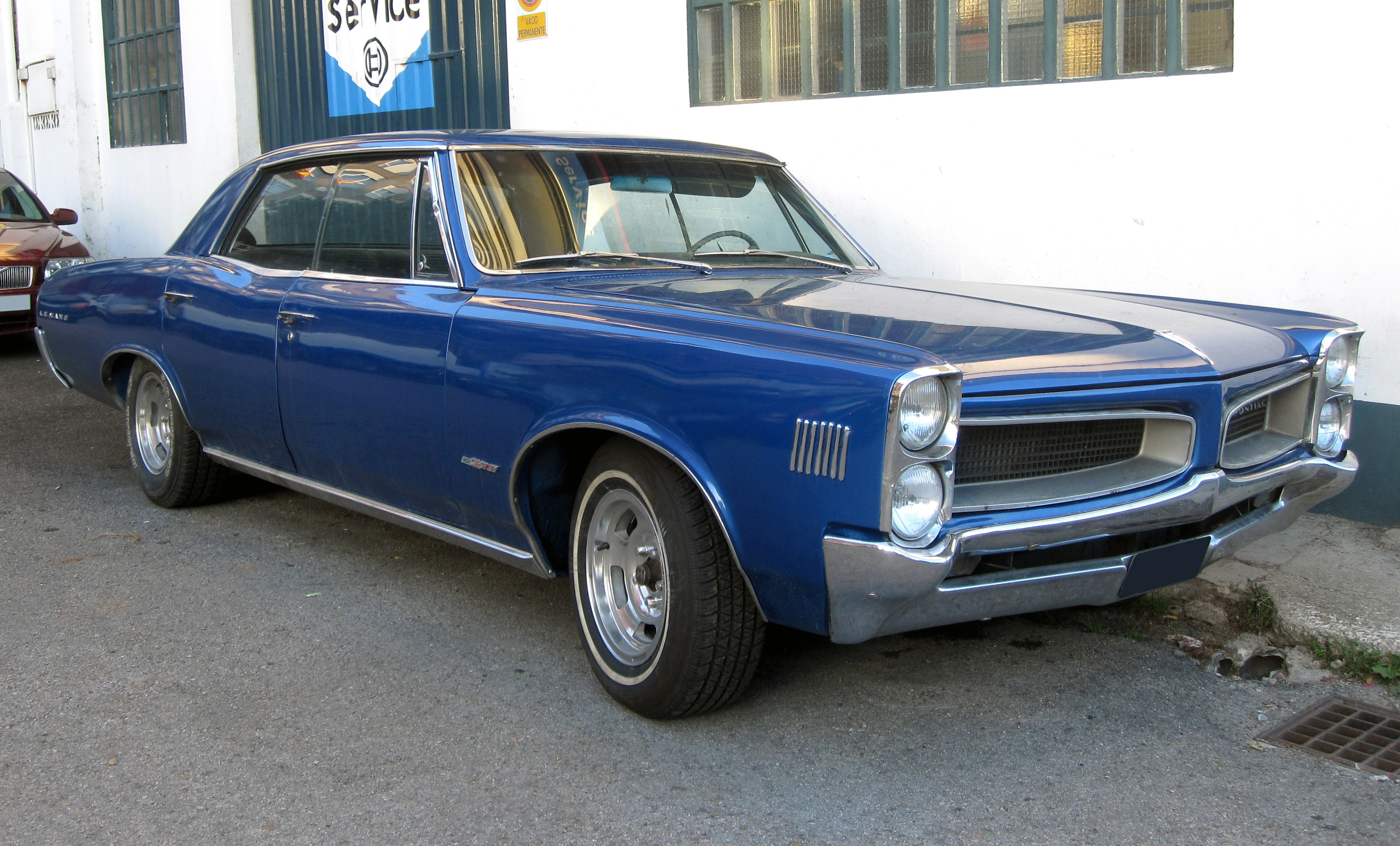
1966 Pontiac Le Mans 4-Door Hardtop (with after-market wheels)

The pillared 4-door sedan was replaced by a four-door hardtop body style for the 1966 model year.

The GTO became a separate model of its own for the 1966 model year, though retaining the same basic body as the Tempest and LeMans models. For 1966, all GM and Pontiac intermediates featured new styling featuring tunnel back rooflines on two-door hardtops and pillared coupes. While the GTO continued as a big-engined muscle car, the Tempest and LeMans models got a new SOHC 230 cu in (3.8 L) straight-six as the base engine. This engine, as well as the early Tempest with the transaxle in the rear, were ideas of Pontiac's Chief Engineer John DeLorean, who became Pontiac's general manager at the end of the 1965 model year. This engine was available in a one-barrel carbureted, 165 hp (123 kW) version as standard equipment on all Pontiac intermediates except GTOs. Optional on all Tempest and LeMans models except station wagons was a Sprint package that included a four-barrel version of the I6 that also included a higher compression ratio and hotter cam, that was rated at 207 hp (154 kW), along with an "all-syncro" floor-mounted three-speed transmission with Hurst shifter, suspension kit, and body striping. Optional were a two-barrel 326 cu in (5.3 L) V8 rated at 250 hp (186 kW) and a 285 hp (213 kW) four-barrel 326 HO V8 that included higher compression ratio and dual exhausts.

=== 1967 ===
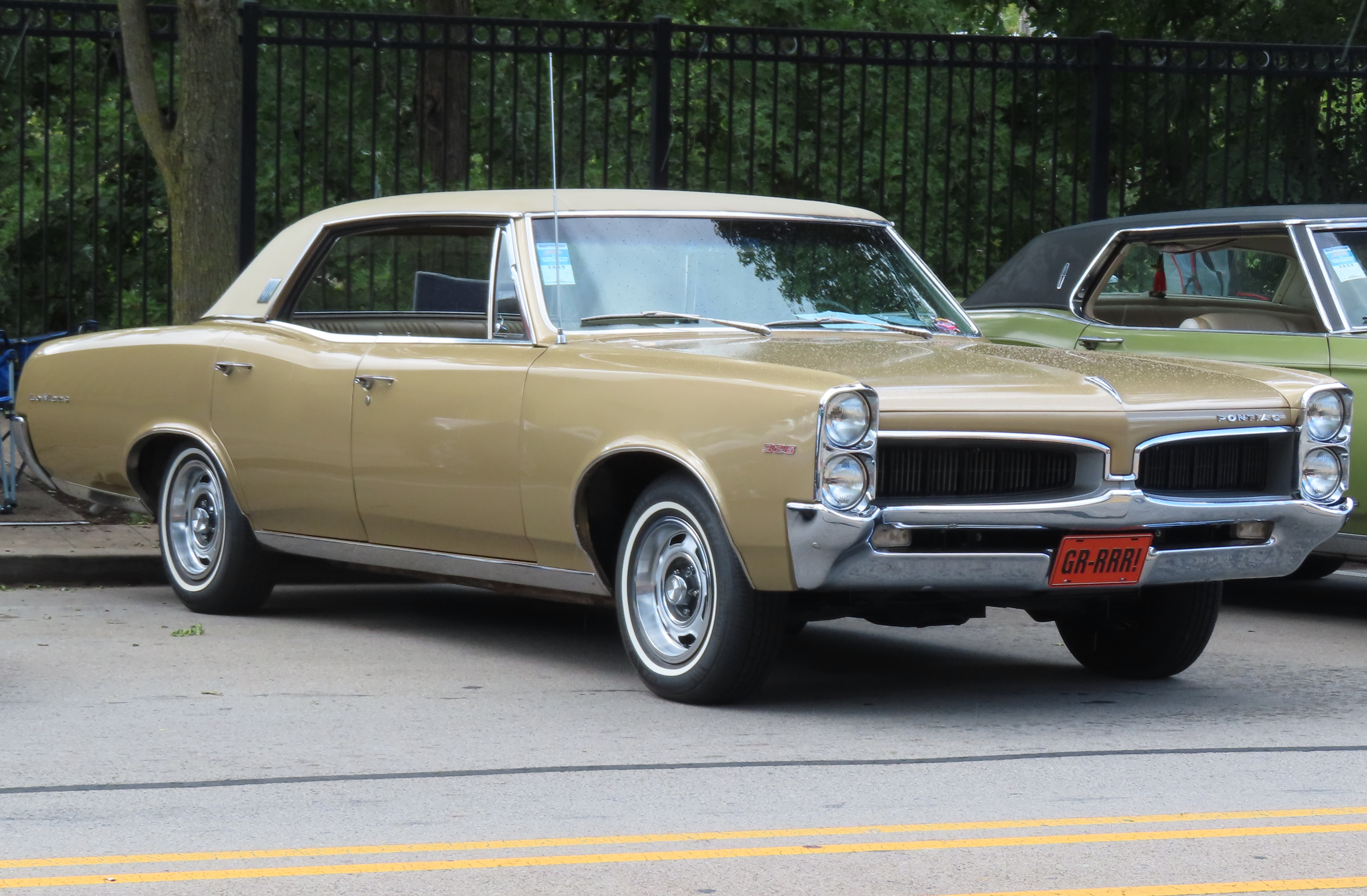
1967 Pontiac Le Mans 4-door hardtop

For 1967, peak power of the Sprint 4-bbl OHC six-cylinder increased to 215 hp (160 kW).

== Third generation (1968–1972) ==
Third generation
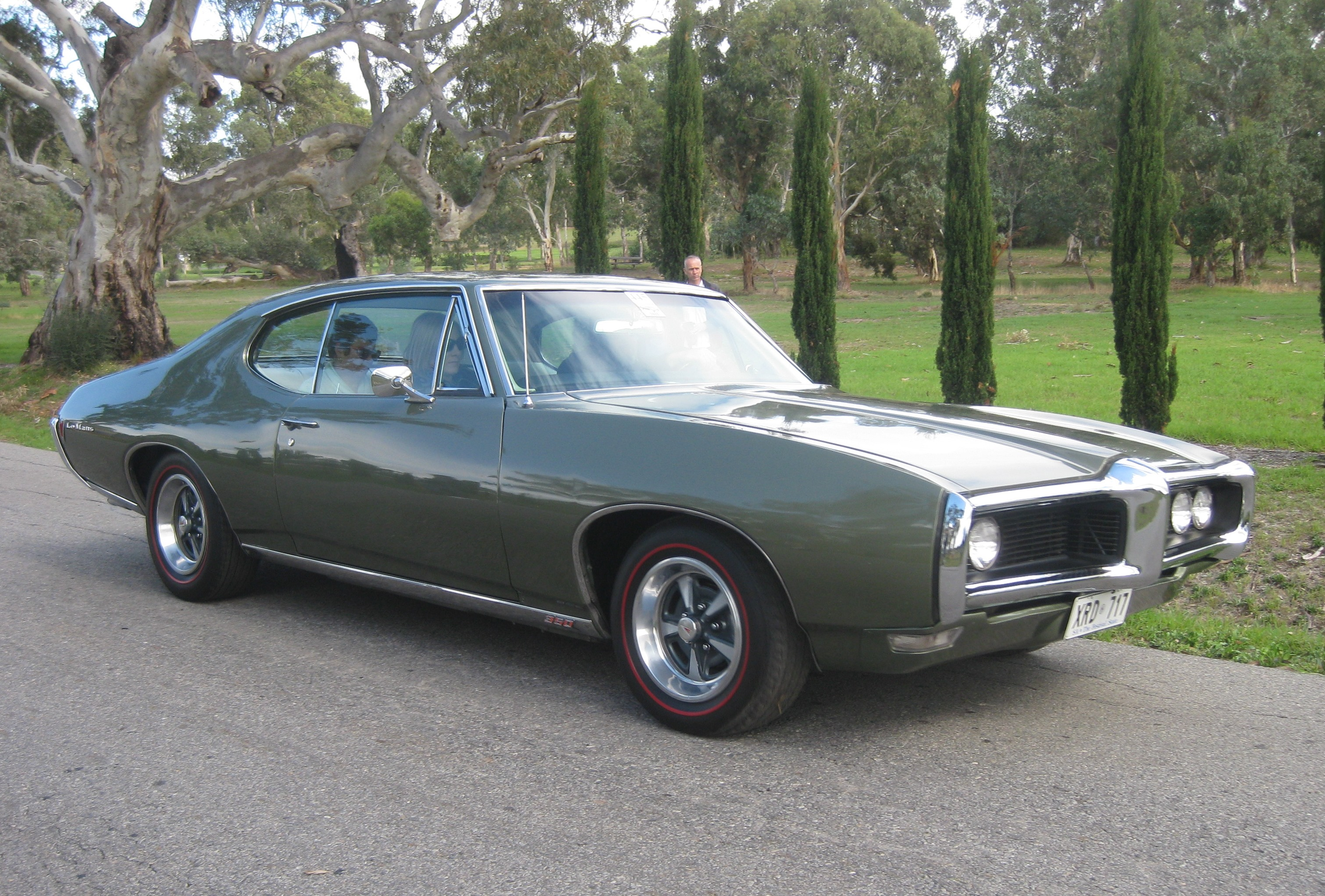
- 1968 Pontiac Le Mans hardtop coupe

Overview
- Production: 1968–1972
- Assembly: (Main Plant): Pontiac Assembly, Pontiac MI, US (Branch Assembly, US); Arlington Assembly, Arlington, Texas; Baltimore Assembly, Baltimore, Maryland; Framingham Assembly, Framingham, Massachusetts; Fremont Assembly, Fremont, California; Leeds Assembly, Kansas City, Missouri (Branch Assembly, Canada); Oshawa Car Assembly, Oshawa, Ontario

Body and chassis
- Body style: 2-door coupe 2-door hardtop 4-door sedan 4-door station wagon 2-door convertible 2-door sedan
- Layout: FR layout
- Platform: A-body
- Related: Acadian Beaumont; Chevrolet Chevelle; Oldsmobile Cutlass; Buick Skylark

Powertrain
- Engine: 250 cu in (4.1 L) OHC I6; 350 cu in (5.7 L) Small-journal V8; 400 cu in (6.6 L) Small-journal V8; 455 cu in (7.5 L) Large-journal V8

Dimensions
- Wheelbase: 112.0 in (2,845 mm)
- Length: 207.2 in (5,263 mm)

The four-door Safari station wagon became available for the 1968 model year in the Tempest line. A new engine replaced the 326. This new engine was based on all existing Pontiac engine architecture and used the 389, 400, and 326 engines' crank at 3.75" stroke, and expanding the 326's 3.72" bore to 3.875" to give 353.8 cubic inches. It was marketed by Pontiac as a 350. For 1968, the 350 was available in two versions: 265 hp (198 kW) with 2-bbl carburetor at 9.2:1 compression and 320 hp (239 kW) with 4-bbl at 10.5:1.

The OHC six-cylinder was increased from its original 230 to 250 cubic inches by lengthening the stroke. Power in base form with single barrel carburetor increased by 10 to 175 hp, but peak power for the Sprint four-barrel version remained unchanged at 215 hp.

=== 1969 ===
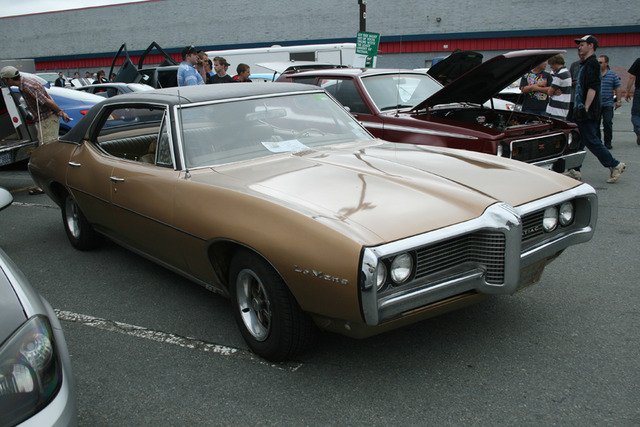
1969 Pontiac Le Mans 4-Door hardtop

For the 1969 model year, the 350 V8 engine came as 265 hp (198 kW) 2-barrel and an optional 330 hp (246 kW) 4-barrel version. The ten horsepower increase over 1968's engines was due to a different cam and the use of the #48 big valve heads, the same head used on the Ram Air 3 400-cubic inch 366 hp (273 kW) engine and the 428-HO engine at 390 hp (291 kW). The 1969 model year would be the last high-performance version of the Pontiac 350. Also in its final year, the power rating of the Sprint 250 cu in OHC six increased from 215 hp (160 kW) to 230 hp (172 kW) with manual transmissions but remained at 215 hp with automatic transmission.

The Sprint-optioned Tempest and LeMans models were not popular choices for performance enthusiasts during their four year run, being outsold by the bigger-engined GTO. The Sprint option and SOHC six-cylinder engine were discontinued after 1969, and replaced with a Chevrolet-built 250 cu in (4.1 L) OHV six-cylinder engine, becoming the base engine from 1970 until 1976 in most Pontiac intermediates.

On the exterior, vent windows were eliminated on two-door hardtops and convertibles, although they remained on two-door pillared coupes and four-doors.

=== 1970 ===
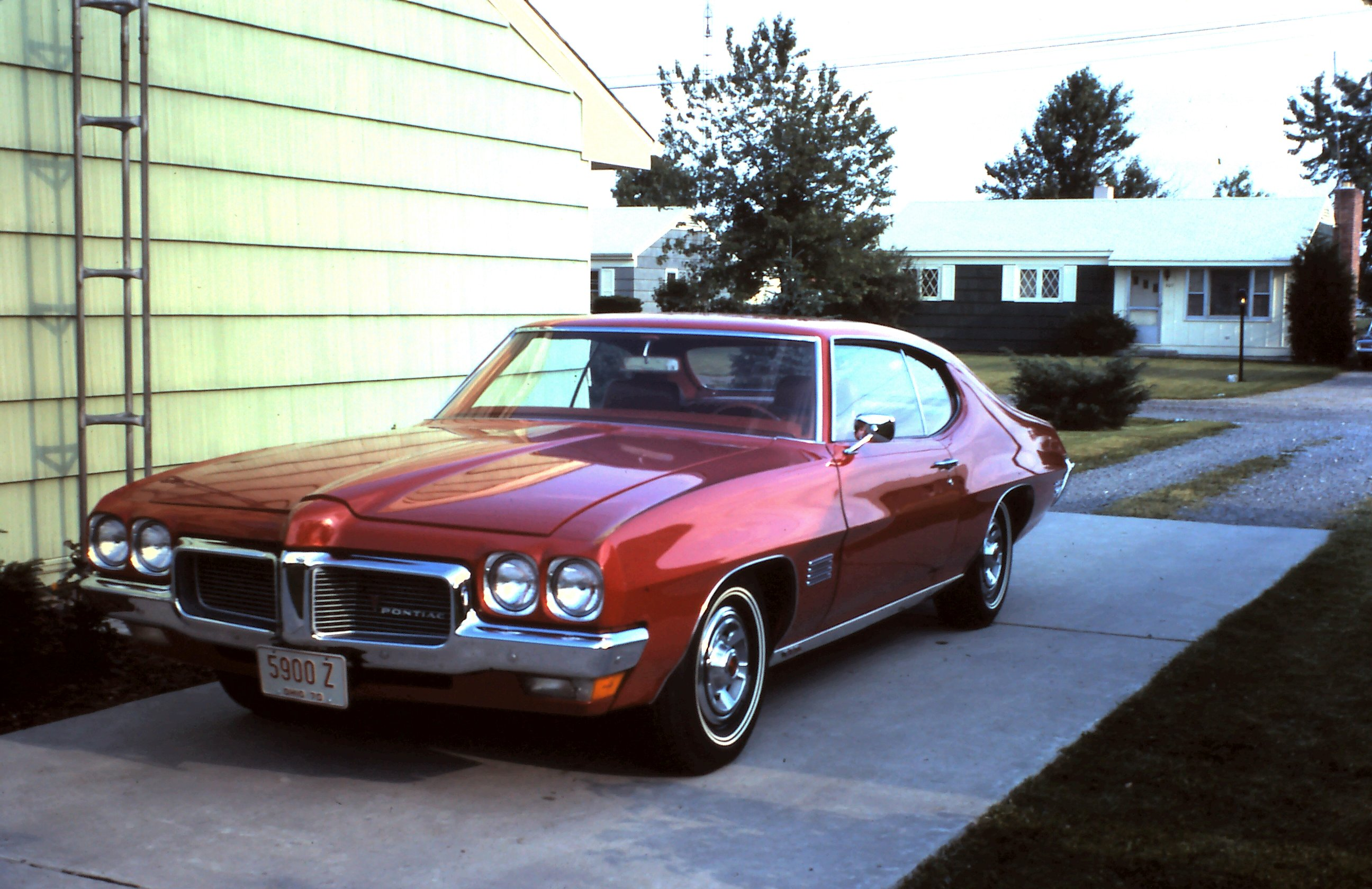
1970 Pontiac LeMans Sport coupe (front/driver side)

For 1970, Pontiac’s intermediate lineup was reshuffled to include the Tempest, Lemans, Lemans Sport, GTO and GTO Judge series. The Le Mans nameplate was downgraded to replace the sub-series previously known as the Tempest Custom, while the previous top Le Mans series was renamed the Le Mans Sport in the same three body styles as earlier, including a four-door hardtop sedan, two-door hardtop coupe and convertible. New for this year were Firebird-inspired front bumpers, wrap-around taillights, and crease-style body lines. Replacing the Pontiac-built OHC six-cylinder as the base engine for Tempest, LeMans, and LeMans Sport was Chevrolet's 250 cubic-inch straight-six engine. V8 offerings included 350 and 400-cid options with 2-barrel carburation and a 330 hp (246 kW) 400-cid 4-barrel carbureted engine with dual exhausts. The four-barrel 350 HO was discontinued.

Pontiac wanted to have a car that was less expensive than its Chevrolet counterpart, so in February 1970, Pontiac introduced the T-37 Hardtop Coupe, replacing the Tempest nameplate for the two-door pillared coupe. The T-37 was initially described as "General Motors' lowest-priced hardtop," but was undercut by a base Chevrolet Chevelle hardtop coupe introduced a few weeks later. The T-37 Coupe was followed by the introduction of a new option to the T-37, the GT-37 package. The GT-37 represented the "stripper" muscle car package. In addition to the three V8 engines, GT-37 extras included Rally II wheels sans trim rings, white letter tires, chrome-tipped dual exhaust, vinyl accents stripes, 3-speed floor shift transmission, sport mirrors, hood locking pins, and "GT-37" badging.

=== 1971 ===
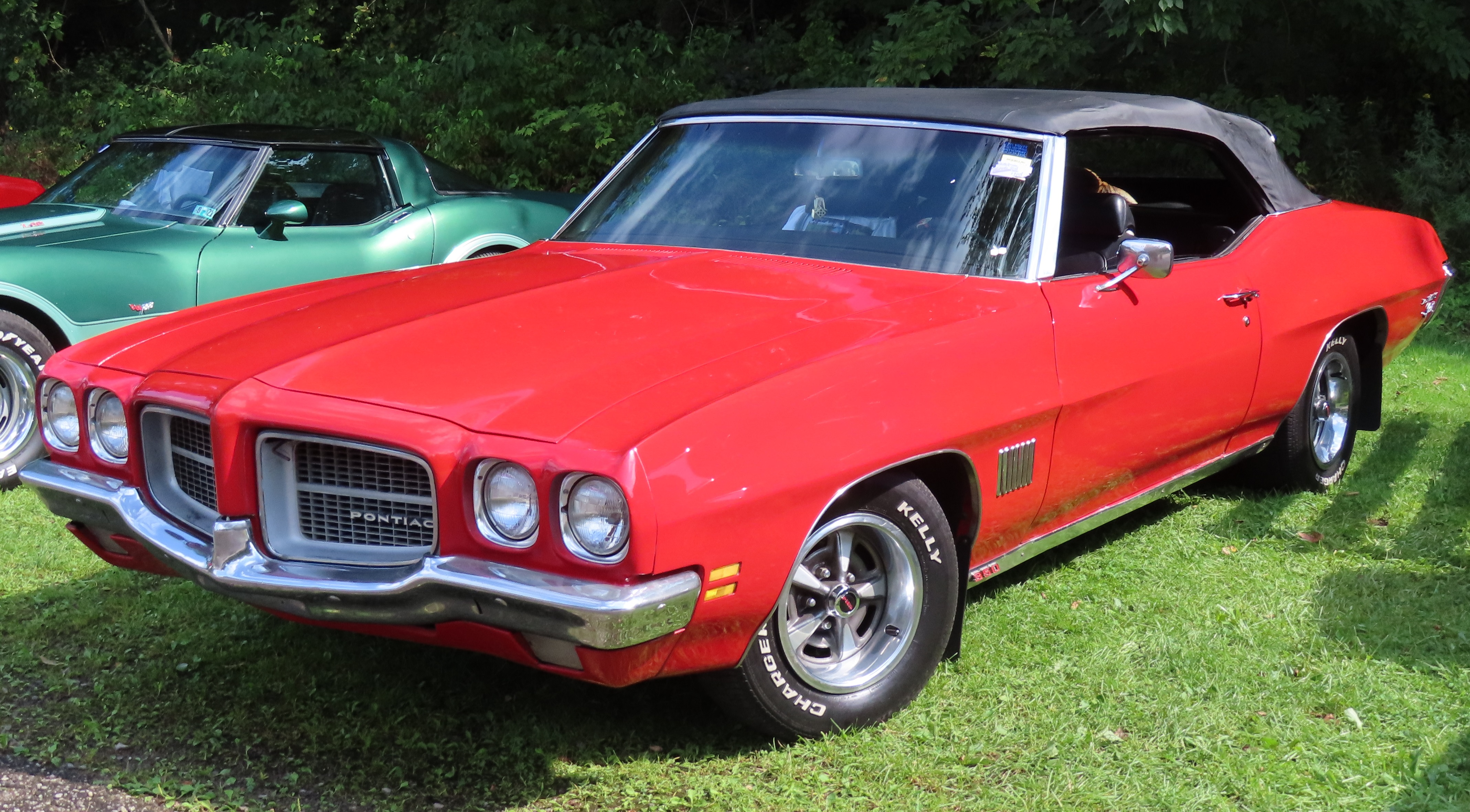
1971 Pontiac Lemans Sport convertible

For the 1971 model year, Pontiac dropped the Tempest name altogether and introduced its intermediate lineup as T-37, Lemans GT-37, Lemans, and Lemans Sport The GTO and GTO Judge were a separate line. Two-door coupes and four-door sedans were available with T-37, Lemans, and Lemans Sport. The 2-door Hardtop was available across the series, while the convertible model was limited to Lemans Sport and the GTO line. The GT-37 returned as a package to T-37 models and was marketed as "The GTO for Kids under 30." The GT-37 received the same feature package as the previous year with the exception of new eyebrow-type side striping similar to that of the GTO Judge model. In mid-March 1971, a second design change for the GT-37 switched the striping to a reflective sword-style stripe sometimes referred to as the 1971 ½ GT-37. 1971 also afforded the customer the opportunity to choose any of Pontiac's optional V8s such as 350, 400, or 455 cubic inch models, including the 455 High Output (HO) engine. The 455 had only been offered on the GTOs in 1970 and came in a 325 hp (242 kW) four-barrel version or the 335 hp (250 kW) High Output version. All 1971 engines were detuned with lower compression ratios to run on lower-octane regular leaded, low-lead, or unleaded gasoline. The brakes were 9.5-inch drums.

=== 1972 ===
For 1972, all Pontiac intermediates were now Le Mans models, and the low-priced T-37 line was replaced by a base Le Mans pillared coupe. The top-line intermediate was the Luxury Le Mans, available in hardtop sedan and coupe models, featuring upgraded interiors compared to regular Le Mans models. The Le Mans Sport was available as a two-door hardtop or convertible with Strato bucket seats and interiors from the Luxury Le Mans. The GTO was changed from a separate series back to an option package on Le Mans and Le Mans Sport coupes. Replacing the previous GT-37 option package for 1972 was the new "Le Mans GT" option, available on Le Mans pillared and hardtop coupes with any V8 ranging from the 350 two-barrel to the 455 HO four-barrel, and also included the same appearance and handling items carried over from the GT-37.

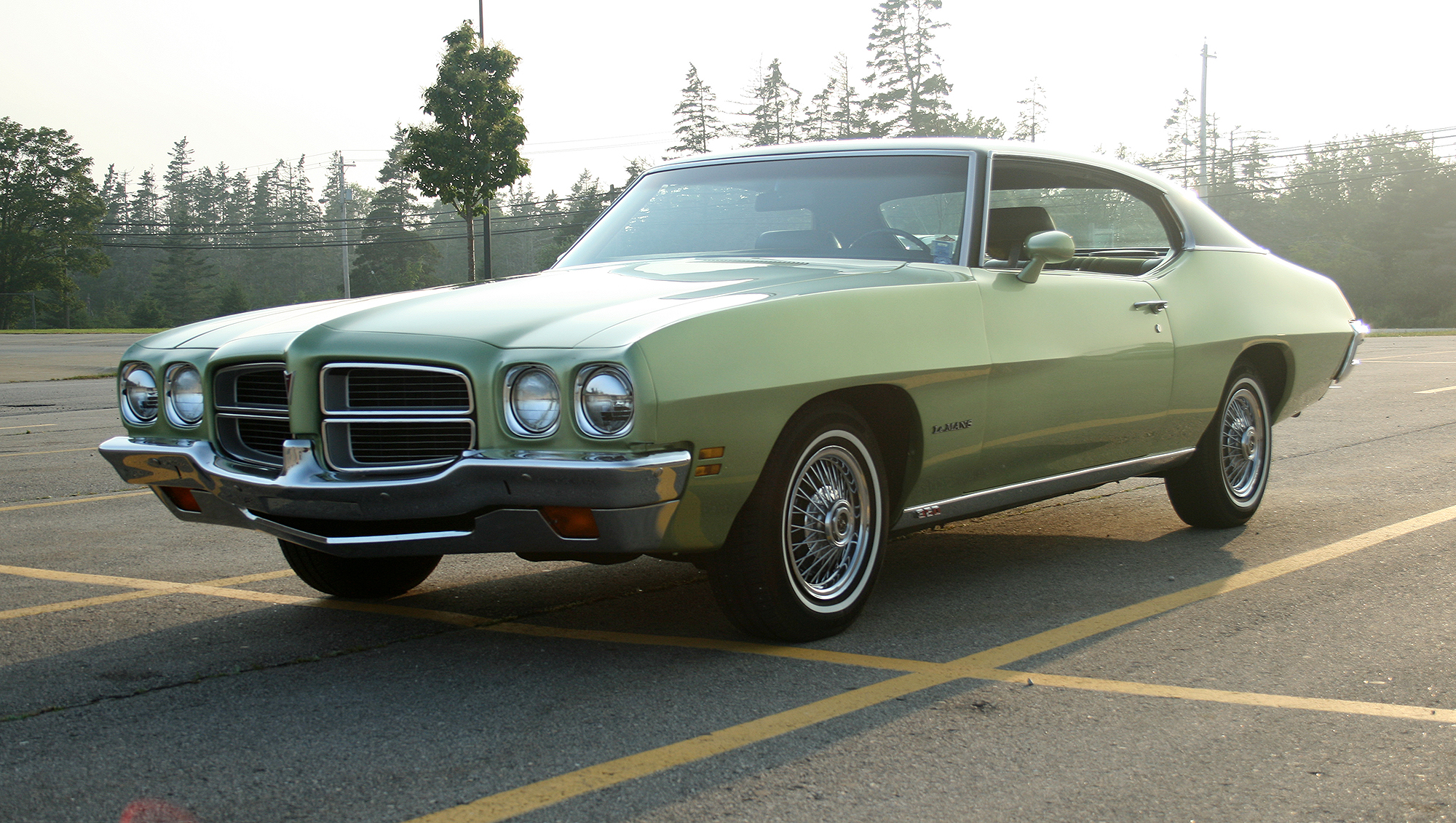
1972 Pontiac Le Mans hardtop coupe (front)

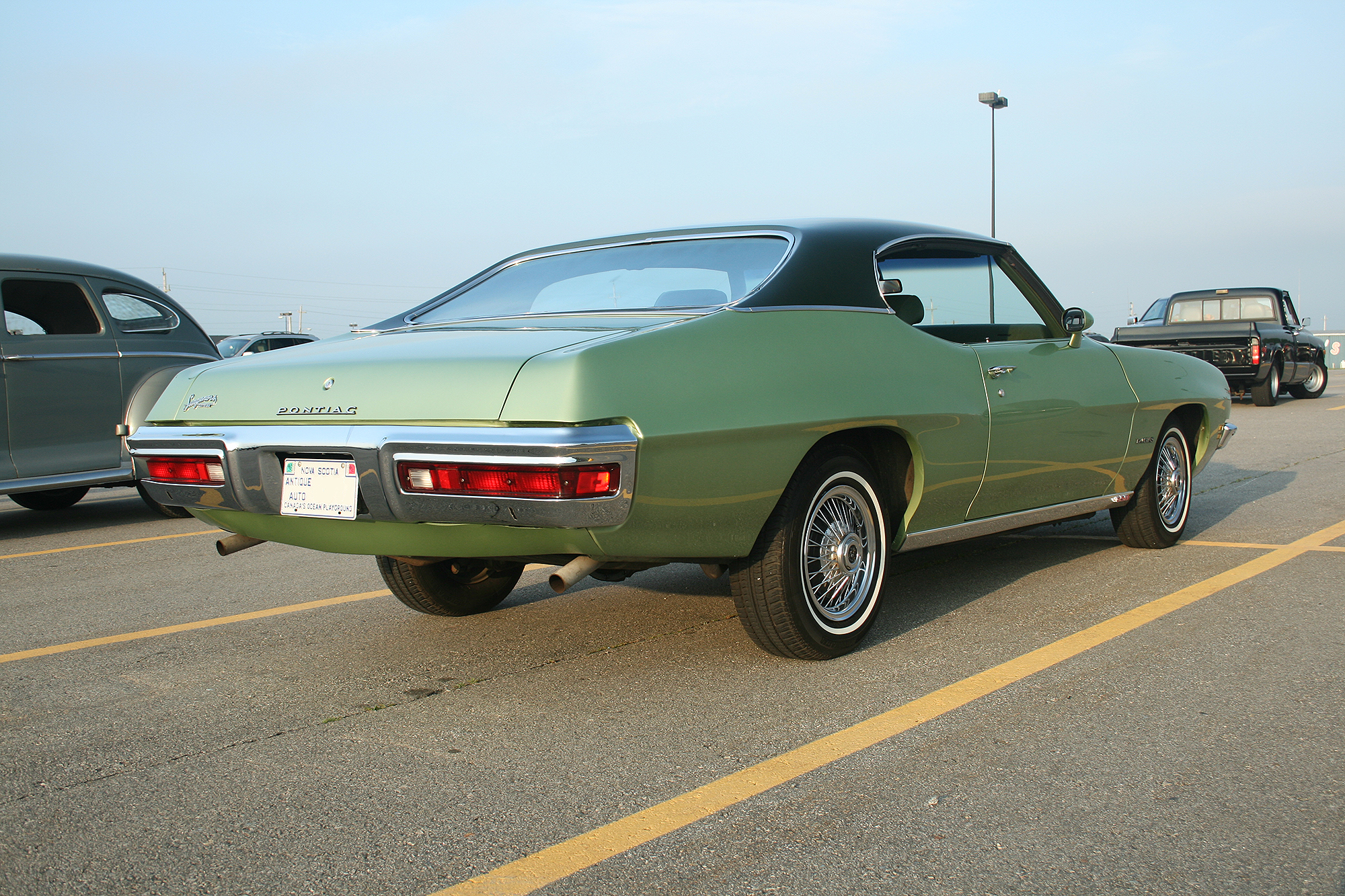
1972 Pontiac Le Mans hardtop coupe (rear)

== Fourth generation (1973–1977) ==
Fourth generation
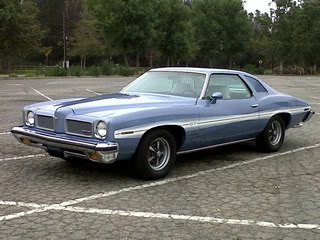
- 1973 Pontiac Le Mans 2-Door Colonnade Hardtop

Overview
- Also called: Pontiac Can Am
- Production: 1973–1977
- Assembly: Pontiac Assembly, Pontiac MI, US; Framingham Assembly, Framingham, Massachusetts; Fremont Assembly, Fremont, California; Lakewood Assembly, Atlanta, Georgia; Oshawa Car Assembly, Oshawa, Ontario, Canada

Body and chassis
- Body style: 2-door coupe 4-door sedan 4-door station wagon
- Layout: FR layout
- Platform: A-body
- Related: Buick Century; Oldsmobile Cutlass; Chevrolet Chevelle

Powertrain
- Engine: 231 cu in (3.8 L) V6; 250 cu in (4.1 L) I6; 350 cu in (5.7 L) V8; 400 cu in (6.6 L) V8; 455 cu in (7.5 L) V8; 260 cu in (4.3 L) V8; 301 cu in (4.9 L) V8; 403 cu in (6.6 L) V8
- Transmission: 3/4-speed manual 3-speed automatic

Dimensions
- Wheelbase: 112.0 in (2,845 mm) (2-door); 116.0 in (2,946 mm) (4-door)
- Length: 208.6 in (5,298 mm) (2-door); 212.6 in (5,400 mm) (4-door)
- Width: 77.7 in (1,974 mm)

From 1973 until 1977, the Le Mans and other GM intermediates were much larger in size than previous models due to evolutionary changes that resulted in larger cars year after year and federally mandated 5 mph crash bumpers that added weight and length. During this period, Pontiac's intermediate lineup included the base Le Mans, Le Mans Sport Coupe, GTO (1973 only), Luxury Le Mans (became the Grand Le Mans in 1975), the Euro-styled Grand Am from 1973 through 1975, and on the 1977 Can Am. Body styles were all based on GM's Colonnade design for both sedans and coupes (no convertibles or hardtops offered after 1972) that included center pillars for improved rollover safety standards but eliminated true hardtop design, along with frameless windows similar to a hardtop. Two-door coupes featured triangular "fixed" rear side windows that did not open, which were covered with louvers on the Le Mans, LeMans Sport Coupe, GTO sport coupes, and the new Grand Am.

=== 1973 ===
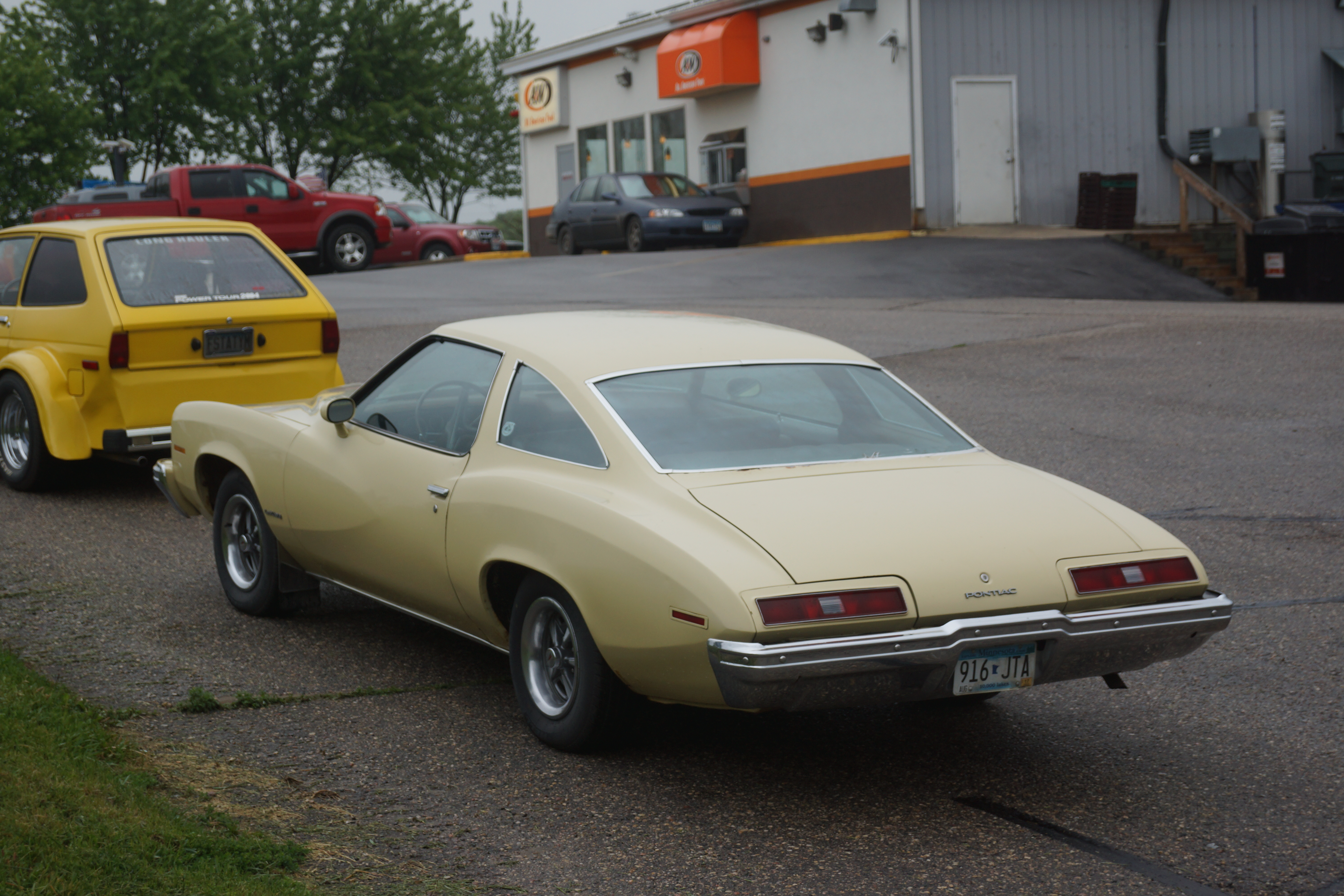
1973 Pontiac Le Mans coupe (rear)

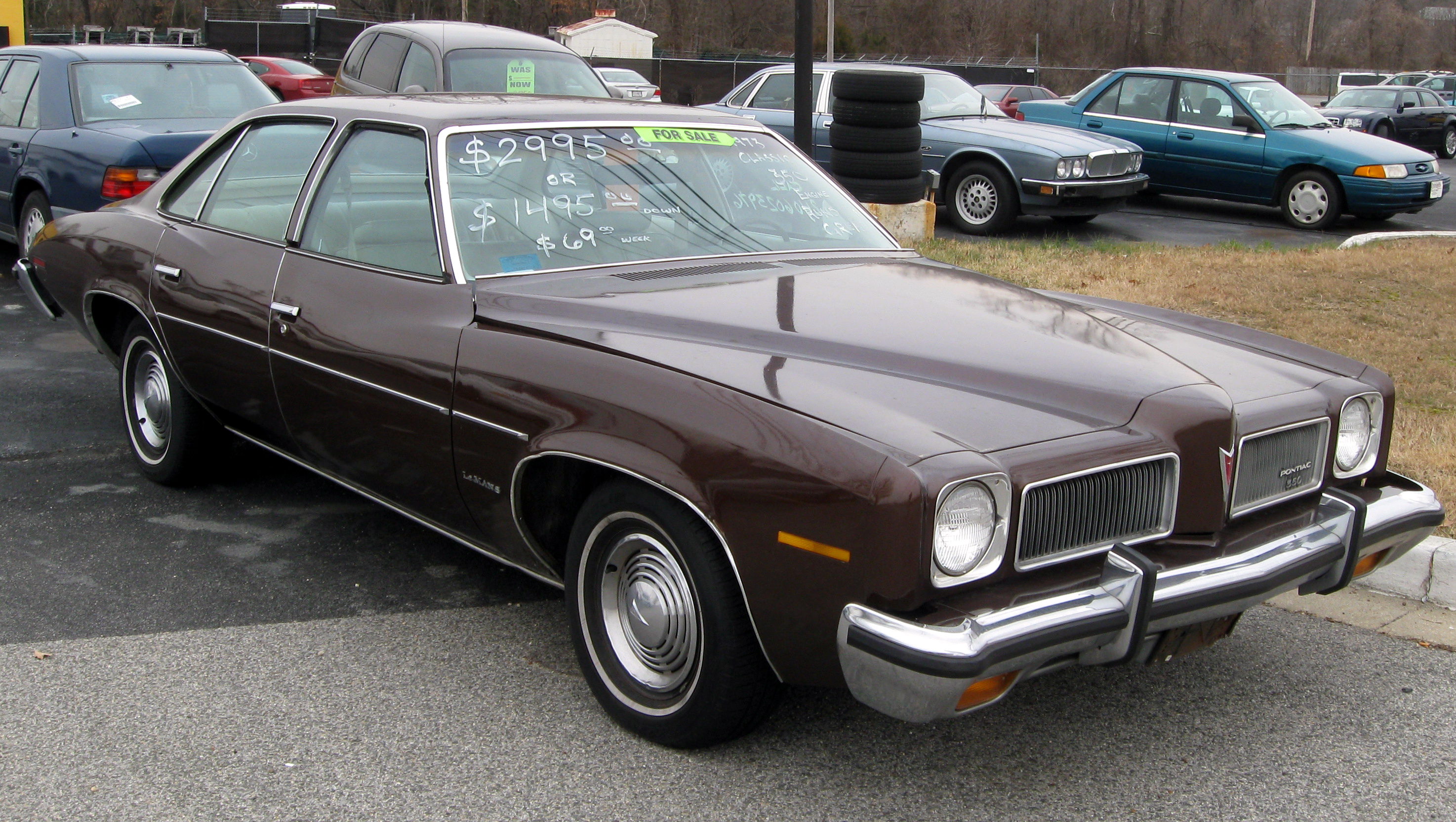
1973 Pontiac Le Mans sedan

The 1973 Le Mans, along with all other GM intermediates, was all new, but retained the same wheelbase lengths of 112 inches for two-door coupes, and 116 inches for four-door sedans and station wagons. All models featured the federally mandated 5-mile-per-hour front bumpers along with single headlights. Handling capabilities were greatly improved on all models due to new front-suspension components shared with the F-body Pontiac Firebird and Chevrolet Camaro, improved rear-coil suspension, and bias-belted tires (except Grand Am versions, which included radial tires). Engine offerings were carried over from 1972 with revisions to meet the 1973 emission requirements. Standard on base Le Mans sedans and coupes was Chevrolet's 250-cubic-inch inline six-cylinder engine, while the Le Mans Sport Coupe, Luxury Le Mans sedans and coupes, and all Safari wagons got Pontiac's 350-cubic-inch V8 with two-barrel carburetor rated at 150 hp (112 kW) standard (optional on base Le Mans models). Optionally available on Le Mans, Le Mans Sport, and Luxury Le Mans was a 400-cubic-inch V8 with two-barrel carburetor and 170 hp (127 kW), a 230 hp (172 kW) 400 four-barrel (standard with the GTO option), and a 250 hp (186 kW) 455 four-barrel were optional on all models. Planned and listed as an option for the 1973 GTO but never materialized was a 455 Super Duty V8 rated at 310 hp (231 kW) for which introduction was delayed by Pontiac management due to emission issues until the spring of 1973 and then became available only in the smaller Firebird Formula and Trans Am pony cars.

A three-speed automatic transmission was standard on Le Mans and Luxury Le Mans models while the GTO came with a floor-mounted three-speed with Hurst shifter. Available at extra cost was the three-speed Turbo Hydra-matic with all engines, while a four-speed manual with Hurst shifter was available with the 230 hp (172 kW) 400.

=== 1974 ===
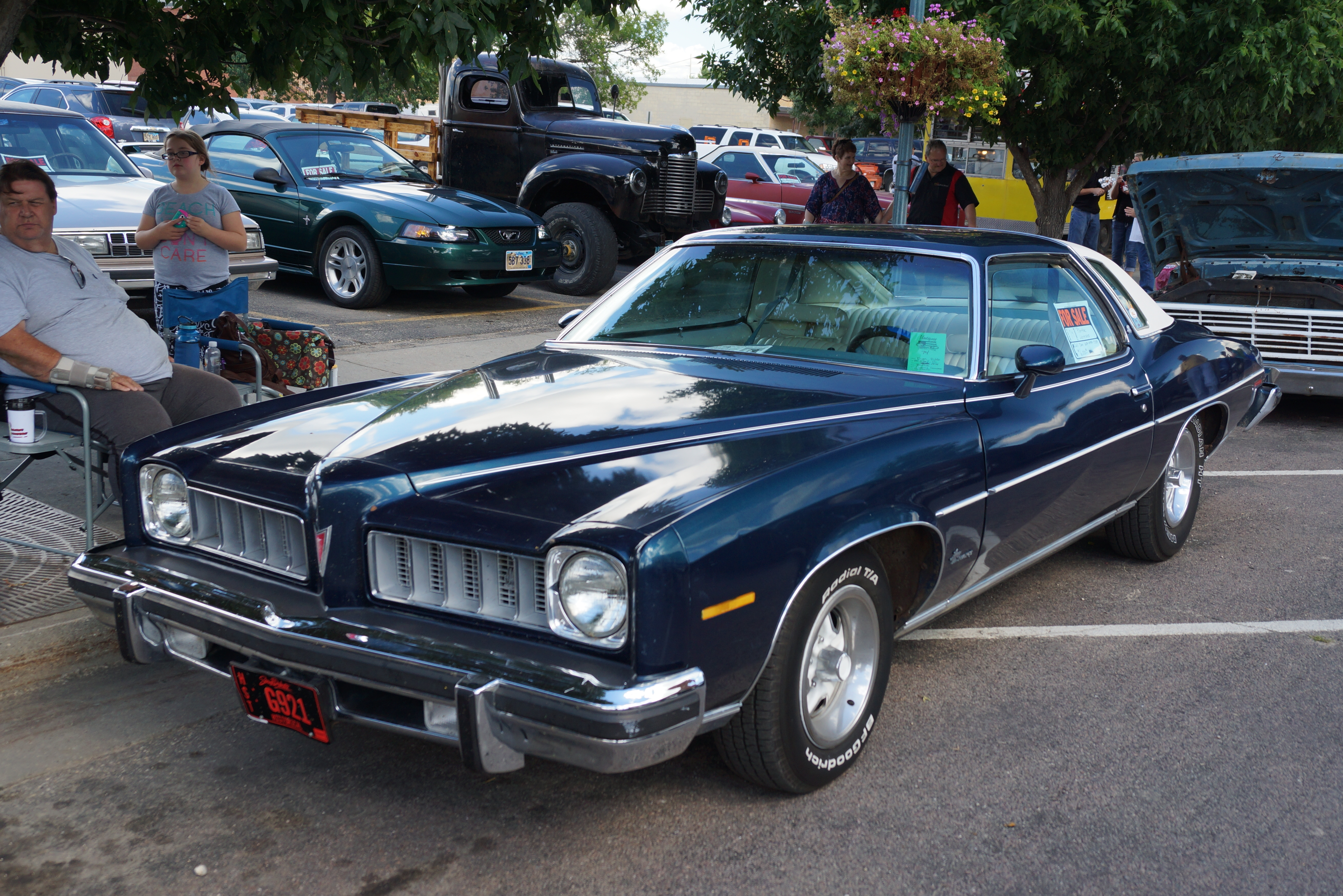
1974 Pontiac Luxury Le Mans coupe

Changes for the 1974 Le Mans included new split grilles with horizontal bars on base Le Mans and Le Mans Sport models, while Luxury Le Mans models got chromed vertical bar split grilles. Model offerings in each series were the same as 1973, except for the addition of a new Luxury Le Mans Safari wagon and the transfer of the GTO series from the intermediate line to the compact Pontiac Ventura series. The federally mandated 5-mph bumpers matched the stronger front bumpers of the previous year giving a less curvaceous rear-end treatment with vertical taillights and license plate/fuel filler moved above the bumper. Base Le Mans coupes retained the fixed full triangular rear side windows while Luxury Le Mans coupes got a smaller vertical opera window similar to the Grand Prix along with an optional Landau rear quarter vinyl roof. Le Mans Sport Coupes were now available with two rear side window treatments - the louvered triangular version carried over or the opera window with Landau vinyl roof from the Luxury Le Mans.

All engines were carried over from 1973 including the 250 inline-six, and V8s including the 350 two-barrel, 400 two- and four-barrel, and 455 four-barrel. New to the options list for 1974 was a 350 four-barrel. The same three- and four-speed manual transmissions were carried over for 1974 along with the three-speed Turbo Hydra-Matic. New to the options list for 1974 on all models were GM-specification radial-ply tires manufactured by GM's usual tire suppliers that included revised suspension tuning.

=== 1975 ===
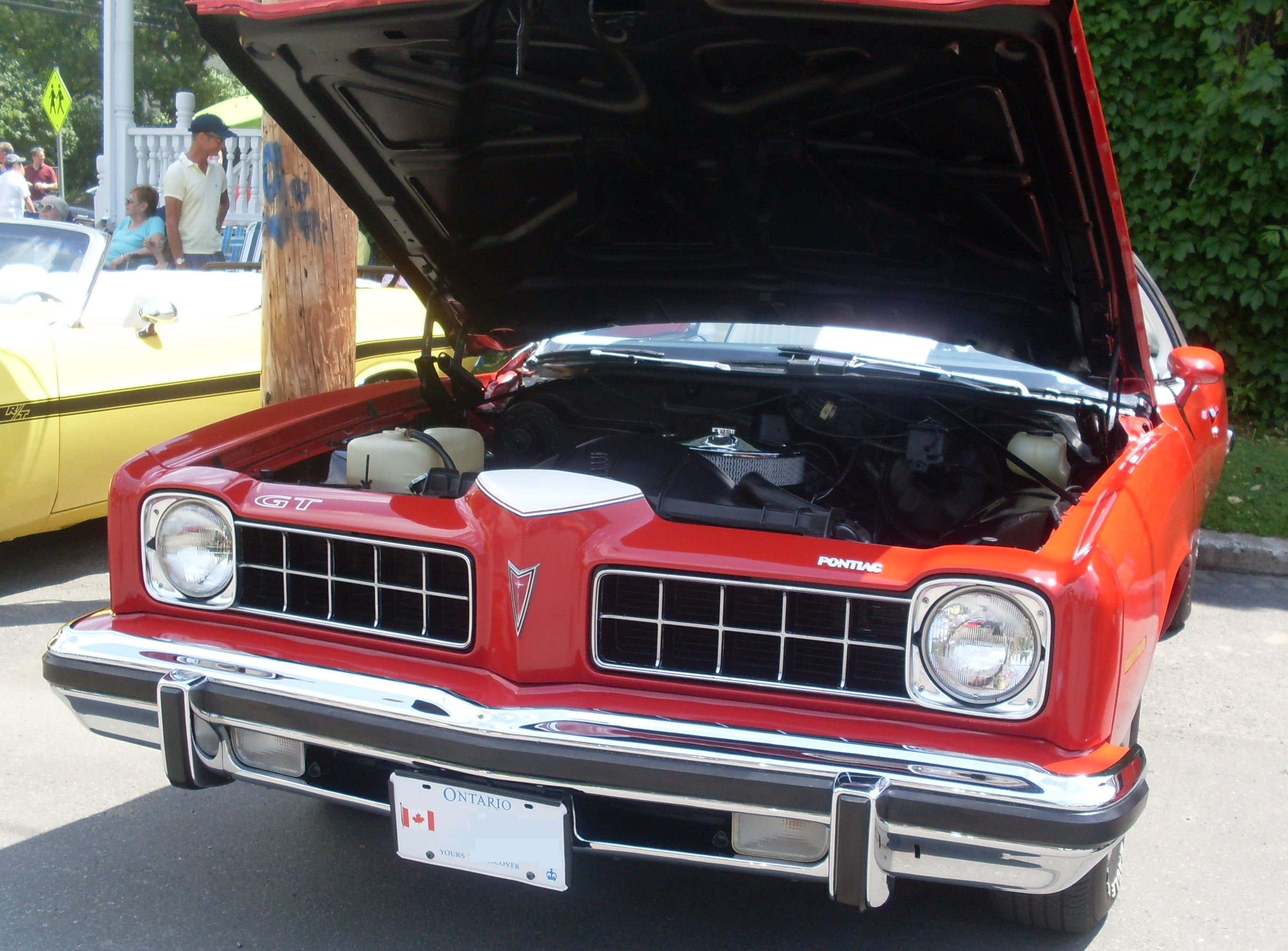
1975 Pontiac LeMans with GT Option

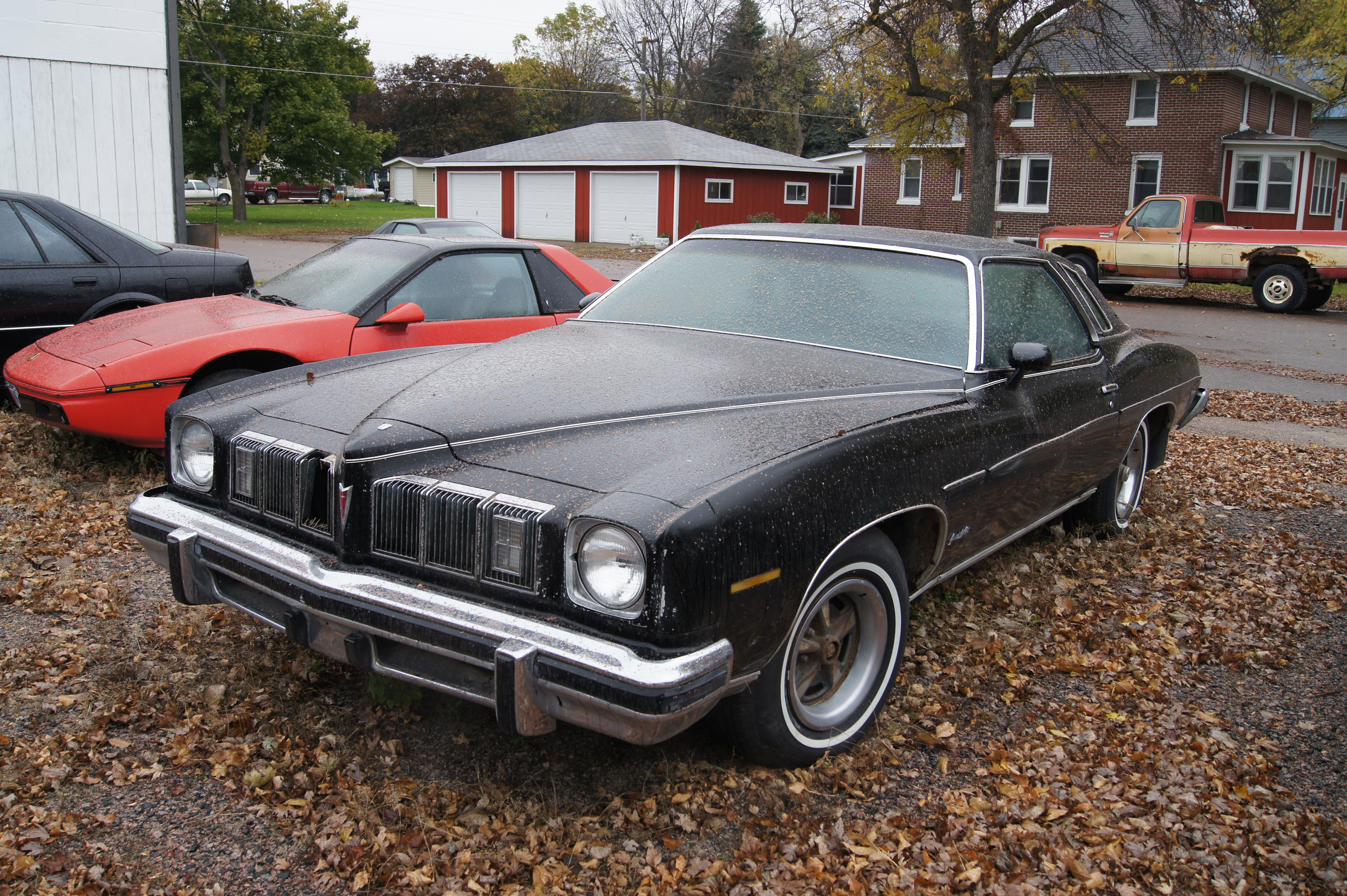
1975 Pontiac Grand LeMans 2-Door Colonnade Hardtop

The 1975 Le Mans received mostly trim changes including new crosshatch grilles on base and Sport models, and a distinctive vertical bar grille with more chrome on the Grand Le Mans (renamed from Luxury Le Mans) series cars and only revised nameplates and taillight lenses in the rear. Interiors were revised on top Grand Le Mans cars to include the distinctive wrap-around dashboard from the Grand Prix and Grand Am models with simulated African Crossfire Mahogany trim, a notchback bench seat with armrest in sedans and wagons, or a no-cost choice of the notchback bench or Strato bucket seats in coupes. Base Le Mans and Sport Coupe models carried over trim only slightly revised from 1974 including a revised Custom Cushioned steering wheel.

Pontiac's Maximum Mileage System consisted of GM's new catalytic converter that reduced emissions while improving drivability and fuel economy, a High Energy electronic ignition, and lengthened routine maintenance intervals. Radial tires were standard on all models and a "Radial Tuned Suspension" option was available that included upgraded radial tires along with front and rear sway bars.

Engines were revised for 1975 to meet that year's emission requirements and mated to the catalytic converter, which spelled the end of true dual exhausts. The 250 cubic-inch Chevy inline-six was standard on base Le Mans coupes and sedans while the 350 two-barrel V8 was optional and standard on the Le Mans Sport Coupe, and Grand Le Mans sedans and coupes, and optional engines on all of those models including a 350 four-barrel and a 400 two-barrel. Le Mans and Grand Le Mans Safari wagons came standard with a 400 four-barrel engine that was optional on other models. The 455 V8 was discontinued for all LeMans models for 1975, but was still available in the Grand Am. Transmission offerings included a three-speed manual standard with the six-cylinder and 350 two-barrel V8, with the three-speed Turbo Hydra-matic optional with those engines, a "mandatory" option with all other engines in sedans and coupes, and standard on the Safari wagons. The Hurst-shifted four-speed manual was no longer offered.

=== 1976 ===
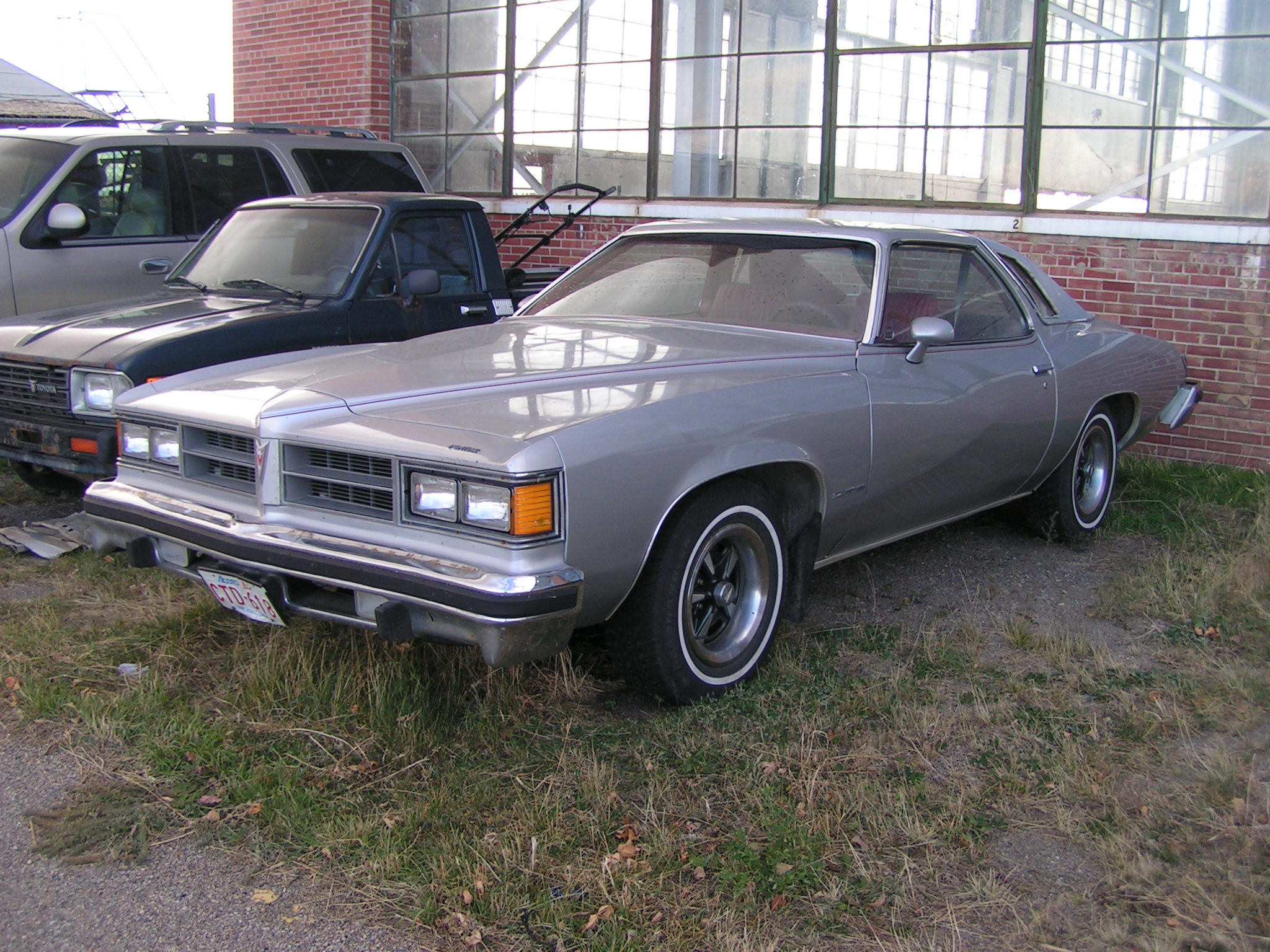
1976 Pontiac Le Mans

For 1976, the Le Mans and Grand Le Mans were the only Pontiac intermediate offerings with the discontinuation of the Grand Am series. All models received new rectangular headlights with distinct grilles unique to the base and Le Mans Sport and another one for the Grand Le Mans. The Grand Le Mans had the instrument panel of the 1973-75 Grand Am, while the Le Mans and Le Mans Sport continued with the regular dash. The 1973-75 Luxury Le Mans had the regular Le Mans instrument panel.

The Chevy-built 250 straight-six was now standard on all Le Mans and Grand Le Mans sedans and coupes along with the Le Mans Sport Coupe with V8 options including a new "Oldsmobile-built" 260 V8 and Pontiac V8s of 350 and 400 cubic inches with two- or four-barrel carburetion (400 four-barrel still standard on all Safari wagons), along with the return of the 455 four-barrel V8 after a one-year absence. The three-speed manual transmission was standard with the Chevy six with Turbo Hydra-matic optional, the latter now the only transmission offered with all V8s except the small 260 which could be ordered with a five-speed manual in the Le Mans Sport Coupe.

Also new for 1976 was an "Enforcer" police package on Le Mans sedans with either the 400 or 455 V8s that included Turbo Hydra-matic transmission, variable-ratio power steering, heavy-duty power front disc brakes, and suspension tuning.

=== 1977 ===
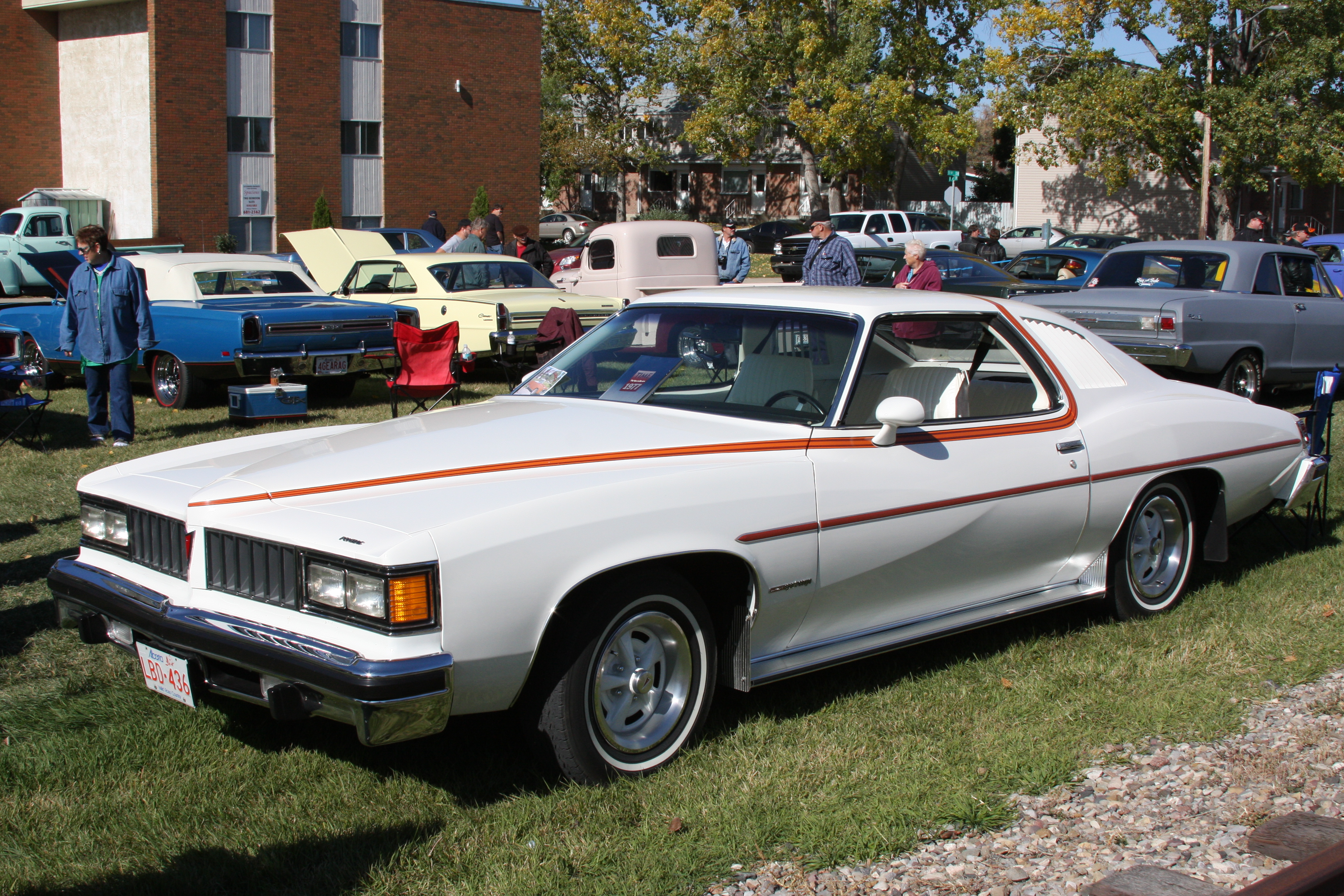
1977 Pontiac Le Mans Sport Coupe

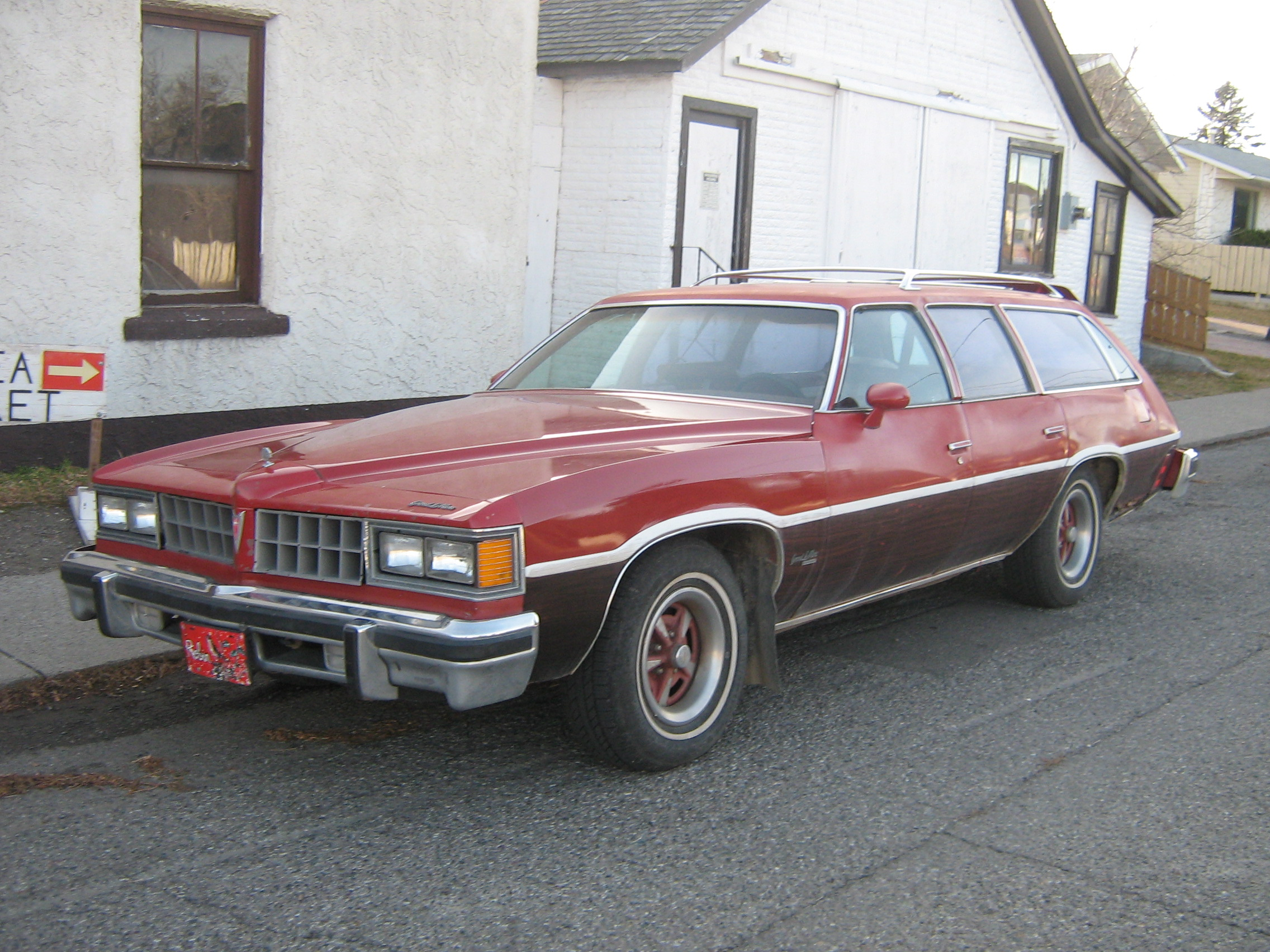
1977 Pontiac Grand Le Mans Safari wagon

The 1977 model year was the last for the Le Mans and Grand Le Mans built off the 1973-vintage Colonnade body. Appearance changes were limited to revised grilles and taillight lenses. Engine offerings were revised with Buick's 231 cubic-inch V6 replacing the Chevy inline-six as the base power plant in sedans and coupes. The base V8 (standard on Safari wagons and optional on other models) was Pontiac's new 301 cubic-inch engine based on the same V8 engine block as other Pontiac V8s but utilized many lightweight components. Optional V8s were pared down to Pontiac-built 350 and 400 four-barrel powerplants. The three-speed manual was the standard transmission on V6 models, while the Turbo Hydra-matic was optional and the only transmission available with the V8 engines. Those drivetrain offerings were available in 49 states. In California, Pontiac V8s were not offered for 1977 due to the inability to meet that state's more stringent regulations. For California, the Buick V6 was standard on most models with the available V8 engines were Oldsmobile's 350 and 403 four-barrel engines. Turbo Hydra-Matic was the only transmission offered in California.

A sporty-performance model based on the Le Mans Sport Coupe called the Pontiac Can Am was a one-year-only offering for 1977. The Can Am came standard with the 400 four-barrel V8 in 49 states or the Olds 403 four-barrel in California, along with Turbo Hydra-matic transmission, a Grand Prix instrument panel and console, Strato bucket seats, and a rear spoiler. It was partially intended as a replacement for the 1973-75 Grand Am, whose departure had caused A-body sales to drop significantly, while these Pontiac models had been the weakest sellers of the line with a high percentage of low-profit fleet sales.

For the final year of the Colonnade Le Mans models, they were joined by newly downsized B-body Catalina and Bonneville full-sized cars, which weighed a few pounds less than the "intermediates" and rode on the same 116-inch wheelbase length as the Le Mans sedans and Safari wagons and also had similar dimensions as far as length and width were concerned. The intermediates would have to wait one more year for downsizing, and although the new B-bodies made them redundant, it was still considered necessary to sell both as a hedge in case the B-body cars proved to be troublesome. In addition, many customers still preferred the Colonnade intermediates to the B-bodies and they continued to sell well for their final year, mostly thanks to the coupe models.

== Fifth generation (1978–1981) ==
Fifth generation
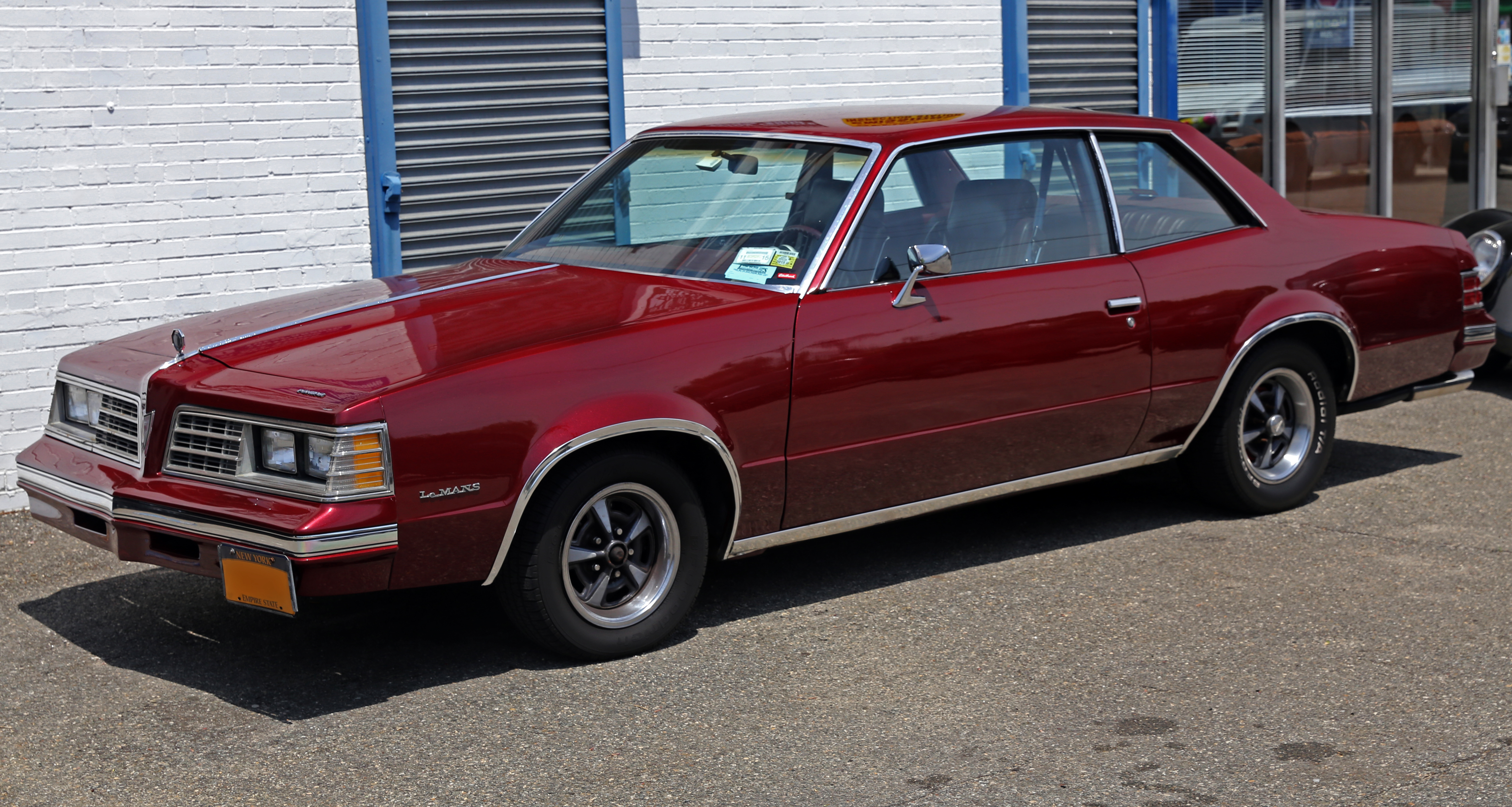
- 1981 Pontiac Le Mans Coupe

Overview
- Also called: Pontiac Bonneville; Pontiac Grand LeMans
- Production: 1978–1981; 1978–1983 (Canada)
- Assembly: Pontiac, Michigan, United States; Baltimore, Maryland, United States; Oshawa, Ontario, Canada

Body and chassis
- Body style: 2-door coupe; 4-door sedan; 5-door station wagon
- Layout: FR layout
- Platform: A-body
- Related: Buick Century; Chevrolet Malibu; Oldsmobile Cutlass; Pontiac Grand Am

Powertrain
- Engine: 229 cu in (3.8 L) Chevrolet V6; 231 cu in (3.8 L) Buick V6; 265 cu in (4.3 L) Pontiac V8; 301 cu in (4.9 L) Pontiac V8; 305 cu in (5.0 L) Chevrolet V8 (Calif.); 350 cu in (5.7 L) Chevrolet V8 (1979 station wagon)
- Transmission: 3-speed THM200 automatic 3-speed manual 4-speed manual

Dimensions
- Wheelbase: 108 in (2,743 mm)

In 1978, the Le Mans and other GM mid-sized cars were considerably downsized and lost some 600-800 lb. Pontiac's engines were also downsized, with the standard engine being the Buick 3.8 L 231 ci V6, Pontiac 265 ci V8, or optional Pontiac 4.9 L 301 ci V8 for 1978, (a Chevy 305 ci V8 in California). 1978 also saw Pontiac's 350 ci & 400 ci engine production shut down after many years of service as its hallmark V8s. A limited production run of 400ci engines was made, but were only available in 1978 and 1979 Trans Ams equipped with the four-speed manual transmission. Chevrolet's 350 V8 was available in 1979 LeMans Safaris (station wagon) only.

From 1978 through 1980, Pontiac's mid-sized lineup included the base Le Mans, Grand Le Mans, and a revived Grand Am; all available as a Coupe, Sedan or, except for Grand Am, Wagon. In 1980, the Grand Am was only offered only as a coupe, and the "Grand Am" nameplate was again discontinued until 1985, when it was used on Pontiac's new compact car — a form the Grand Am would take for the next two decades.

The final year for the mid-sized Le Mans was 1981, with sedans featuring a new formal roofline shared with their divisional counterparts. Only base and Grand Le Mans models were offered initially, joined mid-year by a new LJ trim level positioned between the base and Grand models. The car was given a new Firebird-esque slanted nose which made the 2-door coupe popular in NASCAR, especially as a superspeedway race car in 1981, which was the first year these cars were used in the series. A Le Mans driven by Cale Yarborough won the 1983 Daytona 500, and one driven by Tim Richmond at the 1983 Like Cola 500. Engine offerings by this time included Buick's 231 CID V6, Pontiac's 4.3 L 265 CID V8, Pontiac's 301 CID V8, and Chevrolet's 305 CID V8 (for California only).

=== Discontinuation ===
For the 1982 model year, General Motors revised its mid-size model lines, with particular attention focused on the Pontiac brand. In addition to the discontinuation of the LeMans, additional changes were made to reduce model overlap. As part of the 1982 introduction of the front-wheel drive A platform, the Pontiac 6000 served as the direct successor for the LeMans sedan and station wagon. Though introduced as a premium model over the LeMans, the Grand Prix coupe continued in production (on the re-designated G platform), accommodating the withdrawal of the LeMans coupe.

The Grand LeMans itself was not directly replaced for 1982, though its withdrawal was accommodated through a revision to both the G platform and the full-size B platform. Rather than undergo an expensive redesign to downsize the vehicle, Pontiac moved the Bonneville nameplate from its full-size line to the G-body four-door sedan. Sharing the newly-introduced notchback body (for 1981) of the four-door Buick Regal, Oldsmobile Cutlass, and Chevrolet Malibu, the Bonneville was slotted above the 6000 in the Pontiac model line, receiving many of the styling elements of its B-body predecessor. In Canada, Pontiac continued to use the Grand LeMans name for the G-body Bonneville through the 1983 model year. As part of the model revision, the previous Catalina/Bonneville full-size line was replaced by the Pontiac Parisienne (the nameplate used for the Bonneville by GM Canada), adopting a minor styling revision.

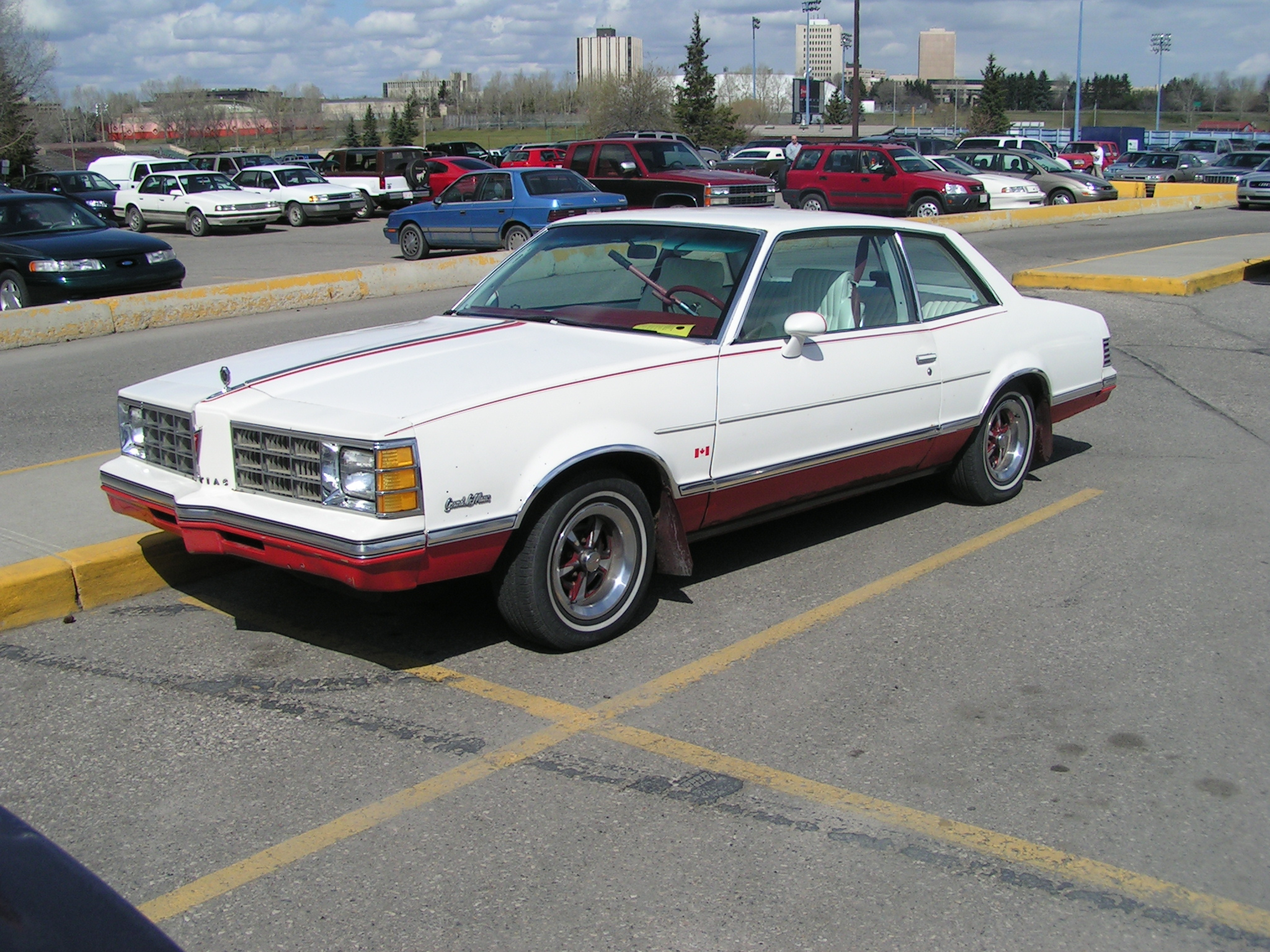
1978 Pontiac Grand LeMans 2-Door Coupe

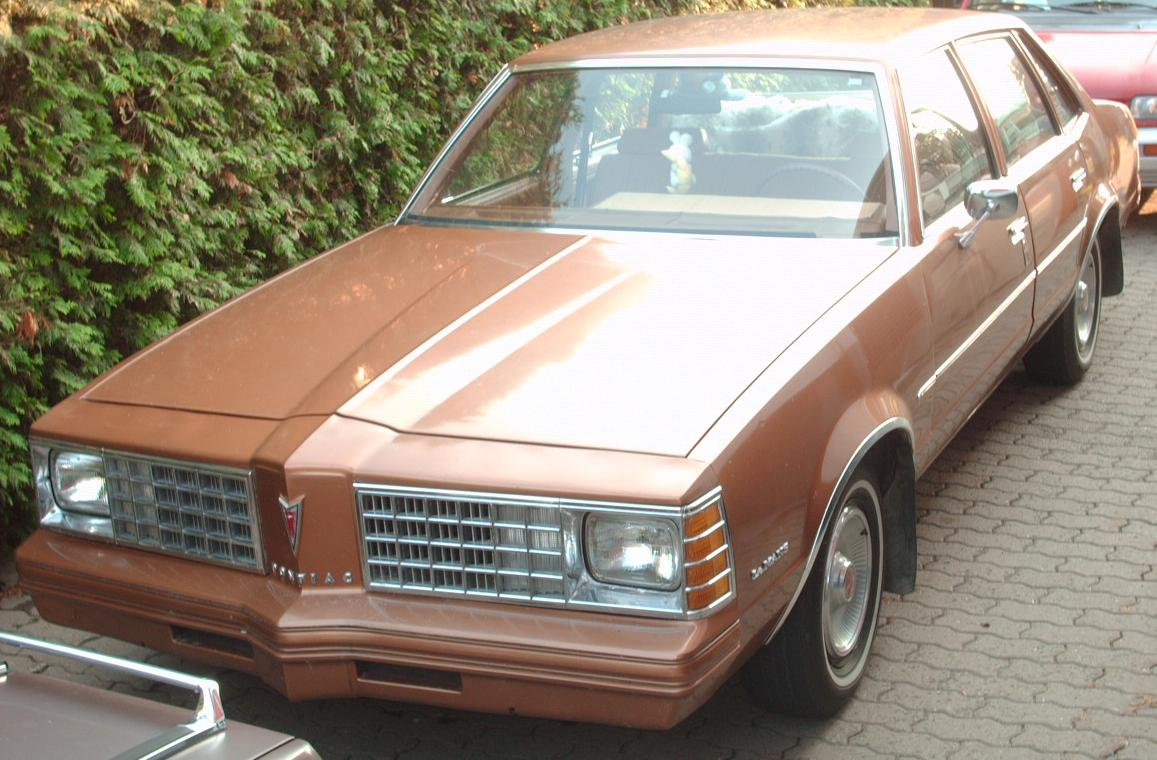
1979 Pontiac Le Mans Sedan

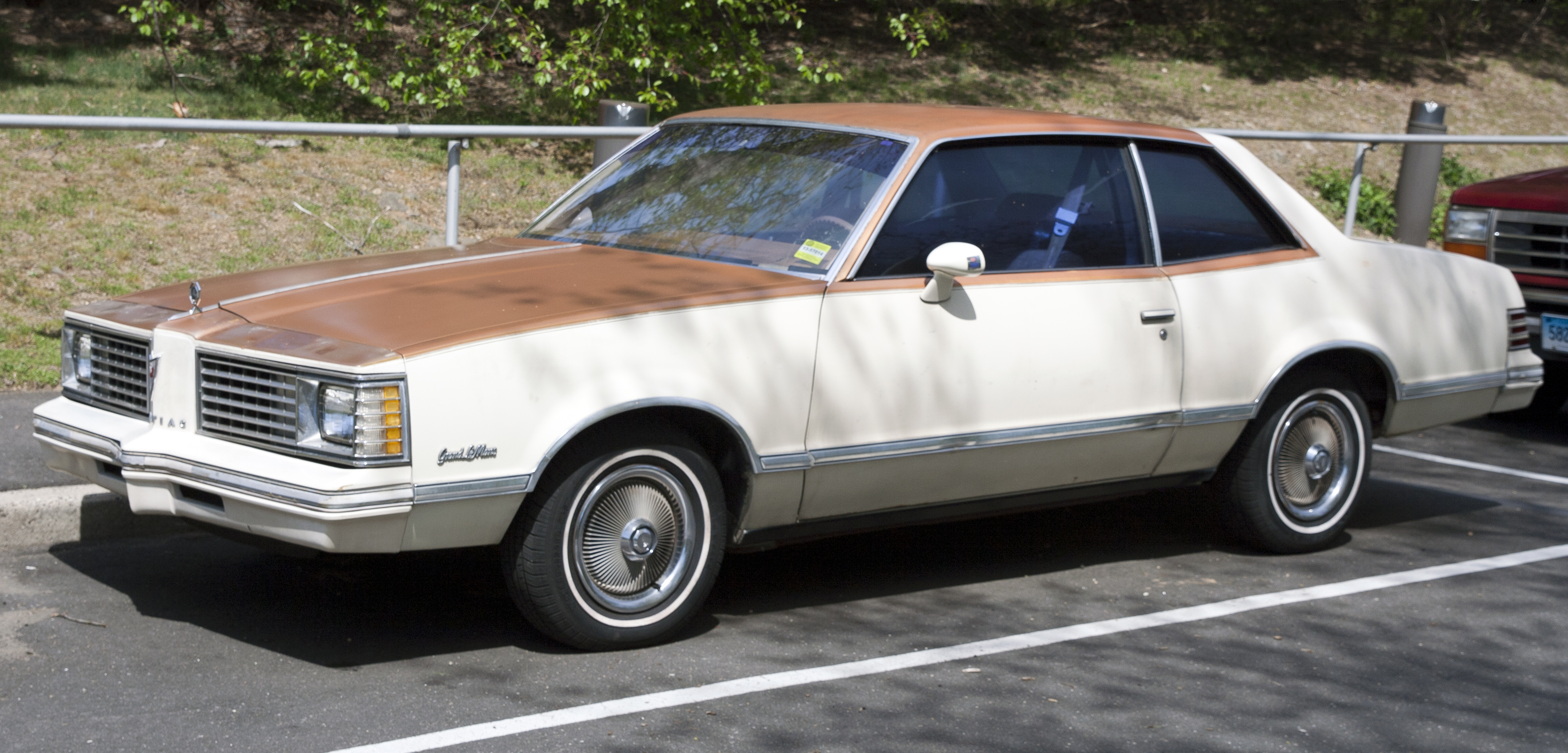
1980 Pontiac Grand Le Mans Coupe

== Sixth generation (1988–1993) ==
Daewoo LeMans
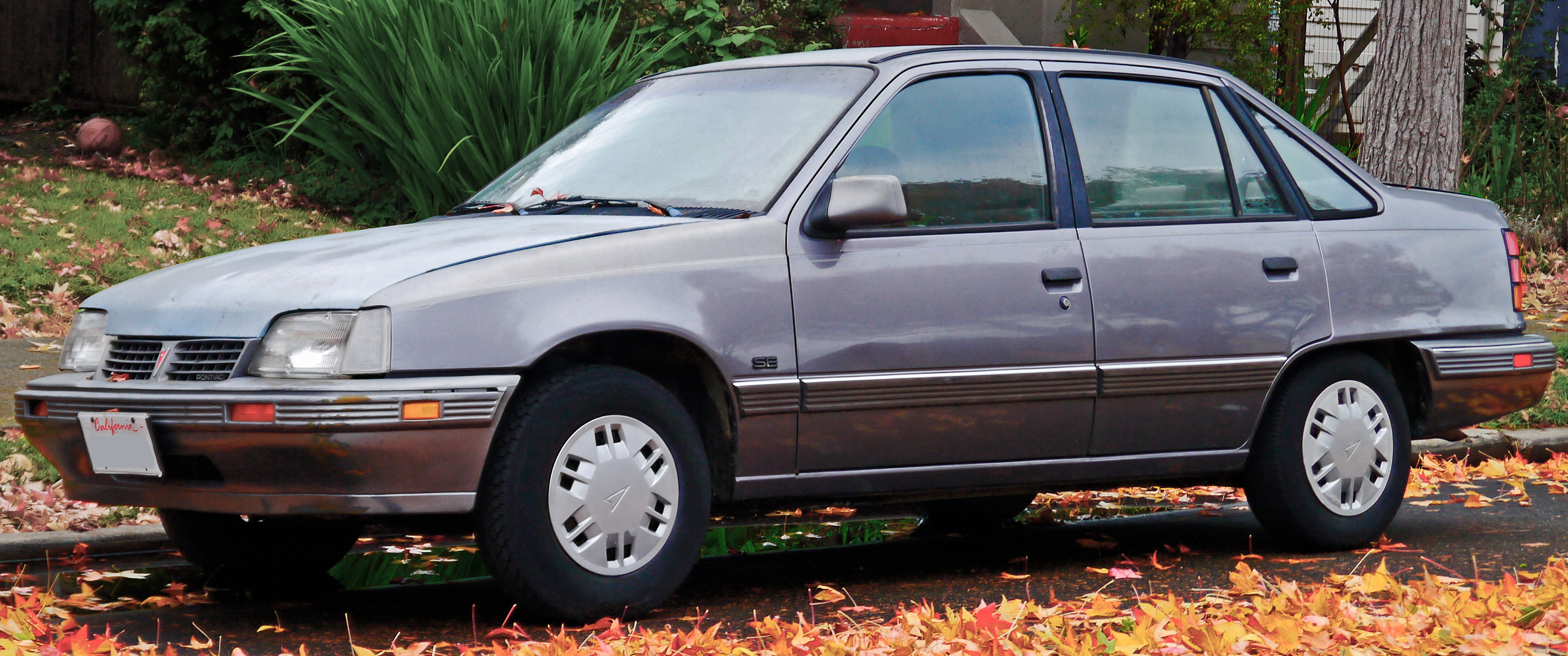
- 1988 Pontiac LeMans sedan

Overview
- Also called: Asüna GT/SE (Canada, 1993); Passport Optima (Canada, 1988–1991)
- Production: 1987–1993
- Model years: 1988–1993
- Assembly: South Korea: Bupyeong, Incheon

Body and chassis
- Class: Subcompact
- Body style: 3-door hatchback 5-door hatchback (NZ); 4-door sedan
- Layout: Front-engine, front-wheel-drive
- Platform: GM T platform
- Related: Daewoo LeMans/Racer; Opel Kadett E

Powertrain
- Engine: 1.6 L L73 I4; 2.0 L LT2 I4
- Transmission: 4/5-speed manual 3-speed automatic

Dimensions
- Wheelbase: 2,520 mm (99.2 in)
- Width: 1,662 mm (65.4 in)
- Height: 1,393 mm (54.8 in)

Chronology
- Predecessor: Pontiac 1000

For the 1988 model year, Pontiac revived the LeMans nameplate in North America, replacing the Pontiac 1000 as the smallest Pontiac model line. It was an early introduction for the model year, with sales beginning in June 1987. Marking the switch of the subcompact T-body to front-wheel drive in North America, the LeMans was a captive import of the Daewoo LeMans from South Korea, offered in three-door hatchback (called the "Aerocoupe") and four-door sedan body styles (a five-door hatchback was also offered in New Zealand). The joint venture with Daewoo, in which the two companies built a new factory expressly to assemble the new T-car, had been announced in January 1984 but was delayed due to a period of political turmoil.

The throttle body injected 1.6-liter engine producing 74 hp (55 kW) at 5,600 rpm was also an Opel design, built in South Korea. The introductory lineup all had this engine and consisted of the Value Leader ("VL", only as a three-door Aerocoupe), the standard LeMans (Sedan or Aerocoupe), and the SE (Sedan only) on top. A four-speed manual was standard equipment, with a five-speed version (standard on the SE) and a three-speed automatic optionally available. The LeMans was also sold in Canada through General Motors' Passport International Division as the "Passport Optima."

In February 1988, a new model was released, going on sale the following month: the new sportier Pontiac LeMans GSE Aerocoupe, positioned similarly to the Opel Kadett GSi, was equipped with an Australian-built 95 hp (71 kW) 2.0 L four-cylinder engine also used in the Pontiac Sunbird. Unlike the Kadett GSi, however, the GSE only had throttle body injection and its maximum power was at 4,800 rpm. The GSE was available in red, white, or silver with 14 inch alloy wheels, fog lights, and a rear spoiler. The GSE also received the Recaro-style seats of the Kadett GSi. The five-speed manual transmission used with the larger engine was an Opel design, built in Japan by Isuzu. This version was sold in Canada as the Passport Optima GSi. Along with the introduction of the GSE, the Pontiac LeMans SE sedan now featured the GSE's 2.0 L four-cylinder engine while the earlier base model was renamed LE; the LE received the five-speed manual as standard equipment, leaving the four-speed for the VL only. The 2.0 L SE Sedan was dropped after the 1989 model year.

The GSE seemed good on paper, but it cost more than the Honda Civic Si and more than a Sunbird with the same engine, while the LeMans' reputation for troubled quality also did it no favors. The less-than-peppy engine combined with low-geared steering and a vague shift linkage meant that its performance did not match the sporty exterior; it had better gas mileage than many of its competitors but that did not help create a youthful image. For 1990, Pontiac added quicker steering on the GSE but the model did not return for 1991. This left the Base model (3-door only) and the LE (both body styles).

For the 1992 model year the LeMans received some very minor changes including amber turn signals at the rear and a new color (Bright Yellow). The lineup was renamed SE "Value Leader" Aerocoupe, with the better-equipped version called SE (Aerocoupe/Sedan). Model year sales dropped to under 20,000 cars, a far cry from the planned 90,000 per year. For 1993 the LeMans received a facelift, with a reworked front, new side moldings, and superficially changed taillights. The mechanical parts, however, remained mostly as they had been in 1987. This version was called the Asüna SE/GT in the Canadian market, where it replaced the Passport Optima. The SE was available as a three-door hatchback or four-door sedan, while the sporty and better-equipped GT only came as a hatchback. The Asüna SE and GT were only available for the 1993 model year; in 1994, the Asüna brand was discontinued altogether. In North America, poor build quality tarnished sales as well as the relationship between the companies. Daewoo's joint venture with General Motors ended in 1992, and the Pontiac LeMans (and Asüna SE/GT) were discontinued after the 1993 model year with no replacement, ending the final use of the LeMans nameplate.

In 1994, Daewoo updated the LeMans/Racer and renamed it the Cielo; the model line continued to be built in numerous countries until 2016. In North America, Pontiac left the subcompact segment until 2005, when they introduced a rebadged Chevrolet Aveo four-door in Canada as the Pontiac Wave. This was replaced by the Pontiac G3 hatchback for 2009; this was briefly marketed in the United States as well. In 2010 (the final year of Pontiac), the G3 was available only in Canada.

=== New Zealand ===
It was also sold in New Zealand as the Pontiac LeMans from 1989, becoming the first Pontiac badged car to be sold on the NZ market since the Canadian-sourced Pontiac Laurentian of the 1960s. In addition to the body styles available in North America, New Zealand also received the five-door hatchback.

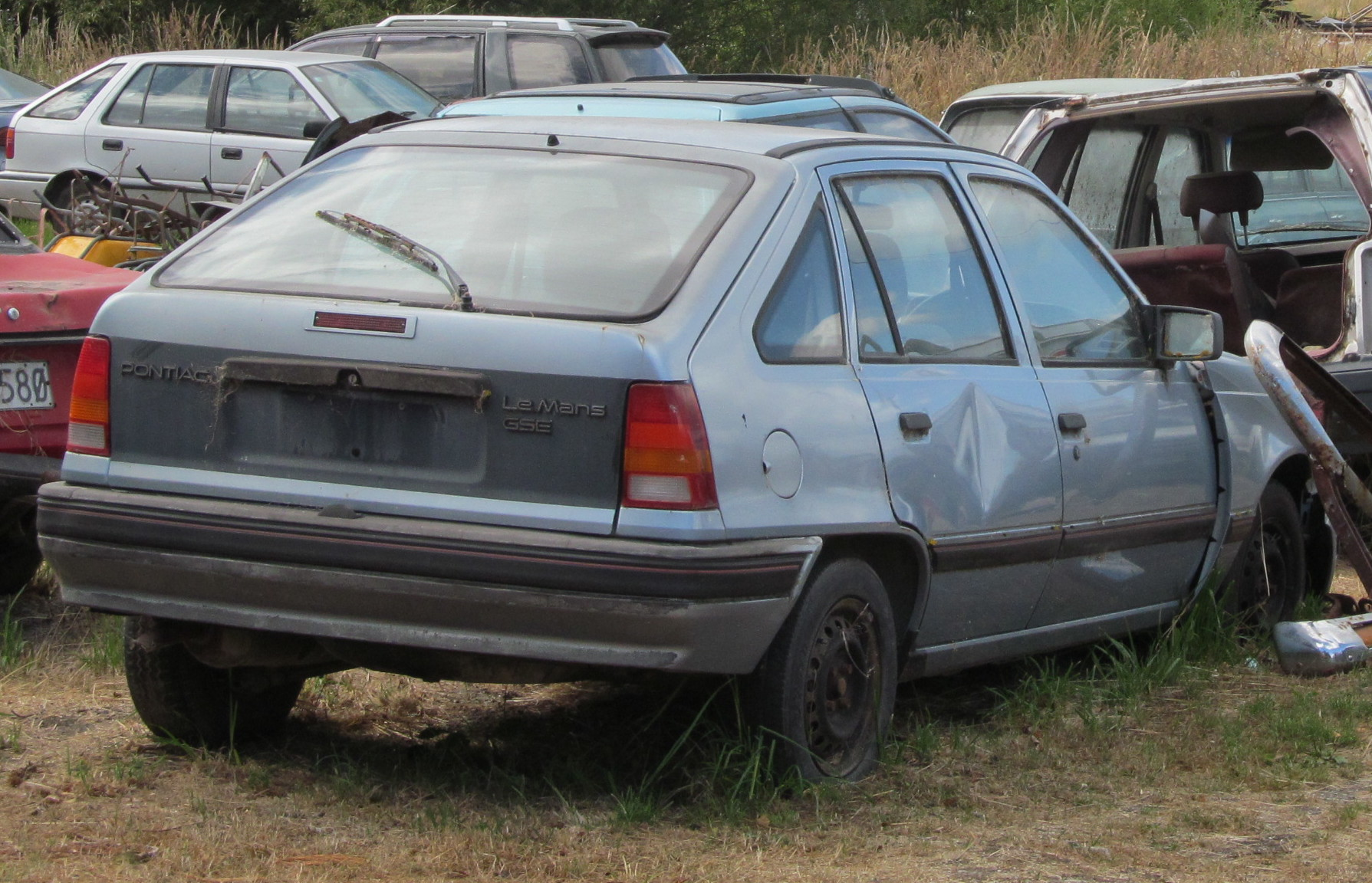
Pontiac LeMans five-door hatchback (New Zealand)

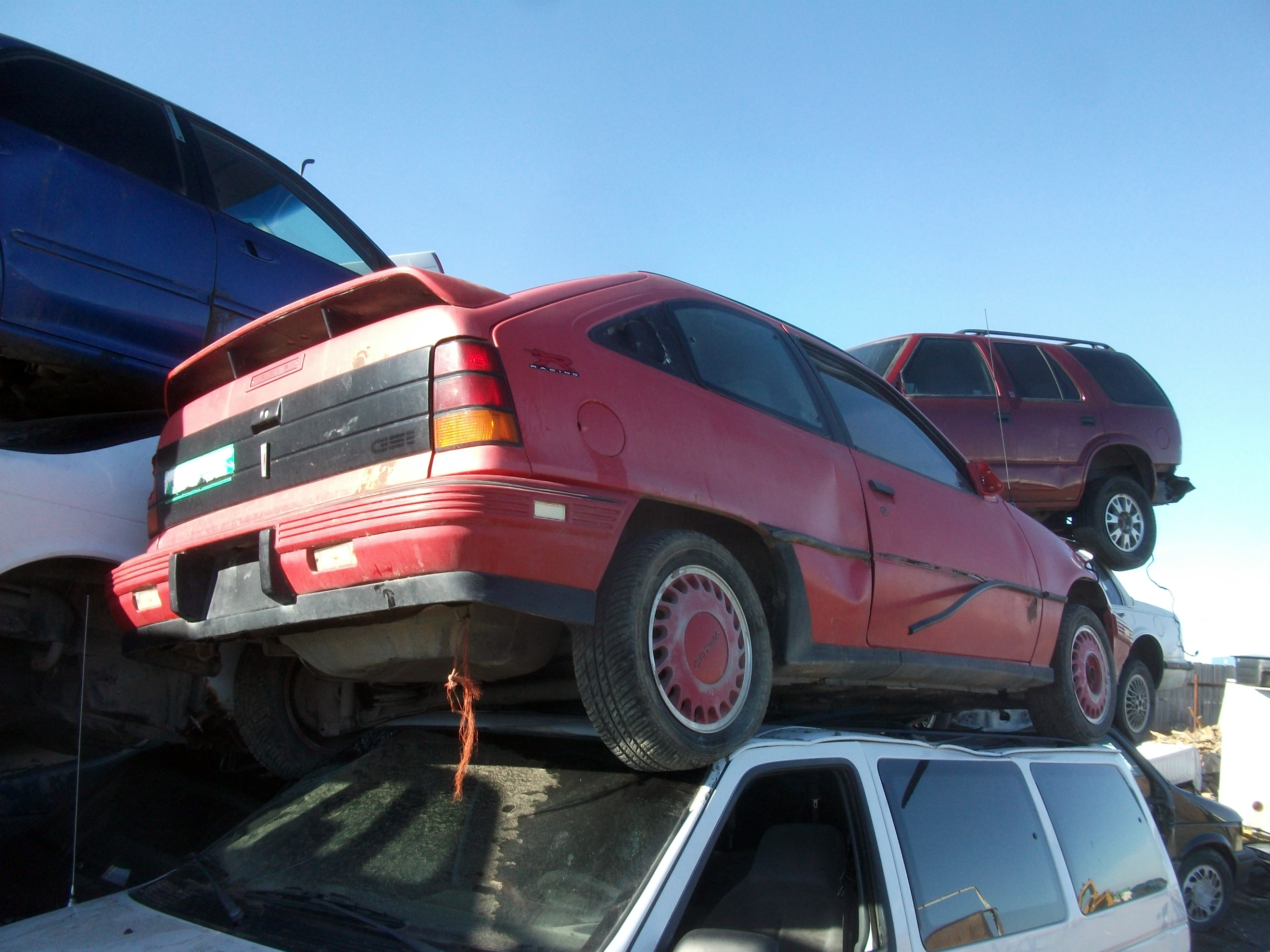
Passport Optima GSi (Canada)

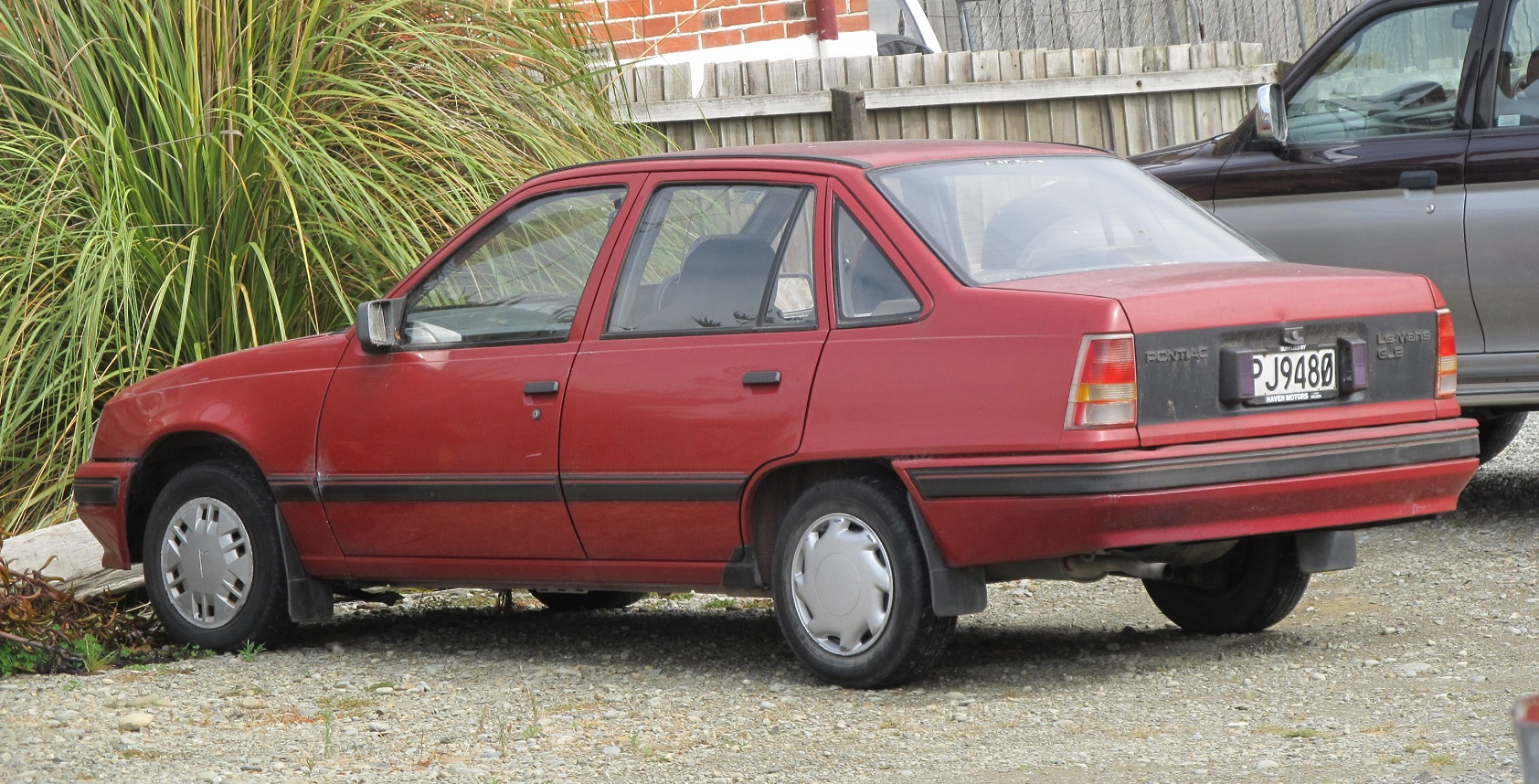
Pontiac LeMans GLE sedan (New Zealand)

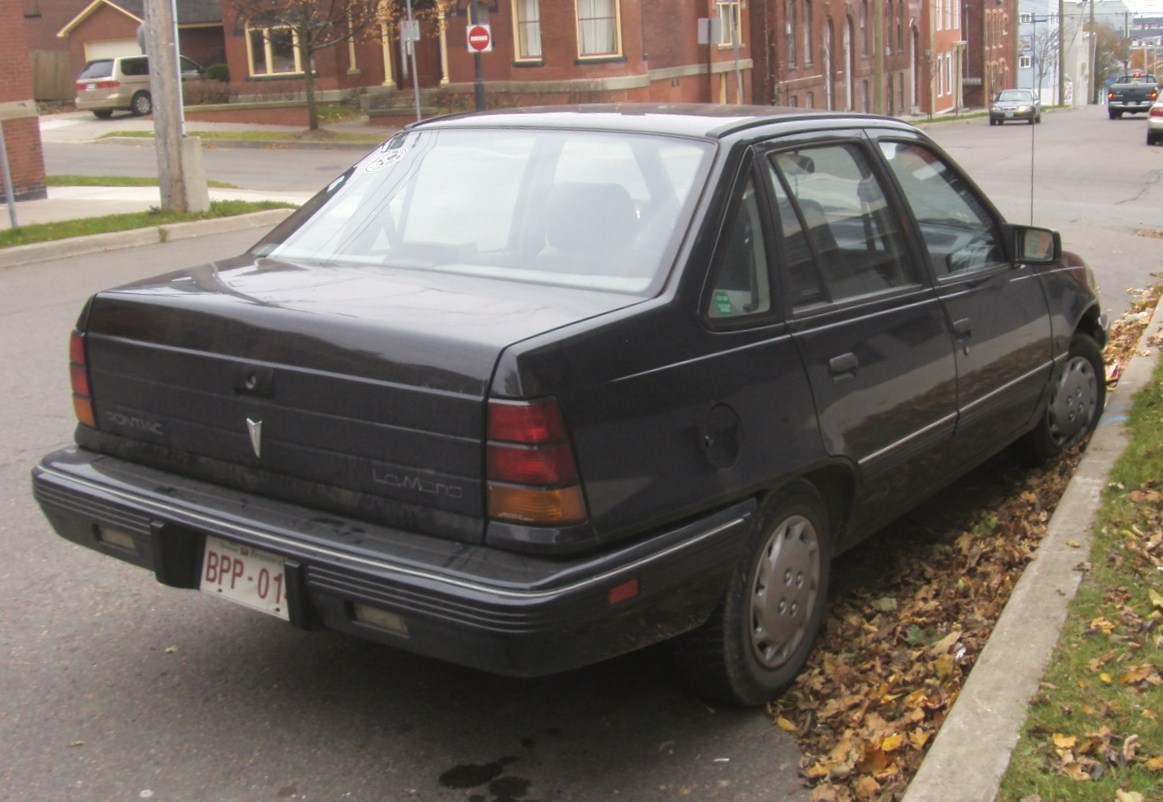
Pontiac LeMans (US; rear view)

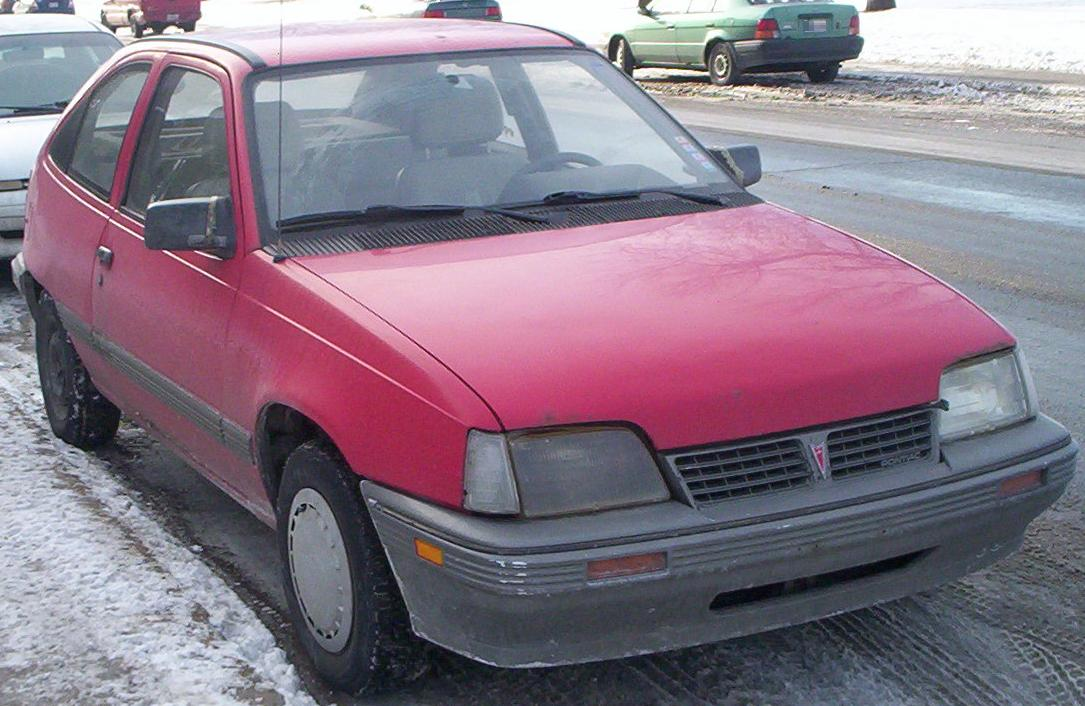
Pontiac LeMans Hatchback (US)

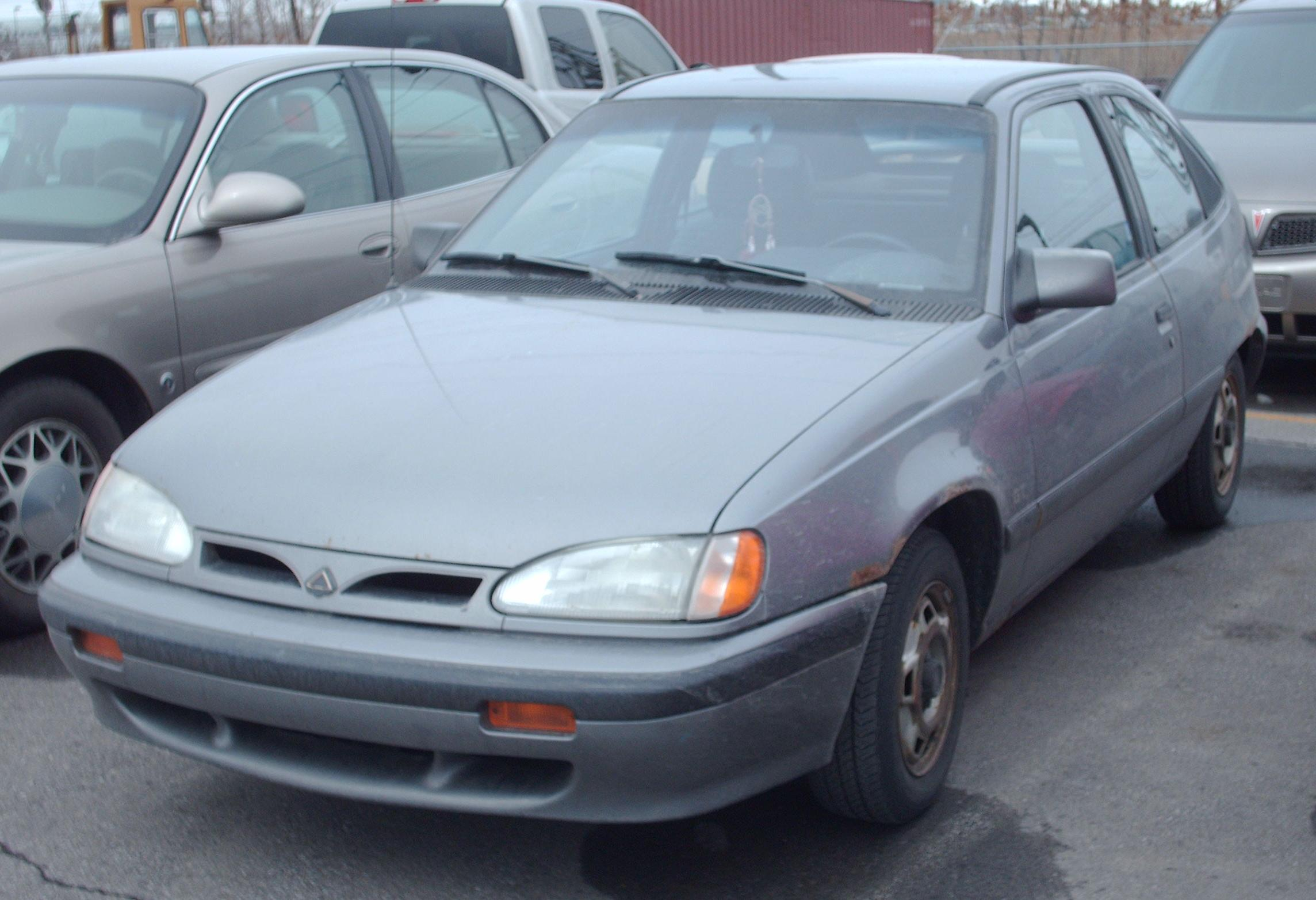
Asüna GT hatchback facelift (Canada)
