= Pontiac Trophy 4 engine =

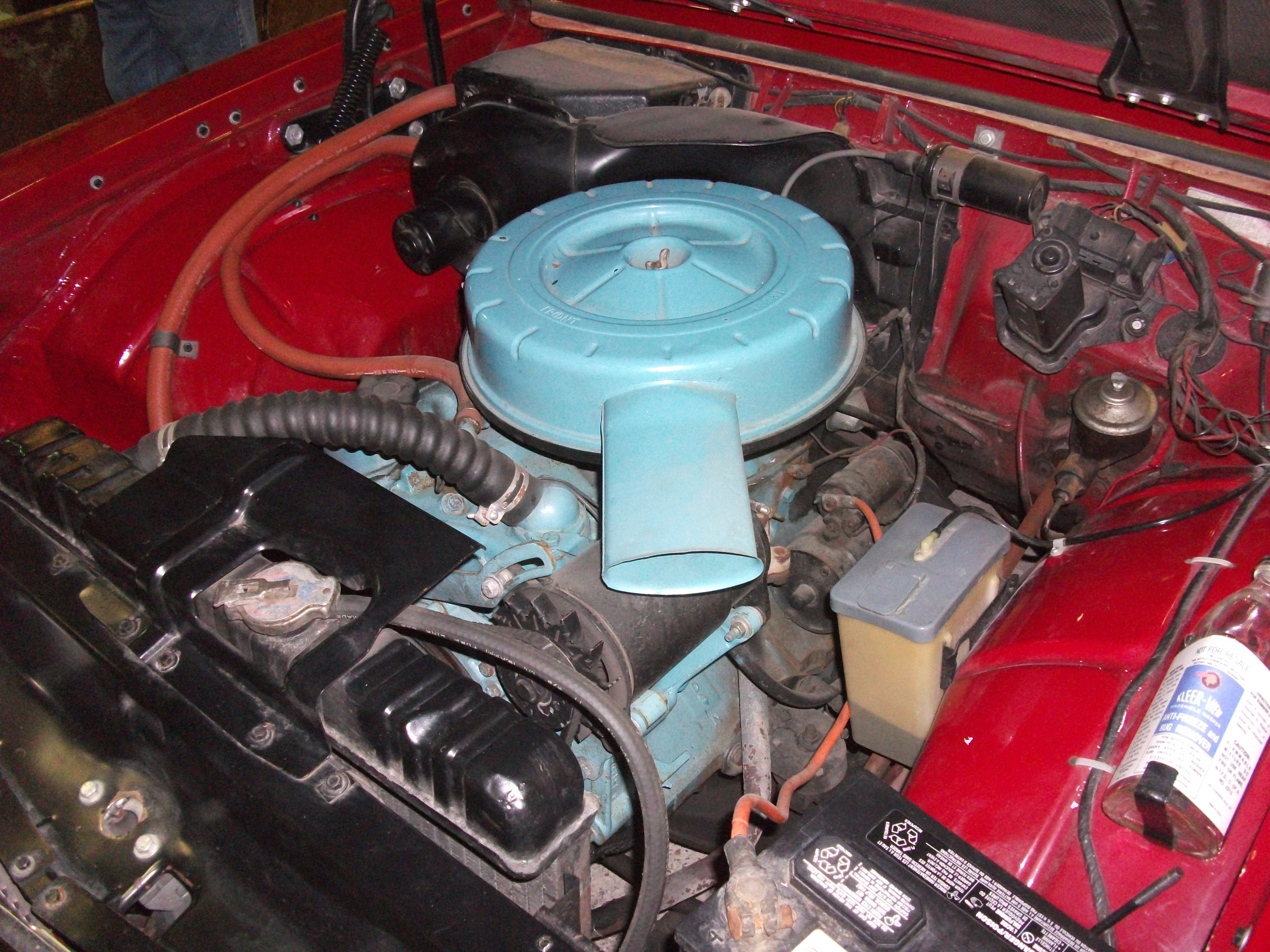
- 1962 Pontiac Tempest LeMans

Overview
- Manufacturer: Pontiac Division of General Motors
- Also called: Indianapolis 4 Indy 4
- Production: 1961-63

Layout
- Configuration: Naturally aspirated inline four
- Displacement: 194.5 cu in (3.2 L)
- Cylinder bore: 4 1/16 in (103.2 mm)
- Piston stroke: 3 3/4 in (95.3 mm)
- Valvetrain: OHV 2 valves per cyl.

Combustion
- Fuel system: Single or 4-barrel carburetor
- Fuel type: Gasoline
- Cooling system: Water-cooled

Output
- Power output: 110–166 hp (82–124 kW)
- Torque output: 190–215 lb⋅ft (258–292 N⋅m)

Dimensions
- Dry weight: 470 lb (210 kg)

The Pontiac Trophy 4 engine (also called the Indianapolis 4, or Indy 4) is a 194.5 cu in (3.2 L) inline four-cylinder engine produced by the Pontiac Motor Division of General Motors for model years 1961 through 1963. Created from one bank of Pontiac's powerful 389 cu in (6.4 L) Trophy V8, its only application was in the first generation Pontiac Tempest. It was dubbed by Pontiac the Trophy 4, playing off the racing success that had earned the 389 V8 engine the nickname Trophy V8 after just two years of competition.

== History ==
The Trophy 4 engine is a short-stroke, 45-degree inclined inline four created from the right bank of the 389 V8 for the debut of the Tempest in 1961. Its 194.43 cu in (3.2 L) displacement is precisely half of the 389, with an identical bore and stroke of 4 1/16 in × 3 3/4 in (103.2 mm × 95.3 mm). It shared most of the 389's tooling and up to 120 of its parts. This degree of commonality enabled it to be produced on the same lines as the V8, allowing substantial cost savings. The Trophy 4 weighs about 470 lb (210 kg), as compared to the 650 lb (290 kg) V8 it was based on.

The brainchild of auto industry legend John DeLorean, then the head of a design team responsible for the birth of the Tempest line, the Trophy 4 produces 110 hp (82 kW) (gross) at 3,800 rpm and 190 lb⋅ft (258 N⋅m) at 2,000 rpm with a single-barrel carburetor (as fitted with manual transmission using regular gas, and 120 hp (89 kW) with premium); 130 hp (97 kW) with regular gas (and 140 hp (104 kW) with premium), as fitted with automatic transmission; and 155 hp (116 kW) at 4,800 rpm and 215 lb⋅ft (292 N⋅m) at 2,800 rpm with the optional four-barrel carburetor and automatic transmission. A "power pack" option for the 1962 four-barrel carburetor increased rated power to 166 hp (124 kW).

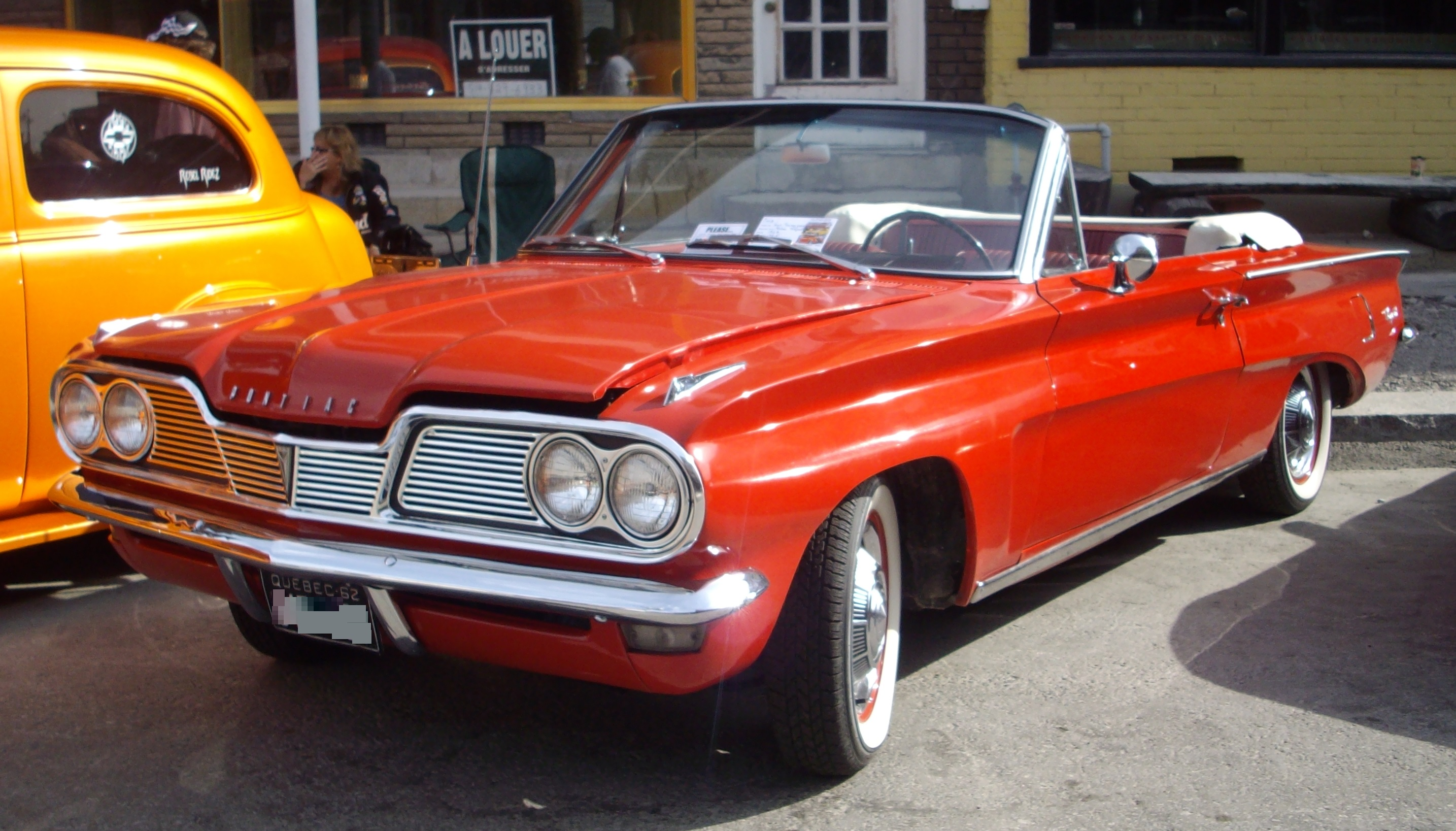
1962 Pontiac Tempest convertible

The Tempest's drivetrain features a rear-mounted transaxle connected to the engine via a torque tube, giving the car a near-perfect 50-50 front-rear weight balance. As the driveshaft runs at engine speed, rather than the transmission output speed, it runs at a higher speed and lower torque than a conventional driveshaft for a rear wheel drive car. This allows it to be an unusually small 5/8 inch (16 mm) solid rotating shaft, inside the pressed steel square torque tube. Uniquely, the shaft is also bent downwards into a curve, which has the effect of making the critical speed of such a flexible shaft higher than the engine's maximum rpm. The curve of this flexible, thin driveshaft earned it the nickname "rope drive".

A downside of the Trophy 4 is engine vibration, as an inline four-cylinder engine suffers from inherent secondary imbalance resulting from its 180 degree crankshaft. The Trophy 4 is cushioned by flexible rubber engine mounts designed to isolate the engine from the rest of the car, and its forces are further damped by the Tempest's unusual drivetrain that distributes these forces through the torque tube to the rear-mounted transaxle. The timing chain in the Trophy 4 was originally the same as the 389, but was prone to stretch and break from engine vibration; a special high-strength version was developed as a replacement.

The Trophy 4 was dropped from the Tempest line when it upgraded from a compact to an intermediate for the 1964 model year.

== See also ==
- Iron Duke engine
- Pontiac straight-6 engine
- Pontiac straight-8 engine
- Pontiac V8 engine
