= Pontiac straight-6 engine =

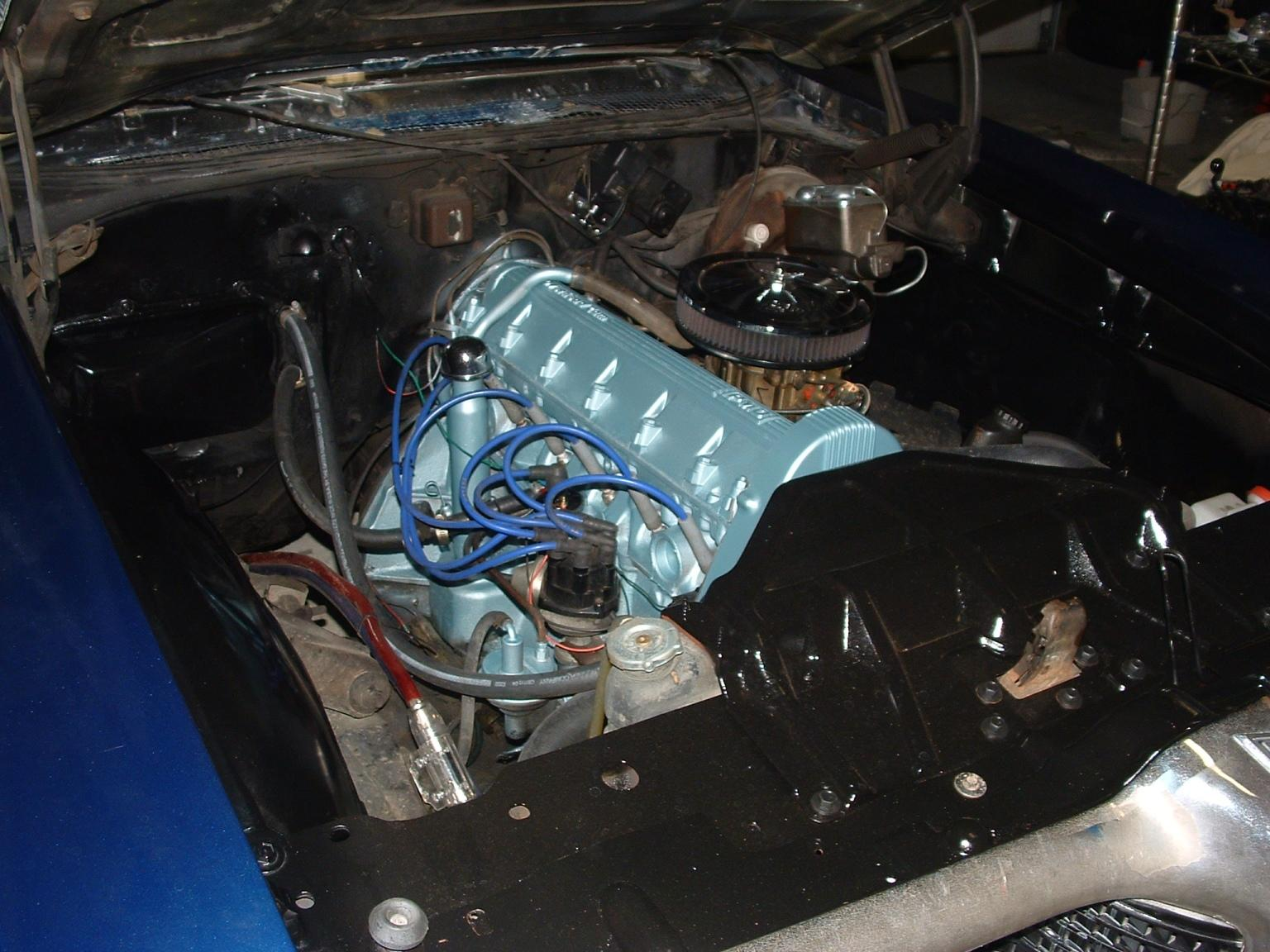

Overview
- Manufacturer: Pontiac (General Motors)
- Production: 1926-1969

Layout
- Configuration: Naturally aspirated Straight-6
- Displacement: 186.7 cu in (3.1 L); 200 cu in (3.3 L); 208 cu in (3.4 L); 215 cu in (3.5 L); 223 cu in (3.7 L); 230 cu in (3.8 L); 239 cu in (3.9 L); 250 cu in (4.1 L)
- Cylinder bore: 3.25 in (82.6 mm) (186 cuin.)
- Piston stroke: 3.75 in (95.3 mm) (186 cuin.)
- Cylinder block material: Cast iron
- Cylinder head material: Cast iron
- Valvetrain: Sidevalve; OHV or SOHC (1964-1969)
- Compression ratio: 4.8:1, 4.9:1, 6.2:1, 6.5:1, 6.8:1, 7.0:1, 7.7:1 10.5:1

Combustion
- Fuel system: Rochester Quadrajet or Carter Carburetors
- Fuel type: Gasoline
- Oil system: Wet sump
- Cooling system: Water-cooled

Output
- Power output: 40–230 hp (29.8–171.5 kW)
- Torque output: 150–193 lb⋅ft (203–262 N⋅m)

The Pontiac straight-6 engine is a family of inline-six cylinder automobile engines produced by the Pontiac Division of General Motors Corporation in numerous versions beginning in 1926.

== "Split Head" Six ==
=== 186 ===
In the 1920s Oakland Motor Car engineers designed an all new engine for their "companion" make, the Pontiac, that was introduced in 1926. It was a side-valve design with a one piece cast iron block with three main bearings. An unusual feature was that it had two separate cylinder heads that each covered three cylinders. The ignition distributor was mounted on top of the block in the gap between the heads. This engine was also used in GMC's 1927 T-10 and 1928 T-11 (their lightest trucks) as well as their next lightest truck, the T-19, beginning in 1928. Development of the engine shared characteristics with the Oldsmobile Straight-6 engine, as GM worked together to develop the engine for Pontiac combined with the resources of GM-Northway Motor and Manufacturing Division.

This engine displaced 186.7 cu in (3.1 L) with a bore and stroke of 3.25 in × 3.75 in (82.6 mm × 95.3 mm) and was rated at 40 hp (30 kW; 41 PS) at 2400 rpm when it was introduced. The compression ratio was 4.8:1.

=== 200 ===
In 1929, the "split head" Pontiac six was increased in displacement to 200 cu in (3.3 L). The horsepower rating increased to 60 hp (45 kW; 61 PS) @ 3000 rpm. Compression was increased slightly to 4.9:1. The "split-head" six was discontinued by Pontiac at the end of the 1932 model year. Pontiac offered only eight-cylinder engines during 1933 and 1934. GMC also switched to the 200 cubic inch engine in 1929, using it into early in the 1933 model year.

== Flathead Six ==
=== 208 ===
In 1935, Pontiac re-introduced their six-cylinder engine, as a 208 cu in (3.4 L) straight-6. The 208 was produced in 1935 and 1936. It was a side-valve design with a timing chain, as was popular at the time. This engine featured a conventional one piece cylinder head, and the distributor was moved to the side of the block. The number of main bearings was increased to four. Like the Pontiac Straight-8 engine it also featured full-pressure oiling and insert type precision main and rod bearings. These two latter features greatly increased longevity and durability especially under high speed conditions.

=== 223 Pontiac/GMC ===
The 223 was a side-valve engine, and used a timing chain. The 223 cu in (3.7 L) straight-6 was used in Pontiac automobiles (1937–40) and GMC trucks (1938 only).

=== 239 ===
The 239 cu in (3.9 L) straight-6 was similar in design to previous sixes. It was used from 1941 through 1954 only in Pontiac automobiles.

=== Specifications ===
Year	Model name (number)	Displacement	Output	Torque	Compression	Carburetor series (bbl)
1935	Master & DeLuxe 6 (6-35)	208 cu in (3.4 L)	80 hp (59.7 kW) @ 3600 rpm	150 lb⋅ft (203 N⋅m) @ 1600 rpm	6.2:1	Carter W-1 (1)
1936	Master & DeLuxe 6 (6-36)	208 cu in (3.4 L)	80 hp (59.7 kW) @ 3600 rpm	150 lb⋅ft (203 N⋅m) @ 1600 rpm	6.2:1	Carter W-1 (1)
1937	Six (6-37)	222.7 cu in (3.6 L)	85 hp (63.4 kW) @ 3520 rpm	161 lb⋅ft (218 N⋅m) @ 1600 rpm	6.2:1	Carter W-1 (1)
1938	Six (6-38)	222.7 cu in (3.6 L)	85 hp (63.4 kW) @ 3520 rpm	161 lb⋅ft (218 N⋅m) @ 1600 rpm	6.2:1	Carter W-1 (1)
1939	Quality & DeLuxe 6 (39-25) & (39-26)	222.7 cu in (3.6 L)	85 hp (63.4 kW) @ 3520 rpm	161 lb⋅ft (218 N⋅m) @ 1600 rpm	6.2:1	Carter WA-1 (1)
1940	Special & DeLuxe 6 (40-25) & (40-26)	222.7 cu in (3.6 L)	87 hp (64.9 kW) @ 3520 rpm	164 lb⋅ft (222 N⋅m) @ 1400 rpm	6.5:1	Carter WA-1 (1)
1941	Custom, DeLuxe & Streamliner Torpedo 6 (41-24), (41-25), & (41-26)	239.2 cu in (3.9 L)	90 hp (67.1 kW) @ 3200 rpm	175 lb⋅ft (237 N⋅m) @ 1400 rpm	6.5:1	Carter WA-1 (1)
1942	Torpedo & Streamliner Torpedo 6 (42-25) & (42-26)	239.2 cu in (3.9 L)	90 hp (67.1 kW) @ 3200 rpm	175 lb⋅ft (237 N⋅m) @ 1400 rpm	6.5:1	Carter WA-1 (1)
1946	Torpedo & Streamliner 6 (46-25) & (46-26)	239.2 cu in (3.9 L)	93 hp (69.4 kW) @ 3400 rpm	175 lb⋅ft (237 N⋅m) @ 1400 rpm	6.5:1	Carter WA-1 (1)
1947	Torpedo & Streamliner 6 (47-25) & (47-26)	239.2 cu in (3.9 L)	93 hp (69.4 kW) @ 3400 rpm	175 lb⋅ft (237 N⋅m) @ 1400 rpm	6.5:1	Carter WA-1 (1)
1948	Torpedo & Streamliner 6 (48-25) & (48-26)	239.2 cu in (3.9 L)	93 hp (69.4 kW) @ 3400 rpm	178 lb⋅ft (241 N⋅m) @ 1400 rpm	6.5:1	Carter WA-1 (1)
1949	Silver Streak 6 (49-25)	239.2 cu in (3.9 L)	93 hp (69.4 kW) @ 3400 rpm	178 lb⋅ft (241 N⋅m) @ 1400 rpm	6.5:1	Carter WA-1 (1)
1950	Silver Streak 6 (50-25)	239.2 cu in (3.9 L)	90 hp (67.1 kW) @ 3400 rpm	178 lb⋅ft (241 N⋅m) @ 1200 rpm	6.5:1	Carter WA-1 (1)
1951	Silver Streak 6 (51-25)	239.2 cu in (3.9 L)	96 hp (71.6 kW) @ 3400 rpm	191 lb⋅ft (259 N⋅m) @ 1200 rpm	6.5:1	Carter WA-1 (1)
1952	Silver Streak 6 (52-25) with manual trans.	239.2 cu in (3.9 L)	100 hp (74.6 kW) @ 3400 rpm	189 lb⋅ft (256 N⋅m) @ 1400 rpm	6.8:1	Carter WA-1 (1)
1952	Silver Streak 6 (52-25) with automatic trans.	239.2 cu in (3.9 L)	102 hp (76.1 kW) @ 3400 rpm	189 lb⋅ft (256 N⋅m) @ 1400 rpm	7.7:1	Carter WA-1 (1)
1953	Chieftain 6 (53-25) with manual trans.	239.2 cu in (3.9 L)	115 hp (85.8 kW) @ 3800 rpm	193 lb⋅ft (262 N⋅m) @ 2000 rpm	7.0:1	Carter WCD (2)
1953	Chieftain 6 (53-25) with automatic trans.	239.2 cu in (3.9 L)	118 hp (88.0 kW) @ 3800 rpm	193 lb⋅ft (262 N⋅m) @ 2000 rpm	7.7:1	Carter WCD (2)
1954	Chieftain 6 (54-25) with manual trans.	239.2 cu in (3.9 L)	115 hp (85.8 kW) @ 3800 rpm	193 lb⋅ft (262 N⋅m) @ 2000 rpm	7.0:1	Carter WCD (2)
1954	Chieftain 6 (54-25) with automatic trans.	239.2 cu in (3.9 L)	118 hp (88.0 kW) @ 3800 rpm	193 lb⋅ft (262 N⋅m) @ 2000 rpm	7.7:1	Carter WCD (2)

== Overhead Valve ==
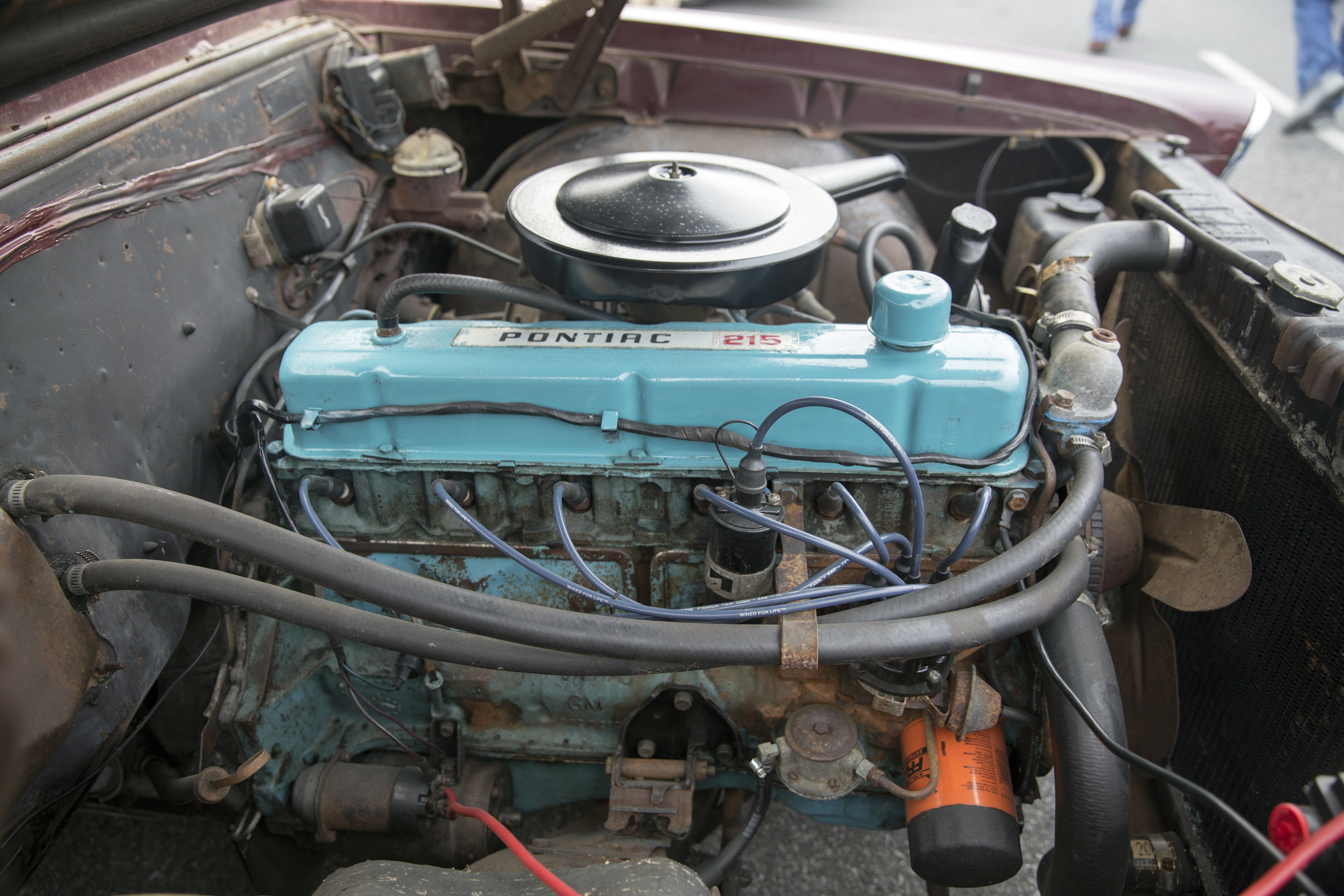
The 215 cid overhead valve engine in a 1965 LeMans

=== 215 ===
A 215 cu in (3.5 L) overhead valve straight-6 was produced in 1964 and 1965 but was not an original Pontiac design. Sometimes confused with the Buick designed and built 215 cu in (3.5 L) aluminum V8 that Pontiac had used in the two years prior, the "Pontiac 215" was an adaptation of Chevrolet's 194 cu.in. inline 6 currently produced and the new 230 cu in (3.8 L) overhead valve Turbo-Thrift straight-6. Quite different from Pontiac's previous straight-6s, it had a smaller bore 3.75 in (95.3 mm) than the 15 cu in (250 cc) larger Chevrolet engine and a Chevy bellhousing, but its flywheel/flexplate bolt pattern was Pontiac's.

== Overhead cam ==
=== 230 ===
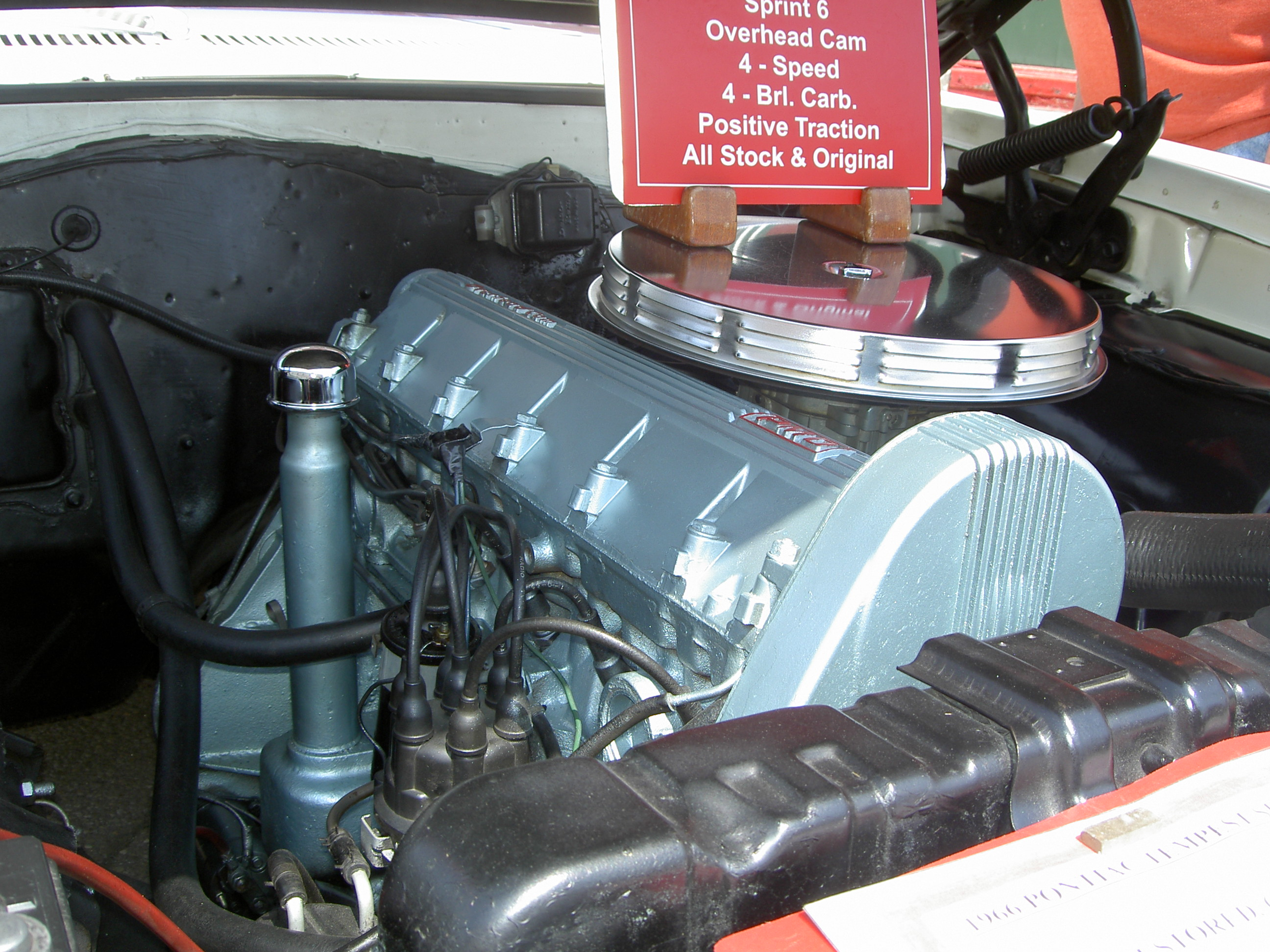
OHC 230 cu in (3.8 L) inline-6

A single overhead camshaft (SOHC) design was introduced by Pontiac in the 1966 model year as the standard engine in the Tempest. Offered also in 1967, the 230 cu in (3.8 L) OHC 6 shared internal dimensions with the overhead valve Chevrolet straight-6 engine it was based on, but had unique cast iron block and head castings. Only the large cam carrier/valve cover was aluminum. It used a jackshaft (outside of the block) for oil pump and distributor drive. The jackshaft was driven by the fiberglass reinforced timing belt. It was offered with a single one barrel carburetor, rated at 165 hp (123 kW). A W53 Sprint version for the Firebird produced up to 215 hp (160 kW).

Considered advanced by Detroit engineering standards at the time, the Pontiac OHC 6 followed the Jeep Tornado I6 as the second post-World War II domestic-developed and mass-produced overhead cam automobile engine.

The Pontiac's single camshaft was supported by journals within the aluminum valve cover; no separate bearing shells were used. The cam was driven by a noise-reducing fiberglass-reinforced cogged rubber belt instead of the usual metal chain or gears. Valves were opened with finger followers (centered under the cam) that pivoted at one end on stationary hydraulic adjusters. The oil pump, distributor, and fuel pump were driven by an external jackshaft powered by a rubber timing belt nestled within an aluminum housing bolted to the right side of the block. The head had a single port face with both exhaust and intake valves on the left side and valve stems strongly tilted towards the left. This engine was used in the 1966-67 Tempest and Le Mans and 1967 Firebird.

An optional high-performance Sprint version featured high-compression pistons, hotter cam, dual valve springs, split/dual exhaust manifold, stronger coil, and the then new Rochester Quadrajet carburetor. rated at 207 hp (154 kW). Power was increased to 215 hp (160 kW; 218 PS) in 1967.

Like other Pontiac engines of the era, the OHC 6 was not available in Canada with the exception of the Sprint version of the Firebird. Canadian-market Pontiac automobiles were equipped with the Chevrolet OHV six.

=== 250 ===
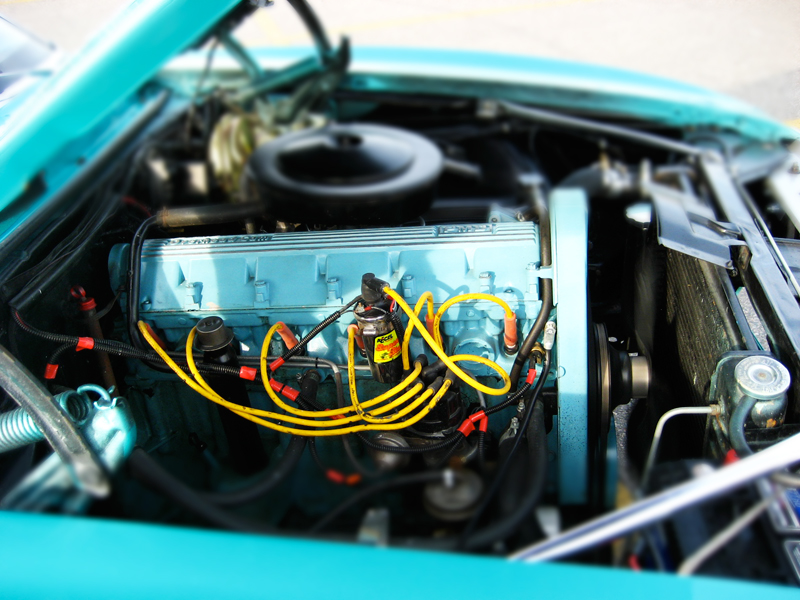
OHC 250 cu in (4.1 L) 1-bbl inline-6 (1968)

The OHC 230 cu in (3.8 L) was enlarged to 250 cu in (4.1 L) for 1968 to 1969. The base engine produced 175 hp (130 kW; 177 PS) while the 4 bbl Quadrajet Sprint versions were rated up to 215 hp (160 kW; 218 PS) with automatic transmissions. The versions with a manual transmission received a hotter camshaft that boosted ratings to 230 hp (172 kW; 233 PS).

== See also ==
- Pontiac Trophy 4 engine
- Pontiac straight-8 engine
- Pontiac V8 engine
- List of GM engines
