= Pontiac Tempest =

Automobile manufactured by Pontiac (1960-1991)

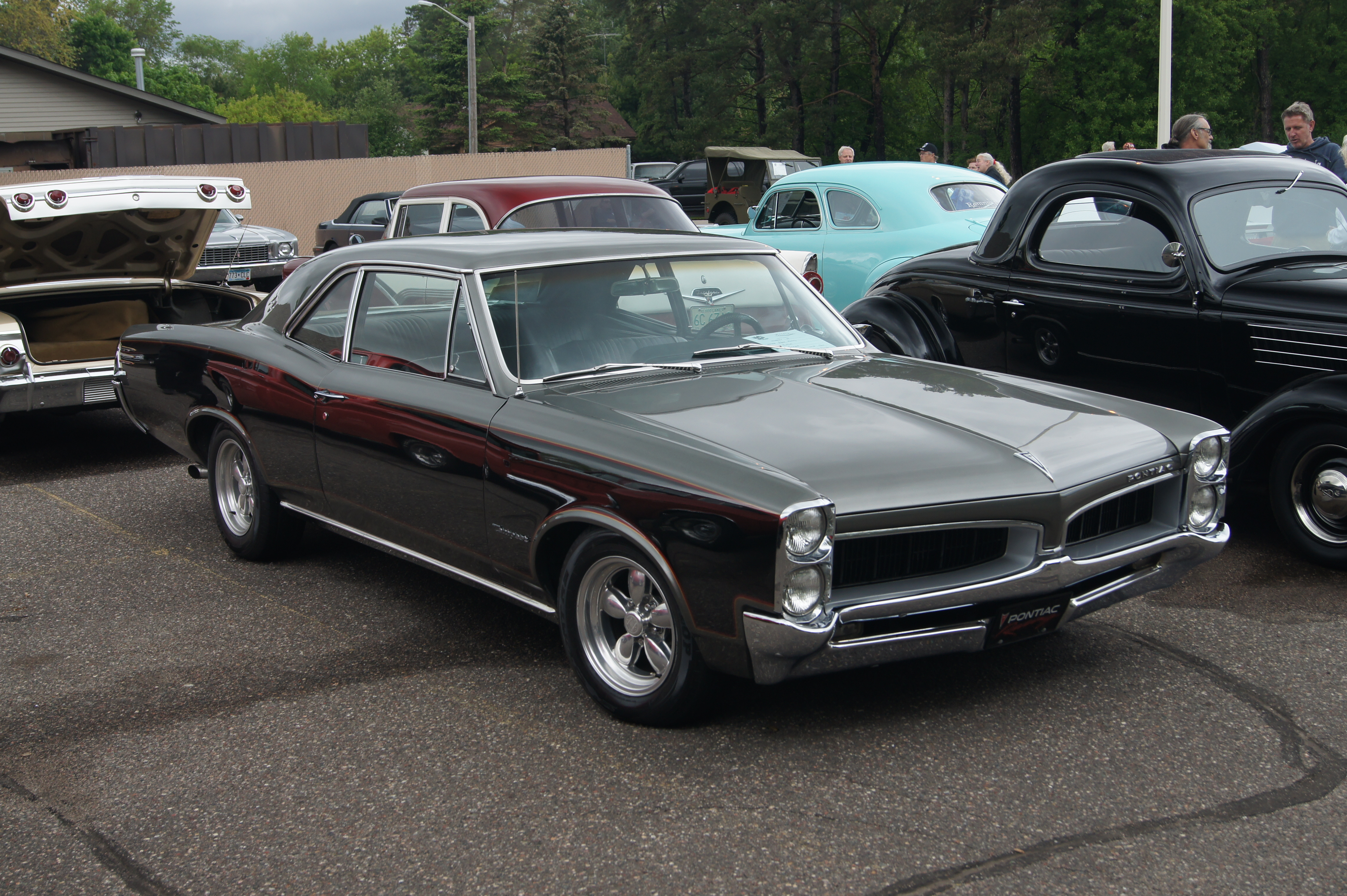
- 1967 Pontiac Tempest

Overview
- Manufacturer: Pontiac (General Motors)
- Production: 1960–1970; 1987–1991
- Assembly: Pontiac Assembly, Pontiac, Michigan

Chronology
- Successor: LeMans and Grand Am

The Pontiac Tempest is an automobile that was produced by Pontiac from 1960 to 1970, and again from 1987 to 1991.

The Tempest was introduced as an entry-level compact in October 1960 at the Paris Auto Show for the 1961 model year. Built on GM's first unibody chassis, its new Y-platform was shared with the Buick Special/Skylark and Oldsmobile F-85/Cutlass.

While the Buick and Olds versions used a conventional drivetrain, the Pontiac had a unique, innovative design. The Tempest featured a front-engine/rear-transaxle layout that very nearly resulted in an ideal 50/50 weight distribution, together with independent rear suspension for nimble handling (a swing axle design similar to the Chevy Corvair). A Slant-4 engine connected to the 2-speed automatic transaxle via a flexible "rope" drive shaft. This configuration eliminated the driveshaft hump, yielding a flat floor with increased interior space. The Pontiac "Trophy-4" was also unique, created by basically halving a standard Pontiac V8 block.

Buick's aluminum 215 V8 was also optional in 1961 and 1962, but very few Tempests were so equipped. The Tempest line offered an optional LeMans trim upgrade.

In 1964 the Tempest was redesigned as a mid-size car on the updated GM A-body platform, which used a conventional drivetrain. The base Tempest, Tempest Custom, and Lemans became separate trim packages, with an optional GTO performance option available on the LeMans for 1964 and 1965. The GTO was offered as a separate model line beginning in 1966. The Tempest name was retired after 1970, replaced by the T-37 as the base model, which in turn gave way to the LeMans name in 1972.

In Canada from 1987 to 1991, Pontiac marketed a rebadged version of the compact L-body Chevrolet Corsica under the revived Tempest name.

== First generation (1961–1963) ==
First generation
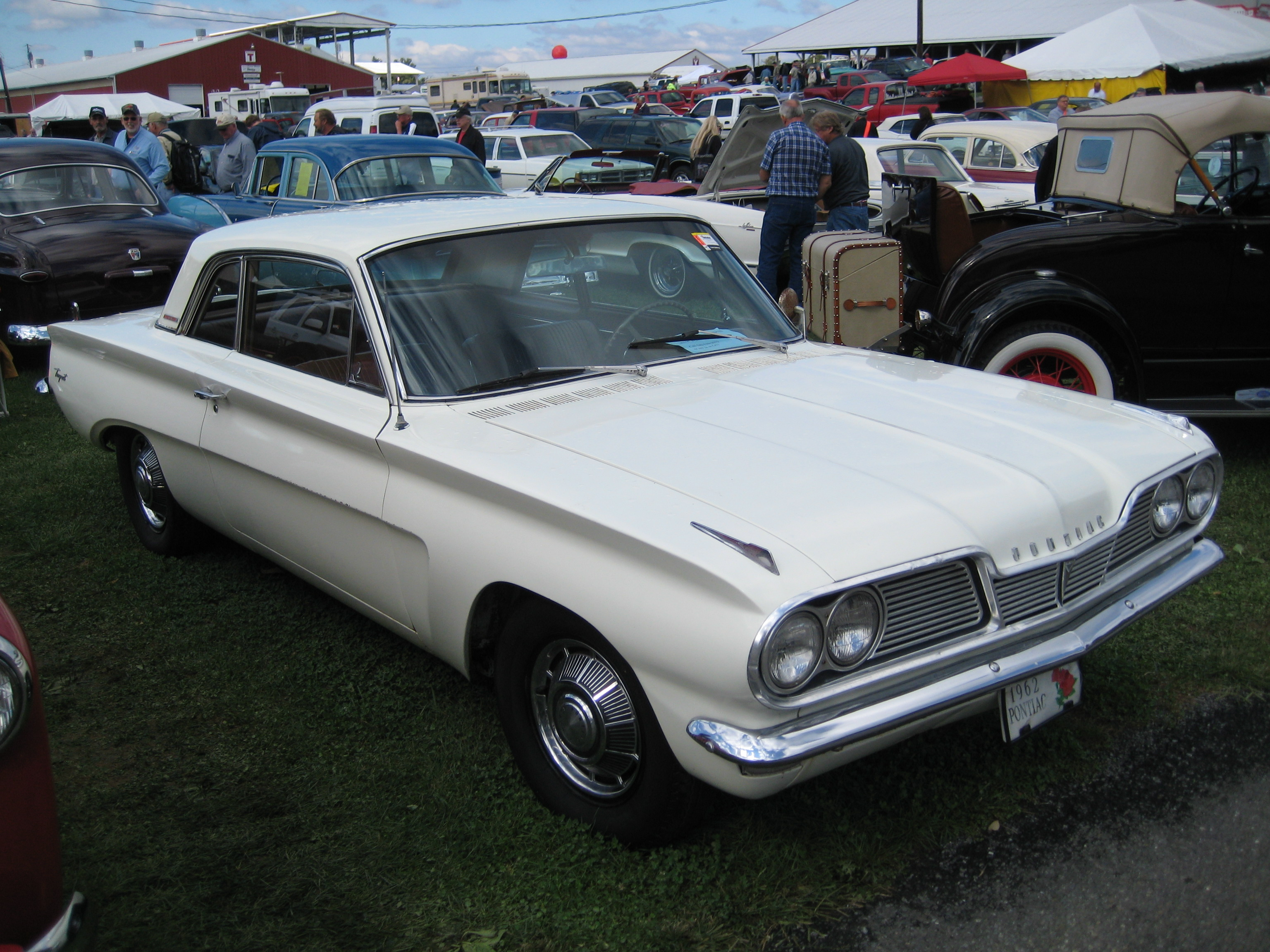
- 1962 Pontiac Tempest 2-door coupe

Overview
- Model years: 1961–1963
- Assembly: (main plant); Pontiac, Michigan (Pontiac Assembly) (branch assembly); Kansas City, Kansas, United States, (Fairfax Assembly); South Gate, California, United States, (South Gate Assembly)

Body and chassis
- Class: Compact
- Body style: 4-door station wagon 4-door sedan 2-door coupe 2-door convertible
- Layout: FR layout
- Platform: Y-body
- Related: Oldsmobile F-85; Buick Special

Powertrain
- Engine: 195 cu in (3.2 L) I4; 215 cu in (3.5 L) Buick V8; 326 cu in (5.3 L) V8
- Transmission: 2-speed automatic 3-speed manual 4-speed manual

Dimensions
- Wheelbase: 112 in (2,845 mm)
- Length: 189.3 in (4,808 mm)
- Width: 72.2 in (1,834 mm)
- Height: 53.5 in (1,359 mm) (sedan); 54.3 in (1,379 mm) (station wagon)
- Curb weight: 2,810–3,070 lb (1,275–1,393 kg)

The Tempest was the result of a decision by the Pontiac division to enter the compact car market following the success of the Chevrolet Corvair. The division wanted to produce a clone of the Corvair, but instead GM gave Pontiac the lead to develop a new car in an interdivisional program coded named "X-100." John Z. DeLorean, Pontiac's chief engineer and general manager, went to work on a car that would meld components GM already produced. His objective was for the new model to be more than just an ordinary compact car. The Tempest was Motor Trend magazine's 1961 Car of the Year. Road & Track praised the Tempest as "exceptionally roomy" and "one of the very best utility cars since the Ford Model A." In hindsight, DeLorean admitted that the Tempest was "less than successful," adding, "there was no mechanical problem, but the car rattled so loudly that it sounded like it was carrying half-a-trunkful of rolling rocks."

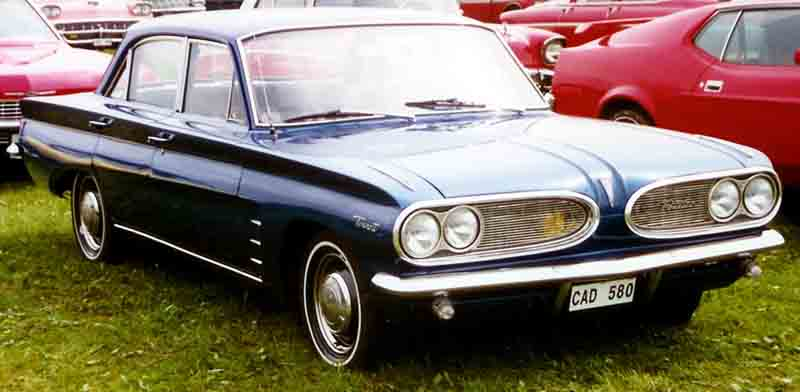
1961 Pontiac Tempest sedan

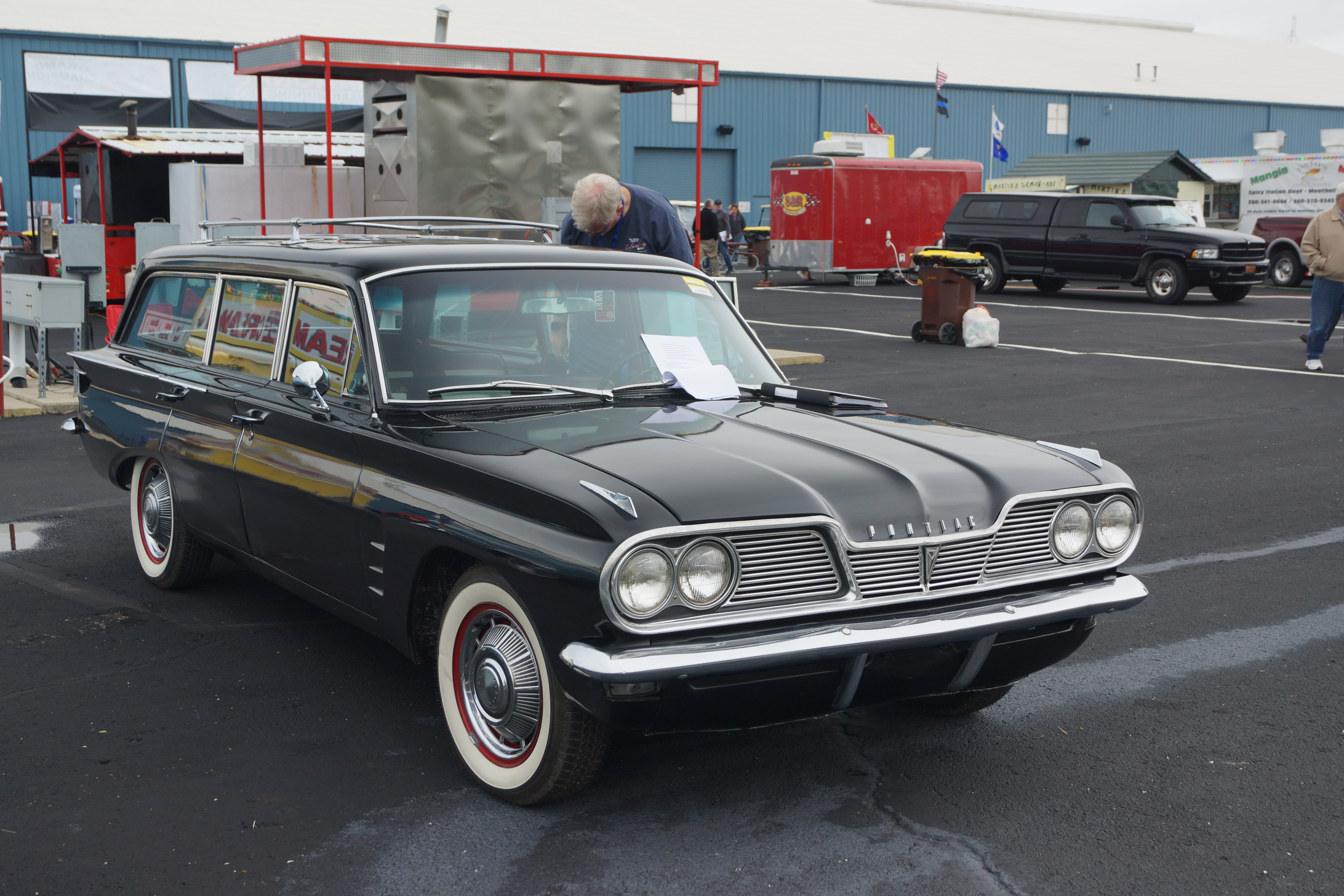
1962 Pontiac Tempest Custom wagon

It shared sheet metal with the Oldsmobile F-85, the first-generation Tempest had several features that differentiated it from the other compact GM cars. The engine was a 195 cubic inch (3.2 L) straight-4 marketed as the "Trophy 4," derived from the right cylinder bank of Pontiac's 389 cubic inch "Trophy 8" V8 engine. The Tempest featured a drivetrain with a rear-mounted transaxle that was coupled to a torque shaft arcing in a 3 in (76 mm) downward bow within a curved, longitudinal tunnel. Use of the torque shaft was the result of being forced to use the Corvair floorpan which, being a rear engine platform, had no drive shaft. To combine flexibility with strength in the proper proportion, the shaft was forged of SAE 8660 steel (high nickel, chrome and molybdenum alloying percentages) for torsion bar specifications. For automatic cars, the shaft was 0.65 in (17 mm) in diameter and 87.25 in (2.216 m) long, while the manual-box shaft was 0.75 in (19 mm) by 82 in (2.1 m). This joined the forward engine and the rear transaxle (therefore no transmission hump) into a single unit, helping to reduce vibration. The design, known as "rope drive," had been seen previously only on General Motors' 1951 Le Sabre concept car.

The combination of a rear-mounted transaxle and front-mounted engine very nearly gave the car an ideal 50/50 front/rear weight distribution. This, along with a four-wheel independent suspension, helped make the Tempest a nimble-handling car for the era. The front engine/rear transaxle design also eliminated the driveshaft/transmission tunnel in the front of the passenger compartment, while lowering the driveshaft tunnel in the rear compared with a conventional front engine/front transmission layout.

The Trophy 4 four-cylinder engine was promoted for its economy, but Pontiac also saved money on its assembly: Because it was based on the right cylinder bank of the Pontiac 389 V8 engine, both engines could be built on the same assembly line. There were three versions of the Trophy 4: An economy version with a relatively low 8.6:1 compression ratio and a single-barrel carburetor; a hotter version with a 10.25:1 compression ratio and a single-barrel carburetor; and the most powerful Trophy 4 engine, which had a 10.25:1 compression ratio and a four-barrel carburetor. While both Trophy 4 engines (low and high compression) equipped with single-barrel carburetors produced 110–140 hp (82–104 kW; 112–142 PS), the high-compression, four-barrel Trophy 4 engine produced 166 hp (124 kW; 168 PS) at 4,800 RPM and 215 lb⋅ft (292 N⋅m) of torque at 2,800 RPM (all ratings are SAE Gross). The three Trophy 4 engine versions offered fuel economy ratings ranging from 18 to 22 MPG. Popular Mechanics reported fuel economy of 21.3 MPG at 60 MPH.

The Trophy 4 engine was generally reliable, but could be harsh when it was out of tune, due to its inherent lack of secondary balance and absence of balancer shafts.

The Tempest was offered with quite a few options such as air conditioning, transistor radios, windshield washers, a parking brake warning light, padded safety dash, child-proof door locks, and dealer-installed seat belts, as such restraints were not yet Federally required at the Tempest's introduction.

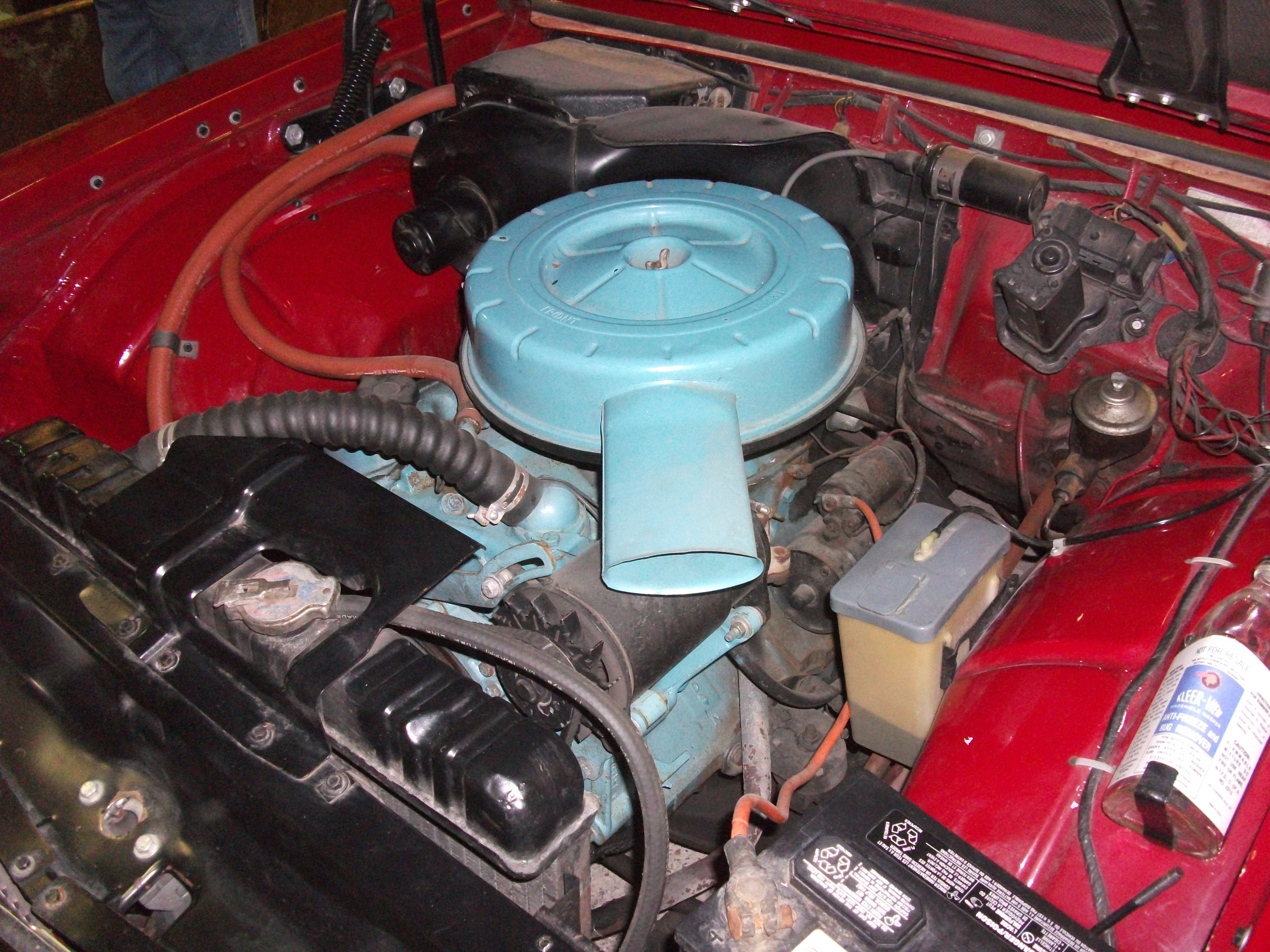
194.5 cu in (3.2 L) Trophy 4 engine in a 1962 Pontiac Tempest LeMans

Another departure from the other Y-body cars was the Tempest's 9 in (23 cm) brake drum, which used five studs on the same bolt circle ("five-on-four-and-a-half") and 15 in (38 cm) wheels - a configuration unique among General Motors cars. Both Buick and Oldsmobile had standardized their Y-body cars on an odd 9.5 in (24 cm) brake drum with four lug studs on a 4.5 in (11 cm)-diameter circle (a "four-on-four-and-a-half" bolt pattern), with 14 in (36 cm) wheels. This arrangement was also not used by other General Motors cars at the time.

Along with the Trophy 4 engine line another optional engine for the Tempest in 1961 and 1962 was the innovative aluminum Buick-built 215 cubic inch (3.5 L) V8. It is estimated that just 3,662 Tempests were ordered with the 215 engine, or about 1% of production. This engine produced, in its various incarnations, from 155–215 hp (116–160 kW; 157–218 PS) despite weighing just 330 lb (150 kg) installed.

The engine blocks used for 215-V8 engines installed in Tempest models were distinct from 215-V8 engine blocks used in other models because, in addition to Buick factory markings, they were also hand-stamped at the Pontiac plant with the Vehicle Identification Numbers of the individual vehicles that they were installed in. Thus, in 1961, all Pontiac 215 engine blocks begin with "161P"; for 1962 the stamping began with "162P". Further code numbers indicated the car's transmission (manual or automatic).

In 1961, the transmission choices were a three-speed column-shifted manual with a non-synchronized first gear, or a two-speed automatic transaxle controlled by a small lever to the right of the ignition switch on the instrument panel. Called TempesTorque in company literature but unmarked on the unit itself until 1963, it was similar in concept to the Chevrolet Powerglide automatic transmission used on the Chevrolet Corvair, although few parts overlapped. For 1962, a floor-mounted, fully synchronized four-speed manual transmission became available.

At its introduction, the Tempest was available only as a four-door pillared sedan and as a station wagon that, like other Pontiac station wagons of the time, had the name Safari added to it. A pair of two-door coupes (one of which was named LeMans) were added at the end of 1961, both in the 1961 body style.

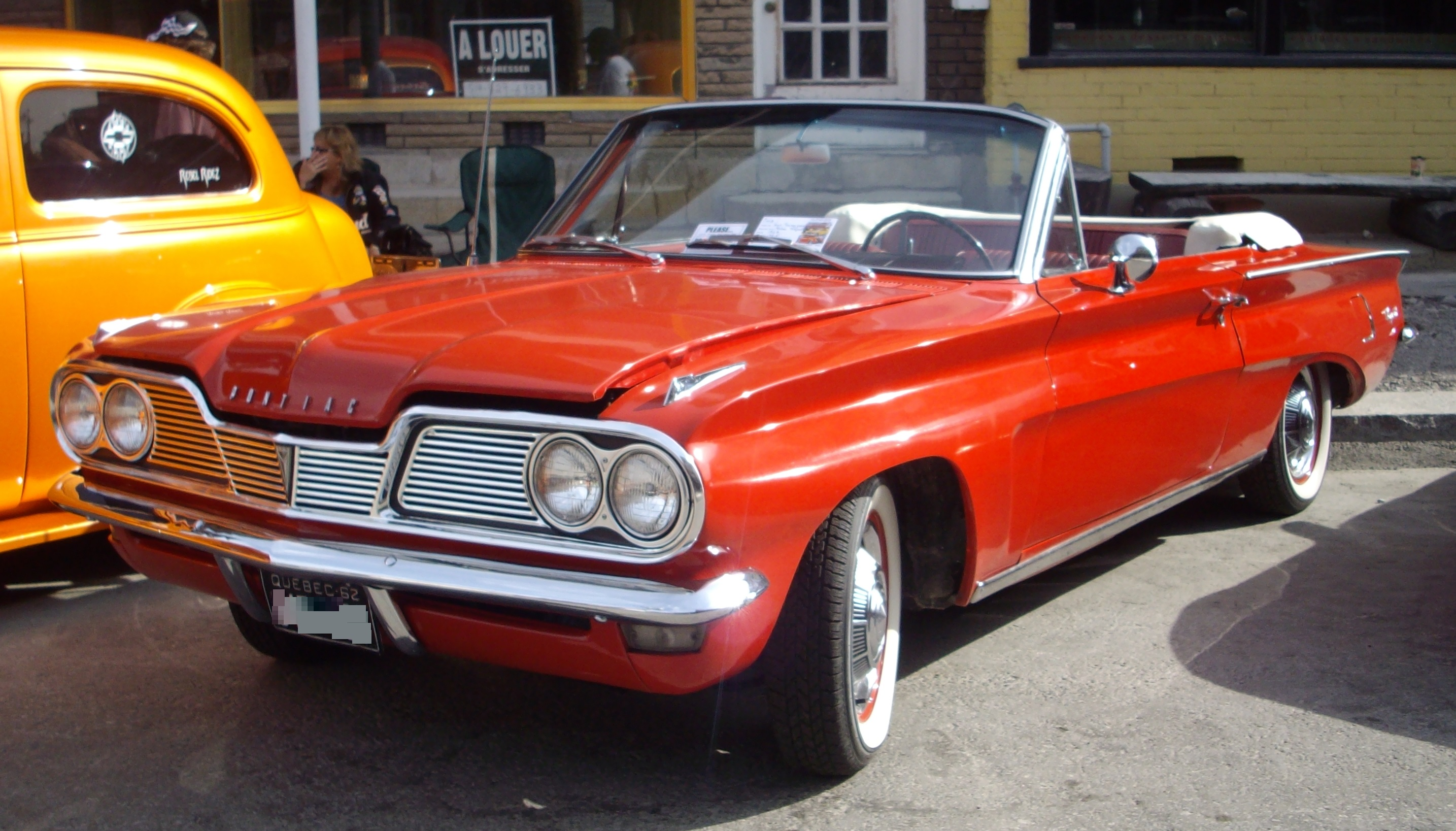
1962 Pontiac Tempest convertible

For the 1962 model year there were four Tempest models available: a sedan, a coupe, a station wagon, and a convertible. Customers wanting something fancier could opt for the LeMans trim package upgrade, which featured front bucket seats. Tempest LeMans models were available with either the coupe or the convertible; there was no LeMans sedan or station wagon. And although Oldsmobile and Buick offered pillarless hardtops on the Cutlass and Skylark respectively, Pontiac did not offer a pillarless hardtop LeMans model.

In 1963, the LeMans became a separate series; its sales were nearly 50 percent of combined Tempest and Le Mans production. 1963 models, referred to as senior compacts, were slightly larger and heavier than the 1961 and 1962 models had been. These new models featured a redesigned transaxle that improved handling, as well as a high-performance option that was much more powerful than the rarely-ordered 215-V8. This new V8 option for 1963 was Pontiac's 326 cubic inch (5.3 L) V8, an engine with the same external dimensions as the venerable Trophy 8 389, but different internal components designed to produce more torque relative to displacement. A new version of the automatic transmission (now officially stamped TempesTorque on the case) was redesigned to handle the new V8's additional torque. The four-speed manual transmission had not been redesigned, and very few V8-equipped Tempest models were built with this transmission. The three-speed manual transmission remained available for all engines.

The high-compression 326 V8 engine's output was 260 hp (194 kW; 264 PS) and 352 lb⋅ft (477 N⋅m) of torque (SAE Gross). The actual displacement was 336 cubic inches, but according to lore, since General Motors management edict declared that no GM compact was allowed to have an engine that was larger than the Chevrolet Corvette 327 V8, the advertised displacement for the Tempest V8 was 326 cubic inches. However, for 1964, the engine's displacement was adjusted so that it actually was 326 cubic inches, making the 1963 "326 V8" a single-year engine.

The cast-iron V8 engine increased the Tempest's weight by 260 lb (120 kg) over the weight of a Tempest equipped with a Trophy 4 engine; front/rear weight distribution changed somewhat to 54/46. Performance with a 326-powered Tempest was strong enough that Car Life magazine wrote "No one will wonder why they didn't use the 389." Fuel economy with the 326 could be as high as 19 mpg. The V8 option proved popular: 52 percent of the 131,490 Tempests and LeMans models sold in the 1963 model year were ordered with it.

=== Super Duty ===
Perhaps the most famous of all Tempests were the twelve 1963 "Super Duty" cars built to compete in the NHRA Factory Experimental class. These were assembled at the Pontiac plant in Michigan over Christmas 1962 with the knowledge of an impending General Motors ban on factory racing. Among those who successfully raced them was Wild Bill Shrewsberry, who turned low 12-second quarter-mile runs in the 1963 NHRA Winter Nationals driving for Mickey Thompson. Shrewsberry still owns his car, and it is still equipped with Pontiac's "Powershift" transaxle as retrofitted later in the 1963 season. Developed specifically for the Super Duty model, this was essentially two Chevrolet Powerglide automatics in a single four-speed unit, allowing clutchless shifting in much the same manner as modern drag racing transmissions do.

On October 31, 2008, one of the rarest factory race cars, the missing Stan Antlocer Super Duty Tempest Le Mans Coupe, was auctioned on eBay. The seller started the auction at $500 being unaware of the car's true value. Eventually, the car was sold for $226,521.

== Second generation (1964–1967) ==
Second generation
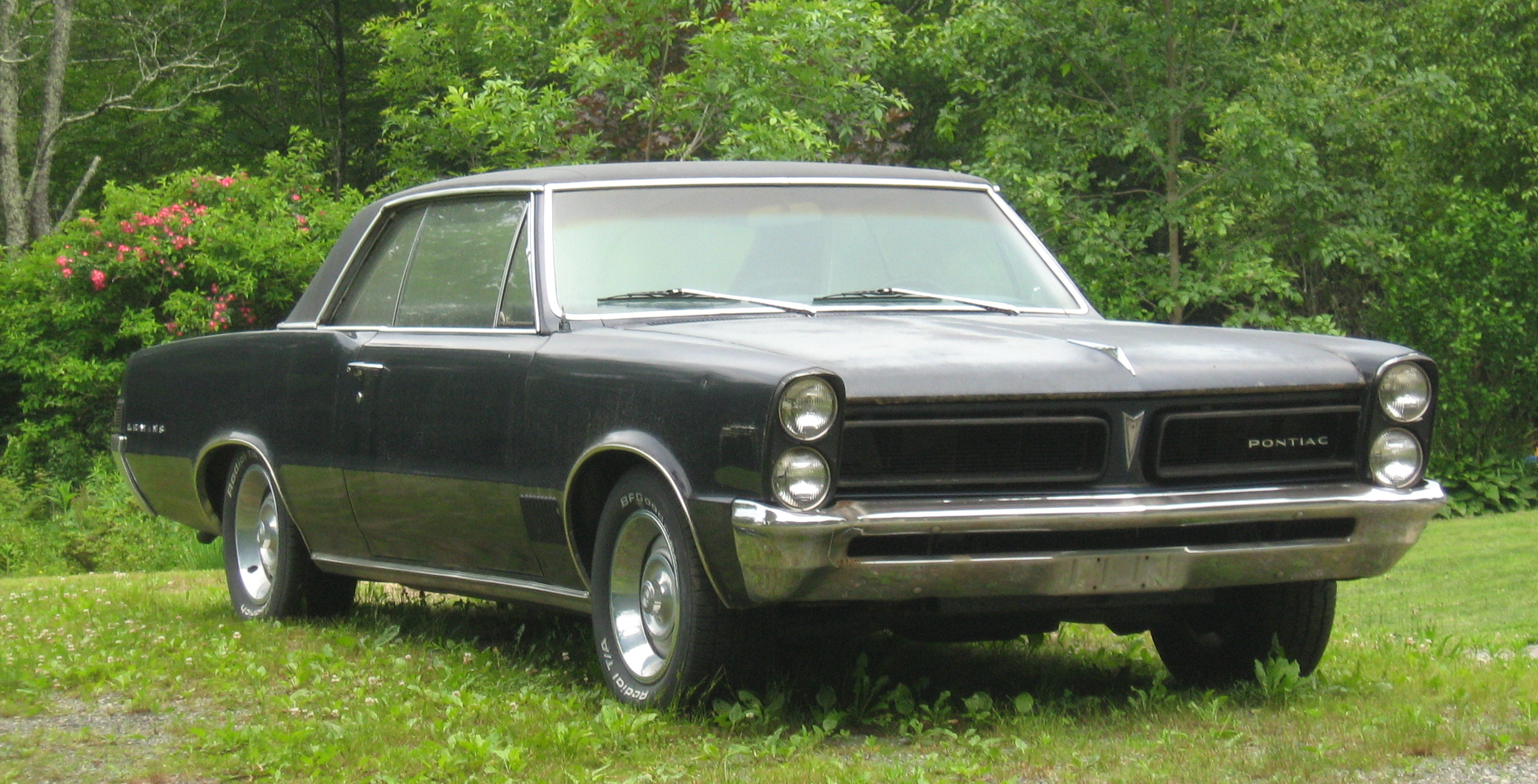
- 1965 Pontiac Tempest LeMans Hardtop Coupe

Overview
- Model years: 1964–1967
- Assembly: (Main Plant): Pontiac Assembly, Pontiac MI, US (Branch Assembly, US); Baltimore Assembly, Baltimore, Maryland; Framingham Assembly, Framingham, Massachusetts; Fremont Assembly, Fremont, California; Leeds Assembly, Kansas City, Missouri

Body and chassis
- Class: Mid-size
- Body style: 2-door coupe 2-door hardtop 2-door convertible 4-door Safari station wagon 4-door sedan 4-door hardtop
- Layout: FR layout
- Platform: A-body
- Related: Chevrolet Chevelle; Oldsmobile F-85; Buick Special

Powertrain
- Engine: 215 cu in (3.5 L) I6; 230 cu in (3.8 L) OHC I6; 326 cu in (5.3 L) V8; 389 cu in (6.4 L) V8
- Transmission: 2-speed automatic 3-speed automatic 3-speed manual 4-speed manual

Dimensions
- Wheelbase: 115 in (2,921 mm)
- Length: 203 in (5,156 mm)

In 1964, the Tempest was redesigned as a more-conventional vehicle and enlarged from a compact to an intermediate-sized car with a 115 in (2,900 mm) wheelbase and an overall length of 203 in (5,200 mm). The unibody, curved driveshaft and transaxle were gone, replaced by a traditional front engine, front transmission, body-on-frame, and solid rear axle design used by all of GM's other cars but the Corvette and Corvair. Together with its sister cars (the Oldsmobile F-85/Cutlass and Buick Special/Skylark), the Tempest/Le Mans moved to the new A platform shared with the new Chevrolet Chevelle, and all three cars received updates and modifications standardizing them throughout—including the wheels—by GM edict. The cars were, in ascending order, base Tempest, Tempest Custom, and Le Mans.

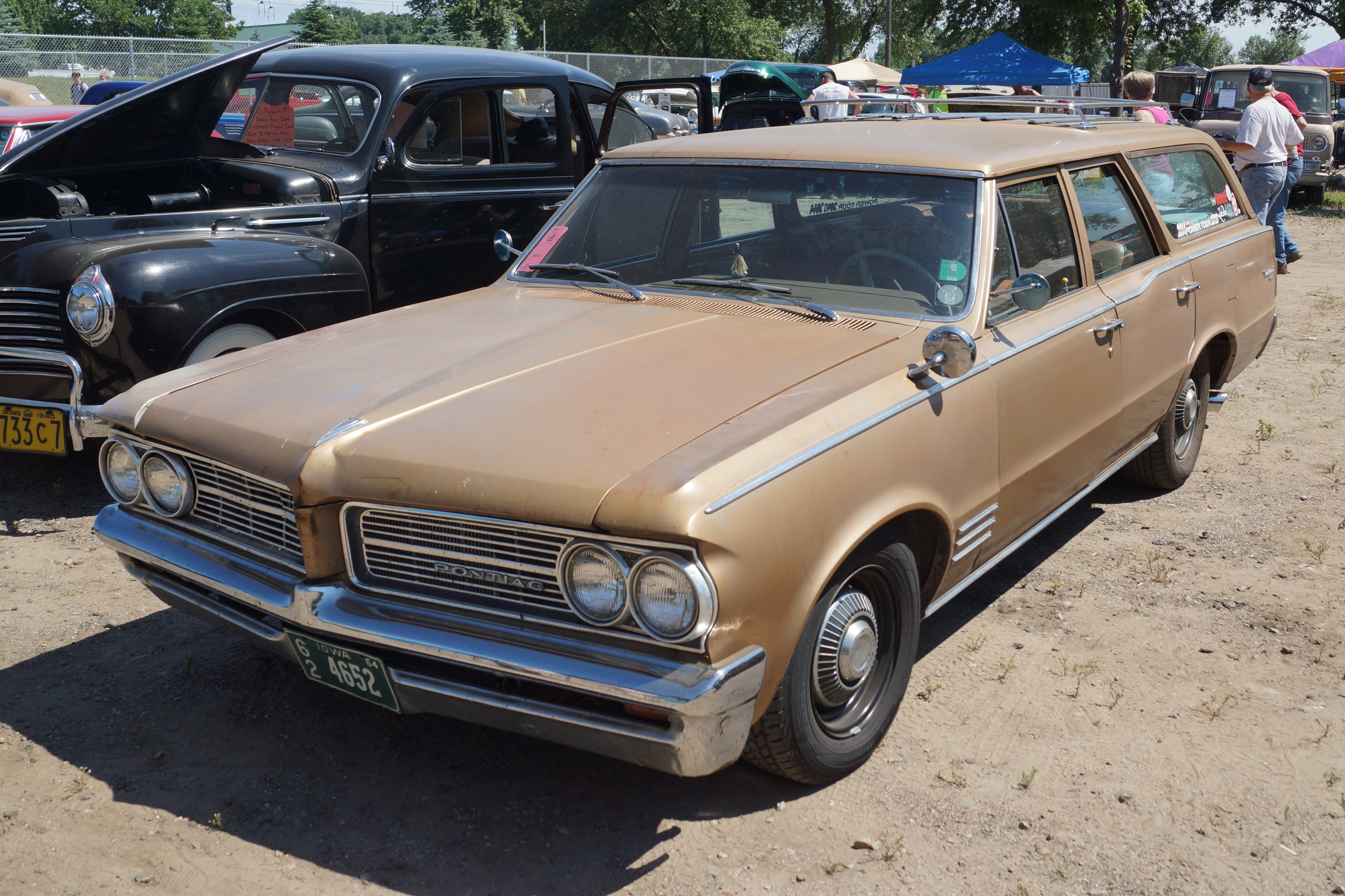
1964 Pontiac Tempest Custom Safari

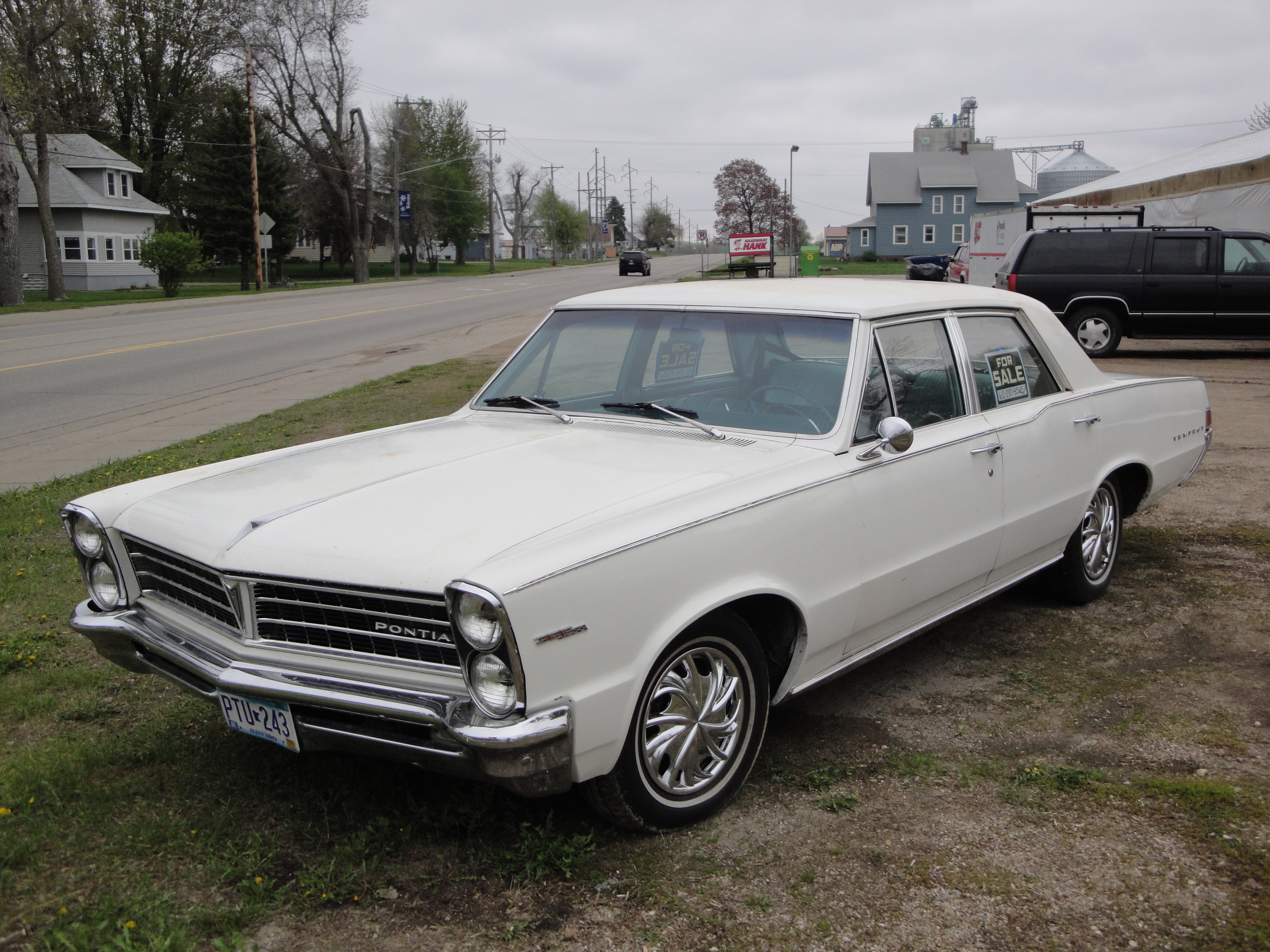
1965 Pontiac Tempest Custom 4-Door Sedan (with after-market wheel covers)

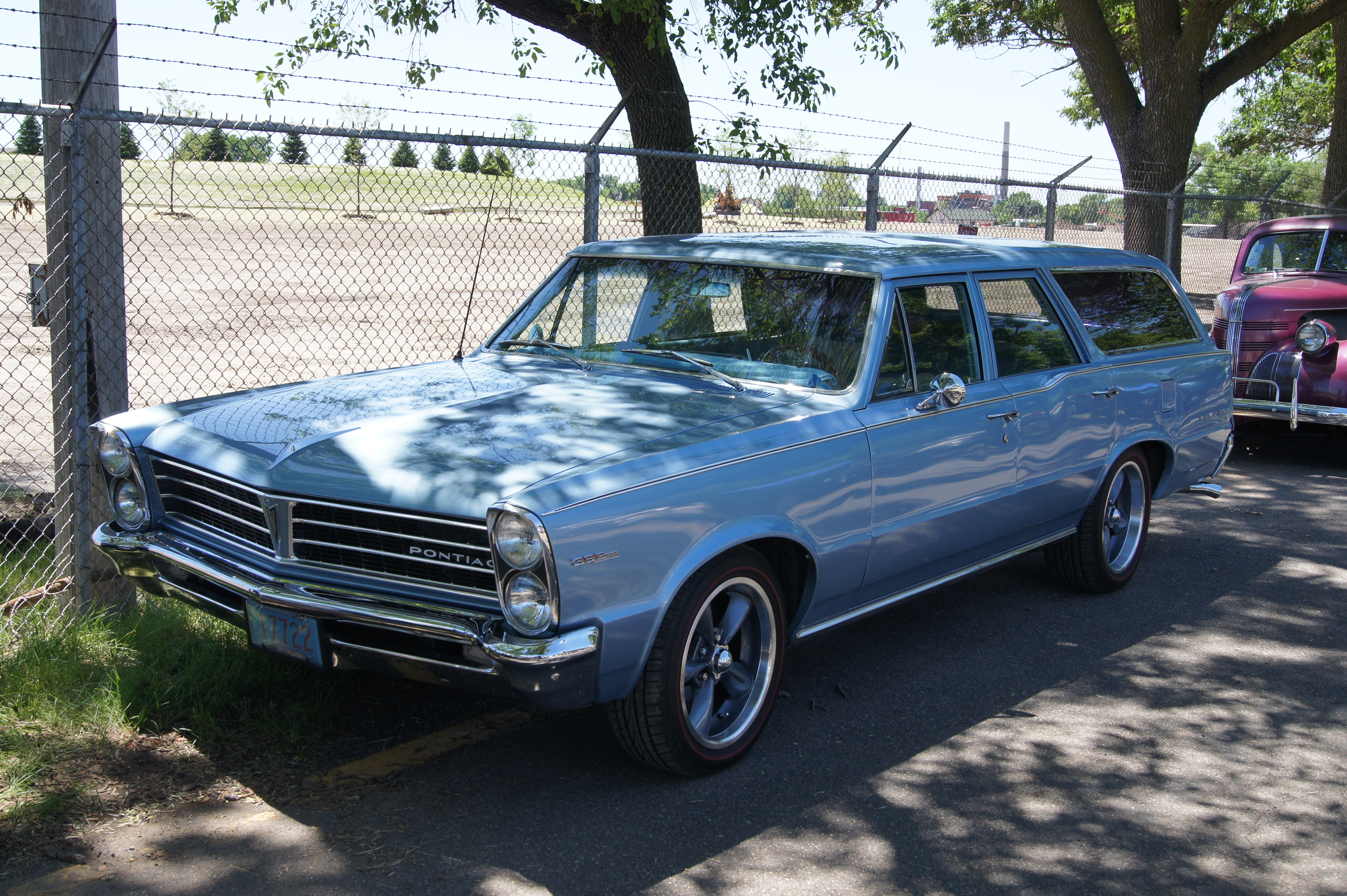
1965 Pontiac Tempest Custom Safari (with after-market wheels)

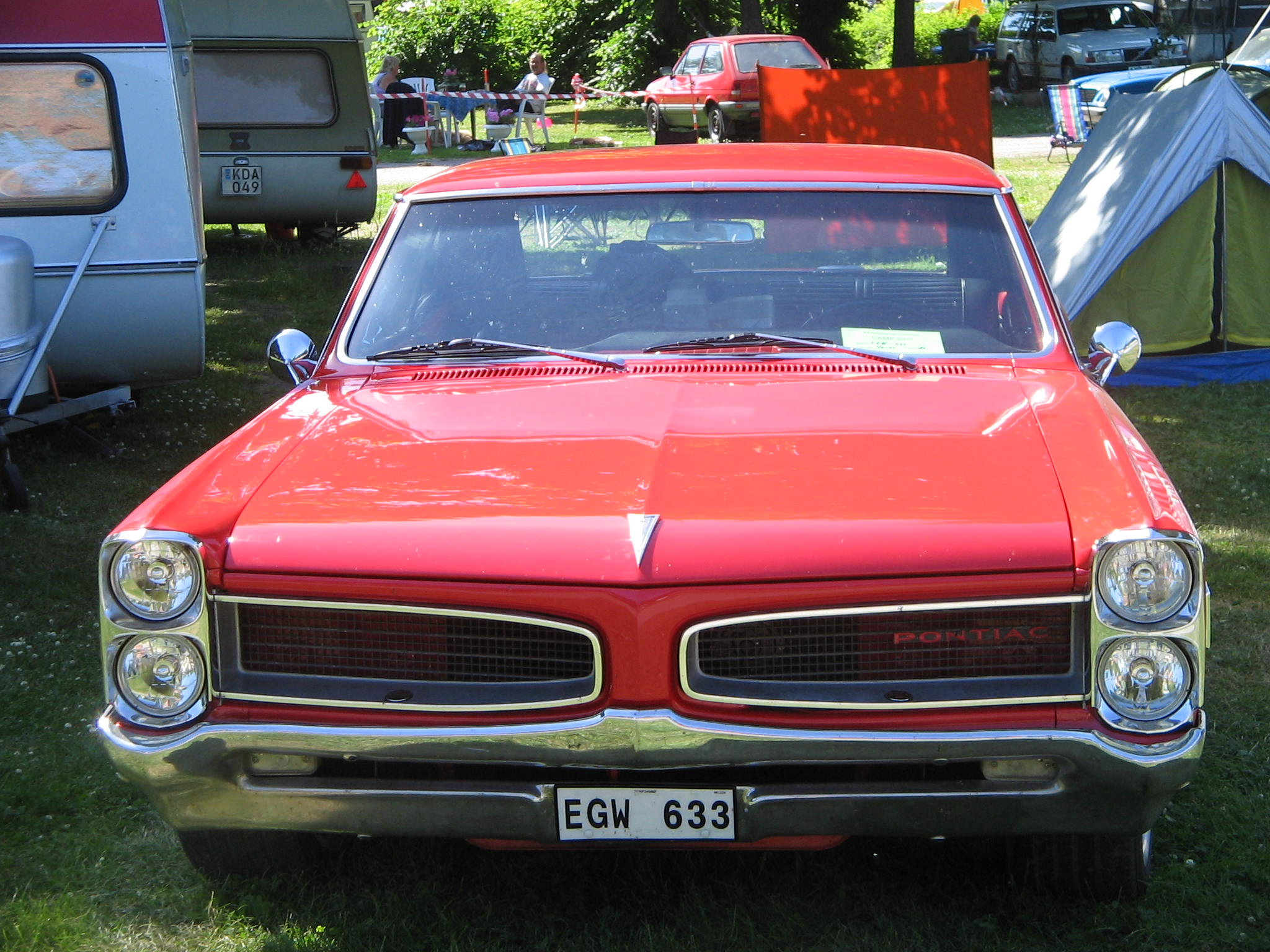
1966 Pontiac Tempest

Replacing the previous "Trophy 4" inline four-cylinder engine as standard equipment was a new 215 cu in (3.5 L) Pontiac straight six with one-barrel carburetor and 140 hp (104 kW; 142 PS). This six was basically a smaller bore (3.75") version of the 230 cu in (3.8 L) Chevrolet straight-6, offered as a Pontiac exclusive. This is one of the earliest "Corporate Engine" arrangements General Motors utilized.

Optional engines included two versions of the 326 cu in (5.3 L) Pontiac V8 introduced the previous year: a two-barrel 250 hp (186 kW; 253 PS) regular fuel option; or the 280 hp (209 kW; 284 PS) 326 HO engine with four-barrel carburetor and 10.5:1 compression ratio which required premium fuel. Transmissions included a standard three-speed manual with column shift, four-speed manual with floor-mounted Hurst shifter or a two-speed automatic; the latter was a version of Buick's Super Turbine 300.

The popularity of the high-performance 326/336 V8 in the Tempest-based LeMans package the year before prompted Pontiac to give the option a special, sporty name: the GTO, after the Italian abbreviation "Gran Turismo Omologato" used to designate specially equipped street cars homologated for racing (though the opposite, producing a mandated minimum of street-legal race cars to meet the homologation requirement, is the norm). Available with Pontiac's largest V8, the 389 cu in (6.4 L), and equipped with a four-barrel carburetor (producing 325 hp (242 kW) or the soon to become iconic 345 hp (257 kW) 3 x 2 barrel Tri-Power set-up, the GTO proved to be the defining muscle car of the 1960s. Unlike other 1964 Tempests, the GTO was available as a pillarless hardtop coupe.

Unsurprisingly, the success of the GTO prompted Oldsmobile to rush out its own high-performance option package for the F-85/Cutlass called the 442, and the next year for Buick to release a high-performance version of the Skylark called the Skylark Gran Sport, or GS. Both cars would enjoy success and join Chevrolet's Chevelle SS in GM's effort to capitalize on the exploding muscle car era.

Engine offerings for the 1965 Tempest were the same as 1964, except the 326 HO was uprated to 285 hp (213 kW; 289 PS) and the GTO 389's uprated to 335 hp (250 kW) and 360 hp (268 kW) via higher rise intake manifolds. Styling changes included a new split grille with vertical headlights similar to the larger Pontiacs, revised taillights and a more slanted rear deck. A two-door hardtop coupe was added to the Tempest Custom line, while the Le Mans got a four-door sedan with a plush interior done in Preston Cloth trim similar to the full-sized Bonneville Brougham.

A major facelift was made on the 1966 Tempest that included more rounded bodylines with a Coke-bottle effect similar to the full-sized Pontiacs. New four-door pillarless hardtop sedans were added to the Tempest Custom line. Under the hood, the Chevy-derived 215 six was replaced by a new 230 cu in (3.8 L) Pontiac overhead cam six, the only such engine found in an American production car at that time. This was also the first American-built engine to use a belt to time the camshaft to the crankshaft rather than a chain. The base OHC had a one-barrel carburetor and was rated at 165 hp (123 kW; 167 PS), designed for economy buyers. Optionally available as part of the Sprint option package on non-wagons was a four-barrel, high-compression 207 hp (154 kW; 210 PS) version of the OHC six, marketed as an alternative to higher-priced European sport sedans, which had similar OHC engines. For those wanting V8 power, the 326 and 326 HO options continued with horsepower ratings of 250 and 285 hp (213 kW; 289 PS), respectively, and GTO engines stayed the same.

Only minor changes were made to the 1967 Tempest, Custom and Le Mans models. The GTO 389 V8 was replaced by a new 400 cu in V8. The Rochester four-barrel carburetor replaced both the standard GTO Carter AFB four-barrel and the Tri-Power carburetor option. The Turbo Hydromatic TH-400 replaced the previous Buick Super Turbine two speed automatic. The 326 cu in V8's remained unchanged. The four-barrel OHC six was uprated to 215 hp (160 kW; 218 PS). Front disc brakes were a new option along with a stereo 8-track tape player and hood-mounted tachometer. All 1967 Pontiacs got GM's safety package, mandated by Federal law, which included a dual-circuit braking system, energy absorbing steering column, wheel, and interior, shoulder belt anchors, four-way hazard flashers, and a new directional signal control that could be "flicked" for lane changes.

== Third generation (1968–1970) ==
Third generation
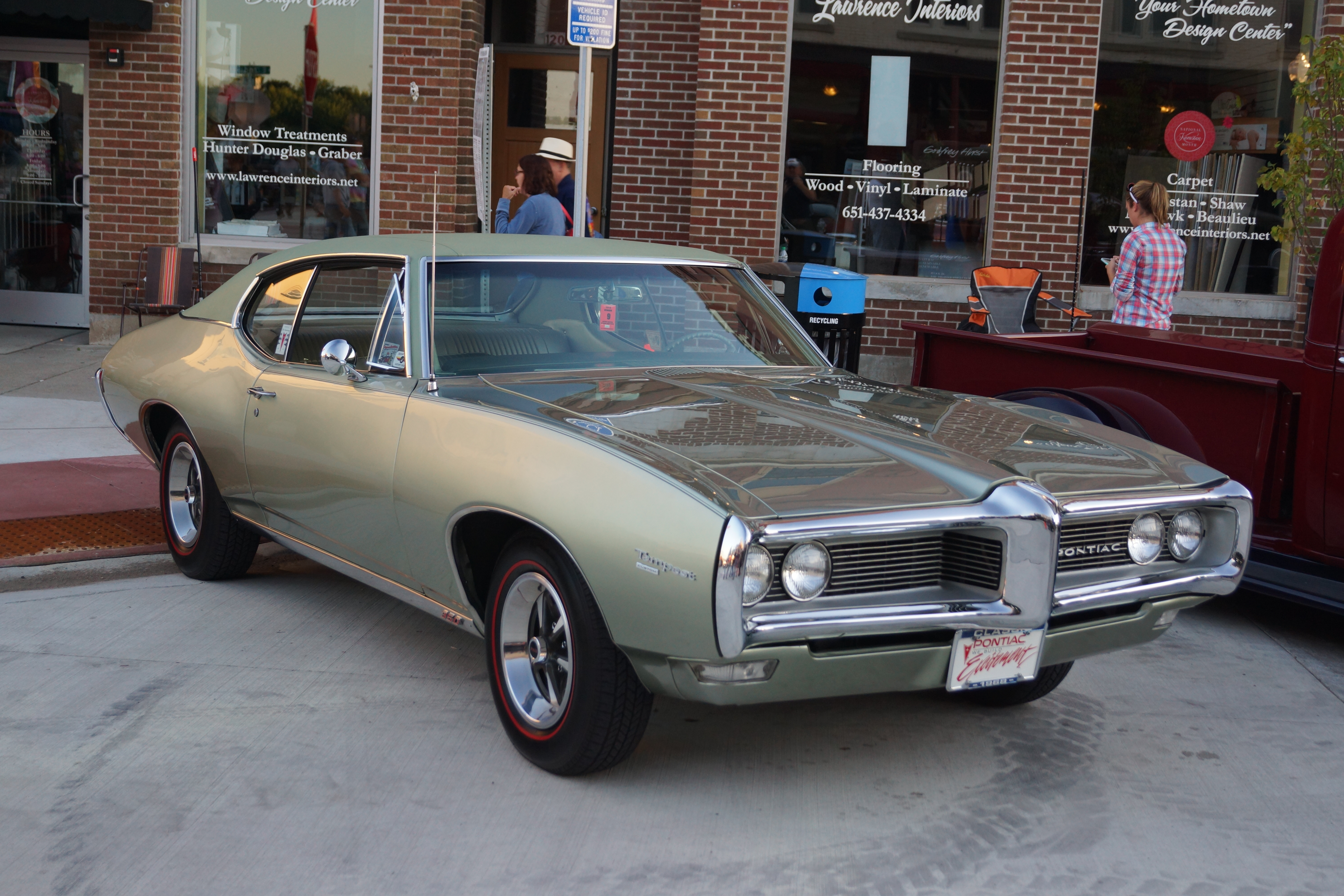
- 1968 Pontiac Tempest Custom Sports Coupe

Overview
- Model years: 1968-1970
- Assembly: (Main Plant): Pontiac Assembly, Pontiac MI, US (Branch Assembly); Arlington Assembly, Arlington, Texas; Baltimore Assembly, Baltimore, Maryland; Framingham Assembly, Framingham, Massachusetts; Fremont Assembly, Fremont, California; Leeds Assembly, Kansas City, Missouri

Body and chassis
- Class: Mid-size
- Body style: 2-door coupe 2-door hardtop 2-door convertible 4-door station wagon 4-door sedan 4-door hardtop
- Layout: FR layout
- Platform: A-body
- Related: Chevrolet Chevelle; Pontiac Le Mans; Oldsmobile Cutlass; Buick Special; Buick Skylark

Powertrain
- Engine: 250 cu in (4.1 L) OHC I6; 250 cu in (4.1 L) Chevrolet I6; 350 cu in (5.7 L) Pontiac V8; 400 cu in (6.6 L) Pontiac V8
- Transmission: 2-speed automatic 3-speed automatic 3-speed manual 4-speed manual

A completely restyled Tempest was introduced for 1968 with streamlined Coke bottle styling, concealed windshield wipers, and a return to horizontal headlights. Two-door models rode on a 112 in (2,800 mm) wheelbase and four-door models on 116 in (2,900 mm). The 230 cu in overhead cam sixes were enlarged to 250 cu in, with horsepower ratings unchanged while the 326 V8 was replaced by a new 350 cu in (5.7 L) V8 with horsepower ratings of 250 with two-barrel or 320 with four-barrel carb. The same lineup of models including the base Tempest, Tempest Custom and Le Mans continued as in previous years.

Other than elimination of vent windows on hardtop coupes, styling only received minor revisions for 1969, when the Tempest Custom was renamed the Custom S for this one year. However, model offerings were the same as 1968. A new three-speed Turbo Hydra-matic 350 automatic transmission was introduced and available with all engines as an alternative to the older two-speed. Engine offerings were the same as before except for the 350 HO V8 engine gaining five-horsepower to 325. A new locking steering column with relocated ignition switch was introduced and front seat headrests became standard equipment. A new GTO option became available, The Judge. Featuring special decals, two Ram Air versions of Pontiac's 400 engine, and a rear spoiler, The Judge was originally conceived as a barebones muscle car based on the Tempest to compete with the new sub-$3,000 Plymouth Roadrunner. Plans for the new model were terminated, and Pontiac division head John DeLorean opted to create a GTO variant instead.

Minor styling revisions, that included a new front grille treatment, highlighted the 1970 Tempest, which was the final year for the nameplate. Initially, the line was down to just two- and four-door sedans but expanded at mid-year with the introduction of the low-priced T-37 hardtop coupe, billed as GM's lowest-priced hardtop coupe. The Custom S became the Le Mans this year and the previous Le Mans series was renamed the Le Mans Sport. The Pontiac-built OHC six-cylinder engine was replaced by a Chevy-built 250 in^{3} inline six while the 350 V8 was down to a two-barrel 255 hp (190 kW; 259 PS) version. New engine offerings included 400 in^{3} V8s rated at 265 hp (198 kW; 269 PS) with two-barrel carburetor and 8.6:1 compression ratio or 330 with four-barrel and 10.25:1 compression.

The Tempest nameplate was phased out after the 1970 model year. For 1971, it was replaced by a new T-37 series that included each of the three bodystyles offered on the 1970 Tempest and T-37. After this year, the T-37 was dropped. In 1972 all Pontiac intermediates took the Le Mans nameplate except the GTO.

=== Tempest Custom S ===
The Pontiac Tempest Custom S was a one-year only Pontiac nameplate offered during the 1969 model year car as a replacement for the "Tempest Custom" trim level in the Division's line-up. Originally to be called the "Pontiac TC", it was slotted between the Tempest and LeMans in price and features.

The Custom S was available in six different body designs: two-door convertible, hardtop coupe, sports coupe, a 4-door sedan, a 4-door hardtop, and a station wagon. The sports coupe can be differentiated from the hardtop by the presence of a vent window in the front door. Interior and exterior appointments fell between the Tempest and the LeMans and GTO.

The Custom S came standard with Pontiac's unique overhead camshaft OHC-6 175 hp (130 kW) 250 cu in (4.1 L) engine. Also available was a 230 hp (170 kW) 265 ft⋅lbf (359 N⋅m) TQ OHC inline 6-cylinder with the "Sprint" package, a 265 hp (198 kW) overhead valve pushrod V8 350 cu in (5.7 L), and a 330 hp (250 kW) version of the same engine with higher compression and a 4-barrel carburetor.

== Fourth generation (1987–1991) ==
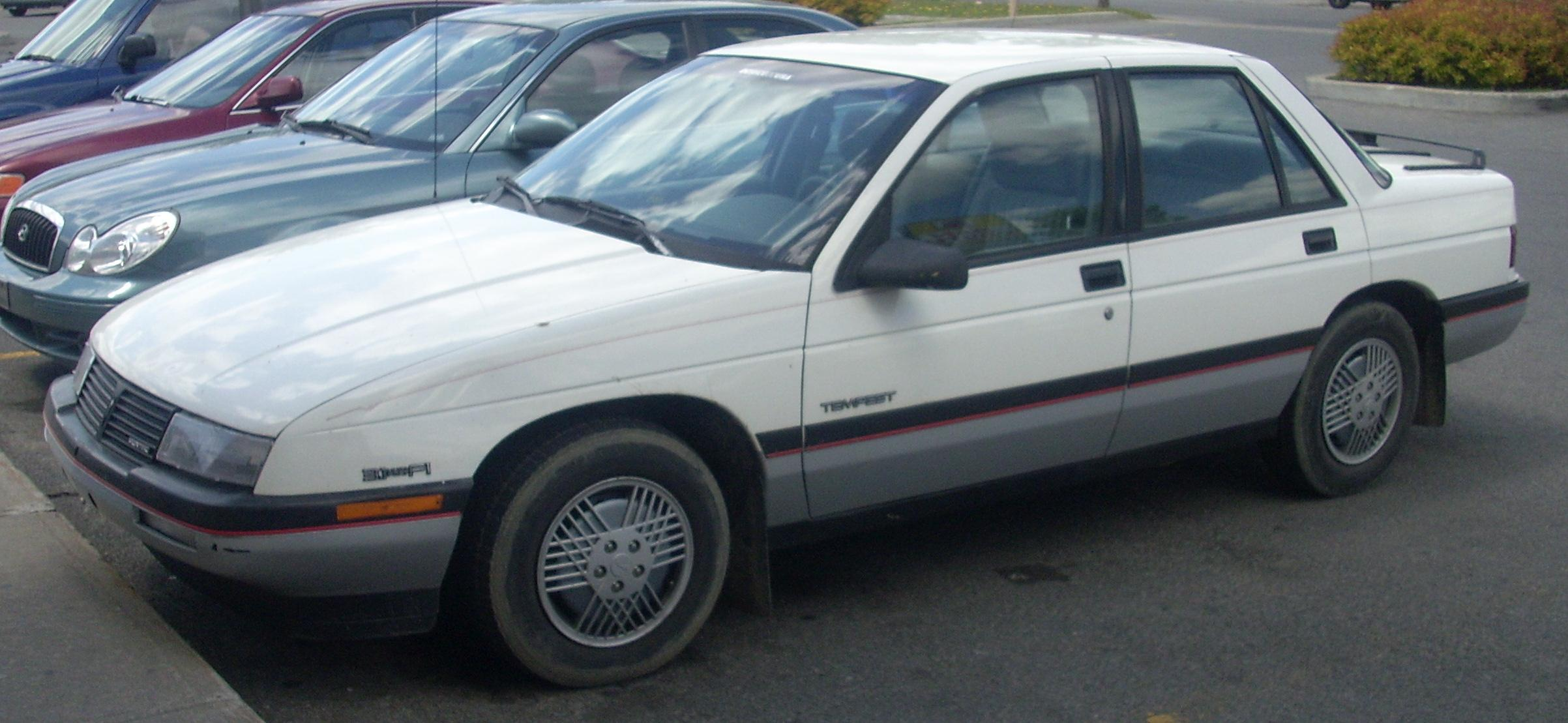
Pontiac Tempest Sedan

Pontiac marketed a rebadged version of the compact L-body Chevrolet Corsica as Tempest, for Canada, Israel and GCC only, beginning in model year 1987. The Tempest was built alongside the Corsica at the Wilmington Assembly plant in Wilmington, Delaware. Discontinued in 1991, the Tempest was replaced with the Grand Am sedan. The 1987-1991 Pontiac Tempest came in two trim levels, base (equivalent to the U.S. Corsica LT) and LE (equivalent to the U.S. Corsica LTZ) The main differences that separates the Tempest from its L-Body twin are different grille, emblems and taillights (the taillights were later adopted as the U.S. Corsica's taillights). The only other differences were wheel options, DRLs and a metric instrument cluster. This model was also sold briefly in Israel; there are brochures showing Canadian-spec models from 1990/1991.
