= List of Pawn Stars episodes =

American reality television series episodes

Pawn Stars is an American reality television series that premiered on History on July 19, 2009. The series is filmed in Las Vegas, Nevada, where it chronicles the activities at the World Famous Gold & Silver Pawn Shop, a 24-hour family business operated by patriarch Richard "Old Man" Harrison, his son Rick Harrison, Rick's son Corey "Big Hoss" Harrison, and Corey's childhood friend, Austin "Chumlee" Russell. The descriptions of the items listed in this article reflect those given by their sellers and staff in the episodes, prior to their appraisal by experts as to their authenticity, unless otherwise noted.

== Series overview ==
Season	Episodes	Originally released	
Season	Episodes	First released	Last released
1	25	July 19, 2009	December 27, 2009
2	33	January 18, 2010	July 12, 2010
3	30	August 16, 2010	March 28, 2011
4	38	April 4, 2011	November 8, 2011
5	30	November 28, 2011	March 5, 2012
6	28	April 9, 2012	September 3, 2012
7	34	November 5, 2012	March 11, 2013
8	46	May 30, 2013	December 26, 2013
9	52	January 2, 2014	June 26, 2014
10	47	July 10, 2014	December 22, 2014
11	42	January 8, 2015	August 10, 2015
12	45	October 22, 2015	July 20, 2016
13	29	July 27, 2016	February 6, 2017
14	30	April 10, 2017	August 28, 2017
15	30	October 16, 2017	June 27, 2018
16	20	January 21, 2019	August 19, 2019
17	28	October 21, 2019	July 27, 2020
18	26	November 16, 2020	September 25, 2021
19	14	October 2, 2021	December 18, 2021
20	13	April 23, 2022	November 2, 2022
21	15	March 15, 2023	June 28, 2023
22	10	July 10, 2024	September 25, 2024
23	10	January 22, 2025	April 2, 2025
24	10	January 7, 2026	March 18, 2026
25	TBA	October 7, 2026	TBA

== Episodes ==
=== Season 1 (2009) ===
No. overall	No. in season	Title	Original release date
1	1	"Boom or Bust"	July 19, 2009
Items appraised include an 1890 Hotchkiss gun used during the American Indian Wars that could be worth up to $40,000 if it can be authenticated with a test firing; a replica suit of Roman armor brought in by a former Caesars Palace employee; and a Knapp custom table saw, whose transportation back to the shop proves challenging. After the Old Man misidentifies a Carson City silver dollar, he is cajoled into getting an eye exam.
2	2	"Confederate Conundrum"	July 19, 2009
Items appraised include an autographed Chuck Berry Fender guitar; a Civil War cavalry saber whose unsharpened blade gives Rick cause for doubt; a Native American energy totem; and a 1916 National Cash Register. The Old Man and Corey form a bet on Corey's ability to resell a Rolex GMT for more than $4,800 that would require either the Old Man to wear Ed Hardy pants to work, or Corey to wear a suit and tie.
3	3	"Sink or Sell"	July 26, 2009
Items appraised include an 1849 Colt revolver; a 1954 Gretsch guitar whose owner says was used by Robert Duvall in the 1983 film Tender Mercies; three 1967 Salvador Dalí artist's proof woodcut prints; and a 1984 Chris-Craft boat that Corey buys without testing it first, much to his father and grandfather's anger.
4	4	"Knights in Fake Armor?"	July 26, 2009
Items appraised include a medieval jousting helmet; a Big Dog custom chopper; a 1981 tabletop Pac-Man video game; and an 1884 Springfield Trapdoor rifle that the Harrisons test in the hopes that it still fires.
5	5	"Gangsters & Guitars"	August 2, 2009
Items appraised include a 1962 Lincoln Continental whose restoration costs may break the shop's investment; a 1942 Gibson L-7 guitar whose owner claims was played for Al Capone on his birthday; Confederate money; and an Atari 2600 home video game console with a collection of game cartridges.
6	6	"Damn Yankees"	August 2, 2009
Items appraised include a baseball autographed by the 1951 World Series Champion New York Yankees that needs to be authenticated; a 25-piece Knights of the Round Table set cast in pewter; and a 1902 West Point Cadet jacket owned by World War II Lieutenant General Oscar Griswold. After Rick's wife asks him to give his niece, Kirsten, a job at the shop, Rick offers Corey his long-desired raise if he can successfully train her to distinguish a real Rolex watch from a fake one.
7	7	"Brothels & Busses"	August 9, 2009
Items appraised include a 1750 blunderbuss gun whose owner needs to buy an engagement ring; a fighter jet ejection seat claimed to be from World War II; a collection of autographed Vegas celebrity photos that once belonged to a brothel owner; and a 1966 Schwinn Sting-Ray bicycle. The Old Man sets up a cuss jar due to habitual swearing on the part of the shop's staff.
8	8	"Time Machines"	August 16, 2009
Items appraised include a dilapidated 1950s Coca-Cola machine brought in by Ron Dale (the brother of recurring restoration expert Rick Dale and future cast member of American Restoration); an 18th-century flintlock pistol that needs authentication; a collection of comic books published from the 1960s to the 1990s; a 1941 Philco radio; and a piece of the Berlin Wall.
9	9	"Rope a Dope"	August 23, 2009
Items appraised include two 1929 Ford Model A cars, a Coupe and a Roadster, with each car having a different owner; a collection of World War II bond posters; and a calf-roping machine. Rick and Richard are forced to address Peaches' habitual lateness.
10	10	"Rick's Big Bet"	August 30, 2009
Items appraised include a 1930s Wayne gas pump that needs to be restored; a 1930s slot machine; and three World War II bayonets whose modifications cause concern for Rick. After Corey's knowledge of the shop's inventory is called into question, Rick offers to give him a $2,500 bonus if he passes a quiz or place him on the graveyard shift if he fails.
11	11	"John Hancock's Hancock"	September 6, 2009
Items appraised include a framed document signed by John Hancock; a bullwhip whose owner says was sold to him by a stuntman who used it in one of the Indiana Jones films; and a unique glass katana sword whose owner says he forged it to see if it could be done. The purchase of a stolen watch by one of the staff results in a visit by the police and a test given to Corey and Chumlee by Rick.
12	12	"Plane Crazy"	September 13, 2009
Items appraised include a 1735 map of Boston; a 2006 Yamaha YZ250 dirt bike; and a 1976 Piper Warrior airplane. After Chumlee buys a fake etching for $300, Rick tries to train him to properly identify real etchings, and gives him a test.
13	13	"Peaches & Pinups"	September 20, 2009
Items appraised include a World War II U.S. Army Air Corps uniform; a 1970s Barnett crossbow that hasn't been fired in almost 40 years; a 1929 Remington portable typewriter; and a collection of Playboy magazines that belonged to the seller's husband. Rick tries to sell a couple one of the shop's most prized items, a $10,000 Ormolu clock, a.k.a. "The Death Clock". Another customer who collects cufflinks displays a surprising amount of knowledge of the Georg Jensen cufflinks Rick has in the store.
14	14	"Old Man's Gamble"	September 27, 2009
Items appraised include a racing suit used in the 2001 film Driven; a 1914 star note $20 bill, on which Rick needs expert advice; a 1982 Baldwin piano; and a 1979 Kiss pinball machine. Also, after Corey buys a 1982 Harley Davidson motorcycle for $7,000, Chumlee wants to purchase it from the shop himself, though the Old Man has doubts that he can raise the money.
15	15	"Fired Up"	November 30, 2009
Items appraised include a flintlock musketoon; a wooden airplane propeller that may have been a gift from Charles Lindbergh; and a 1990 Mercedes-Benz keychain allegedly belonging to Willie Nelson. Also, Rick's doctor has informed him that he is suffering from too much stress.
16	16	"Sharks and Cobras"	November 30, 2009
Items appraised include a 1965 Shelby Cobra bodyframe that requires authentication; a World War II-era chronometer; a collection of megalodon teeth; and a Cobra 1.8 power kite.
17	17	"Old Man's Booty"	December 7, 2009
Items appraised include two World War I-era trench knives; a locked treasure chest whose contents are unknown; and a Russian Militsiya police cap, which is immediately rejected when the seller claims to have stolen it while drunk during a trip to Russia. Rick and Corey secretly take the Old Man's prized 1966 Chrysler Imperial to have it restored as a 50th wedding anniversary gift, though they tell him that they sold it to a customer who wanted to convert it into a lowrider.
18	18	"A Shot and a Shave"	December 7, 2009
Items appraised include an 1845 Harpers Ferry musket; a quilt covered with hundreds of celebrity signatures; an ice marker and ATM receipt from McMurdo Station in Antarctica; and a 1950s barber chair that causes Rick to reminisce about days gone by.
19	19	"Hot Air Buffoon"	December 14, 2009
Items appraised include a pair of 1925 McKenzie Mitts handcuffs, a bottle of Prohibition-era whisky; and a Gibson Les Paul guitar whose seller claims is from 1960 but whose true date Rick feels is uncertain. To expand the shop's inventory, Corey buys a 2003 Cameron A250 hot air balloon for $38,000, much to Rick's anger, who requires Corey to consult him first when spending more than $10,000 on an item.
20	20	"Steaks at Stake"	December 14, 2009
Items appraised include three Colonial era coat buttons; a collection of Montie Montana memorabilia; a 1915 comptometer; and a 2005 Suzuki GSX-R 1300 Hayabusa motorcycle. Upset over dwindling profit margins, the Old Man offers a steak dinner and $500 prize to whoever exhibits the highest profit margin by the end of the month.
21	21	"A Christmas Special"	December 21, 2009
In this clip episode, as Rick, Corey, and Chumlee prepare to be taken out by a grumpy Richard to a surprise location to celebrate Christmas, they reminisce about the purchases they've made over the course of the past year.
22	22	"Secret Santa"	December 21, 2009
The staff engages in a Secret Santa gift exchange. Items appraised include American Revolutionary War-era currency; a battle axe purported to be from the 15th century; and a 1950 ship's camera purported to be from the USS Wisconsin.
23	23	"Pawn Shop Pinot"	December 21, 2009
Items appraised include a 16th-century replica signal cannon that makes Rick question if it is truly a replica; a 2007 Volvo semi truck used as collateral for a loan; a 19th-century demijohn that Chumlee promptly uses to make his own foot-crushed wine; and a 1923 Louis Vuitton trunk.
24	24	"Bikes and Blades"	December 27, 2009
Items appraised include a 19th-century miniature reproduction of a 16th-century suit of armor; a 1940 quartermaster spyglass; V-44 and Mark 1 military knives whose seller says his grandfather smuggled back from World War II; and a customized 1996 Harley Road King motorcycle whose paint job may limit its range of potential customers.
25	25	"Rick's Bad Day"	December 27, 2009
Items appraised include a LeCoultre "perpetual motion" Atmos clock; two halberd axes; an antique ball and chain; a fake Ford's Theatre playbill for the night of Abraham Lincoln's assassination; and an antique potty chair. A number of unfortunate events, from bad purchases to multiple mishaps involving destroyed or broken merchandise, make it a bad day for Rick and the others.

=== Season 2 (2010) ===
No. overall	No. in season	Title	Original release date
26	1	"Chum Goes AWOL"	January 18, 2010
Items appraised include a 1901 Edison phonograph; an AYT XP 2200 speedboat in need of restoration; a collection of gold demon figurines painted black; a 1922 savings book, and a Binion's playing card vending machine. Chumlee gets sent to the Old Man's house to pick up a necklace a customer is interested in buying, but takes his time doing it.
27	2	"Wheels"	January 18, 2010
Items appraised include a Dutch East India ship's bell supposedly from a 1602 shipwreck; a vintage roulette wheel; a 1970s Indian racing mini motorcycle; and two Scottish daggers whose owner claims are 200 years old.
28	3	"Shocking Chum"	January 25, 2010
Items appraised include a 1948 portable electric shock therapy machine; a bag filled with antique stamps; a 2006 Yamaha Rhino off-road vehicle; and a clump of silver 1702 rupees discovered as a part of sunken treasure in 1961 by Arthur C. Clarke's team, from the Great Basses wreck.
29	4	"Pezzed Off"	January 25, 2010
Items appraised include an 18th-century French double-barrel coach gun; a collection of Pez dispensers from the 1960s and 1970s; a 1932-S Washington quarter; and a U.S. Navy uniform whose time period of origin becomes the point of a bet between Rick and the Old Man.
30	5	"Guns and Rangers"	February 1, 2010
Items appraised include a 1997 NASCAR trophy that was presented to Jeff Gordon; tiny antique portraits of Napoleon Bonaparte and Joséphine de Beauharnais; an antique matchlock key gun dating from about the 17th century; an ivory tusk that Rick immediately rejects; and a life-size fiberglass Power Ranger whose owner refurbished and outfitted with a cell phone charger after finding it in a dumpster.
31	6	"Tattoos and Tantrums"	February 1, 2010
Items appraised include an 1888 McClellan saddle purported to have been used by Kevin Costner in the film Dances with Wolves; an 1886 Winchester rifle; and an early-20th-century cast-iron sheet metal shear. Corey buys a tattoo kit for $350 that he then takes to a tattoo shop to trade for a tattoo, much to the irritation of his father and grandfather.
32	7	"Pinball Wizards"	February 8, 2010
Items appraised include a 1973 Bally's "Odds & Evens" pinball machine whose owner presents it, disassembled, to Corey and a surprisingly knowledgeable Chumlee; a 1924 Saint-Gaudens double eagle $20 gold coin; a Segway i2 whose owner wishes to upgrade to an offroad model; a portable gramophone dated between 1931 and 1944; and a couch shaped like the rear end of a Shelby Cobra.
33	8	"Chopper Gamble"	February 8, 2010
Items appraised include a 1768 lottery ticket signed by George Washington; five 1967 Pete Rose baseball cards; a 1992 crashed Schweizer 300C helicopter in need of restoration, whose space needs are a concern for the Old Man; and a pair of antique Plug 8 handcuffs.
34	9	"Spooning Paul Revere"	February 15, 2010
Items appraised include a 19th-century handmade Anton Schneider cuckoo clock; an antique thermometer that features the Celsius, Fahrenheit, and Réaumur scales; a silver table spoon said to have been made by Paul Revere; and a Kam-Act MK-2 archery bow.
35	10	"Off the Wagon"	February 15, 2010
Items appraised include an 1890 Auto Wheel coaster wagon; a Civil War sword believed to have belonged to a Confederate officer; a cast iron, Kelsey Excelsior printing press from the 19th century; and a rare 1942 Saroléa motorcycle that Corey tries to convince Rick can turn a profit if restored.
36	11	"Fortune in Flames"	March 1, 2010
Items appraised include a U.S. military flamethrower claimed to have been used during World War I; a 1963 Volkswagen Baja Bug; and a Manhattan Firearms pepper-box revolver from the mid-19th century. Corey and Chumlee also want to buy a gypsy fortune teller machine whose owner is auctioning it off and refuses to sell it prior to auction.
37	12	"Backroom Brawl"	March 1, 2010
Items appraised include a pocket-sized ivory sundial believed to be from the 17th century; an album of original 1963 Jimmy Hoffa photographs; and a 1964 Midway "Rifle Champ" sharpshooting arcade game. Rick and the Old Man's complaints to Corey about the disorganized back room, where thousands of pawned items are kept, leads to the discovery of a bronze 1986 art deco statue by Erté called La Danseuse (The Dancer), which appears to be valuable.
38	13	"Big Guns"	March 8, 2010
Items appraised include two scaled up, World War II model training rifles; a 1965 Gilbert Erector Set; two Soviet launch keys whose owner claims were used to launch ICBMs; a 1920s Gibson banjo ukulele; and a 1940 steel Supermen of America membership ring.
39	14	"Flight of the Chum"	March 8, 2010
Items appraised include a Perseus statue by Émile Louis Picault, whose owner claims is an 1888 original; a watchmaker's staking kit; a rare 1950s Las Vegas Club $5 casino chip; a jersey autographed by Lou Gehrig; and a vintage Schweizer SGS 2–33 glider that needs restoration.
40	15	"Bumpy Ride"	March 29, 2010
Items appraised include Ron Dunbar and General Johnson's 1970 Grammy Award for Best Rhythm and Blues Song; a 1930s Coca-Cola salesman sampler cooler; a 1676 Spanish silver coin; a rickshaw once used by Siegfried and Roy's tiger show; and a 1777 French musket.
41	16	"Helmet Head"	April 5, 2010
Items appraised include a 1964 Austin-Healey Sprite car; an antique diving helmet authenticated to date from 1865 to 1870; three U.S. fractional currency notes; a Miami Heat 2006 NBA Championship ring; and an antique wooden chest that was purchased at a Miami pirate store, which appears, to the Old Man, to be rather modern.
42	17	"Bow Legged"	April 12, 2010
Items appraised include an 18th-century pegleg; an all-wooden motorcycle; a flintlock pistol and kindjal dagger from the Ottoman Empire; a 2010 Hoyt carbon matrix compound bow, which is said to be the best, strongest, and most expensive bow ever made; and an antique Kalliope Musikwerke music box that Rick estimates to be about 130 years old.
43	18	"Hell Week"	April 19, 2010
Items appraised include a 19th-century Fairbanks Morse & Co. coffee grinder; a 1967 The Rat Patrol lunchbox; a hard-carved, antique Native American tobacco store statue; and an 8mm home movie of President Franklin D. Roosevelt, dated between 1939 and 1945. When the subject of Corey and Chumlee's weight comes up, Rick challenges them to an obstacle course, with the loser required to buy lunch for a week. (Note: The date of the coffee grinder and the type of film used for the home movie is derived from History.com, accessed April 19, 2010. The same site also gives the 1980s as the date of the lunchbox, which is clearly an error, as the seller in the episode explicitly said it was from 1967, which is in line with when The Rat Patrol originally aired on ABC. Title cards seen in the episode indicate the home movie is dated "1939 or later", but 1945 is given as the closing end of the range in this article, since that is when President Franklin Roosevelt died.)
44	19	"Zzzzzz"	April 25, 2010
Items appraised include an 1884 single-action Colt revolver whose nickel plating concerns Rick; a collection of 26 U.S. Presidential campaign buttons from between the 1860s and the 1960s; a Country Craftsman reproduction of an antique spinning wheel; and a commercial-grade Astra Mega I espresso machine and coffee grinder, which Chumlee wishes to use to address the Old Man's more frequently napping of late.
45	20	"The British Are Coming"	April 25, 2010
Items appraised include a 1775 war bond engraved by Paul Revere right after the American Revolutionary War began; a pneumatic-powered, music-playing, 1981 replica of a 1909 fire engine; a 1965 Chevrolet Impala station wagon whose engine swap and other modifications dissatisfy Rick and the Old Man; and a 1946 Seeburg jukebox that needs extensive restoration.
46	21	"License to Pawn"	May 2, 2010
Items appraised include an antique Ives toy train set that was found in a 120-year-old house; an 1862 three-cent George Washington postage stamp encased in a token; a 1980 10th anniversary edition Datsun 280ZX; a copy of the final draft script to the James Bond movie Goldfinger, whose seller says was given to him by actor Harold Sakata, who played Oddjob in the film and whom he was close friends with; and a 19th-century antique tricycle that Rick thinks is a reproduction.
47	22	"Trail Breaker"	June 7, 2010
Items appraised include a 1969 Rokon Trail-Breaker 2-wheel drive offroad motorcycle; a 1715 Lima escudo Spanish fleet gold coin; an antique Woody Woodpecker toy; a collection of Muhammad Ali and Layla Ali memorabilia; and a 1963 Zenith Trans-Oceanic Model 3000 shortwave radio.
48	23	"Top Secret"	June 7, 2010
Items appraised include a set of maps and battle plans for the Battle of Iwo Jima; a script for the In the Heat of the Night episode "Blessings", autographed by nine of the series' stars, including Carroll O'Connor; a 1967 Ford F-100 truck that needs work; and a collection of 1860s miner's equipment found in Goldfield, Nevada, the centerpiece of which is a miner's ore cart.
49	24	"A Whale of a Time"	June 14, 2010
Items appraised include the 1953 first issue of Playboy magazine, featuring Marilyn Monroe's nude pictorial; an 1824 whale tooth scrimshaw with a logbook stamp on its bottom; two antique rifles, one of which is a .54 caliber Burnside carbine gun from the American Civil War, the other of which is a trapdoor gun; a foxhole lighter; and music manager Buddy Zoloth's address book from the 1960s, which includes phone numbers for a number of his contacts, including Keith Richards, Neil Young, Grace Slick and Elton John.
50	25	"Gold Diggers"	June 14, 2010
Items appraised include a gold bar worth about $24,000, which was found in the seller's recently deceased grandmother's house, possibly recovered from a shipwreck, which is appraised to be worth approximately $48,000; an astrodome from a B-29 Superfortress; a four-chambered liquor bottle made of hand-blown glass from France; a collection of Kentucky coal miners' scrip coins from the 1920s–1940s; and a collection of American League Baseball field passes dating from 1925 to the 1940s.
51	26	"Aw Shucks!"	June 21, 2010
Items appraised include an antique carnival Big Six wheel, which Rick and the seller spin to come to an agreement on a purchase price; a white metal coin from George Washington's funeral, with a hole drilled into it that bothers Rick, and whose apparent age worries the Old Man; a flax bow totem from a Native American craft shop in Wyoming; a copy of the early-20th-century Coca-Cola advertisement Drink Coca-Cola 5¢ featuring model Hilda Clark; and a hand-cranked corn shucker.
52	27	"Deals from Hell"	June 21, 2010
Items appraised include a 1901 kris sword from the Philippines with a talisman pommel; three 1997 photo negatives of Michael Jackson taken during his HIStory World Tour, the rights which the photographer wants to sell; a dome-top trunk from the late 19th century that was bought at a San Francisco yard sale; a copy of Dante's Inferno illustrated by Gustave Doré from the late 19th century; and a wooden duck pull toy from the 1930s that was bought at a yard sale 20 years previously by the seller's mother.
53	28	"Chumlee's Dummies"	June 28, 2010
Items appraised include a solar therapy device; a 1939 Stinson Reliant airplane; two Western Novelty dummies whose purchase by the Old Man angers Rick; a receipt of Andrew Jackson's for eight muskets from the War of 1812, and a signed and numbered print of Peter Lik's photo "Beyond Paradise".
54	29	"Strike, Spare, BOOM"	June 28, 2010
Items appraised include a bowling ball mortar built by the seller; a 1939 British World War II baby gas mask; an intact ticket for the 1965 Muhammad Ali versus Floyd Patterson fight; an antique spotlight estimated to be from the 1930s; and a collection of 70 antique railroad bonds, estimated by the seller to date from the 1840s.
55	30	"Message in a Bottle"	July 5, 2010
Items appraised include an 1850s sterling silver whisky flask that houses a note indicating it belonged to a Confederate banker; The Who's Woodstock contract, signed by Michael Lang, which was bought at a yard sale; a 110-year-old Old Faithful hand-cranked pine washing machine; two 19th-century Liverpool-made Williams & Powell duelling pistols estimated to be from the 1850s, whose missing proof marks worry the Old Man; and a framed set of two 1948 World Series Cleveland Indians pennants.
56	31	"Rough Riders"	July 5, 2010
Items appraised include a broken Remington six-shot revolver that is fourth in a series of four, of which Teddy Roosevelt owned two, whose seller claims belonged to an ancestor general in the Honduran Army that rode with Roosevelt; a 1937 John Deere Model A tractor; 12 frosted glass Disney figurines said to be made for a Disney park in Italy that never opened; a Romstar "Jump Shot" basketball arcade game; an 1850s British-style bugle bought at an estate sale that appears to have belonged to the 7th Cavalry, Company A; and a Bulova Accutron Spaceview Movement gift clock, given to Israel Foreign Minister Yigal Allon by Richard Nixon, whose seller is Allon's grandson.
57	32	"Phoning It In"	July 12, 2010
Items appraised include three personal letters by John, Robert and Edward Kennedy to the seller's aunt; a Coca-Cola airline ice chest dating from 1948 to 1952; a copy of Alice's Adventures in Wonderland illustrated by Salvador Dalí; a collection of over 1,000 Transformers toys; five vintage Mickey Mouse rotary telephones; and an 85-year-old antique razor made in Solingen, Germany that was bought at an estate sale, whose ivory handle turns out to be made of celluloid.
58	33	"Moon Walking"	July 12, 2010
Items appraised include a framed Apollo 16 mission flag autographed by all three mission astronauts; an 1861 American Civil War .58 caliber Colt Special rifle musket that was won by the seller in a poker game against his uncle; a gumball machine styled as a chicken that lays eggs; two pieces of Li'l Abner and Dick Tracy original comic strip art signed by creators Al Capp and Chester Gould, whose seller was an employee of the New York Daily News art department in the 1960s; and a collection of 20 NFL collector pins from the first 20 Super Bowls made by Coca-Cola, that was found in the garage of the seller's recently-deceased uncle.

=== Season 3 (2010–11) ===
No. overall	No. in season	Title	Original release date
59	1	"Peeping Pawn"	August 16, 2010
Items appraised include a World War II impact detonation grenade made by Eastman Kodak for the Office of Strategic Services, which was bought for $5 by a part-time employee of the store; a late 1950s "School for Young Ladies" peep show machine; a 1958 Harley-Davidson toy motorcycle made by Masudaya Modern Toys, whose seller's mother needs money for eye surgery; a Select-O-Vend penny candy machine estimated to be from the 1940s or 1950s; a rare, 1776 Massachusetts Pine Tree Cent penny made by Paul Revere, whose seller says is one of only two in existence; and a collection of John F. Kennedy memorabilia whose pieces are in varied condition.
60	2	"Ace in the Hole"	August 16, 2010
Items appraised include three 1896 Educational Series silver certificates purchased at an auction for $7,500; a collection of July 1898 photos taken at Camp Cuba Libra outside Jacksonville, Florida, which includes a shot of General Robert E. Lee's nephew, Major General Fitzhugh Lee, Commander of the 7th Army Corps, purchased 20 years previously by the seller at an estate sale; a late-19th-century professional gambler's toolkit, also purchased 20 years previously, which belonged to gambler J.D. Borthwick, and includes a set of weapons in the bottom compartment, including a Colt Model 1862 revolver and a Joseph Allen & Sons bowie knife; a 1950s Oremaster Long-Ranger Geiger counter; and an early-20th-century Wee Wheelers kick scooter purchased at an estate sale.
61	3	"Double Trouble"	September 6, 2010
Items appraised include an 1830s–1850s .34 caliber, double-barreled rifle with both a smooth and a rifled barrel, brought to the shop along with an 1840s, possibly .42 caliber percussion pistol; proofs of two paintings by Andy Warhol protégé Steve Kaufman, whose ripped edges concern Rick; a 1930s four-string acoustic Martin guitar brought in by singer Jeremy McKinnon of A Day to Remember; two unopened Freddy Krueger dolls signed by actor Robert Englund, who played the character; and an unopened bottle of 1921 Dom Pérignon champagne, which Rick believes was stored incorrectly, ruining its contents.
62	4	"Getting a Head"	September 6, 2010
Items appraised include a shrunken human head from the Amazon that Rick thinks is a fake; a black widow brooch that Rick identifies as Fabergé, much to the seller's surprise; a 1969 Buick Skylark in need of restoration that the seller found behind a grocery store before buying it from the owner; a U.S. Civil War field desk filled with period documents, whose seller claims to be the great, great grandson of its original owner, the captain of the 10th Indiana Volunteers, Company C; and a 1902 Queen Paula Sears pump organ.
63	5	"Cornering the Colonel"	September 13, 2010
Items appraised include a copy of the Beatles album Yesterday and Today with the infamous "Butcher Cover"; a large World War II American Garrison Flag displaying 48 stars; a pre-1900, German-made, watchmaker's screw refinishing tool that belonged to the seller's watchmaker father; the last suit given to Colonel Harlan Sanders under his contract with KFC, which was found by the seller in a house that belonged to Sanders; the commission document, signed by United States President Grover Cleveland, with which he appointed William Lochren Commissioner of Pensions; and a 1981 Zamperla "K.O. PunchBall" arcade punching bag game.
64	6	"Ready, Set, Pawn"	September 13, 2010
Items appraised include a 1970s custom-made, Super Comp drag racing car, with trailer, that needs restoration to be recertified; a 1945 Japanese Set #2 land mine training kit that belonged to the seller's veteran father; an 1883 high-wheel bicycle, whose parts the Old Man feels are far more modern than the 19th century; and a Howdy Doody paper doll Wonder Bread advertisement estimated by the Old Man to be from the 1950s. Chumlee pesters Rick to have the shop print business cards for him, though he is forced to adapt when he sees how Corey wrote his name on them.
65	7	"The Eagle Has Landed"	September 20, 2010
Items appraised include a gutted 1920 Prohibition-era antique slot machine from Colorado; a 1973 Jeep CJ5 that needs restoration; an 1861 double eagle $20 gold coin brought in by a bail bondsman whose missing client gave it to him as collateral; and a collection of photographs and positives from the Apollo 17 moon landing mission.
66	8	"Like a Rolling Chum"	September 20, 2010
Items appraised include a hockey stick signed by members of the 1980 "Miracle on Ice" United States Olympic men's hockey team; an original 1970s vinyl LP of Bob Dylan's album, Self Portrait; a 1997 Fleetwood Discovery motorhome; and a huge collection of 1950s cowboy toys that includes various memorabilia of The Lone Ranger and Bat Masterson. Rick tasks Chumlee to get the album autographed by Dylan, who is performing in town. However, Chumlee disappoints Rick with an autograph made out to the former.
67	9	"Hello Nurse"	October 18, 2010
Items appraised include a Civil War-era Kentucky long rifle; a silver plate and bowl whose seller says was stolen from Adolf Hitler's summer home by his great uncle during World War II, and which Rick immediately rejects due to the shop not accepting Nazi memorabilia; an 1899 Irish blackthorne walking stick; a 1967 G.I. Joe nurse action doll; and a 1950s-era Marketeer golf cart in poor condition. Irritated over the poor performance of the night shift, Rick assigns Corey to temporarily work the night shift to retrain the employees, much to Corey's displeasure.
68	10	"Chumdog Millionaire"	October 18, 2010
Items appraised include a 1956 Gibson guitar; a 1981 DeLorean sports car; and a letter from Franklin D. Roosevelt, sent to the seller's grandfather. Rick, Corey, and Chumlee learn they will appear on the game show Who Wants to Be a Millionaire?. Meredith Vieira makes a cameo appearance in a dream sequence experienced by Chumlee.
69	11	"Gone With the Schwinn"	October 25, 2010
Items appraised include a pair of ornate, hand-etched parade saddles; a 60-year-old Steiff teddy bear; an 18th-century bronze miniature cannon, purchased at a garage sale, that was used for instruction in the use of its larger counterparts; two 1950s Schwinn Phantom bicycles; and a collection of 58 boxes, each containing about 60 video tapes of various TV shows and movies plus audio cassettes, that belonged to entertainer Sammy Davis Jr.
70	12	"Bare Bones"	October 25, 2010
Items appraised include a collection of 290-million-year-old Mazon Creek fossils of spiders and ferns; a blackjack table from the Stardust Casino; two metal Coca-Cola signs from the 1950s; and a custom Down and Dirty motorcycle frame. When Rick and the Old Man learn that Corey paid a total of $18,000 to buy the frame and build a motorcycle from it, they give Corey, who entertains the notion of purchasing it himself, an ultimatum.
71	13	"Never Surrender"	November 1, 2010
Items appraised include a letter by Winston Churchill to U.S. Major General Mark Clark; a radio controlled, gas-powered toy Hummer that Chumlee wants to repair; an antique barber pole made between the late 19th century and the early 20th century made of cast iron and blown stained glass; a 1938 Frigidaire refrigerator; and a Catholic relic from Saint Elizabeth Seton with documentation in Latin.
72	14	"Honest Abe"	November 1, 2010
Items appraised include a silk Abraham Lincoln campaign ribbon from the 1860 U.S. Presidential election; a working 19th-century dynamite detonator; a mid-1960s three-wheeled B&Z Electra-King electric car; a pair of mint condition 1990 Air Jordan V basketball shoes, (about which Chumlee displays a surprising amount of knowledge); a pre-World War II German Tippco toy army truck; and a 1913 Victrola phonograph.
73	15	"Monkey Business"	December 6, 2010
Items appraised include a 1944 Carlisle & Finch Navy spotlight; a hat claimed to have been worn by John Wayne in either Rio Grande or Rio Lobo; a framed Rembrandt etching whose seller bought it at a garage sale for $10; a 1930s Baldwin Howard grand piano; a 1950s Musical Jolly Chimp clapping cymbal toy; and a Yankee Stadium bleacher seat whose seller claims was taken from the stadium during Game 6 of the 1977 World Series.
74	16	"Packing Heat"	December 13, 2010
Items appraised include a 1950s battery-operated bacon-cooking pig chef toy made by Yonezawa; a collection of 1990s Atlanta Braves National League championship and World Series rings; a 1962 Cadillac Fleetwood limousine; and two pistol cigarette lighters. To surprise the Old Man, Rick invites the former's favorite band, the Oak Ridge Boys, for a visit to the shop.
75	17	"Luck of the Draw"	January 17, 2011
Items appraised include two 19th-century pistols; a collection of items that belonged to American folk legend Wyatt Earp, as well as some photos of Earp and Bat Masterson; a collection of fishing lures whose seller hopes to buy a new surfboard; a Schlitz beer lamp; and a sample gold medal from the 1984 Summer Olympics in Los Angeles.
76	18	"Houdini's Handcuffs"	January 17, 2011
Items appraised include handcuffs and leg shackles that belonged to Harry Houdini; a St. Louis Rams Vince Lombardi Trophy from Super Bowl XXXIV; a collection of 1940s comic buttons from Pep Cereal; a 1970s Slingerland jazz drum set; and a Prohibition-era cocktail shaker.
77	19	"Pedal to the Medal"	January 24, 2011
Items appraised include an antique pedal car; a chessboard made of wood from the Titanic; a 1978 Superman record player; some poetry handwritten by Jimi Hendrix; and a sealed can of "Can Can" brand canned pearls that Rick wishes to open in order to inspect the contents.
78	20	"Case Closed"	January 24, 2011
Items appraised include a 17th-century musketoon; a 1974 Lotus Europa sports car; a case file from the Lindbergh baby kidnapping that belonged to Leon Hoage, a private investigator hired by Charles Lindbergh; and a mid-1970s Lasonic boom box.
79	21	"Darth Pawn"	January 31, 2011
Items appraised include a 1930s Bendix A7 World War II aircraft octant; a 1995 Nintendo Virtual Boy video game console; an 1880s doctor's buggy whose seller purchased on the Internet; life-size Star Wars figures of Jar Jar Binks and Darth Maul; and a 1763 Stradivarius violin whose seller says was found in a cedar chest in his newly-purchased house, but which Rick thinks is a copy.
80	22	"Put Up Your Dukes"	January 31, 2011
Items appraised include a book published in 1546 by Georgius Agricola that was once owned by Isaac Newton; a U.S. Army coat from the Spanish–American War whose seller claims belonged to his grandfather (much to the Harrisons' skepticism); a 1980s Capehart cell phone; and a 32-year-old, 80-piece collection of John Wayne memorabilia. After buying the Newton book, Rick notices some annotations written in it that may be Newton's actual handwriting.
81	23	"Pawn Illustrated"	February 7, 2011
Items appraised include a collection of World War II aviator gear, including a P-38 flight jacket, hat, and survival kit; an unopened 48-year-old canister of National Biscuit Company fallout shelter survival crackers; a half-scale flintlock musket dated to the 1770s–1780s; three Sahara Casino baccarat chips; and a collection of first-three-seasons issues of Sports Illustrated.
82	24	"Striking a Chord"	February 7, 2011
Items appraised include a First Acts of Congress book signed by James Smith that was discovered in an old house; a Breitling emergency watch; an A-series 1907 Gibson mandolin Rick thinks might have been made by Lloyd Loar; a 1973 Airstream trailer; and a 1983 RB Robotics 5X home robot that was purchased at a flea market.
83	25	"Harrison for President"	February 14, 2011
Items appraised include an antique Pepsi cooler circa 1939–50 that needs full restoration; a functional antique Mutoscope arcade claw machine; a political textile sporting the likeness of someone Rick thinks might be William Henry Harrison, but who turns out to be Gilbert du Motier, Marquis de Lafayette; a sealed box of 1940s pre-embargo Cuban cigars found by the seller in his father's old war chest; and a picture book from the 1936 Summer Olympics, along with one of the gold medallions that was given to German soldiers at the time.
84	26	"Wise Guys"	February 14, 2011
Items appraised include a 1941 armored M3 Scout Car; a check signed by mobster Carlo Gambino; a 1988 Apple IIGS computer; an 1880 Newfoundland 2 dollar coin and a 1937 Little Orphan Annie decoder pin.
85	27	"Robosaurus"	March 21, 2011
Items appraised include an 1886 cast-iron Uncle Sam mechanical coin bank; the fire-breathing Robosaurus monster truck; a $1 fold-over error note from the 1960s; and an antique Hohner harmonica. When the shop's computer system crashes, the Old Man becomes irate with Corey's inability to hand-write receipts.
86	28	"Ah, Shoot!"	March 21, 2011
Items appraised include an Ansel Adams print; a 1987 Jaguar XJ6 car that the Old Man takes a liking to; a 1942 Chicago Bears football autographed by the entire team; a copy of the November 3, 1948 edition of the Chicago Tribune, which featured the infamous "Dewey Defeats Truman" headline; and two 1934 $500 and $1,000 notes.
87	29	"Going Postal"	March 28, 2011
Items appraised include an 1861 U.S. postage printing plate for a George Washington 24 cent stamp; a recalled poster for the 1983 film Star Wars: Return of the Jedi; a 1960s Alvin marionette; an LP record album of a March 16, 1968 speech by Dr. Martin Luther King Jr., made less than three weeks before his assassination; and a Sioux Indian youth vest, which Rick makes a big mistake in purchasing for $1,300 without authenticating it beforehand.
88	30	"Chummobile"	March 28, 2011
Items appraised include a writing desk that incorporates a gun, which appears to be from the 1890s–1910s; a replica of the Batmobile from the 1989 Batman film; an antique American warship's passport document featuring an Edward Savage engraving and signed by Thomas Jefferson and James Madison; and a collection of signed memorabilia of pool champion Willie Mosconi.

=== Season 4 (2011) ===
No. overall	No. in season	Title	Original release date
89	1	"Evel Genius"	April 4, 2011
Items appraised include a collection of 1960s rock concert posters for Buffalo Springfield, the Grateful Dead, and the Rolling Stones; an optometrist's collection of 400 hand-blown glass prosthetic eyeballs dating from the 1890s – 1939; a 1977 Evel Knievel pinball machine that turns out to be worth much less than what Corey paid for it; and an autographed photo of Babe Ruth.
90	2	"Pablo Pawncasso"	April 4, 2011
Items appraised include a copy of the first issue of Rolling Stone magazine; a pair of 2002 and 2008 gold-plated pants pendants awarded to Ohio State football players, the latter of which belonged to Washington Redskins defensive tackle Doug Worthington; two Pablo Picasso lithographs; a 1931 REO Flying Cloud hot rod with bulletproof glass; and a 1980s coin-operated, computerized breathalyzer formerly used in a California bar.
91	3	"Sub for Sale"	April 11, 2011
Items appraised include an officer's commission from the Revolutionary War; a vintage miniature Model T Ford car with a working motor; an antique spittoon from the Goldfield Hotel; an R2-D2 cooler; and a one-man midget submarine, whose purchase by Rick surprises both the Old Man and Corey.
92	4	"Missile Attack"	April 11, 2011
Items appraised include the guidance system to a Cold War–era AIM-9 Sidewinder missile; an original Playboy Bunny outfit; a 1986 Buick Regal car that Chumlee takes an odd liking to; an 1850s–1860s carpenter's tool chest; and a 1980s Rubik's Cube sealed in its original package.
93	5	"Not On My Watch"	April 18, 2011
Items appraised include a Confederate Civil War Bowie knife known as an "Arkansas Toothpick"; a 1970 Honda Z600; a professionally restored, 1936 Rolex watch previously owned by fraudster Bernie Madoff; a boxing gym bell signed by boxer Sonny Liston in 1970; and a 1957 Team Bowling Alley arcade game.
94	6	"Take a Seat"	April 18, 2011
Items appraised include a chair from the U.S. Senate that belonged to Senator Pat McCarran; a photograph of a NASA Gemini spacecraft launch signed by numerous astronauts including Neil Armstrong, Ed White, Buzz Aldrin, and Gus Grissom; a NASCAR driver's suit, c. 2002–03, that once belonged to Ryan Newman; and a collection of Asian wood carvings. To address the Old Man's habit of falling asleep within view of the showroom floor, Rick has a new office built for him.
95	7	"Pom Pom Pawn"	April 25, 2011
Items appraised include a naval blunderbuss from the 17th century, a 1978 GMC motorhome sponsored by Coca-Cola; a copy of talent agent John Robert Powers' 1954 book, Secrets of Charm; a San Francisco 49ers cheerleader's Super Bowl XXIV ring; a photo of The Who signed by three of that band's members; and a Columbia University speed reading machine course.
96	8	"Patton Pending"	April 25, 2011
Items appraised include a signed General George S. Patton photo album, whose seller is the grandson of the lieutenant assigned to photograph Patton for three months; an antique sterling silver travel kit; a pair of jockey boots autographed by jockey Bill Shoemaker; a large collection of decanters; and a Kevlar bulletproof vest with two trauma plates.
97	9	"Spidey Cents"	May 2, 2011
Items appraised include a piece of the heat shield from the Apollo 13 spacecraft; a 1973 Husqvarna CR 400 dirt bike whose restoration may prove to be a problem for Corey; a World War II Japanese non-commissioned officer's sword; Todd McFarlane's original artwork for page 25 of The Amazing Spider-Man #316 (June 1989); and a Curta calculator from the 1950s or 1960s.
98	10	"Necessary Roughness"	May 2, 2011
Items appraised include a collection of battle plans from the Normandy landings of World War II; an antique leather football helmet; a two saber bayonets from the Franco-Prussian War; and the head of a 1978 Stretch Serpent toy, which Corey buys for $500, leading to a bet between him and an irritated Old Man over how much it is really worth.
99	11	"Peacemaker"	May 9, 2011
Items appraised include an early 1890s Colt .45 Peacemaker; a mid-1950s German Binz scooter; photos of a Japanese World War II Mitsubishi A6M Zero fighter plane shot down in the Aleutian Islands on July 10, 1942; a Tiger's eye gemstone skull; and Elvis Presley's medical records.
100	12	"The Great Escape"	May 9, 2011
Items appraised include an original Harry Houdini straitjacket authenticated to have been used by him in a January 1, 1915 performance, whose seller says his grandfather was friends with Houdini's brother, Theodore Hardeen; a loudspeaker from Ebbets Field in Brooklyn, which the Old Man starts fooling around with, to the annoyance of the staff and customers; a framed letter written and signed by Helen Keller, along with a photo of her; and a Carl Zeiss telescope from the late 19th century.
101	13	"Broadsiding Lincoln"	May 30, 2011
Items appraised include a framed John Wilkes Booth wanted poster printed on April 20, 1865; a 1930s arcade penny scale; an Air Force fighter pilot's G-suit and helmet worn by the seller's brother-in-law when he flew an F-18 during the Gulf War; and a 1930s Chicago police badge. Rick's friend, Dana, brings in a genuine copy of the Booth wanted poster to compare it with the poster being appraised, which turns out to be a reproduction; however, soon after, Rick offers to buy the genuine poster from Dana, whose bottom line is at $150,000, a price that Rick is not willing to pay.
102	14	"Sharpe Shooters"	June 1, 2011
Rick and Sean Rich travel to Ashman's Pioneer Market in Fillmore, Utah to appraise a Civil War-era Gatling gun that just came on the market, as well as an 1863 Sharps carbine. Back in Las Vegas, items appraised at the Gold & Silver include a 1915 Ford Model T taxi and a vintage Charley Weaver Bartender toy.
103	15	"Late Night Chum"	June 6, 2011
Items appraised include World War II Adolf Hitler novelty matches; a Union Civil War cavalry jacket; an autographed limited edition copy of Will Rogers' The Illiterate Digest; a 1940s porcelain Texaco sign; and an original Teddy Ruxpin and Grubby set. Rick assigns Chumlee to the night shift to fill in for someone who is sick, much to Chumlee's chagrin.
104	16	"Buy the Book"	June 6, 2011
Items appraised include a Confederate "CS" belt buckle with a Minié ball bullet lodged in it; a first edition copy of Ernest Hemingway's For Whom the Bell Tolls, along with a framed autograph of the author; a 1932 V12 Lincoln Roadster, whose seller is initially reluctant to negotiate; and an antique bamboo fishing pole. The autograph turns out to be a forgery, but Rick buys the book for $500; he later sells it to journalist George Stephanopoulos for $675.
105	17	"Over the Top"	June 13, 2011
Items appraised include a quick-draw gun holster and blank-firing gun used on the TV series Gunsmoke in 1957 and 1958; a 1930s Steelcraft zeppelin pull toy; a World War I 5th Marine Regiment helmet; and an antique clock with four Morgan silver dollars and two Peace Dollars embedded in it. Rick hires a personal trainer and insists that he, Corey, the Old Man, and Chumlee begin exercising every morning.
106	18	"Honor Thy Father"	June 13, 2011
Items appraised include a framed document signed by John Hancock with which he was inducted as a captain in the American militia; a framed limited print photo of Jimi Hendrix taken by Gered Mankowitz that Corey buys for $2,000 as a Father's Day gift for Rick; a 1934 steel Rickenbacker frying pan guitar; and a 1960s Schwinn Sting-Ray Runabout that's been outfitted with a motor that Corey says needs to be removed in order for it to be sold as a collectible.
107	19	"The Pick, the Pawn, and the Polish"	July 11, 2011
The conclusion of a three-part crossover episode that began on American Pickers and continued on American Restoration. Rick asks Mike Wolfe and Frank Fritz to find a 1957 Chevrolet for his father's 70th birthday, and then meets with Rick Dale and Danny Koker to have it restored in time for the party. At Gold & Silver, items appraised include a 19th-century Imperial Protector 4 mm gun ring; an antique binnacle; a collection of approximately 50 original animation cels and their color guides that include Scooby-Doo, Fat Albert, The Smurfs, and Looney Tunes; and a framed unused ticket for a 1966 Beatles concert at Shea Stadium.
108	20	"Making Cents"	July 18, 2011
Items appraised include a script of The Godfather autographed by Al Pacino; a sterling silver Cartier bottle opener and a pair of caps; a vintage Excelsior accordion; a World War II Celestial navigation trainer book; and a 1950s coin-operated Bally "Western Express" kiddie ride that Chumlee, working on a $1,000 spending limit from Rick, appraises and buys on his own in an attempt to prove himself.
109	21	"Kings and McQueens"	July 18, 2011
Items appraised include a 19th-century shotgun disguised as a cane; a 1940 Indian motorcycle that belonged to racer Steve McQueen; a 1745 book printed by Benjamin Franklin; a 19th-century Lebenswecker; and a William Young & Sons surveying instrument.
110	22	"Face the Music"	July 25, 2011
Items appraised include a framed business card of Old West outlaw John Wesley Hardin, authentication of which proves to be difficult; a 1950s Shopsmith woodworking machine; a jacket worn by actor Clint Walker in the 1964 movie Send Me No Flowers, which the seller says he purchased from Walker personally, along with three autographed photos of him wearing it; and an early 1930s Gibson mandolin that an ambitious Chumlee buys for $1,500 without authenticating it beforehand, which turns out to be a big mistake, as the mandolin turns out to be a modern reproduction. Chumlee attempts to pay Rick back by busking in front of the shop with the mandolin.
111	23	"Off the Wall"	July 25, 2011
Items appraised include an 1854 Civil War rifle made in Harpers Ferry that Rick observes is loaded; a replica Master Chief armor suit and rifle based on the video game Halo that was made by the seller; a 1950s Murray atomic missile pedal car; two liberty passes from the USS Arizona and USS Mississippi; and four vintage pawn shop movie posters that Rick wants to keep to decorate the shop, so he sends Corey and Chumlee to get the posters framed. However, Corey sells one of the posters to the framer for $1,500 (the price Rick paid for all four), and Rick orders him to get the poster back, during which the Old Man sells another poster, also for $1,500.
112	24	"Buffalo Bull"	August 1, 2011
Items appraised include a chest filled with puppets and other memorabilia belonging to Buffalo Ben, who may have been a member of Buffalo Bill's Wild West Show; a phone booth from the 1950s or 1960s whose phone still functions; three vintage railroad lamps; and an unsigned copy of Ronald Reagan's 1928 high school yearbook and a signed letter that belonged to the seller's grandfather, who graduated with Reagan.
113	25	"Cannons and Klingons"	August 1, 2011
Items appraised include a military lighter, ID, and scrapbook that belonged to the seller's grandfather, a writer/producer who made propaganda films for the U.S. government's atomic testing program in the 1950s; a framed shirt that belonged to actor Roy Rogers; a collection of 200 pieces of signed Star Trek memorabilia; and an antique signal cannon used by Jonathan Higgins (John Hillerman) on the TV series Magnum, P.I..
114	26	"Silent and Deadly"	August 8, 2011
Items appraised include a piece of marble from Abraham Lincoln's tomb; a Schuco Charlie Chaplin wind-up doll; a 1970 Chevrolet Impala car; an antique African sword from the Congo; and a limited edition copy of The Authorized Al, a biography of "Weird Al" Yankovic.
115	27	"Weird Science"	August 8, 2011
Rick and Sean Rich return to Ashman's Pioneer Market in Utah to appraise a 19th-century five-barrel 37 mm Hotchkiss revolving cannon that fires one-pound projectiles. Back at Gold & Silver, items appraised include an antique Master Violet Ray #11 electrotherapy kit; a 1973 Wurlitzer jukebox; a 50-year-old electric waffle iron; and an unused hog oiler.
116	28	"The Wright Stuff"	August 15, 2011
Items appraised include a collection of letters and pilot licenses signed by Orville Wright; a 1930s Jennings Bronze Chief nickel slot machine; and a Model 1830 percussion musket from West Point Military Academy.
117	29	"Out of Gas"	August 15, 2011
Items appraised include a 19th-century W. Child percussion dueling pistol; a hat once owned by Ronnie Van Zant of Lynyrd Skynyrd, who gave it to the seller in 1977; a first edition copy of Charles Dickens' David Copperfield; a 2000 Porsche Carrera 911 car engine; and a vintage rotary dial pay phone that's been converted for home use.
118	30	"The King's Bling"	September 5, 2011
Items appraised include a collection of over 200 vintage Matchbox cars; two World War I German Pickelhaube helmets; a framed blood chit from World War II; three Japanese arcade games (Dig Dug, Yie-Ar Kung Fu and Super Dodgeball); and a gold necklace owned by Elvis Presley that was given to the seller when she was a teenager.
119	31	"Pipe Dreams"	September 5, 2011
Items appraised include Robert E. Lee's silver spoon and Ulysses S. Grant's meerschaum pipe, which are both framed and brought in by the same seller; four volumes of Miguel de Cervantes' Don Quixote; a vintage Metrotech metal detector; a U.S. Vietnam War-era practice bomb; and one of Secretariat's horseshoes.
120	32	"High Stakes"	September 12, 2011
Items appraised include an 1830s Nock percussion pistol; a 1958 Glastron Seaflight boat; a copy of Dracula signed by Bram Stoker that was purchased at a charity auction; a Penn State University 1973 Orange Bowl championship ring, which Rick rejects after noticing that the engraving is scratched off, making the ring illegal to sell; and a collection of antique billiard items, including ivory billiard balls.
121	33	"Pirate's Booty"	September 12, 2011
Items appraised include a 1787 Swedish carriage strongbox; a pirate ship parade float that Chumlee appraises; a collection of one-ounce silver art bars from the early 1970s; a World War II bomber jacket and flight mission logs that belonged to the seller's father, a B-17 pilot; and two Native American Kachina figurines made of sterling silver and turquoise.
122	34	"Teacher's Pet"	September 19, 2011
Items appraised include a World War II Sperry bombsight purchased at a garage sale for $10, which turns out to be not a bombsight, but instead a compensating mechanism from a B-26 or B-24 turret; a 1930s Dow Jones stock ticker; two 1903 volumes of Charles Paul de Kock's Le Barbier de Paris, hand-written and illustrated by John French Sloan on vellum; and an antique toy car appraised by the shop's security guard, Antwaun, after he asks Chumlee to teach him more about the pawn business.
123	35	"Bugs Money"	September 19, 2011
Items appraised include a golf putter owned by Dean Martin, who was the seller's father-in-law; a 1941 741 Indian motorcycle; a homemade suit of armor; a tin Louis Armstrong toy; and a framed Bugs Bunny 50th anniversary poster signed by Mel Blanc and Friz Freleng.
124	36	"Security"	September 26, 2011
Items appraised include a Civil War drum; a 1922 photographer's printing table; a framed 1946 Royal Riders motorcycle club uniform; and a 1652 sixpence coin. Antwaun, in preparation to take a few days off, attempts to train Chumlee on how to work the door in his absence, which Chumlee, unsurprisingly, does not take seriously.
125	37	"Poker Night"	September 26, 2011
Items appraised include a 1956 Winter Olympics competitor's stadium coat; a 1940s pinup poster; an 1861 gambling set; and an unopened 2002 Snoop Dogg doll, which Chumlee buys for himself for $100. The Old Man challenges the others to a game of poker.
126	38	"Rick or Treat"	October 24, 2011
Items appraised in this Halloween-themed episode include a 19th-century vampire-killing kit; a collection of equipment used in paranormal investigations that includes several tape recorders, a full spectrum camera and a laser grid, whose sellers offer to use to search for paranormal activity around the shop; a 1940s keypunch machine whose seller was a punchcard accounting instructor in the early 1950s; and a 1983 Jabba the Hutt Play-Doh set. Also, Rick orders the entire staff to come in on Halloween in costume, with the best costume awarded $100 of in-store credit.

=== Season 5 (2011–12) ===
No. overall	No. in season	Title	Original release date
127	1	"Mile High Club"	November 28, 2011
Items appraised include an Aero L-39 Albatros Soviet fighter jet; a baseball glove signed by Babe Ruth and a bat signed by Ruth and Christy Mathewson; a set of 19th-century George Ligowsky glass target balls; and a 1940s Hanovia tanning lamp.
128	2	"Patriot Games"	November 28, 2011
Items appraised include a framed poster from the movie Bullitt signed by Steve McQueen, Robert Duvall, Jacqueline Bisset and Robert Vaughn; two Civil War diaries from 1864 and 1865 that belonged to Hiram Otis Warren, a captain in the Union Army, 123rd New York Infantry, who was present at Gettysburg, Chancellorsville and Sherman's March, which are brought in by Warren's great-great-grandson; and New England Patriots wide receiver Ricky Bryant's Super Bowl XXXIX Championship ring, whose hand-engraved manufacturer's mark worries Rick. Rick decides to implement a new rule forbidding staff from keeping items purchased for the shop, but Corey and the Old Man are skeptical of Rick's own commitment to this idea.
129	3	"Blaze of Glory"	December 5, 2011
Items appraised include a torch from the 1984 Summer Olympics, brought in by the man who ran with it when he was 17; an early-20th-century Austrian miniature pinfire pistol; a 1937 Oldsmobile L-37 four-door sedan with suicide doors; and a life-size Mario statue.
130	4	"Looney Dunes"	December 5, 2011
Items appraised include a five-speed custom sand rail, which was awarded to the seller in her divorce; a 1930s Levi's jacket; a collection of unpublished photos of Jimi Hendrix presented by Ron Raffaelli, the Hendrix photographer who took them and kept them in his archives for 40 years; and a 2011 Polaris Razor XP 900 dune buggy. Rick and Corey take the two purchased off-road vehicles to the desert to see which one of them made the better deal.
131	5	"Buyer Beware"	December 12, 2011
Items appraised include a prop policeman's badge from the TV show Dragnet; a vintage steel mandolin; a post-Civil War Grand Army of the Republic parade cannon; and a signed Abraham Lincoln print.
132	6	"Silence of the Lambo"	December 12, 2011
Items appraised include a certified set of Saddam Hussein's fingerprints taken after his 2003 capture and arrest; an Olympic drug test pin brought in by the cyclist to whom it was given; a 2003 Lamborghini Murciélago car purchased at an IRS auction; a 19th-century solid brass duck press; and a sterling silver Tiffany Walkman radio originally owned by John Entwistle, which is brought in by his ex-wife, Maxene.
133	7	"$=MC2"	December 19, 2011
Items appraised include a collection of Foreign Broadcast Information Service (Note: The papers are repeatedly referred to as "Pentagon" papers in the episode, however the cover of the top booklet reads "FBIS Reports 1–31 August 1972". The Foreign Broadcast Information Service is part of the Central Intelligence Agency, and not the Pentagon.) daily impact reports from 1972 to early 1973; a World War II-era handheld Japanese air raid siren; and a limited edition photograph of Albert Einstein by Philippe Halsman that appeared on the cover of Time magazine. After Chumlee annoys everyone with the siren, the Old Man decides to take a tour of a World War II-era Boeing B-17 Flying Fortress, but is dismayed when he has to take Chumlee along.
134	8	"Pony Up"	December 19, 2011
Items appraised include a collection of items that belonged to former Attorney General J. Howard McGrath, including his Secret Service credentials, letters from J. Edgar Hoover and Hubert Humphrey, and a counterfeit $10 bill; a soundwagon record player; a 1979 Mattel Electronics electronic horse race analyzer, which Rick buys for $11 and gifts to the Old Man, as betting on horse racing is one of his hobbies; and a 1962 M422A1 Mighty Mite jeep.
135	9	"High Tops"	December 26, 2011
Items appraised include Nikola Tesla's original 1887 prototype AC motor; a pair of limited edition Nike Mag sneakers from the film Back to the Future Part II, a 1968 Volkswagen Beetle convertible; a 1920s salesman sample icebox; and a Breguet Lamborghini Diablo dash clock.
136	10	"Apocalypse Wow"	December 26, 2011
Items appraised include a framed print of Albrecht Dürer's engraving Knight, Death and the Devil; a nightlight statue of Bud Light advertising icon Spuds MacKenzie; a 2005 customized trike outfitted with built-in speakers, a video screen and a Mack Truck horn; a pre-Civil War daguerreotype studio camera; and a 2001 Boss Hoss trike.
137	11	"Corey's Big Play"	January 2, 2012
Items appraised include a Wells Fargo strongbox with a ball-and-chain, whose seller says is from Folsom Prison c. the late 19th century or early 20th century; a 1924 Dodge Brothers business sedan; a Terminator skill stop slot machine from Japan; and a 70-pound pair of World War II-era Nikon Coastwatcher binoculars taken from Guam in 1944.
138	12	"Help Wanted"	January 2, 2012
Items appraised include a triple-barreled, 1891 Sauer & Sohn drilling combination gun consisting of a 16-gauge double-barreled shotgun and a 9.3 mm rifle, whose seller says was taken from Germany by his grandfather during World War II; a contemporary InSTEP police pedal car; a collection of reproduction cast iron piggy banks ("Artillery", "Speaking Dog", "Teddy and the Bear", and "William Tell"); and a 1930s Dunhill clock cigarette lighter. With business picking up during the night shift, Rick decides to hire a new night employee to help Charles, who is adept at dealing with jewelry, but not with antiques.
139	13	"Learning the Ropes"	January 9, 2012
Items appraised include a 1910 Springfield, Illinois banker's time lock; an 1873 Springfield Armory single-shot rope gun; a first edition copy of Henry David Thoreau's Walden; an early 1930s optometry kit that belonged to the seller's great-grandfather; and an unopened Buzz Aldrin G.I. Joe doll. Also, Corey and Chumlee conduct interviews in order to select the shop's new night shift broker.
140	14	"Smells Like Pawn Spirit"	January 9, 2012
Items appraised include a 1928 Charles Lindbergh aviation doll, which Rick buys for $500 and later sells to his friend Johnny for $800; a vintage heavy porcelain over cast iron electric hand dryer; a Piccadilly Circus roulette slot machine; a 1980s Brother word processor; and a framed 1905 poster for a vaudeville act.
141	15	"Crosby, Stills and Cash"	January 16, 2012
Items appraised include a backpacker Martin guitar signed by Crosby, Stills and Nash that was won by the seller in a trivia radio contest; a customized Phat Cycles Fuller chopper; a collection of vintage cigar box labels, some of which featured lithographic images of U.S. Presidents; and two World War II bomb fins. Also, Rick and the Old Man interview Corey and Chumlee's favorite applicants for the night shift job from "Learning the Ropes".
142	16	"Cash Cash Bang Bang"	January 16, 2012
Items appraised include a Colt Army Model 1860 percussion revolver; a copy of The Amazing Spider-Man #1 from March 1963; three Red Comet fire extinguishers; and an 1876 Goodman Gold & Silver Mining Co. stock certificate issued to Mark Twain.
143	17	"Over the Moon"	January 23, 2012
Items appraised include a piece of Apollo 11's heat shield; a World War II cargo pilot's jacket worn as part of The Hump route; a restored 1940s O'Keefe & Merritt gas stove with chrome finishes that are styled to look like a classic car; a "Fat Man" steering wheel; a signed copy of J. Edgar Hoover's Persons in Hiding, whose seller acquired it from her great uncle, an FBI agent who worked under Hoover; and two of Gerald Ford's belt buckles.
144	18	"Les is More"	January 23, 2012
Items appraised include a 1961 Les Paul SG guitar and collection of documents that belonged to Paul's wife, Mary Ford, which are brought in by Paul's nephew; a handkerchief from Benjamin Harrison's 1892 Presidential inauguration; a Hedman Co. check fraud protection kit; and a gold Rolex watch. Also, Chumlee begins training Olivia, the new night shift employee.
145	19	"Hole in One"	January 30, 2012
Items appraised include an 1833 Whitney percussion musket converted from a flintlock; five 1960s RuddSpeed whiskey decanters modeled after the grilles of automobiles including Bentley, Bugatti, Mercedes and Rolls-Royce; a golf ball once used by Lyndon B. Johnson, which struck the father of the seller who brings it in; a 1929 World Series Chicago Cubs press pin; and a framed copy of Nicolas Sanson's 1632 map of France.
146	20	"Yankee Panky"	January 30, 2012
Items appraised include a poster for Jimi Hendrix's second-to-last concert; a collection of inflatable paintball bunkers; an autographed Paul Newman racing suit; an electronic 1940s Louis Marx and Company Mot-O-Run tin toy that was found in a dumpster; and a photo signed by Mickey Mantle, Willie Mays and Harmon Killebrew. Also, Rick and the Old Man make a bet on which of their favored items is worth more.
147	21	"Air Mail"	February 6, 2012
Items appraised include a framed 1928 letter flown by Charles Lindbergh on the Spirit of St. Louis; a collection of 1970s minibikes, one of which is a Honda Z50; a vintage horse race gambling game; a 1772 fusee pocket watch made in London; and a 1915–20 Spalding "Black Betsy" baseball bat modeled after the one used by Shoeless Joe Jackson.
148	22	"Cash is King"	February 6, 2012
Items appraised include two memoirs signed by King Edward VIII and Wallis Simpson; a 1961 NFL Championship Game program; a 1970s Sun car tune-up tester; and five 1950s stamped tin toy army vehicles made in Japan.
149	23	"Bear-ly There"	February 13, 2012
Items appraised include a Volcanic Arms pistol; a World War II United States Navy gas mask; a framed letter from by James A. Garfield prior to his presidency to a resident of the same hometown as the seller; a life-size stuffed bear made by the Steiff Company, the originator of the teddy bear; and packets of NASA tomato seeds flown by the Space Shuttle Challenger to the Long Duration Exposure Facility in orbit in 1984 and returned to Earth in 1990 on the Space Shuttle Columbia.
150	24	"Huddle Up"	February 13, 2012
Items appraised include a reel of film of Franklin Delano Roosevelt; a 1913 New York City Fire Department logbook; a collection of 1966 Miami Dolphins playbooks; and a 1923 National cash register.
151	25	"Pawnocchio"	February 20, 2012
Items appraised include three Pinocchio marionettes handcrafted by Bob Baker Marionettes; a collection of 1945 issues of Yank magazine; an early-20th-century C.M. Sorensen Co. manual blood transfusion kit; a battered 1909 Cy Young baseball card that is missing a corner; and a Blues Harp harmonica said to have been played by Steven Tyler during his rendition of "The Star-Spangled Banner" at the 2001 Indianapolis 500.
152	26	"Guns Blazing"	February 20, 2012
Items appraised include a Civil War-era Confederate LeMat combination .42 caliber nine shot revolver/20-gauge shotgun; a framed original poster for the 1965 Italian film War of the Zombies; a collection of 1980s Nintendo Game & Watch handheld games; a Dad's Root Beer outdoor thermometer sign from the late 1950s or early 1960s; and an autographed Goodyear tire from one of Dale Earnhardt's cars that was purchased from a memorabilia store as a gift for the seller, and later signed by Earnhardt following his 1998 Daytona 500 victory.
153	27	"James Gang Rides Again"	February 27, 2012
Items appraised include a collection of original tintype photos of whom the seller says is the outlaw Jesse James and his gang; a 1950s Model 145 Leslie organ speaker; a 19th-century spoon bit drill set; and a 1930s Boy Scouts of America first aid kit.
154	28	"Ring Around a Rockne"	February 27, 2012
Items appraised include a framed letter from Knute Rockne to the seller's grandfather, dated March 13, 1931, 18 days before Rockne's death; a collection of vintage Cracker Jack tin toys; an antique heirloom ring that belonged to mobster Lucky Luciano, brought in buy the son of a woman who ran errands for the mob; a 19th-century wooden dentist's pole; and a 1954 De Luxe scintillator.
155	29	"Pawn With the Wind"	March 5, 2012
Items appraised include a short snorter $1 bill signed by Clark Gable, brought in by a woman who says her uncle flew with Gable in World War II; an antique hand-crank electricity generator; a 19th-century Wells Fargo double-barrel shotgun; and a souvenir card from Ulysses S. Grant's funeral.
156	30	"Zoodoo"	March 5, 2012
Items appraised include copies of Harry S. Truman's two-volume memoir and his book, Mr. Citizen, autographed by Truman to his Chief Economist, Leon Keyserling; a novelty can of elephant manure from the Washington Park Zoo, which Chumlee buys for $20 and uses to start a prank war between him, Rick, Corey, and the Old Man; a toy robot that is an imitation Robby the Robot from the 1956 film Forbidden Planet; and a 1950s Minox spy camera from Germany, which Corey immediately rejects after finding the serial number scratched off, as well as a Social Security number engraved on the camera, therefore making it illegal to sell.

=== Season 6 (2012) ===
No. overall	No. in season	Title	Original release date
157	1	"Guilty as Charged"	April 9, 2012
Items appraised include a Star Trek Klingon bat'leth sword; a late 1700s R. Clarke over/under flintlock four-barrel handgun; a 1930s Chicago police callbox; and a 1971 book of misprinted Dwight D. Eisenhower postage stamps. Also, Rick finds a broken 200-year-old vase in the warehouse, and must investigate when no one claims responsibility. He later discovers that Chumlee broke the vase with the Klingon sword, which Corey purchased for $110.
158	2	"Corey's Big Burn"	April 9, 2012
Items appraised include an exploding dye pack of $10 bills; a burnt copy of the 1932 NFL Playoff Game program, whose $2,750 purchase by Corey concerns Rick and the Old Man; a 1952 Schwinn tandem bicycle; and a lithograph by Evel Knievel that features a sketch of a train jump on its reverse side.
159	3	"Wild Thing"	April 16, 2012
Items appraised include a 1974 Volkswagen Thing car; three Civil War-era cannonballs; a 1942 AT-6 Texan fighter plane; and a World War II-era book of war rations.
160	4	"To the Moon"	April 16, 2012
Items appraised include Jackie Gleason's custom-ordered, 1978 Lincoln Continental limousine; a Mount Rushmore commemorative plaque made of pure silver, which the Old Man wishes to melt down for fast money, but which Rick thinks will sell for more intact; a 1967 Super Bowl I football signed by the victorious Green Bay Packers, including Vince Lombardi; and a 1960s toy Disneyland Monorail set.
161	5	"Chum-p Change"	April 23, 2012
Items appraised include a collection of authenticated and graded notes of 1838 – 1840 paper money from the Republic of Texas and the Government of Texas; an 1886 Winchester repeating rifle that was passed down through four generations of the seller's family; two movie poster printing plates for the 1943 film The Outlaw; and a Discovery Zone "Z-BOP" robot. Also, Rick challenges the others to a rifle-shooting competition.
162	6	"Trigger Happy"	April 23, 2012
Items appraised include a 35mm Bell & Howell documentary film camera used by the U.S. Military during World War II; a three-trigger Stevens shotgun; a 1961 Mercedes-Benz 190 car that's been customized to include features such as 19-inch wheels; and an Abraham Lincoln campaign token from the 1864 Presidential election, which is brought in during the night shift, and requires Olivia to contact Rick.
163	7	"Bossy Pants"	May 21, 2012
Items appraised include a titanium nosepiece from a Lockheed SR-71 Blackbird jet, brought in by the son of an engineer who worked on the plane, and signed by pilots Bill Flanagan and Robert Gilliland; a 1517 bronze cannon; a large pair of vintage Levi's jeans; a homemade Stand Up and Ride motor scooter; and a pair of 1970 Snoopy and Red Baron music boxes.
164	8	"What the Truck"	May 21, 2012
Items appraised include an 1890s 18-karat gold Tiffany's pocket watch; a collection of first series Garbage Pail Kids trading cards from 1985; a 1960s Mercedes Unimog military truck; and a sign from the Berlin Wall. Rick challenges Corey to a go-kart race, and when they arrive at the go-kart track, they unexpectedly meet NASCAR racer Matt Kenseth and invite him to join them in their race.
165	9	"Three Hour Tour"	May 28, 2012
Items appraised include an 1875 (Note: The seller indicates in the episode that the one dollar bill is from 1895, but the onscreen graphic indicates it is dated 1875.) one dollar bill and an 1883 brownback five dollar bill, which were professionally graded Very Fine and Choice About New, respectively, and which were given to the seller by her aunt, whose grandfather was the United States Secretary of the Treasury at the time; a Big-Bang Cannon toy purchased by the seller at a yard sale twenty years earlier; a paperweight from the USS Guadalcanal commemorating its 1944 sinking of the German submarine UB-68; and two prop coconut cups from the TV series Gilligan's Island, brought in by the daughter of Dick Johnson, the special effects technician who worked on that series.
166	10	"Family Feud"	May 28, 2012
Items appraised include William "Cap" Hatfield Jr.'s Winchester Model 1892 rifle, which he used during the Hatfield-McCoy feud; a painting of John Lennon by Denny Dent; and a gavel-shaped Gorham sterling silver inkwell that belonged to William Andrews Clark.
167	11	"Silver Linings"	June 4, 2012
Items appraised include a piece of stained glass art depicting dogs playing poker with a joker from a cigar shop; an early 19th-century manuscript of John Chrysostom's writings handwritten in Russian Church Slavonic; over 200 pounds of silver bars and coins, including a 70-pound bar, which Rick melts down to create 500 commemorative coins in honor of the Old Man; and a collection of props from the 1995 film Batman Forever, including a batarang and one of the pop-up riddles used by the Riddler.
168	12	"Like a Rock"	June 11, 2012
Items appraised include a collection of 19th century Wells Fargo Tiffany belt buckles; a first edition 1955 Chevrolet pickup truck purchased by the seller from the original owner 46 years previously; a collection of casino gaming tokens that belonged to Nevada Senator Howard Cannon, which are brought in by Cannon's grandson; an 1871 Smith & Wesson revolver; and a 1950s U.S. Navy admiral's telephone that the Old Man wants restored for his desk, much to the irritation of Rick, who wants it resold.
169	13	"Dirty Sox"	June 11, 2012
Items appraised include four original paintings by Andy Warhol; a World War II aerial bomber camera, which is accompanied by a photo of it mounted inside a bomber; a pair of 10-karat gold sunglasses that Chumlee purchases during the night shift to resell, but which Rick thinks should better be melted down; and a baseball rule book and baseball signed by seven players, including Hall of Famers Red Faber and Ray Schalk and two members of the 1919 Chicago Black Sox.
170	14	"That Sinking Feeling"	June 18, 2012
Items appraised include a medal commemorating the 1915 sinking of the RMS Lusitania, found by the seller's mother about 20 years previously; an antique voltmeter; an autographed copy of Charles Lindbergh's autobiography, We, which Chumlee buys for $500 without authenticating the signature, much to Rick's anger; and a 17th-century Dutch balance scale.
171	15	"Pin It to Win It"	June 18, 2012
Items appraised include an odd-looking snaphance rifle from the 16th or 17th century; a collection of about 70 vintage baseball pin backs, mostly from the 1930s and 1940s, with most of them featuring images of players such as Roy Campanella, Pee Wee Reese, Jackie Robinson, Satchel Paige, Suitcase Simpson and Babe Ruth; a signed serigraph print of LeRoy Neiman's 1973 painting, Love Story; and a World War II-era leather bomber's helmet.
172	16	"Love Me Spender"	June 25, 2012
Items appraised include a 1955 contract signed by Elvis Presley; a collection of 1945 Japanese militaria, including an enemy plane ID card and manual compass; an early 1890s Winchester Model 1885 .22 Long caliber rifle with an octagon barrel; and a set of 12 paste diamond buttons that was owned by Marie Antoinette.
173	17	"Stalled Deals"	June 25, 2012
Items appraised include a 1918 Buick touring car; a set of wooden boxes carved to look like books that were used in an attempt to smuggle German guns out of Germany during World War II, accompanied by a note indicating that an attempt at their use was unsuccessful; a tennis racket and poster signed by Arthur Ashe; and a copy of the Boston Globe printed the day after the sinking of the Titanic.
174	18	"Hot and Colt"	July 2, 2012
Items appraised include a Colt Paterson revolver prototype; a 1955 Early Series GMC half-ton pickup truck that needs much restoration; a limited edition 1993 reproduction animation cel from the 1960s cartoon Tennessee Tuxedo and His Tales, which features a walrus named Chumley, from which Chumlee's nickname is derived; and a 1964 Flamingo Hotel appraisal book.
175	19	"Stuff It"	July 2, 2012
Items appraised include a Smith & Wesson Model 320 revolving rifle, of which only 977 were made; a railroad inspection mirror and a piece of rail from the 1800s; three mounted animals, one of which is a wolf's head mounted in a deer's rear end that Rick and the Old Man find disturbing; and a collection of Teenage Mutant Ninja Turtles comic books.
176	20	"Jet Setters"	July 9, 2012
Items appraised include an 1868 over/under Wesson derringer; a collection of Boeing aviation memorabilia, including a rare color photograph taken during one of test pilot Alvin M. Johnston's flights; a Stanhope letter opener that incorporates a tiny microphotograph viewer; and a pocket watch that appears to Rick to have been given from one veteran of the Battle of Cross Keys to another. Also, Rick and the Old Man's worries that Corey has inherited the bad eyesight that runs in their family spur him to see an optometrist.
177	21	"Kick the Can"	July 9, 2012
Items appraised include a trio of antique wooden duck decoys; a 1995 World Series Atlanta Braves ring; a 19th-century lighthouse oil can; and a Sho-Bud steel guitar. Also, the Old Man challenges the others to a shotgun target shooting contest in which the loser must pay for a duck dinner.
178	22	"Bullitt Proof"	August 13, 2012
Items appraised include a US Army Signal Corps mobile telegraph unit whose seller says was used in France during World War I in 1917–18, but which Rick identifies as being from World War II; an 1858 Smith & Wesson Model 1 pistol; a 1968 Ford Mustang GT fastback car; a copy of the first Phillips Cigar ad from the turn of the 20th century; and an autographed photo of the early cast of Rawhide, including Clint Eastwood, brought by a woman whose great-great-uncle was a chauffeur for MGM Studios.
179	23	"Cool as Ike"	August 20, 2012
Items appraised include a copy of Crusade in Europe, Dwight D. Eisenhower's wartime memoirs, signed by Eisenhower when he was President of Columbia University; three Continental Can Company freeze-dried food bags made for the Apollo 11 flight; an 1864 Remington New Model Army revolver; and an unopened bottle of 1970 Pétrus Pomerol wine.
180	24	"Free Willie"	August 20, 2012
Items appraised include a brass hand cannon that Rick recognizes as having been made in the past 20 years; a three-wheeled prop taxi from the 1992 science fiction film Freejack; Willie Mays' 1961 San Francisco Giants uniform; and a poster for the Beatles' final official concert, on August 29, 1966 at Candlestick Park in San Francisco. Also, Rick and Chumlee make a bet over Chumlee's accuracy with the hand cannon.
181	25	"Some Like it Not"	August 27, 2012
Item appraised include a piece of one of the $20 bills stolen by D. B. Cooper during his 1971 hijacking; two paintings by actor Tony Curtis; an 1836 artillery foot soldier's sword; and an original newsroom teletype reporting the Kennedy assassination. Also, Corey and Chumlee are assigned to do the shop's annual inventory check, both for tax purposes and to decide which employee will get the store's "booby prize" for the buying the most number of items that have failed to sell.
182	26	"Say It Ain't So"	August 27, 2012
Items appraised include a copy of Say It Ain't So, Joe signed by Shoeless Joe Jackson; an MTV2 Video Music Award Moonman Award that lacks an inscription or any indication of the person to whom it was awarded; a "proto-double-action" .36 caliber Savage 1861 Navy pistol; and a Franklin D. Roosevelt reelection poster for the 1944 United States Presidential election.
183	27	"Fork it Over"	September 3, 2012
Items appraised include a fork from the Hindenburg, brought in by the nephew of a Marine who guarded the wreckage; a dilapidated 1958 Packard Baker car, which Rick wishes to purchase, but which the Old Man characterizes as scrap metal; an 1892 .45–90 Winchester Model 1886 "elephant gun" rifle; and a Yellow Submarine Ringo Starr piggy bank.
184	28	"Thirty Something"	September 3, 2012
Items appraised include a 1975 police Identi-Kit Model II, used to create criminal suspect facial composites sketches; a pair of 1963 Baseball Hall of Fame bust molds of John McGraw and Joe DiMaggio; a 1955 Murray pedal car; and a 1985 Harley-Davidson FXR motorcycle, which Corey and Rick plan as a 30th birthday surprise for Chumlee, who wishes to go to the Sturgis Motorcycle Rally with Rick and Corey, but lacks a working motorcycle.

=== Season 7 (2012–13) ===
No. overall	No. in season	Title	Original release date
185	1	"What You Talkin' 'Bout Sturgis?"	November 5, 2012
Items appraised include a collection of original blueprints of the USS Maine; a wooden airplane propeller from a 1944 Fahlin airplane; and a vintage Gillette travel razor kit, circa 1910, owned by the Shah of Iran, brought in by a man who acquired it from a friend of his father's who lived in Iran in the 1950s. In a crossover with other History programs set at the Sturgis Motorcycle Rally, the Harrisons prepare to give Chumlee the Harley-Davidson FXR for his 30th birthday, but not before leading him to believe that they forgot his birthday, and giving him mundane chores.
186	2	"Sturgis and Acquisitions"	November 5, 2012
Continuing the Sturgis crossover from the previous episode, Corey, Chumlee and Danny Koker ride to the event, while Rick drives there in his motorhome. On his way to Sturgis, Rick visits Ugly Trailer Antiques in Hurricane, Utah. Items that catch his attention include a 110-year-old player piano and a samurai helmet from the late Edo period that Rick informs the owner is worth more than the latter thinks. Also, the Old Man keeps annoying Rick by calling him multiple times, so Rick tells him to only call if there is an emergency. After arriving in Sturgis, Rick finds a 1966 Honda CB160 motorcycle at Gypsie Vintage Cycle and takes Chumlee to visit Mount Rushmore.
187	3	"Three Pawn Night"	November 12, 2012
Items appraised include a Babe Ruth baseball card from his time as a pitcher for the Red Sox, the first ever to feature him in a Major League uniform; a Model 1805 artillery officer's sword made in France from 1805 to 1815, found by the seller's grandfather when cleaning out a building in Pittsburgh, and which the seller believes was used in the War of 1812, which his grandfather; a Pancho Villa marionette brought in during the night shift by a seller who has owned it for 44 years; one of the first polyphonic PS3 keyboards with rhythmic accompaniment, used by the band Three Dog Night when recording the single "It's a Jungle Out There", accompanied by a letter signed by Danny Hutton; and two Victorian-era stained glass windows.
188	4	"Stick to Your Guns"	November 12, 2012
Items appraised include an 1884 .45 Colt single action Army revolver that belonged to Old West Sheriff Fred Coates during the Wyoming Range Wars, accompanied by the original letter of authenticity from Colt and a copy of the book Banditti of the Plains, acquired by the seller's father from Coates' great-great-granddaughter; a watchman's clock, which Rick thinks is from the 1940s or 1950s; a flag cut from a burning World War I fighter plane by the seller's grandfather, accompanied by a dog tag featuring the name of the seller's father, George Pyne, on the front, and that of Quentin Roosevelt on the back; and a pair of 18th-century platinum flip glasses accentuated with onyx diamonds and sapphires. Also, Corey, who wishes to be a partner in the shop, chafes against the elder Harrisons' complaints about his practice of aiding employee cheating on time cards.
189	5	"Lord of the Ring"	November 13, 2012
Items appraised include four antique pistols, one of which is an 1800s Persian pistol made of pure silver; a 19th-century ring that was allegedly owned by a Catholic cardinal; and John Wayne's 1925 high school yearbook.
190	6	"Man. Make. Fire."	November 13, 2012
Items appraised include singer Johnny Cash's driver's license; a 1949 Hudson Commodore car; an ancient fire starter with two flint stones; and a mastodon tusk. Also, Chumlee is challenged to make a fire using only primitive tools, with the reward being a paid day off if he succeeds.
191	7	"On Guard"	November 19, 2012
Items appraised include a pig-shaped barbecue grill with a motorized rotisserie from the 1950s or 1960s; an English Grenadier Guard's uniform from the reign of George VI (1936–52) that was purchased by the seller, a costume shop owner, when he bought out another costume shop 30 years earlier; a 1970s transparent bowling ball that houses a rose within it, much like the one used by Ernie McCracken (Bill Murray) in the 1996 feature film comedy Kingpin; and a guitar whose body is made from a tortoise shell that Rick needs to date to determine if he can legally purchase it.
192	8	"The Last Samurai"	November 19, 2012
Items appraised include an ancient Yasutsugu katana, or samurai sword, circa 1600; a World War II-era Western Electric Beachmaster announcement amplifier, used by the military to direct beach landings, which was found abandoned in a building in the California desert 25 years earlier; and an early 1900s Oscar Onken Company DeLuxe necktie press.
193	9	"Sweet Pawn of Mine"	November 26, 2012
Items appraised include a pair of velvet brocade slippers, silk stockings, and cap said to have been owned by Pope Leo XIII; a Smith & Wesson Model 2 revolver (also known as an Old Model Army); the driver's license belonging to Slash of Guns N' Roses; and three vintage Ava woodcutting saws from 1947 to 1950. Also, Rick is concerned over the amount of coffee his father drinks, and secretly switches him to decaf.
194	10	"The Offer"	November 26, 2012
Items appraised include a 1956 Chevrolet Quarter Mile race car; a collection of ten different barbed wire designs; a 1941 U.S. Navy sextant from the U.S.S. Hector; and an antique Thurston sawing in half box. Corey explores job offers from the shop's competition, feeling that his desire to be made part owner in Gold & Silver hasn't been taken seriously, and informs the elder Harrisons that he will quit if he isn't given 10% ownership of the business.
195	11	"Putt, Putt, Pawn"	December 3, 2012
Items appraised include a red 1950s Vend 81 Pepsi machine that requires restoration; a set of European miniature golf balls; two original signed prints of two Playboy cartoons from 1955; and a copy of John Milton's Paradise Lost, featuring illustrations by Gustave Doré. Also, Rick challenges the others to a game of mini golf, with the loser having to wash the others' cars.
196	12	"Wouldn't It Be Ice?"	December 3, 2012
Items appraised include a bronze statue of the Rampant Colt, the symbol of Colt Firearms, #29 of a limited edition of 100; a World War II Japanese Tuckydanto Type 89 knee mortar; a signed copy of NHL centre Wayne Gretzky's final contract with the New York Rangers; and six Japanese throwing stars. Also, Rick and Corey make a bet to see who can buy an item with the greater profit margin. Observing that Corey has become irritable as he awaits for an answer from the elder Harrisons to his demand for a partnership, the Old Man tells Rick that they must give Corey an answer.
197	13	"Silent but Chumlee"	December 10, 2012
Items appraised include a Silent Scope 2: Dark Silhouette arcade game; an 1874 chopmarked trade dollar; an original Salvador Dalí painting; and a suit of armor for a French carabinier dating from the Second French Empire. Corey teaches Chumlee how to use Skype so he can contact the Harrisons when appraising possible purchases.
198	14	"Take the Money and Run"	December 10, 2012
Items appraised include a Kentucky long rifle; an 1854 hand-cranked electroshock therapy device; a framed poster for the 1974 "Rumble in the Jungle" George Foreman/Muhammad Ali fight; and a framed print of a map of the Western Hemisphere made in the 1700s. Rick and Chumlee bet as to who can shoot the rifle more accurately. Rick finally responds to Corey's demands for a partnership, giving him a raise and a 5% stake in the company, with the possibility of a larger share in the future.
199	15	"It's a Wonderful Pawn"	December 17, 2012
Items appraised include the 1912 Christmas Day menu from Alcatraz Prison; a bomber jacket said to have been worn by Captain Henry S. Huidekoper, a World War II fighter pilot whose plane took 198 bullets and six cannon shots during his time flying with the Hell Hawks; a seat from Dodger Stadium that the seller acquired in 2007 when the stadium was being remodeled; and a 1978 Fiat Spider convertible. Also, Chumlee organizes a Christmas party, over the objections of the Old Man, who feels the shop's expansion has made the annual event too expensive.
200	16	"Santa Chum"	December 17, 2012
Items appraised include the militaria belonging to U.S. soldier Lorenzo W. Cook, including his medals and documents signed by seven U.S. presidents and Robert Todd Lincoln, which Cook collected over the course of his career; a copy of the Italian poster for the 1968 Steve McQueen movie Bullitt; and a 15th-century crossbow from the Bavarian German Army with its original string and windlass intact. Also, Chumlee throws the shop's Christmas party at Danny Koker's bar, Vamp'd, and adamantly imposes strict rules of secrecy regarding the Secret Santa gift exchange, though for reasons that eventually surprise the Harrisons.
201	17	"Little Pawn Shop of Horrors"	January 14, 2013
Items appraised include a collection of props from the 1988 horror film Child's Play, including knives, a voodoo doll and an amulet, brought in by a man who worked as a production assistant on that film; a football signed by members of the 1967 Chicago Bears, including Gale Sayers, Brian Piccolo and coach George Halas, given to the seller's uncle by running back Ronnie Bull; and a 1925 Gibson banjo. The Child's Play props inspire Chumlee to make a film, The Pawning, about the goings-on at the shop, much to the irritation of Rick.
202	18	"I Herd That"	January 14, 2013
Items appraised include an 1874 Sharps buffalo rifle; a framed 1900 aphorism written by Mark Twain; a trinitite souvenir from the Manhattan Project; and five late 1800s pickle castors brought in by a chef who has been collecting them since the 1970s. Chumlee begins to follow the Old Man around the shop in the hope of hearing some notable aphorisms that he can frame and sell for a profit.
203	19	"Funny Money"	January 21, 2013
Items appraised include a copy of the book F.D.R. Meets Ibn Saud, signed by the author William A. Eddy; a scissor katar, which Chumlee, unsurprisingly, starts fooling around with to show off his "ninja skills"; a Picasso lithograph, originally given to the seller's grandfather by Picasso himself; and a saddle used by John Wayne's horse in the 1969 film True Grit.
204	20	"Spare the Rodman"	January 21, 2013
Items appraised include a juror questionnaire from the O.J. Simpson murder trial; a collection of jerseys signed by NBA forward Dennis Rodman, brought in by Rodman's first wife, Annie, in order to pay for their daughter's tuition; a 1950s BMC pedal tractor, which Rick buys for $60 and later sells to Rick Dale for $80; and a World War II M-209 cipher machine.
205	21	"Million Dali Baby"	January 28, 2013
Items appraised include an 1862 atlas; a 1933 pinball machine commemorating the 1933 World's Fair; a limited edition silver sculpture version of the Salvador Dalí painting Geopoliticus Child Watching the Birth of the New Man signed by Dalí, which Chumlee and Olivia purchase for $600 without authenticating during the night shift; and a cow collar given to Dwight D. Eisenhower as a birthday present by the press corps.
206	22	"Hair Force One"	January 28, 2013
Items appraised include a single-person Airboard hovercraft; a Confederate Civil War ribbon that has been passed down through the seller's family, beginning with his great-great grandfather, who fought in the war; a trading card said to contain a strand of George Washington's hair, and signed by Washington; and a carbon fiber Star Wars Stormtrooper helmet. Also, comments by the others about his weight spur Chumlee to visit a nutritionist.
207	23	"Comic Con"	February 4, 2013
Items appraised include an ungraded 1918 $1,000 bill; a collection of 1900s stereoscopic photos and a viewfinder for viewing them; two Spider-Man comic books signed in 1991 and 1992 by writer Stan Lee, who co-created the character (a reprint of Amazing Fantasy #15 and Marvel Tales Starring Spider-Man #43), accompanied by two Spider-Man sketches signed by him, stated to be the only two sketches Lee has ever done; and a Type 89 35mm Japanese machine gun camera. When Corey questions Rick's decision to purchase the $1,000 bill for $2,500, Rick makes a bet with him, agreeing to give the bill to Chumlee if it turns out to be a bad purchase.
208	24	"Off the Hook"	February 4, 2013
Items appraised include a collection of courtroom sketches from the 1954 Sam Sheppard murder trial; an 1895 AT&T phone book; a baseball signed by the members of the 1962 MLB American League All-Star team; and a homemade army tank whose cannon shoots potatoes constructed by the seller and his son. Also, when Chumlee calls out sick, Corey goes to Chumlee's house to investigate.
209	25	"Room and Hoard"	February 11, 2013
Items appraised include a set of keys to the Cook County jail cell where Al Capone was housed during his tax evasion trial; a Japanese kamikaze helmet, brought home by the seller's brother after World War II; an 1861 Confederate half-dollar salvaged in 2003 from the wreckage of the SS Republic; and the gray and gold video game cartridges that were played in the 1990 Nintendo World Championships. Also, Rick tasks Corey and Chumlee with finding the Old Man's collection of pennies that he has been hoarding due to the metallic content of the pennies.
210	26	"Just Shoe It"	February 11, 2013
Items appraised include a 2006 Dutch Arnold & Son Longitude II watch; a collection of vintage handcuffs; and a 1944 panoramic photo of Las Vegas Army Airfield. Also, after Rick promises Chumlee 2% of profits on large deals on items in which Chumlee is knowledgeable, Chumlee takes Rick to shoe collector Jordan Geller's ShoeZeum, a museum billed as the world's largest collection of Nike sneakers, which Jordan hopes to sell altogether for $1 million.
211	27	"Lunch Larceny"	February 18, 2013
Items appraised include a 1922 letter written by Franklin D. Roosevelt; an 1838 Colt Paterson revolver that belonged to Confederate Civil War colonel William R. Manning, and later acquired by Buffalo Bill and returned to Manning's daughter, May Manning Lilly and her husband, Pawnee Bill, which may be the second one of its kind ever made; and a collection of 1980s Bradley Co. children's watches, featuring themes of including Cinderella, Star Wars, and Mr. T. Also, Rick is determined to figure out who keeps stealing his lunch from the staff room. He later discovers that Corey had been stealing his lunches just to be entertained by his reaction.
212	28	"Grand Theft Corey"	February 18, 2013
Items appraised include a customized 1932 Ford roadster built by the seller with an aftermarket body, which Corey keeps taking out for joyrides; the claymation figure of Marilyn Manson that was used in four episodes of the animated TV series Celebrity Deathmatch; three transistor radios that were among the items the United States dropped into Vietnam as part of the U.S.'s "Hearts and Minds" propaganda campaign during the Vietnam War; and a framed diploma from the 1912 Summer Olympics.
213	29	"Beam Me Up"	February 25, 2013
Items appraised include a collection of postcards featuring early 20th century boxers, including a signed one of Jack Johnson; a collection of props from the original Star Trek series, including a phaser, a communicator, a first draft script of the 1986 feature film The Voyage Home, and a Tribble; and a Cold War-era Air Force cockpit clock, taken from a plane by the seller's uncle, an airplane mechanic. Also, Rick and the Old Man give Chumlee a desk to work on, but later come to regret it when he sets up his desk between their desks.
214	30	"Shekel and Hyde"	February 25, 2013
Items appraised include an ancient Tyrian shekel; two original Duesenberg presentation drawings; two engraved 1860 Colt Army revolvers; and a case of 25 cans of 1962 military emergency water, which was found under the floorboards of the decommissioned Peacekeeper missile launch control center at F.E. Warren Air Force Base by the seller's contractor father. Andy, the shop's head of security, later informs the Harrisons that the shekel, for which Rick paid $1,600 and sent away for authentication, may be stolen, requiring it to be put on hold.
215	31	"Book 'Em Rick"	March 4, 2013
Items appraised include a 1947 Masco guitar amplifier that belonged to Hank Williams; a 1484 incunable illuminated book, which Rick wishes to purchase for himself, much to the ire of the others; and an ID card that belonged to Evel Knievel.
216	32	"Corey, I Am Your Father"	March 4, 2013
Items appraised include a campaign hat and poster from John F. Kennedy's 1960 Presidential campaign; a Smith carbine rifle from the Civil War; seven original 1978 Kenner Star Wars action figures; and a custom-carved table modeled after the lower half of a man wearing a Scottish kilt. Also, the men urge Corey to watch Star Wars in order for him to gain insight into the collector market for that franchise's memorabilia.
217	33	"Close, But No Cigar"	March 11, 2013
Items appraised include the mahogany cigar box that John F. Kennedy owned while at the White House, which still holds several unsmoked cigars, and is accompanied by a July 7, 1993 letter from his personal secretary, Evelyn Lincoln, which describes the box; an 1847 Colt Walker .44 caliber revolver that might be a Colt Brevette rather than an authentic Colt; a gold medal from the 1988 Summer Olympics; and an 1870s tooth extractor brought in by a family doctor who collects antique medical devices. Also, Rick's worries over his father's poor diet prompt him and Corey to steal the desserts that the Old Man receives from a Pie of the Month club, while Chumlee continues to try to maintain an improved diet and exercise program.
218	34	"Hello, Goodbye"	March 11, 2013
Items appraised include a poster of alternative album art for the Beatles' Sgt. Pepper album; a chest whose seller believes may be a 400-to-500-year-old pirate's chest, but which turns out to be an Indian dowry chest; and two lithographs by Joan Miró and Marc Chagall. Also, Rick has the shop's collection of classic rock vinyl records moved into the showroom, but Corey and Chumlee, who are given the task, are skeptical that the items will sell. The Harrisons get a special surprise when Steve Carell visits the shop to buy a World War II diver's knife.

=== Season 8 (2013) ===
No. overall	No. in season	Title	Original release date
219	1	"Rick 'n' Roll"	May 30, 2013
Items appraised include a Benjamin air pistol, a collection of 1920s wind-up toys; and two 19th-century medical instruments for removing tonsils. Also, after tricking Rick into believing that they had forgotten his birthday, Chumlee, Corey, and the Old Man surprise him with a ticket to Rock 'N' Roll Fantasy Camp, where he is given the chance to perform with Roger Daltrey from The Who.
220	2	"Grumpy Old Man"	May 30, 2013
Items appraised include a collection of F-16 memorabilia, including two test flight suits; a 1936 chemistry set; a 19th-century silver rattle whistle; and a phone interview between the customer and an angry John F. Kennedy that was recorded shortly after the Birmingham riot of 1963. Rick and the customer travel out of the pawn shop to visit historian Mark Hall-Patton at the Clark County Museum, where they are able to listen to the interview to confirm its originality. Meanwhile, Chumlee is upset at the way the Old Man treats him at work and tries to get video evidence of employee abuse.
221	3	"One Way Ticket"	June 6, 2013
Items appraised include a collection of signed checks by motorcycle racers from 1907 to 1919; Kiss' gold record award for 500,000 copies sold of their debut album, whose seller's uncle worked for the band's printing department; and a Confederate pinfire revolver. Also, Corey plays a prank on Chumlee, fooling him into thinking he has won $10,000 on a scratch card. However, Corey soon discovers that Chumlee knew all along and used the prank as an excuse to take the day off.
222	4	"Unprankable"	June 6, 2013
Items appraised include a 1920s Midland cigar lighter; a 1960 Chevrolet Corvair car; and a framed check reportedly signed by Aaron Burr. Also, Corey continues to try to get revenge on Chumlee, by painting a slogan on the back of his truck. However, Chumlee discovers this and in return fills Corey's truck with packing peanuts. After Corey fails to get back at Chumlee with a chair rigged with an air horn, the Old Man decides to put an end to their prank war.
223	5	"Ready to Rumble"	June 13, 2013
Items appraised include an antique Doxa pocket watch, which intrigues Rick due to its well constructed design; a collection of Keystone viewing slides; and two punching bags reportedly owned by boxer Rocky Marciano, who was close friends with the seller's uncle-in-law. The punching bags inspire the Old Man to express his determination to show off his boxing skills.
224	6	"Dog Day Afternoon"	June 13, 2013
Items appraised include a wood carving of John F. Kennedy, along with a letter from Kennedy thanking the seller's father for the carving; a cavalry sword used by John Wayne in the movie Rio Grande; and a Civil War-era syringe. Also, while Corey is in Los Angeles buying himself a motorcycle, he tasks Chumlee to look after his dog, to the annoyance of Rick and the Old Man.
225	7	"King of Pain"	June 20, 2013
Items appraised include an antique gambling device, which turns out to actually be a cuff holder; a Jim Daly oil painting; an 1800s pull stroller; and a hardtail bobber rat bike. Also, Corey and Chumlee go paintballing, during which Corey injures his ankle and wrist.
226	8	"Free Agent"	June 20, 2013
Items appraised include an antique Popeye piggy bank; a Civil War-era D Moore pistol, which is brought in by Craig Gottlieb, a friend of Rick's who frequently helps him appraise guns brought in by customers; and a signed picture of Benjamin Harrison. Also, the Harrisons enter a trivia contest and exclude Chumlee from the team, so he turns the tables on them with his own team of trivia experts.
227	9	"Sticks and Stones"	June 27, 2013
Items appraised include a framed letter signed by Napoleon Bonaparte; a 1776 continental coin; two 1940s badges from the Las Vegas Police and Clark County Sheriff; and a replica of a 1918 pogo stick. Also, Corey injures his Achilles tendon and spends the day at the shop on crutches. His day continues to go downhill when he buys the Napoleon letter for $2,000 without authenticating it, only to later learn it is a fake.
228	10	"The Pawntridge Family"	June 27, 2013
Items appraised include a first American edition copy of Jules Verne's Twenty Thousand Leagues Under the Seas; an antique corkscrew; and a banner and jacket autographed by Metallica. Also, Rick decides he wants to learn to play guitar and takes lessons.
229	11	"A Hard Day's Pawn"	July 11, 2013
Items appraised include a World War I trophy for horsemanship named after Sgt. Lillard Ailor; and a collection of Beatles memorabilia, including signatures of each member and a Höfner style violin bass guitar. Regular customer Davey comes in looking for decor to redecorate his new condo and buys a painting for $1,500. Also, Rick decides the Old Man needs a hobby, and he, Corey, and Chumlee come up with various suggestions.
230	12	"Fool's Gold"	July 11, 2013
Items appraised include an antique iron lung; a toilet seat from a NASA Space Shuttle; and a signed copy of Hunter S. Thompson's Fear and Loathing in Las Vegas. Also, the Old Man tries to prank Chumlee by sending him to buy bogus items such as a "bucket of steam" and a "left-handed coffee cup."
231	13	"World Series of Pawn"	July 18, 2013
Items appraised include a 1977 World Series Los Angeles Dodgers pennant signed by singer Frank Sinatra; a replica of the DeLorean time machine from Back to the Future; and an antique stock ticker machine. Also, Rick tries to come up with a solution to keep Chumlee from losing his keys, but it backfires when Chumlee makes a game out of it after getting the idea from Corey.
232	14	"Rage Against That Machine"	July 18, 2013
Items appraised include a collection of booby traps from the Vietnam War; a pair of Bucky Dent's cleats from the 1978 American League East tie-breaker game, along with an autographed photo of Dent; and two antique rotating barrel rifles. Also, after Chumlee accidentally breaks the coffee machine in the break room, he tries to compensate for the machine with a new $200 machine, as well as $80 worth of civet coffee, which disgusts Rick and Corey, but which the Old Man surprisingly takes a liking to.
233	15	"Colt to the Touch"	August 1, 2013
Items appraised include an 1800s Colt .45 pistol, supposedly used to kill Jesse James; a 1951 Chevrolet convertible, driven by Steve McQueen in his final movie, The Hunter; a 1980s Centipede tabletop game; and two Chu-Bops albums.
234	16	"Chum-parazzi"	August 1, 2013
Items appraised include a pair of wooly chaps; a framed poem written by Nikola Tesla; and an anchor lamp from the SS Emidio. Meanwhile, Rick tasks Chumlee to get a bass guitar signed by Def Leppard, but instead he ends up getting it signed by a Prince impersonator. Later, Katie Couric visits the shop and buys the framed 1900 aphorism signed by Mark Twain featured in the Season 7 episode "I Herd That" for $12,000, which Rick purchased for $8,500.
235	17	"The Chum-Sake"	August 8, 2013
Items appraised include an antique Apache pistol; two medieval poleaxes; and a sheet of uncut Giori test notes. Also, Corey pranks Chumlee by having him wear a sign to promote the shop on the front, and a message on the back for everyone to call him "Tater Tot."
236	18	"Corey's Big Splurge"	August 8, 2013
Items appraised include a replica proton pack from Ghostbusters; and a manipulated 10-pound note by graffiti artist Banksy known as a "Banksy bill". Also, Rick learns that the Old Man sold his Steve McQueen convertible from Colt to the Touch to an auction in Florida, and he and Corey travel there to see how much they will get out of the car. Corey also attempts to bid on a 1969 Plymouth Road Runner.
237	19	"Secret Agent Man"	August 15, 2013
Items appraised include a framed Bruce Springsteen poster; a toy car replica of James Bond's 1965 Aston Martin DB5; a 1940s Sky King decoder pin; and Boston Red Sox pitcher Brandon Puffer's 2004 World Series Championship ring, which Corey rejects due to Puffer's bad reputation as a convicted sex offender. Also, Corey, Chumlee, and the Old Man get tired of Rick's cranky mood and suggest that he takes a vacation, which he accepts and decides to go to London.
238	20	"London Pawning"	August 15, 2013
This episode serves as the backdoor pilot episode to Pawn Stars UK. Rick's trip to London gets off to a shaky start when he is greeted by his friend Mark Manning's employee, Marco Holland, who offers to show him around London despite having never actually been to the city himself. During his trip, Rick visits an antique map gallery and buys an 1862 map of Nevada and a map of North America from the Dutch Golden Age. When Rick visits Mark's pawn shop, Regal Pawn, items that catch the former's attention include a piece of the hull from the Titanic and a pair of Elton John's boots. Back at Gold & Silver, items appraised include a framed 1782 Pennsylvania brothel license. Also, Corey's friend, Davey, returns to the shop hoping to buy a Rupp Industries motorbike, but is disappointed to learn it is for display only.
239	21	"On a Mission to Pawn"	August 22, 2013
Items appraised include a replica of the Bluesmobile from The Blues Brothers; an original blueprint for the electric chair at Joliet Correctional Center; an antique pigeon racing timer; and a collection of artistic knives. Also, after Chumlee and Corey accidentally break Rick's desk, they offer to help him fix it, but Rick refuses their help. The Old Man, however, decides to buy a new desk for Rick with the shop's money.
240	22	"Goldfish and Silver"	August 22, 2013
Items appraised include a 1989 Honda Pilot ATV; a 1960s Rolling Stones photo signed by all five of the original members; and a 1950s toy Ferrari car. Also, Chumlee brings in a goldfish to represent the shop as a mascot, much to the irritation of the Old Man.
241	23	"What Happens in Vegas"	August 29, 2013
Items appraised include a set of 1948 records of sex education; a 1960s Las Vegas Sheriff's blue book; a 1940s teardrop trailer; and a 1936 General Electric refrigerator. Also, the shop hires a new intern named Lili, whom Chumlee is assigned to train.
242	24	"You're Out"	August 29, 2013
Items appraised include a 1969 Chevrolet Camaro Z28 car; Boston Red Caps manager Harry Wright's 1876 scorebook; and a bat phone signed by Adam West and Burt Ward, who played Batman and Robin, respectively. Also, Rick tries to educate the Old Man on differences between prices in the past and present.
243	25	"Everyday I'm Shufflin'"	October 10, 2013
Items appraised include an antique pump car; a 1967 Shuffle Alley bowling machine; and a prop jewelry box from The Godfather. Also, Rick insists that the Old Man should not be driving without glasses, so he has Chumlee drive the Old Man around until he gets new glasses.
244	26	"The Bald and the Beautiful"	October 10, 2013
Items appraised include a Mercedes golf cart; a jacket owned by Elvis Presley; and an ancient katana. Also, the others consistently ridicule Rick for his bald head, and the Old Man annoys Rick by posting threatening notes around the shop.
245	27	"Say It, Don't Spray It"	October 17, 2013
Items appraised include an antique mining sluice; a customized 1938 Gibson guitar made for Peggy Eames, who appeared in Our Gang and was the seller's mother; and a vintage Buck Rogers toy plane. Also, in an effort to advertise the shop, Chumlee arranges for a friend of his to spray-paint a picture of the Harrisons and himself in the form of Mount Rushmore known as "Mount Pawnmore" on the side of the building.
246	28	"The Enigma"	October 17, 2013
Items appraised include a 1933 Chevrolet Eagle sedan; a World War II-era Enigma machine; and a framed photo of Doc Holliday as a dentist. Also, Corey's spending habits get the best of him when he finds himself broke and meets with a financial advisor who tells him he has to sell his 1969 Plymouth Road Runner, which he purchased in "Corey's Big Splurge." He sells it to Rick, but vows he will get it back.
247	29	"No Shoes, No Shirt, No Service"	October 24, 2013
Items appraised include a customized 2006 Dodge Magnum car; a 1961 Fender Stratocaster guitar, which is brought in by guitarist Vic Flick; and a set of antique English learning tools. Also, Chumlee wants to change the design of the team's work shirts, so Rick gives him one shot to come up with a new design.
248	30	"Comfortably Chum"	October 24, 2013
Items appraised include two Soviet 3-star general's uniforms; and a collection of silver vinaigrette boxes. Also, after Chumlee gets tricked into checking his house for bedbugs, the Old Man invites him to spend the next few nights at his house. Meanwhile, Chop, a local well-known car salesman, visits the shop hoping to buy the 1924 Dodge Brothers sedan from the Season 5 episode "Corey's Big Play," which Rick purchased for $7,500; he sells it to Chop for $7,900.
249	31	"Brush with Greatness"	October 31, 2013
Items appraised include a 1950s crossing guard sign made by Coca-Cola; an 1850s Colt Dragoon pistol owned by one of the original settlers of Texas; and a painting by Muhammad Ali. Also, the Old Man's complaints about the shop wasting money on basic needs provoke Rick to hire a consultant to make the shop run more efficiently.
250	32	"Chum of All Fears"	October 31, 2013
Items appraised in this Halloween-themed episode include a 1977 Mattel electronic football game, which Rick buys for himself for $45; a 1933 Plymouth coupe roadster; and an 1800s derringer. Also, Corey and Chumlee have trouble agreeing on what costumes they should wear together, while Rick's ideas for his costume are ridiculed by the others.
251	33	"Winchester, Lose or Draw"	November 7, 2013
Items appraised include a 1955 Jennings nickel slot machine; an 1873 Winchester rifle said to have been used in the Wounded Knee Massacre; and three Back to the Future commemorative posters used to promote Nike shoes. Also, the Harrisons find a lost dog outside the shop and attempt to find his owner, but Chumlee is more interested in playing with him as well as using him to make viral videos.
252	34	"The Merchant of Vegas"	November 7, 2013
Items appraised include a Cushman motorcycle said to have been used by paratroopers during World War II; a rubber bullet and shell casing from the 1972 Bloody Sunday massacre in Northern Ireland, whose seller's uncle got from a photographer who was there at the time of the event; and a set of silent movie souvenir playing cards. Also, the Harrisons send Chumlee to a mint to design a commemorative coin for the shop.
253	35	"The Bachelor"	November 14, 2013
Items appraised include a rare salesman's copy of The Adventures of Tom Sawyer used as a prospectus for selling the book door to door; a small balance scale from the California gold rush, along with a small tube of gold; and a collection of vintage casino chips embedded in concrete and that were salvaged from casino demolitions. Also, the men throw Rick a bachelor party to prepare him for his upcoming wedding.
254	36	"Cold Hard Cash"	November 14, 2013
Items appraised include Johnny Cash's 1970 Rolls-Royce Silver Shadow car; a military radio from the USS Eldridge; and a coin from the Byzantine Empire. Also, Chumlee volunteers to run Rick's brother-in-law's hot dog stand for a week with hopes of being promoted to a manager.
255	37	"Rebel, Rebel"	November 21, 2013
Items appraised include a 1794 letter written by George Washington nearing the end of the Whiskey Rebellion; an eight-foot Bob's Big Boy statue; and a late 18th-century powder horn. Also, Chumlee buys a new house and throws a housewarming party.
256	38	"Open and Shut Case"	November 21, 2013
Items appraised include a prototype combat vehicle produced for the U.S. military; and a briefcase owned by Charles Lindbergh. Also, Corey sells a 2006 Chinese sword for $1,000, which he purchased at some point prior to this episode for $500. Meanwhile, Corey is the tie-breaking vote in a dispute between Rick and the Old Man over whether or not they should upgrade the shop's display cases.
257	39	"Bad to the Bone"	December 5, 2013
Items appraised include a miniature Ferris wheel powered by a steam engine; a large purple kunzite; and a Civil War-era bone saw. Also, the Old Man encourages Corey to get a haircut along with him, during which Corey discovers that the Old Man treats the barbershop like an all-day-long social club.
258	40	"Gnarly Harley"	December 5, 2013
Items appraised include a customized 1951 Harley Davidson motorcycle; a 1908 barrel organ; and a Babe Ruth poster sponsored by Red Rock Cola. Also, after Lili notices Rick's dirty fingernails, the others convince him to get a manicure, and he reluctantly goes along with Lili and Corey, during which Corey reveals that one of his interests is getting manicures and pedicures.
259	41	"Woah Pilgrim"	December 12, 2013
Items appraised include John Wayne's hat from The Man Who Shot Liberty Valance; an 1866 card-playing book; and a trumpet signed by Herb Alpert. Also, when Corey brings his dog to the shop for the day, the Harrisons try to put her to work. Regular customer Davey teaches Chumlee how he can use the dog to attract women.
260	42	"The Amazing Chumlee"	December 12, 2013
Items appraised include a copy of Amazing Fantasy #15, featuring the first appearance of Spider-Man; an ancient samurai sword, brought in by regular customer Davey, who trades it along with $8,000 for a five-speed custom sand rail, which Rick purchased for $18,500 in the Season 5 episode "Looney Dunes"; and a U.S. Navy phone system from World War II. Also, Chumlee is determined to show the Harrisons he would make a good assistant manager, so Corey gives him a management test.
261	43	"A Very Vegas Christmas"	December 19, 2013
The stars of Pawn Stars, Counting Cars, and American Restoration gather for a Christmas barbecue and debate over some of the best and worst deals they have ever made, then look back at some of the best restorations Rick Dale and Danny Koker have made for the pawn shop.
262	44	"Another Christmas Story"	December 19, 2013
Items appraised in this Christmas-themed episode include a 1920s Lionel Train set; a set of playground equipment from McDonald's; a 1779 copy of Regulations for the Order and Discipline of the Troops of the United States; and an original puppet from Jim Henson's Creature Shop. Also, a customer visits the shop hoping to buy a Golden State Warriors 1975 NBA Championship ring for his fiancée for $5,500, but Rick is adamant at $11,000. Meanwhile, the men compete in a Christmas card competition with a giant prize on the line, during which Chumlee and Antwaun partner up to gather ideas for their final Christmas card, and the Old Man reluctantly agrees to host a Christmas party for the staff.
263	45	"Lost in Spacelander"	December 26, 2013
Items appraised include a 1959 Bowden Spacelander bicycle; a 1950s crapshooter; and a lapdesk made by Samuel Mudd for a prison guard's wife during his imprisonment for his role in the Lincoln assassination. Also, Rick, impressed with Chumlee's recent work ethic improvement, decides that he deserves a bonus, though the Old Man claims otherwise.
264	46	"Put Your Hands Up"	December 26, 2013
Items appraised include a framed 1934 wanted poster for bank robber John Dillinger issued by the FBI; a 1967 Lambretta scooter; and two large blocks of dinosaur coprolite. Also, Rick bets the others on who could walk the most steps in a day when Chumlee shares his progress on his exercise routine. After learning that whoever has the least number of steps has to drive the shop's truck for a day, Corey decides to cheat his way through the bet.

=== Season 9 (2014) ===
No. overall	No. in season	Title	Original release date
265	1	"Finding Fonzie"	January 2, 2014
Items appraised include a handwritten poem by Marilyn Monroe, along with an autographed photo of her; a suitcase-mounted rocket; and a salesman sample of a Dow Corning breast implant. Also, Rick makes Corey and Chumlee clean his office, and to get back at Rick, Corey sells Rick's prized Fonzie photo to Davey Deals for $20. When Rick finds out, he attempts to track it down.
266	2	"You Say You Wanna Revolution"	January 2, 2014
Items appraised include a 1776 copy of The Annual Register; a late 19th-century wombat coat; and a collection of gambling tokens from Nevada State Prison. Also, Rick attempts to help Chumlee fix his laziness by sending him to work for Danny at Count's Kustoms for a week, while at the same time, Danny sends his employee, Roli, to work at Gold & Silver to improve his customer service skills.
267	3	"Truly Trivial"	January 9, 2014
Items appraised include a 2006 Thunder Cycle motorcycle owned by actor James Caan; a book full of Playboy trading cards; and a limited edition lithograph of Charlie Chaplin by Al Hirschfeld, which was purchased by the seller on Hirschfeld's death date. Also, Rick challenges Chumlee to find a trivia question the former cannot answer.
268	4	"Whodunit?"	January 9, 2014
Items appraised include a medallion owned by singer Liberace; a pair of baby Air Jordan shoes and poster autographed by Michael Jordan; and an ammunition handcart from World War II. Also, while Rick and the Old Man are at a coin convention, Chumlee throws a wild birthday party for Antwaun and starts a cake fight in the break room, which Rick later sees on the security camera footage.
269	5	"I'll Be Doggone"	January 16, 2014
Items appraised include a 1960s NASA jetpack; a 1950s Snoopy book with a hand-drawn picture of Lucy Van Pelt by Charles M. Schulz; and a vintage toy bazooka. Also, Chumlee does not like Rick's new commercial for the shop due to not being included, so he attempts to shoot a commercial of his own.
270	6	"Can't Buy Me Love"	January 16, 2014
Items appraised include a signed contract between the Beatles and their manager, Brian Epstein; a Russian Cold War flight suit and helmet; and a taxidermized fruit bat. Also, Chumlee continues to improve his diet and exercise routine, while also trying to get the Old Man to change his eating habits.
271	7	"Anytime, Any Mace"	January 23, 2014
Items appraised include a medieval mace; a 17th-century pocket watch; and a collection of cap guns. Also, the Old Man sends Corey and Chumlee to buy him lunch from a restaurant in Henderson, and they borrow the Old Man's vintage pickup truck without him knowing, but it breaks down on their way back.
272	8	"Silent Stars and Rebel Cars"	January 23, 2014
Items appraised include Charlie Chaplin's international driver's license; and a limited edition 1940 Buick sedan reportedly owned by Fidel Castro. Also, Chumlee tries to come up with ways to earn fast money to buy a new car, which leads to him getting a lecture about investing from Corey's stockbroker. On his way back to the shop, Chumlee is tasked to get a picture framed for Rick, during which Chumlee discovers a 1953 Pablo Picasso painting for sale and buys it for $11,000 with Rick's permission.
273	9	"Smurf and Turf"	January 30, 2014
Items appraised include an 1860s Fisk iron casket; a massive collection of The Smurfs toys; and a blow-dart gun made out of bone. Also, Davey Deals overstays his visit and it ends with him unsuccessfully trying to buy a $2,600 Jimi Hendrix picture for less than $1,000. He later returns, only to learn that the Old Man has banned him from the shop.
274	10	"Sunday Funday"	January 30, 2014
Items appraised include a Super Bowl XXXI football signed by Chicago Bears running back Walter Payton; a 1680 beheading sword; and a Super Bowl I program. Also, the men argue over which one of them should run the shop while the rest take the day off to watch a football game.
275	11	"Rescue 9-1-Chum"	February 6, 2014
Items appraised include a vintage smoke suit air pump; and an 1899 silver certificate on which Corey finds an unexpected error. Also, Chumlee draws the ire of the Harrisons for repeatedly showing up late for work, so Rick sends him to find a helmet that goes with the air pump. Chumlee visits a local firehouse to begin his search, and the firefighters tell him that they have a friend who deals in firefighting antiques; the expert later shows up to the shop looking to sell an 1878 smoke mask helmet.
276	12	"Extreme Pawnover"	February 6, 2014
Items appraised include a unique 1930 Ford Model A car known as a "Hellbilly"; vintage figurines of Pinocchio and Donald Duck; and a vintage World War I poster. Also, while the Old Man goes on vacation for a week, Rick decides that the shop needs some remodeling.
277	13	"Rough and Tumble"	February 13, 2014
Items appraised include a piece of a flag carried by Theodore Roosevelt's Rough Riders; a 1939 foot oscillator; a collection of Grizzly Adams memorabilia; and a collection of Marx tin toy vehicles.
278	14	"The Great Pawnbino"	February 13, 2014
Items appraised include a personal check signed by Babe Ruth; a collection of Navy buttons from the Civil War; and a 1966 Ford camping van. Also, Rick's back starts irritating him, so Chumlee gives him a yoga ball to help him deal with the pain.
279	15	"Rock Bottom"	February 20, 2014
Items appraised include a rock crawler; Dallas Cowboys wide receiver Bob Hayes' 1965 jersey; a vintage drive-in movie speaker; and an 1809 $5 gold coin. Also, the Harrisons read negative online reviews about their customer service skills, provoking Rick to make some changes to his employees' work ethics.
280	16	"Chords, Swords and Rewards"	February 20, 2014
Items appraised include a 1970 Jo Siffert edition Heuer Autavia watch; a 19th-century Freemason sword; and a customized Gibson acoustic guitar. Also, Chumlee tries to show the Harrisons the reasons why he deserves a raise.
281	17	"Magic Bus"	February 27, 2014
Items appraised include a fully-restored 1959 Volkswagen Samba bus; a first day of issue envelope signed by flying ace Chuck Yeager; and a piece of egg art sculpted by Sergio Bustamante. Also, Rick decides to start an Employee of the Month competition to try to motivate his employees to work better. Unfortunately, it makes things worse as Chumlee tries his hand at positions he is not qualified for.
282	18	"Purple Haze"	February 27, 2014
Items appraised include a 1963 Fender Stratocaster guitar, whose seller claims was played by Jimi Hendrix; and a collection of Viking items.
283	19	"Field Trip"	March 6, 2014
Items appraised include a prototype of Semie Moseley's Blue Gospel guitar; an 1892 trade stimulator; and two signed photos of Enola Gay. Also, some children visit the shop for a school field trip and Rick tasks Corey and Chumlee to be tour guides for the day.
284	20	"McKinley Family Jewels"	March 6, 2014
Items appraised include a diamond tiara that belonged to Ida Saxton McKinley, the wife of William McKinley; a Felix the Cat sparkler toy; and an 1880s Giffard air pistol. The tiara's seller initially declines Rick's $43,000 offer, but he later changes his mind and sells it over the phone to Rick, who keeps it a secret from the others.
285	21	"You Snooze, You Lose"	March 13, 2014
Items appraised include a 1628 German two-handed sword; a collection of 1933 baseball cards; and a 1947 letter addressed to Marilyn Monroe stating that her contract with 20th Century Fox has been terminated. Also, Corey starts having trouble sleeping because of his noisy neighbors.
286	22	"Bang Bang"	March 13, 2014
Items appraised include two Reid knuckleduster pistols; a 1960 NFL yearbook; and a Navy embalming kit from World War II. Also, Rick decides that it is time to update the shop's website.
287	23	"Shamrocked"	March 20, 2014
Items appraised include a jacket from the 1939 National Football League All-Star Game, owned by player Joe Carter, who was the seller's stepfather; a 1965 Buick Riviera car; and an Otis Smith pistol, along with a 1938 movie filmed in a Chicago speakeasy. Also, Lili is upset when Corey and Chumlee tease her for being the only one who dresses up for St. Patrick's Day, until the Old Man shows her he is wearing four-leaf clover socks.
288	24	"Head Games"	March 20, 2014
Items appraised include two Green Bay Packers pendants from Super Bowls I and II; two Igorot spears; and a briefcase containing a safety relay system. Also, the Old Man tries to guilt the others into buying something for his birthday by gifting himself a bunch of empty boxes.
289	25	"Choo Choo Chum"	March 27, 2014
Items appraised include a 1901 model of a 3440 City of Truro train, which immediately grabs Chumlee's attention; a plane photo supposedly signed by Howard Hughes; a vintage Dwight D. Eisenhower action figure; and a Marlin Model 1894 rifle.
290	26	"Brew Master"	March 27, 2014
Items appraised include a medal said to be a Polish White Eagle, which Rick buys for $6,000 and later sells for $30,000; a brick from the Indianapolis Motor Speedway; and Woody Guthrie's 1945 songbook. Also, Chumlee starts brewing his own beer.
291	27	"April Fooled"	April 3, 2014
Items appraised include a Civil War-era sword made by Tiffany & Co.; a collection of memorabilia from the USS Chowanoc; and a painting by Martiros Manoukian. Also, Chumlee tries to get back at the others for playing an April Fool's Day prank on him.
292	28	"Tee'd Off"	April 3, 2014
Items appraised include a 1934 USGA rulebook; an organ owned by Steven Tyler; and a 19th-century British Naval surgeon's chest. Also, when Corey complains about his shoulder irritating him, Chumlee decides to help him by taking him out for a game of golf.
293	29	"Chum's Revenge"	April 10, 2014
Items appraised include a 1956 Buick station wagon; a taxidermized cobra; and a Neil Diamond satin jacket with the seller's name stitched on it. Also, Chumlee feels left out when the Harrisons have portraits of themselves hung in the shop, so he arranges for all three portraits to each have a cameo of him.
294	30	"Traffic Jammed"	April 10, 2014
Items appraised include a 1920s Charles Fey & Co. pistol range; a letter recovered from the 1958 crash of United Flight 736, accompanied by a letter from the United States Postal Inspection Service identifying it, which are both brought in by Lili's stepfather; and two fire nozzles from the TS Queen Mary ocean liner. Also, Rick attempts to fix the shop's parking problem by promoting Chumlee to parking lot manager, which backfires when Chumlee lets the position go to his head.
295	31	"Sleeping Giant"	April 17, 2014
Items appraised include a 1969 Les Paul Professional guitar; a 1934 Rolls-Royce hood ornament; and two antique wooden carousel horses. Also, Rick becomes concerned about the Old Man's sleeping habits.
296	32	"Saddle Up"	April 17, 2014
Items appraised include an antique hit-and-miss engine; two unopened Turbo Man action figures from the 1996 film Jingle All the Way; and an Abraham Lincoln campaign poster used in his 1864 re-election campaign. Also, Chumlee convinces the others to join him in horseback riding.
297	33	"Road Test"	April 24, 2014
Items appraised include a 1965 Danelectro Longhorn bass guitar owned by John Entwistle of The Who; a 1968 Richard Nixon campaign paper dress; and a 1940 Indian Chief motorcycle and sidecar. Also, Rick becomes concerned with the Old Man's eyesight after seeing his car parked improperly and decides to give him a driving test.
298	34	"Ponies and Phonies"	April 24, 2014
Items appraised include a Bible that may have been carried by Pony Express riders; an original anti-Nazi poster from World War II; and an R2-D2 Pepsi vending machine. Also, Lili's internship is coming to an end, and the men review her performance in hopes of officially hiring her.
299	35	"Tag Team"	May 1, 2014
Items appraised include a pen that Lyndon B. Johnson used to sign Medicare into law in 1965; a Kentucky long rifle; and a Bible with a 1977 letter from Mickey Mantle to Roger Maris. Also, the men compete over who can buy the best item from a yard sale for less than $50.
300	36	"Fiesta Loco"	May 1, 2014
Items appraised include a painting by Claude Monet; an antique firefighting pump; and a collection of silver bars commemorating the 25th anniversary of Volkswagen. Also, Rick decides to throw a Cinco de Mayo party to educate the others on the holiday, but the others relocate the party behind his back.
301	37	"Spruce Goose"	May 8, 2014
Items appraised include a test piece used to design and build a Spruce Goose plane; a collection of paintings by Stephen Fishwick; and an architect model of Joe Robbie Stadium, the home of the Miami Dolphins. Also, Davey Deals brings the men a box of donuts, and makes a bet with the Old Man, Corey, and Chumlee on what flavor Rick will choose. The bet is delayed when Rick jumps to the false conclusion that the others are trying to prank him.
302	38	"All In"	May 8, 2014
Items appraised include a suicide ring from World War II; an early 20th-century poker cheating device; and a painting by E. Irving Couse. Also, Chumlee is jealous of Rick not inviting him to his weekly poker night, so he and Antwaun start a poker night of their own.
303	39	"Tickets to Ride"	May 15, 2014
Items appraised include two tickets to a pre-screening of A Hard Day's Night; a tiny Gruen pendant watch; and an 1850 Millard Fillmore Presidential Indian Peace Medal. Also, Corey and Rick argue over what the thermostat's temperature should be.
304	40	"New Old Man"	May 15, 2014
Items appraised include a Civil War-era math book; a collection of unopened Cabbage Patch Kids dolls; and a Westinghouse electricity meter. Also, Corey and the Old Man ridicule Rick for buying himself a Porsche and purple sneakers and think he is suffering a midlife crisis.
305	41	"Everybody Do the Dinosaur"	May 22, 2014
Items appraised include a Winchester Model 1860 Henry rifle; two rock-like objects whose seller says are dinosaur eggs; and an 1800s barber chair. Also, Chumlee holds a garage sale at his house, during which he sells a collection of wrestling action figures to Rick for $50, only to later see Rick put them up for sale at $500.
306	42	"Breaking the Bank"	May 22, 2014
Items appraised include an 1861 half eagle $5 gold coin; two antique glass bottles; and a shoe owned and signed by Philadelphia 76ers small forward Julius Erving. Also, Rick discovers that the others have been stealing from his change jar.
307	43	"Reeling and Dealing"	May 29, 2014
Items appraised include a Ronco Popeil pocket fisherman; a 1920s Babe Ruth edition glove; and an odd-looking rock, which turns out to be a concretion. Also, Rick takes Corey and Chumlee fishing.
308	44	"Pawn U"	May 29, 2014
Items appraised include a first edition copy of Mark Twain's A Yankee in King Arthur's Court; an antique surgical kit; and a 1953 Peter Pan animation cel. Also, Rick is invited to give a lecture at a local university.
309	45	"Daddy's Girl"	June 5, 2014
Items appraised include two framed drawings by Keith Haring; a Civil War-era utility tool; and a collection of Dionne quintuplets dolls. Also, Rick takes his daughter out to buy a car from Davey Deals with a budget of $10,000, which proves to be easier said than done.
310	46	"Dam Good Time"	June 5, 2014
Items appraised include two multi-platinum albums by Bob Seger and Pink Floyd; and a photo of George Armstrong Custer and his family that was taken shortly before the Battle of the Little Bighorn. Also, Rick sells a cigar box that belonged to John F. Kennedy for $75,000 (which he purchased in the Season 7 episode "Close, But No Cigar" for $60,000), and uses the money made from the sale to take the staff on a party bus trip to the Hoover Dam, which Corey is not too thrilled about.
311	47	"Who's Your Dali?"	June 12, 2014
Items appraised include a painting from Salvador Dalí's Divine Comedy series; a New Zealand $5 bill signed by mountaineer Edmund Hillary; and an antique baby carriage. Also, Rick is offended when the Old Man rejects his Father's Day gift.
312	48	"Chumlee's Last Laugh"	June 12, 2014
Items appraised include a piece of Baltic amber with a tarantula in it, which requires the seller to spend $200 to have it tested; a pocket watch engraved with Henry Ford II's signature; and a collection of Dukes of Hazzard toys. Also, Chumlee is determined to prove that he is funny enough to be a comedian and gets his chance at an open mic night.
313	49	"Spacing Out"	June 19, 2014
Items appraised include a Space 2005 wristwatch radio; a 1964 Volkswagen Karmann Ghia; and an endorsed Mattie Silks dagger. Also, after Chumlee absent-mindedly puts two Standing Liberty quarters in the shop's slot machine, Rick orders him to get them out. However, the Old Man is more interested in playing the machine than helping Chumlee take it to a locksmith.
314	50	"In the Doghouse"	June 19, 2014
Items appraised include a 1914 Hillerich & Bradsby putter; three framed, hand-drawn maps from the 1944 Normandy invasion; and an ancient coin with Roman Emperor Caligula on it. Also, Rick builds a doghouse for his daughter's dog, and Corey and Chumlee criticize him for it.
315	51	"Get in the Ring"	June 26, 2014
Items appraised include a collection of Rocky Marciano memorabilia, whose seller was best friends with Marciano's brother, Peter; a unique, glow-in-the-dark electric car; and an 1898 slot machine. Also, Chumlee attempts to do his job via video conference.
316	52	"Rick, Rock and Roll"	June 26, 2014
Items appraised include an 1800s bowling ball; two first edition copies of Charles Dickens' A Christmas Carol; and a rock that appears to be a meteorite. Also, Chumlee convinces the others to go bowling with him and even buys them customized bowling shirts.

=== Season 10 (2014) ===
No. overall	No. in season	Title	Original release date
317	1	"Press One for Chum"	July 10, 2014
Items appraised include a first edition copy of Vladimir Nabokov's Lolita; a framed Honus Wagner autograph; and a doll created for the Polish Victims Relief Fund during World War II. Also, Rick installs a new phone system for the shop, but makes the mistake of allowing Chumlee to come up with ideas for the automated voicemail message.
318	2	"Fireworks and Freedom"	July 10, 2014
Items appraised include a Morse code reader from World War II; a 1912 Longines pocket watch from the United States Naval Observatory; and a signed letter by John Quincy Adams. Also, Corey, Chumlee, and the Old Man brainstorm ideas on how they can make Rick's upcoming Fourth of July party more fun.
319	3	"Chumdae"	July 17, 2014
Items appraised include a vintage John Deere machine used for making ice cream, which Chumlee wants to use to start his own ice cream stand; a 1975 Magnavox Odyssey 2 video game console; and a 1967 Shelby Mustang GT 350 car.
320	4	"Put Up Your Nukes"	July 17, 2014
Items appraised include a thermonuclear weapon cover; a 1963 Carvin mandolin, whose seller claims was owned by Bob Wills; and a blood-stained floorboard from the house where General Daniel Sickles had his leg amputated during the Battle of Gettysburg. Also, Chumlee attempts to find something that he can do better than Rick.
321	5	"Pawn Apocalypse"	July 24, 2014
Items appraised include a G30 Chevrolet camper converted into a "survival vehicle", where Chumlee hides to get out of work; a foghorn from the USS Midway; and two T-shirts from Aerosmith's 1978 tour brought in by Ray Tabano, one of the band's founding members.
322	6	"Colts and Vikings"	July 24, 2014
Items appraised include a Colt Army Model 1860 revolver; a collection of limited edition Pepsi cans; and an ancient coin from the Viking era. Also, Chumlee tries to ask Rick for a raise by using subliminal messaging.
323	7	"Mr. Cool"	July 31, 2014
Items appraised include a framed copy of Monolith, the Face of Half Dome; two late 1970s Husqvarna dirt bikes, which spark an argument between Rick and Corey; and a rare 1791 penny with George Washington's face on it.
324	8	"Playboys and Players"	July 31, 2014
Items appraised include a mounted Playboy Bunny tail; a Floyd Nichols fighting knife; a collection of Playboy Club keys; and two 1969 Murray Eliminator bicycles. Also, the Old Man invites Rick to go on a day trip to the shooting range, which proves miserable for Rick as he has to put up with the Old Man's insensitive demands.
325	9	"Go for Chum"	August 7, 2014
Items appraised include an antique moonshine still; a collection of 1950s autographed Hollywood postcards; and an 1800s British nautical telescope. Also, Chumlee develops a bad habit of talking on the phone while working.
326	10	"Shufflin' and Hustlin'"	August 7, 2014
Items appraised include a 1909 copy of Washington Irving's Rip Van Winkle; a Richard Nixon head candle; and a 19th-century arithmometer. Also, Rick takes the others out to play shuffleboard.
327	11	"Bo Knows"	August 14, 2014
Items appraised include a baseball bat signed by Bo Jackson; a pearl necklace that belonged to Lucille Ball; and a copy of Pablo Picasso's La Celestine. Also, Rick starts his own book club and challenges Chumlee to read Moby-Dick.
328	12	"Break Room Battle"	August 14, 2014
Items appraised include a 1963 letter signed by John F. Kennedy the day before the March on Washington for Jobs and Freedom; an antique wine press; and a 1924 circus calliope. Also, Rick hangs a Tim Cantor painting in the break room, which offends Corey and Chumlee and starts a heated debate between the three.
329	13	"Break on Through"	September 1, 2014
Items appraised include a closet door from The Doors singer Jim Morrison's childhood house, which was painted by Jim Warren; a 1988 The Legend of Zelda board game; a large collection of Indian motorcycles, of which Rick wants to only buy one, but which Corey wants to buy all; and an antique French car horn.
330	14	"Tricky Ricky"	September 1, 2014
Items appraised include a jersey autographed by San Diego Chargers quarterback Dan Fouts; a collection of blueprints for the National Military Command Center at the Pentagon; and a vanishing bird cage owned by Harry Blackstone Sr., which is brought in by his daughter-in-law, Gay. Also, Chumlee and Corey convince a reluctant Rick to play fantasy football with them.
331	15	"Pinball Punch"	September 18, 2014
Items appraised include two pinball machines; a World War II-era carrier pigeon capsule; and a poster for Buddy Holly's final concert before his death. Also, Rick starts taking boxing classes, and the others ridicule him for it.
332	16	"Dodging Dillinger"	September 18, 2014
Items appraised include a 1947 Schwinn Whizzer motorbike; a 1992 Stretch Armstrong action figure; and a collection of bullet casings reportedly from John Dillinger's final bank robbery in 1934.
333	17	"Rock Stars and Race Cars"	September 25, 2014
Items appraised include an autographed self-portrait of the Rolling Stones member Ronnie Wood; a collection of 1966 Aurora slot cars; an antique potbelly stove, which turns out to actually be a fireplace; and a collection of letters from actor Mickey Rooney to his second wife, B. J. Baker.
334	18	"Pawn Fiction"	September 25, 2014
Items appraised include a Jack Rabbit Slim's jacket from the 1994 film Pulp Fiction, which is brought in by one of the movie's extras; a pair of opera gloves signed by various old Hollywood stars, including Clark Gable, Rosemary Clooney, and Cesar Romero; and a 1984 Macintosh 128K computer. Also, Rick and one of his experts, Mark Hall-Patton, visit former Lieutenant Governor of Nevada Lonnie Hammargren, who is looking to sell some of his belongings. Items that catch Rick's attention include a huge engine supposedly from the Spruce Goose; a 1960s BMW motorcycle owned by Lonnie's uncle; and a Steinway & Sons piano from the Copa Room at the Sands Hotel and Casino.
335	19	"Birthday Blues"	October 2, 2014
Items appraised include an animatronic parrot; an 1826 book copy of Beethoven's 6th Symphony; and Marilyn Monroe's military ID card, which is signed, "Norma Jeane DiMaggio" (her legal name when she was married to Joe DiMaggio). Also, Corey and Antwaun try to plan a surprise birthday party for Chumlee, but have a hard time keeping it a secret from him.
336	20	"Tough Cookie"	October 2, 2014
Items appraised include a 1940s breast-enlarging kit; a collection of Mr. T dolls; a late 1800s Remington Arms pistol; and a Victor pen vending machine. Also, Corey and Chumlee prank Rick by giving him fake fortune cookies.
337	21	"Van Gogh a Go Go"	October 9, 2014
Items appraised include two lithographs by Vincent van Gogh; an 1880 Knights Templar uniform; and a collection of skateboards. Also, after Chumlee accidentally stains Rick's first edition copy of Tom Sawyer, he tries to clean it up.
338	22	"The Book of Rick"	October 9, 2014
Items appraised include an 1842 copy of the Book of Mormon; a ticket stub for the 1900 Summer Olympics; and a guitar pedal used by Kurt Cobain during one of his 1993 concerts. Also, Chumlee becomes obsessed with insignificant holidays.
339	23	"Smarty Pants"	October 16, 2014
Items appraised include a collection of Italian protest cards from World War I; an 1884 detective camera; and a 1941 Gibson J-200 guitar owned by Stephen Stills of Crosby, Stills and Nash. Also, an argument between Rick and Chumlee over who is smarter leads to them competing over an IQ test.
340	24	"Chummified"	October 16, 2014
Items appraised include a 1978 Harlem Globetrotters basketball autographed by the entire team; a collection of sterling silver souvenir spoons dated from the 1890s to the 1930s; and a mummified Egyptian falcon. Also, Chumlee and the Old Man go metal-detecting in the Old Man's backyard.
341	25	"Secret Admirer"	October 23, 2014
Items appraised include a William Jennings Bryan campaign coin from the 1896 United States presidential election; a 1901 Peerless Harvard dental chair; and two guitars featured in the 1992 film Wayne's World, whose seller is the owner of the music store that was featured in the film. Also, Rick begins receiving anonymous letters and flowers that lead him to believe he is being stalked, until he finds out that this is another one of Corey and Chumlee's pranks.
342	26	"Hidden Treasure"	October 23, 2014
Items appraised include a boot and glove said to have belonged to circus performer Lavinia Warren; an antique pistol concealed in a log; and an etching by Pietro Facchetti. Also, Chumlee finds himself in a tight position when Rick and the Old Man argue over whether or not they should run a promotion for senior customers.
343	27	"Rick's a Riot"	October 30, 2014
Items appraised include a 1969 Gibson Les Paul guitar; a set of late 1800s encyclopedias; an 1878 trade dollar converted into a picture locket; and a Los Angeles Lakers backpack autographed by several players, including Shaquille O'Neal and Kobe Bryant. Also, Corey's complaints about Rick's laugh and Rick's complaints about Chumlee's laziness spark a debate about bad habits.
344	28	"Chum Fever"	October 30, 2014
Items appraised include a Phillips Tradesman delivery bicycle; two antique candlestick telephones; and a 1700s Ch'ien-lung bowl. Also, Chumlee claims he is sick but insists he can still work, while Rick insists he takes a sick day.
345	29	"Biggest Buys & Busts"	November 3, 2014
This retrospective episode spotlights some of the largest and most expensive items appraised on the show, including: the 1890 Hotchkiss gun used during the American Indian Wars from the show's pilot episode "Boom or Bust"; the fire-breathing Robosaurus monster truck from the eponymous Season 3 episode; Jimi Hendrix's 1963 Fender Stratocaster guitar from Season 9's "Purple Haze"; the gold bar from Season 2's "Gold Diggers"; the 1932 V12 Lincoln Roadster from Season 4's "Buy the Book", which Rick purchased for $95,000 in gold, and which this episode states was sold for $120,000 four days after the airing of the original episode; and John F. Kennedy's mahogany cigar box, which Rick purchased for $60,000 in Season 7's "Close, But No Cigar" and later sold for $75,000 in Season 9's "Dam Good Time".
346	30	"Wake Up Call"	November 6, 2014
Items appraised include a 1964 770 Amphicar; a National Bowling Association championship ring; and a Disneyland globe game. Also, Rick, fed up Corey and Chumlee using their cell phones while working, bets them they cannot go a day without their cell phones.
347	31	"The Chum System"	November 6, 2014
Items appraised include a nightstick presented to Ulysses S. Grant; a signed photo of Pete Townshend from The Who; a binder containing a collection of vintage skateboard stickers; and an 1800s farmhouse bell. Also, Chumlee's multitasking skills are put to the test when he is given several tasks to do around the shop. He completes the tasks quickly, but then starts pestering Rick to see if he can go home early.
348	32	"The Adventures of Corey and Chum"	November 10, 2014
This retrospective episode spotlights some of the most notable items Corey and Chumlee have appraised, including: the pair of dueling pistols from Season 3's "Luck of the Draw"; the customized acoustic Gibson guitar from Season 9's "Chords, Swords and Rewards"; the 1969 Plymouth Road Runner from Season 8's "Corey's Big Splurge" and "The Enigma"; the Star Wars action figure collection from Season 7's "Corey, I Am Your Father", which Corey purchased for $7,000, and which this episode states was sold for a total of $12,900 over the course of four months following the airing of the original episode; the pirate ship parade float from Season 4's "Pirate's Booty", which this episode states that Corey got to ride during the 2013 Sturgis Motorcycle Rally, despite never purchasing it; and the Stretch Serpent toy head from Season 4's "Necessary Roughness", which Corey purchased for $500, but which this episode states mysteriously disappeared shortly after the purchase.
349	33	"Captain Rick"	November 13, 2014
Items appraised include a James Cook medal with George III's face on it; a golf putter from the 1963 Frank Sinatra Invitational Golf Tournament; and an antique three-ring laundry mangle. Also, Corey and Chumlee give Rick a lava lamp to help him deal with his stress.
350	34	"McQueen Dreams"	November 13, 2014
Items appraised include a 1943 letter by flying ace Eddie Rickenbacker; two The Great Escape posters from Italy and France, which lead to Rick getting teased by the others for being a Steve McQueen fan; an 1865 swagger stick; and a vintage Planters peanut jar.
351	35	"Reach for Raphael"	November 20, 2014
Items appraised include a print by Raphael; a 1978 Ibanez guitar; and a pair of binoculars from World War I. Also, Corey and Chumlee become curious about Rick's will.
352	36	"Off to the Races"	November 20, 2014
Items appraised include a wooden carved door said to be from Tibet; a vintage Cootie game; and a first edition copy of Dan DeQuille's History of the Big Bonanza. Also, Rick challenges Corey and Chumlee to a race after Corey gets pulled over for speeding.
353	37	"Greatest Haggles"	December 1, 2014
This retrospective episode spotlights items from some of the most notable negotiations between customers and the Harrisons seen on the show, including: the 1932 Ford roadster from Season 7's "Grand Theft Corey"; Ron Dunbar and General Johnson's 1970 Grammy Award from Season 2's "Bumpy Ride", which Rick purchased for $2,350, but which this episode states that Rick later discovered he could not legally sell, forcing him to return it to Dunbar's family; the first American edition copy of Jules Verne's Twenty Thousand Leagues Under the Seas from Season 8's "The Pawntridge Family"; the Giffard air pistol from Season 9's "McKinley Family Jewels"; the Miami Heat 2006 NBA Championship ring from Season 2's "Helmet Head"; and the 1961 Les Paul SG guitar from Season 5's "Les is More".
354	38	"Game Over"	December 4, 2014
Items appraised include a 1960s Gilbert chemistry set; a SCAT hovercraft; a set of Beatles bobblehead dolls; and a Brown County, Wisconsin Sheriff's badge commemorating the Green Bay Packers' victory in Super Bowl XXXI. Also, Chumlee and Corey become obsessed with a Centipede video game that Rick purchased two days earlier.
355	39	"Flying High"	December 4, 2014
Items appraised include a framed skin fragment from a Fokker T-2 plane; a guitar owned and signed by Garry Tallent of the E Street Band; a replica of a 1964 Peace dollar; and a 3D poster of Dean Martin and Jerry Lewis. Also, Rick and Chumlee form a bet to see who can build a better paper airplane.
356	40	"Chum's Secret Stash"	December 11, 2014
Items appraised include a 1907 Saint-Gaudens double eagle relief coin; a chair made up of six 1987 Powell Peralta skateboards; and a pair of Ray-Ban sunglasses said to be owned by George H. W. Bush. Also, Rick discovers that Chumlee has been hiding a number of items the shop has purchased in an effort to buy them for himself.
357	41	"Hiding Houdini"	December 15, 2014
Items appraised include a 1908 signed copy of Harry Houdini's The Unmasking of Robert-Houdin; an antique X-ray unit; a binder filled with unpublished 1960s Paul Newman photos; and a 1977 Hewlett-Packard calculator watch. Also, Chumlee decides to take a vow of silence after reading an article that it will make him more productive, which Rick disagrees, so he and Corey bet to see who can get Chumlee to break his vow.
358	42	"United We Stand"	December 15, 2014
Items appraised include a 1940 BSA motorcycle; a framed set of storyboards from the 1954 Disney film version of Jules Verne's 20,000 Leagues Under the Sea; and a pair of limited edition Roberto Clemente shoes. Also, the elder Harrisons engage in a debate and bet against Corey and Chumlee over certain words being misspelled in the Constitution of the United States.
359	43	"Mini Rick"	December 18, 2014
Items appraised include a 1947 Wurlitzer jukebox; an 1861 broadside by Abraham Lincoln; an antique fly-fishing rod; and a framed Life in Hell lithograph signed by Matt Groening. Also, Chumlee is tasked with babysitting his friend's son and brings him to the shop for the day, which Rick is not thrilled about at first, until he and the boy realize they are both history enthusiasts.
360	44	"Clowning Around"	December 18, 2014
Items appraised include a Civil War sword commemorating the Trent Affair; a 1939 roundup guitar owned by Gene Autry; and a clown painting of Frank Sinatra by Red Skelton. Also, Chumlee tries to sell his own collection of shoes with a two-hour time limit enforced by Rick.
361	45	"Oldest Trick in the Book"	December 18, 2014
Items appraised include a limited edition copy of Heinrich Harrer's Seven Years in Tibet; a gold chain whose seller claims was part of a sunken treasure from the 1715 Treasure Fleet; and a Pillsbury projector box made exclusively for the screening of The Three Stooges.
362	46	"Generation Gap"	December 22, 2014
Items appraised include a 1922 proof Peace dollar; an antique horse racing toy; and a prop Roman shield from the 1963 film Cleopatra. Also, the men argue over whose generation is the best.
363	47	"Motorcycle Mayhem"	December 22, 2014
Items appraised include an oil painting of Ho Chi Minh; a 1957 Harley-Davidson Sportster motorcycle; and a 1983 Seiko TV watch used in the James Bond film Octopussy. Also, Chumlee exploits Rick and Corey into "sharing" their things with him, and it comes back to bite him when they "borrow" his truck.

=== Season 11 (2015) ===
No. overall	No. in season	Title	Original release date	US viewers (millions)
364	1	"Old Man Corey"	January 8, 2015	N/A
Items appraised include a 1966 Harley-Davidson Shovelhead motorcycle; a collection of 1960s NBC TV show posters; and an ancient sandstone apsara statue said to be from the 10th century. Also, the others notice that Corey is starting to get grey hair and tease him for it.
365	2	"Trading Up"	January 8, 2015	N/A
Items appraised include a large copy of the final page of the final The Adventures of Rocky and Bullwinkle and Friends comic book ever published; a vintage May Bell banjo; and a signed first edition copy of Richard Nixon's memoir book. Also, Chumlee becomes obsessed with trading after hearing about a man who made a lot of trades starting with his phone, and ended up getting a Porsche.
366	3	"RC/DC"	January 15, 2015	N/A
Items appraised include a Civil War-era Remington Arms Navy revolver; a large gold-colored Richard Nixon head; and a vinyl copy of AC/DC's Let There Be Rock autographed by the band's original members. Also, Rick is given an opportunity to advertise the shop by sponsoring a remote-controlled race car for a race in Boulder City.
367	4	"Wilde Card"	January 15, 2015	N/A
Items appraised include a first edition copy of Oscar Wilde's The Happy Prince and Other Tales; an antique piston ribbon steam engine; an unopened Pee-wee's Playhouse playset; and a 1970 Muhammad Ali telegram with his real name, Cassius Clay, printed on it. Also, Chumlee annoys Rick by talking in slang that the latter cannot fully understand.
368	5	"Money Ball"	January 22, 2015	N/A
Items appraised include a photo of Babe Ruth with the Boston Red Sox during his rookie season in 1915; a 1981 Honda CR80 Elsinore motorcycle; and a collection of photos and documents owned by Franklin D. Roosevelt's head nurse. Also, Chumlee becomes impatient when he has to wait for Rick to pay him back $150 for a concert ticket.
369	6	"Presidential Pawn"	January 22, 2015	N/A
Items appraised include a handwritten letter by James Monroe prior to his presidency; a Playboy rabbit head swivel chair, which leads to Chumlee trying to do a Hugh Hefner impersonation; a collection of promotional rings from The Green Hornet TV series; and two antique dictaphones.
370	7	"The Smoking Gun"	January 25, 2015	N/A
Items appraised include two vintage Donald Duck ice cream signs; a copy of the Jay Treaty, whose seller claims was owned by Thomas Jefferson; a 1762 Grice Brown Bess musket; a World War I-era horse gas mask; a tiny trailer house hand-buit from wood and other recyclable materials; a speed gauge from a Lockheed SR-71 Blackbird spy plane; a broken 1970s Gibson Marauder guitar, whose seller says was played and broken by Paul Stanley from Kiss; and an 1881 Marlin rifle. Also, Chumlee complains about being bored while working, but Rick tells him that only exciting things can happen when he does not expect them, and Chumlee misses the opportunity to try out the Marlin rifle.
371	8	"Rick Gets Axed"	February 12, 2015	N/A
Items appraised include a piece of Spider-Man and Batman comic book art; a brick from singer Janis Joplin's childhood home in Port Arthur, Texas; and a Revolutionary War-era halberd. Also, Chumlee, tired of coming to work in the same uniform, convinces a reluctant Rick to start Casual Friday for the shop's employees.
372	9	"Rick the Giant"	February 12, 2015	N/A
Items appraised include a collection of art posters by Shepard Fairey; an antique rangefinder; and an unopened Mork doll. Also, Rick gets tired of Chumlee treating him like a friend instead of a boss when Chumlee picks Rick up from the airport and expects him to return the favor by helping him move a couch.
373	10	"Underground Pawn"	February 19, 2015	N/A
Items appraised include a copy of E. M. Pettit's Underground Railroad Sketches; a 1959 Honda Benly motorcycle; and a collection of 1991 baseball cards, which inspire Chumlee to create his own trading cards.
374	11	"Bucking Bronco"	February 19, 2015	N/A
Items appraised include two signed albums by the Red Hot Chili Peppers; a Mobo wooden horse; and a 1700s Baroque diamond cross. Also, Chumlee has a dispute with Rick and Corey over the shop's "no headwear" policy for the employees.
375	12	"Rocky Road"	February 26, 2015	N/A
Items appraised include two lithographs by Norman Rockwell; a vintage Relax-IT massager; a block of plaster with Sylvester Stallone's handprints; and a vintage Sky King pedal plane.
376	13	"All Hail Rick"	February 26, 2015	N/A
Items appraised include a 1782 taxation document signed by George III; two vintage Cushman Eagle scooters; a 1934 Daisy air rifle, which Rick, Corey, and Chumlee have a shooting competition with; and an antique hearing aid cane.
377	14	"Live Long and Prosper"	March 5, 2015	N/A
Items appraised include an Eli Whitney Civil War revolver; an autographed photo of the original Star Trek cast; and a pair of 1930s Carl Zeiss jewelry loupes. Also, Chumlee gets upset when Corey blocks him from his social media accounts.
378	15	"Sword Play"	March 5, 2015	N/A
Items appraised include two 1800s European swords; a 1946 Douglas Airview magazine; a 1951 Willys station wagon; and a 1923 De Forest D-7A tube radio.
379	16	"One Man's Junk"	March 12, 2015	N/A
Items appraised include a baseball seemingly autographed by the 1959 World Series Champion Los Angeles Dodgers, but which turns out to actually be signed by the 1957 team (their final year in Brooklyn); an antique Tiffany & Co. clock; a vintage Berndt-Maurer movie camera; and a collection of commemorative belt buckles from the Attica Correctional Facility. Also, Rick decides to ban junk food from the shop in an effort to get all the employees to eat healthier, which the others start to revolt against.
380	17	"Last Call Pawn"	March 12, 2015	N/A
Items appraised include an 1895 Morgan dollar; an antique German symphonium; and a 1972 baseball pinball machine. Also, Corey attempts to juggle his job at the shop with running his new bar.
381	18	"Hot Dam"	March 19, 2015	N/A
Items appraised include a set of 1932 blueprints for the Hoover Dam; a collection of autographed 1960s and 1970s concert posters; and an antique doll carriage. Also, after Chumlee accidentally breaks Rick's sunglasses and tries to replace them with a cheap pair, he bets Rick that he cannot tell the difference between all real and fake items.
382	19	"Son of a Gun"	March 19, 2015	N/A
Items appraised include an 1800s Wilkinson turret rifle; and a collection of celebrity engraved matchboxes from the private jet, The Starship. Also, Chumlee volunteers to help write descriptive cards for the shop's merchandise, but the others are concerned that he does not know enough about the items.
383	20	"Crossing Chum"	March 26, 2015	2.32
Items appraised include a Panama Canal service medal; two books filled with Wacky Packages, which Chumlee buys for $500 without authenticating, leading to him getting another lecture from Rick when the retail value is determined to be $300; an antique crossbow; and an antique toy mail cart.
384	21	"Mystery Caller"	March 26, 2015	2.57
Items appraised include a charcoal drawing by Edward Hopper; a Superman vs. Muhammad Ali comic book; and a 1970s eight-track tape player, plus a collection of tapes. Also, Rick is convinced that the shop's phone system is malfunctioning when he cannot hear the callers, until he realizes that the Old Man's new smartphone has been pocket dialing the shop.
385	22	"Hot Wheel of Fortune"	April 2, 2015 two	N/A
Items appraised include a rare 1969 Hot Wheels prototype Beach Bomb Volkswagen bus; two 1970 UFO-shaped Weltron stereos; and an etching by Rembrandt. Also, Chumlee decides to write his own memoir after seeing Rick read Sammy Davis Jr.'s memoir.
386	23	"Mail Mayhem"	April 9, 2015	N/A
Items appraised include a signed first edition copy of L. Frank Baum's The Wonderful Wizard of Oz; an unopened He-Man action figure; a Turbo Drive 2 arcade game; and a U.S. Army officer's mess kit from 1960. Also, Rick becomes concerned when some books that he ordered are late to be delivered.
387	24	"Priciest Pawns"	April 23, 2015	N/A
This retrospective episode spotlights some of the most expensive items appraised on the show, including: the 1967 Shelby Mustang GT 350 from Season 10's "Chumdae"; the Hotchkiss revolving cannon from Season 4's "Weird Science"; the 1942 AT-6 Texan fighter plane from Season 6's "Wild Thing"; the Enigma machine from the eponymous Season 8 episode; Stephen Stills' 1941 Gibson J-200 guitar from Season 10's "Smarty Pants"; and the silver bar and coin collection from Season 6's "Silver Linings".
388	25	"Monumental Pawn"	April 23, 2015	N/A
Items appraised include a 1966 Chevy II car; a souvenir program from the unveiling of the Statue of Liberty; and a collection of Kewpie dolls. Also, Corey, jealous of Rick owning a company truck with his face on it, seeks to own a company vehicle of his own.
389	26	"Avengers Assemble"	May 7, 2015	N/A
Items appraised include the first issues of The Avengers and Giant-Size X-Men; a cane owned by William Pinkerton, the son of Civil War detective Allan Pinkerton; and an 1893 McCray icebox. Also, Chumlee attempts to sell Rick a comic book the former stole from Corey when they were kids.
390	27	"Locked and Loaded"	May 7, 2015	N/A
Items appraised include an 1890s cane with a small brass telescope fitted on the end; a 1763 French flintlock pistol; a collection of Star Wars props; and an antique Japanese Satsuma flask, which turns out to actually be a Chinese Taoist flask.
391	28	"Rick's Roulette"	May 14, 2015	N/A
Rick travels to Julien's Auctions in Los Angeles looking to sell some of the shop's items. Items that also catch his attention prior to the auction include an autographed photo of Cher, along with a piece of sheet music of the song "I Got You Babe", signed by Sonny Bono; three Mickey Mouse store window displays; a model rocket ship that was used for the 1936 Flash Gordon serial; and a 1905 lighthouse foghorn. Back in Las Vegas, items appraised include two antique dip needles; an Ultra4 race car; a conductor's baton made of ivory and silver; and a collection of keyhole drinking glasses. Also, Chumlee decides to hold an auction of his own.
392	29	"Fake or Fortune"	May 21, 2015	N/A
This retrospective episode spotlights some of the most notable items that were deemed either fake or genuine on the show, including: the 1715 Spanish fleet gold coin from Season 2's "Trail Breaker"; the Claude Monet painting from Season 9's "Fiesta Loco"; Thomas Jefferson's copy of the Jay Treaty from Season 11's "The Smoking Gun"; the Beatles memorabilia collection from Season 8's "A Hard Day's Pawn"; the Fabergé black widow brooch from Season 3's "Getting a Head"; and the 1950s Hollywood postcard collection from Season 10's "Go for Chum".
393	30	"Pawn Creature"	May 21, 2015	N/A
Items appraised include a handwritten letter from Judy Garland to Frank Sinatra; a life-size figure of the Creature from the Black Lagoon; a 1920s buoy light from the English Channel; and a Vectrex video game system. Also, Chumlee attempts to find something that scares Rick.
394	31	"Behind the Wheel"	May 25, 2015	N/A
Items appraised include a 1923 Babe Ruth baseball card; a 1930s tricycle; and an invitation to John F. Kennedy's luncheon on the day of his assassination. Also, Corey damages his new company truck and is forced to borrow Rick's.
395	32	"Ticket to Pawn"	May 25, 2015	N/A
Items appraised include a guitar autographed by the Beatles; a 1981 Suzuki GS1100 drag bike; a vintage mirroscope; and an 1863 American Express stock certificate signed by Henry Wells and J. C. Fargo.
396	33	"Dangerous Deals"	May 28, 2015	N/A
This retrospective episode spotlights some of the deadliest items appraised on the show, including: the parade cannon from Season 5's "Buyer Beware"; the LeMat combination pistol from Season 5's "Guns Blazing"; the Gatling gun from Season 4's "Sharpe Shooters"; J.D. Borthwick's gambling and weapon set from Season 3's "Ace in the Hole"; the pair of Soviet launch keys from Season 2's "Big Guns"; and the French double-barrel coach gun from Season 2's "Pezzed Off".
397	34	"Penny for Your Pawn"	May 28, 2015	N/A
Items appraised include a sculpture by Anthony Quinn; a 1930s Gottlieb grip tester; and a vintage New York City Fire Department pin. Also, Chumlee attempts to advertise the shop by creating memes of himself and the Old Man.
398	35	"Expert Examinations"	June 4, 2015	N/A
This retrospective episode spotlights items from some of the most notable examinations by the show's experts, including: the 1842 copy of the Book of Mormon from Season 10's "The Book of Rick"; the Caligula coin from Season 9's "In the Doghouse"; Harry Houdini's straitjacket from Season 4's "The Great Escape"; the John Wilkes Booth wanted poster from Season 4's "Broadsiding Lincoln"; the Babe Ruth signed baseball bat and glove from Season 5's "Mile High Club"; and the Battle of Iwo Jima plans from Season 2's "Top Secret".
399	36	"Pawn of the Jedi"	June 4, 2015	N/A
Items appraised include a copy of the final draft of the script to the original trilogy of Star Wars signed by George Lucas; a Tiffany & Co. sterling silver ice bucket; a Benjamin Franklin terracotta medallion; and a 1933 yearbook signed by Tokyo Rose. Also, Chumlee wants to turn the shop's warehouse into a museum, an idea that Rick accepts, until Chumlee starts charging customers to look around.
400	37	"Most Mysterious"	June 11, 2015	N/A
This retrospective episode spotlights some of the most mysterious items appraised on the show, including: the 1964 770 Amphicar from Season 10's "Wake Up Call"; the vintage handcuff collection from Season 7's "Just Shoe It"; the concretion from Season 9's "Reeling and Deeling"; the ivory sundial from Season 2's "Backroom Brawl"; the prosthetic eyeball collection from Season 4's "Evel Genius"; the two dinosaur coprolite blocks from Season 8's "Put Your Hands Up"; and the Master Violet Ray #11 electrotherapy kit from Season 4's "Weird Science".
401	38	"Coolest Collectibles"	June 11, 2015	N/A
This retrospective episode spotlights some of the coolest items appraised on the show, including: Elvis Presley's jacket from Season 8's "The Bald and the Beautiful"; the copy of The Amazing Spider-Man #1 from Season 5's "Cash Cash Bang Bang"; shoe collector Jordan Geller's ShoeZeum from Season 7's "Just Shoe It"; the first issue of Playboy magazine from Season 2's "A Whale of a Time"; the Star Trek memorabilia collection from Season 4's "Cannons and Klingons"; and the Batmobile replica from Season 3's "Chummobile".
402	39	"Greatest Gambles"	July 20, 2015	N/A
This retrospective episode spotlights items from some of the riskiest deals featured on the show, including: the print of Albrecht Dürer's engraving Knight, Death and the Devil from Season 5's "Apocalypse Wow"; the clump of silver 1702 rupees from Season 2's "Shocking Chum"; the copy of Say It Ain't So, Joe signed by Shoeless Joe Jackson from the eponymous Season 6 episode (referring to the book); the Gibson mandolin from Season 4's "Face the Music"; the Polish White Eagle medal from Season 9's "Brew Master", which Rick purchased for $6,000, and which this episode states was later sold for $30,000; and the 1984 Chris-Craft boat from Season 1's "Sink or Sell".
403	40	"Wheelin' and Dealin'"	July 27, 2015	N/A
This retrospective episode spotlights some of the most notable vehicles appraised on the show, including: the rock crawler from Season 9's "Rock Bottom"; the 1929 Ford Model A Roadster from Season 1's "Rope a Dope"; the Indian motorcycle collection from Season 10's "Break on Through"; the 1970s custom dragster from Season 3's "Ready, Set, Pawn"; the 1915 Ford Model T taxi from Season 4's "Sharpe Shooters", which Corey purchased for $21,000, and which this episode states was sold for $29,700 at auction three months later; and the John Deere ice cream machine from Season 10's "Chumdae".
404	41	"Personal Collection"	August 3, 2015	N/A
This retrospective episode spotlights some of the most notable items the cast has intended to buy for themselves, including: Ricky Bryant's Super Bowl XXXIX ring from Season 5's "Patriot Games"; Steve McQueen's 1940 Indian motorcycle from Season 4's "Kings and McQueens"; the 1484 incunable illuminated book from Season 7's "Book 'Em Rick"; the 1939 foot oscillator from Season 9's "Rough and Tumble"; the 3440 City of Truro model train from Season 9's "Choo Choo Chum"; and the 1986 Buick Regal from Season 4's "Missile Attack".
405	42	"On the Road"	August 10, 2015	N/A
This retrospective episode spotlights some of the most notable items the cast has appraised outside of Gold & Silver, including: the samurai helmet from Season 7's "Sturgis and Acquisitions"; the SCAT hovercraft from Season 10's "Game Over"; the Steinway & Sons piano from Season 10's "Pawn Fiction"; the Magnum, P.I. cannon from Season 4's "Cannons and Klingons"; the 1862 Nevada and Dutch Golden Age-era North America maps from Season 8's "London Pawning"; and the Aero L-39 Albatros fighter jet from Season 5's "Mile High Club".

=== Season 12 (2015–16) ===
No. overall	No. in season	Title	Original release date
406	1	"Pawn of Fire"	October 22, 2015
Items appraised include a 1972 Cadillac Eldorado car; a 1932 Lionel model train originally owned by Johnny Cash; a 1920s chicken incubator; and an 18th-century Tibetan Buddha statue.
407	2	"Party On, Pawn"	October 22, 2015
Items appraised include a 1940s Buster Brown Shoes repair bench and a 1925 baseball bat signed by Ty Cobb and Joe Sewell. Also, Rick travels to a coin convention in Florida looking for a 1915 Panama-Pacific $50 gold coin. Soon after, he unexpectedly stumbles upon the 1976 AMC Pacer car from the 1992 film Wayne's World.
408	3	"Fender Bender"	October 29, 2015
Items appraised include an antique Japanese matchlock rifle; a 1952 Fender Telecaster guitar, which Corey buys for $13,000 and later sells for $30,000 without Rick knowing, leading him to blame Chumlee for the guitar's disappearance; and a 1939 Superman doll.
409	4	"Godfather of Pawn"	October 29, 2015
Items appraised include a jumpsuit and pair of boots owned by James Brown; a 1920s popcorn machine; a limited edition Tom and Jerry artist's proof of the 1945 film Anchors Aweigh; and a 1917 Standing Liberty quarter.
410	5	"Napoleon Bonapawn"	November 5, 2015
Items appraised include a limited edition Rolling Stones promotional album; a football from the first Pro Football Hall of Fame Game in 1962, signed by New York Giants quarterback Y. A. Tittle; a collection of Donald Duck model sheets; and three swords from the Napoleonic era.
411	6	"Eye of the Tiger"	November 5, 2015
Items appraised include a Flying Tigers banner; a 1980s Ooze-It toy, which Chumlee starts playing with, to Rick's annoyance; and an illustration painting for the 1928 silent film Two Lovers.
412	7	"Promissory Pawn"	November 12, 2015
Items appraised include a promissory note from the Mexican–American War; a water-propelled jetpack; and a Shiva statue.
413	8	"Riders on the Pawn"	November 12, 2015
Items appraised include two antique flintlock pistols; a 1961 George Washington High School yearbook from The Doors singer Jim Morrison's senior year; a rescue buoy from the TV series Baywatch, signed by David Hasselhoff; and a solar-powered bicycle. Also, the men have a contest to determine whose high school picture is the best.
414	9	"Prohibition Pawn"	November 19, 2015
Items appraised include an 1834 copy of the Book of Sports; a Civil War-era drum; an antique cast-iron ice shaver; a corkscrew commemorating the end of the Prohibition era; and a 1970s Nash skateboard.
415	10	"60's Pawn"	November 19, 2015
This retrospective episode spotlights some of the most notable 1960s items appraised on the show, including: the Playboy Bunny outfit from Season 4's "Missile Attack"; the piece of Apollo 11's heat shield from Season 5's "Over the Moon"; the Adam West and Burt Ward signed bat phone from Season 8's "You're Out"; Lyndon B. Johnson's golf ball from Season 5's "Hole in One"; the two Gilligan's Island coconut cups from Season 6's "Three Hour Tour"; the 1966 Beatles concert ticket from Season 4's "The Pick, the Pawn, and the Polish"; and the Jimi Hendrix photo collection from Season 5's "Looney Dunes".
416	11	"Money Makers"	November 22, 2015
This retrospective episode spotlights some of the most expensive items appraised on the show, including: the 1961 Fender Stratocaster guitar from Season 8's "No Shoes, No Shirt, No Service"; the Edward Hopper charcoal drawing from Season 11's "Mystery Caller"; the three Mickey Mouse store window displays from Season 11's "Rick's Roulette"; the Rocky Marciano memorabilia collection from Season 9's "Get in the Ring"; the 1922 proof Peace dollar from Season 10's "Generation Gap", which Rick purchased for $80,000, and which this episode states was later sold for $99,875 at auction; the 1930 Ford Model A "Hellbilly" from Season 9's "Extreme Pawnover"; the Star Wars prop collection from Season 11's "Locked and Loaded"; and the 2003 Cameron A250 hot air balloon from Season 1's "Hot Air Buffoon".
417	12	"70's Pawn"	November 29, 2015
This retrospective episode spotlights some of the most notable 1970s items appraised on the show, including: the two 1978 Aerosmith T-shirts from Season 10's "Pawn Apocalypse"; Secretariat's horseshoe from Season 4's "Pipe Dreams"; the large gold-colored Richard Nixon head from Season 11's "RC/DC"; the Arthur Ashe autographed tennis racket and poster from Season 6's "Stalled Deals"; the Apollo 16 flag from Season 2's "Moon Walking"; the 1977 Mattel electronic football game from Season 8's "Chum of All Fears"; and the final draft of the script to the original trilogy of Star Wars signed by George Lucas from Season 11's "Pawn of the Jedi".
418	13	"80's Pawn"	December 3, 2015
This retrospective episode spotlights some of the most notable 1980s items appraised on the show, including: the 1984 Summer Olympics torch and the life-size Mario statue, which were both featured in Season 5's "Blaze of Glory"; Ronald Reagan's 1928 high school yearbook from Season 4's "Buffalo Bull"; the 1981 DeLorean sports car from Season 3's "Chumdog Millionaire"; the 1988 Apple IIGS computer from Season 3's "Wise Guys"; the Metallica autographed banner and jacket from Season 8's "The Pawntridge Family"; the recalled Star Wars: Return of the Jedi poster from Season 3's "Going Postal"; and the Ghostbusters proton pack from Season 8's "Corey's Big Splurge".
419	14	"Pawn in the USA"	December 3, 2015
Items appraised include two paintings by David Mann; a 1970s spy pen radio; a 19th-century sulky; and a Bruce Springsteen Born in the U.S.A. Tour jacket. Also, Chumlee builds a submarine out of cardboard to give to Rick as a present.
420	15	"90's Pawn"	December 6, 2015
This retrospective episode spotlights some of the most notable 1990s items appraised on the show, including: Kurt Cobain's guitar pedal from Season 10's "The Book of Rick"; the O.J. Simpson murder trial juror questionnaire and the collection of Dennis Rodman's jerseys, which were both featured in Season 7's "Spare the Rodman"; the Jack Rabbit Slim's jacket from Season 10's "Pawn Fiction"; the three 1997 photo negatives of Michael Jackson from Season 2's "Deals from Hell"; the Life in Hell lithograph signed by Matt Groening from Season 10's "Mini Rick"; and the two Wayne's World guitars from Season 10's "Secret Admirer".
421	16	"Capture the Pawn"	December 10, 2015
Items appraised include an 1861 Sharps & Hankins experimental rifle; two antique door knockers; an 1840s chess table; and a 1589 copy of Instructions for the Warres.
422	17	"The Star Wars Vault"	December 10, 2015
This retrospective episode spotlights some of the most notable Star Wars items appraised on the show.
423	18	"Wicked Weapons"	December 17, 2015
This retrospective episode spotlights some of the most notable weapons appraised on the show, including: the thermonuclear weapon cover from Season 10's "Put Up Your Nukes", which Rick purchased for $625, but which this episode states was later sold for $576 at auction, generating a $49 loss on this item; the 1830s Nock percussion pistol from Season 4's "High Stakes"; the artistic knife collection from Season 8's "On a Mission to Pawn"; the replica signal cannon from Season 1's "Pawn Shop Pinot"; the gun desk from Season 3's "Chummobile"; the 1700s half-scale musket from Season 3's "Pawn Illustrated"; and the bowling ball mortar from Season 2's "Strike, Spare, BOOM".
424	19	"The Pawn Before Christmas"	December 17, 2015
Items appraised in this Christmas-themed episode include a tin box that was a Christmas gift for a British soldier in 1914; an 1840s Rector hunting rifle; a collection of unpublished Mad magazine cover art; and an antique cutter sleigh. Also, Corey tries to remind Rick of the times the latter did not give the former any Christmas presents.
425	20	"The Pawn Awakens"	January 6, 2016
Items appraised include a 1979 Boba Fett prototype action figure; an antique Shelby bicycle fitted with a motor; and a Hutchison Spool-O-Wire. Also, Rick's Star Wars and autograph expert Steve visits the shop hoping to sell a collection of signed Star Wars trading cards, a Star Wars poster signed by a number of the cast and crew members, and a set piece used for filming close-ups of the outside of the Death Star.
426	21	"Titanic Pawn"	January 6, 2016
Items appraised include a 1906 Barber half-dollar that belonged to a passenger on the RMS Titanic; a first edition copy of Robert Louis Stevenson's The Strange Case of Dr. Jekyll and Mr. Hyde; two Victorian-era pewter mugs; an altimeter from a Howard Hughes plane, which turns out to actually be a steam boiler gauge; and a 1936 Zeiss movie camera.
427	22	"Racing Revolution"	January 13, 2016
Items appraised include a 1600s lobster-tailed pot helmet from Oliver Cromwell's army; an 1800s apple peeler; a limited edition 2014 Hertz Penske GT Mustang car, which Rick appraises with the help of NASCAR racer Joey Logano; and a Walther LP53 air pistol, whose seller claims was used in the James Bond film From Russia with Love.
428	23	"Pawn Brothers"	January 20, 2016
Items appraised include a 1958 Jim Henson puppet; a 1965 Schwinn bicycle; a John Belushi autograph, whose seller was an extra in The Blues Brothers; and an 1894-S Barber dime.
429	24	"Longshot Pawn"	January 27, 2016
Items appraised include a Victorian-era lithograph; a rare Nepalese Bira gun; a 1970s Trans World Airlines mural by Bob Peak; and an antique three-trumpet brass horn.
430	25	"Legends of Rock"	February 3, 2016
Items appraised include a customized guitar painted and owned by Phil Collen of Def Leppard; an original set of advertisement slides for Mogen David; a pair of shoes signed by Cleveland Cavaliers forward LeBron James; and a 19th-century French brass carriage clock. As a special surprise, Rick's guitar expert Jesse brings in Collen and Def Leppard's singer, Joe Elliott, to confirm if the guitar was owned by Collen.
431	26	"Lock, Stock and Pawn"	February 10, 2016
Items appraised include a 1978 Woody Woodpecker oil painting; a 19th-century Hobbs & Co. lock box; a bench made up of all-star Brooklyn and Los Angeles Dodgers memorabilia; and a first edition set of the Delphian Course. Also, Rick gets the idea to create an app of his own after Chumlee quizzes him with a trivia app.
432	27	"No Pawn for You!"	February 17, 2016
Items appraised include a script for the final episode of Seinfeld signed by the entire cast; a collection of antique firefighting buckets; a vintage Donkey Kong arcade game; and a chair whose seller claims belonged to Abraham Lincoln.
433	28	"First Lady of Pawn"	February 24, 2016
Items appraised include a rare copy of The Five Sharps' recording of "Stormy Weather"; a 1927 Essex Sedan rat rod car; wrestling manager Paul Bearer's WWE Hall of Fame ring, which was presented to his family following his posthumous induction into the Hall of Fame in 2014; and an 1891 silver certificate with Martha Washington's portrait on it.
434	29	"Blockbuster Buys"	March 30, 2016
This retrospective episode spotlights some of the most expensive items appraised on the show, including: the 1915 Panama-Pacific $50 gold coin from Season 12's "Party On, Pawn"; the water-propelled jetpack from Season 12's "Promissory Pawn"; the two Keith Haring drawings from Season 9's "Daddy's Girl"; and the limited edition 2014 Hertz Penske GT Mustang from Season 12's "Racing Revolution".
435	30	"Gangsters, Guns and Guitars"	April 6, 2016
This retrospective episode spotlights some of the notable guns, guitars, and gangster memorabilia appraised on the show, including: Phil Collen's hand-painted guitar from Season 12's "Legends of Rock"; Lucky Luciano's heirloom ring from Season 5's "Ring Around a Rockne"; the 1890s octagon barrel .22 caliber Winchester rifle from Season 6's "Love Me Spender"; the 1969 Les Paul Professional guitar from Season 9's "Sleeping Giant"; the 1894 Marlin rifle from Season 9's "Choo Choo Chum"; and the Carlo Gambino signed check from Season 3's "Wise Guys".
436	31	"Deals on Wheels"	April 20, 2016
This retrospective episode spotlights some of the notable vehicles appraised on the show, including: the 1949 Hudson Commodore from Season 7's "Man. Make. Fire."; the Ultra4 race car from Season 11's "Rick's Roulette"; the G30 Chevrolet camper, which was converted into a post-apocalyptic survival vehicle, from Season 10's "Pawn Apocalypse"; the 1880s doctor's buggy from Season 3's "Darth Pawn"; the 1927 Essex Sedan rat rod from Season 12's "First Lady of Pawn"; and the five-speed custom sand rail, which Rick purchased for $18,500 in Season 5's "Looney Dunes" and later sold to one of his regular customers, Davey Deals, for $8,000 and an ancient samurai sword in Season 8's "The Amazing Chumlee".
437	32	"One in a Million"	April 27, 2016
This retrospective episode spotlights some of the rarest items appraised on the show, including: the 1969 Hot Wheels prototype Beach Bomb Volkswagen bus from Season 11's "Hot Wheel of Fortune"; the Revolutionary War officer's commission from Season 4's "Sub for Sale"; Nikola Tesla's original 1887 prototype AC motor from Season 5's "High Tops"; the 1979 Boba Fett prototype action figure from Season 12's "The Pawn Awakens"; the Nepalese Bira gun from Season 12's "Longshot Pawn"; and Harry Houdini's handcuffs from the eponymous Season 3 episode.
438	33	"Every Rose Has Its Pawn"	May 4, 2016
Items appraised include an original sketch of the Marine Corps War Memorial; an ancient Roman duck oil lamp; a Poison platinum album presented to Bret Michaels, who helps Rick appraise the album as a special surprise; and a $20 military payment certificate from the Vietnam War.
439	34	"Rick the Emperor"	May 11, 2016
Items appraised include a 44 BC Roman coin bearing Julius Caesar's portrait; a plaster cast of Joe DiMaggio's feet, whose seller's uncle was DiMaggio's foot doctor; a handmade leather jacket made by East West Musical Instruments; and a scarlet fever warning sign.
440	35	"Pawning Pistols"	May 18, 2016
Items appraised include an 1896 bar of Yellow Kid soap; two brass duck-foot-shaped pistols; a Victorian-era hand crank device; and a $1 certificate from the Southern Orphan Association.
441	36	"Stairway to Pawn"	May 25, 2016
Items appraised include a bass guitar signed by John Entwistle of The Who and John Paul Jones of Led Zeppelin; an 1867 proof Shield nickel; and a talking Herman Munster doll.
442	37	"Pawntucky Derby"	June 8, 2016
Items appraised include a 1910 Reynolds envelope sealer; a 1942 Moby Dick comic book; a 1980s Sigma Derby horse racing game, which Chumlee becomes addicted to; and a 1935 silver certificate signed by Walt Disney and Ronald Reagan.
443	38	"Astro-Pawn"	June 15, 2016
Items appraised include a Civil War-era colonel's sword; an 1800s veterinary medicine box; a pin from the 1936 Summer Olympics; two 1960s toy robots; and an antique oil lamp.
444	39	"Pawn of Liberty"	June 22, 2016
Items appraised include a surfboard that was pictured on two of The Beach Boys' album covers; a copy of Mark Twain's first feature in The Atlantic Monthly; an antique spirit hydrometer; and a painting of the Statue of Liberty by Peter Max.
445	40	"G.I. Pawn"	June 29, 2016
Items appraised include two 1980s G.I. Joe playsets; a framed photo and letter signed by Henry Wadsworth Longfellow; a staff uniform from the 1984 Summer Olympics; a 1926 Black+Decker drill; and a 1957 Chang Jiang motorcycle.
446	41	"Trash or Treasure"	June 29, 2016
This retrospective episode spotlights some of the most notable items that were deemed either fake or genuine on the show, including: the 1763 Stradivarius violin from Season 3's "Darth Pawn"; the John Hancock document from Season 4's "Honor Thy Father"; the Pablo Picasso lithograph from Season 7's "Funny Money"; the 1894-S Barber dime from Season 12's "Pawn Brothers"; John Wesley Hardin's business card from Season 4's "Face the Music"; and the unopened antique chest from Season 1's "Old Man's Booty".
447	42	"Napoleon Complex"	July 6, 2016
Items appraised include a surreal figure by Pedro Friedeberg; a Monkees talking hand puppet; a framed 1809 letter signed by Napoleon Bonaparte; and an original Dick and Jane illustration painting.
448	43	"Rocking Restoration"	July 6, 2016
This retrospective episode spotlights items from some of the most notable restorations done for the shop, including: the ancient samurai sword from Season 7's "The Last Samurai"; the 1973 Jeep CJ5 from Season 3's "The Eagle Has Landed"; the 1930s Gottlieb grip tester from Season 11's "Penny for Your Pawn"; the 1930s tricycle from Season 11's "Behind the Wheel"; and the 1992 crashed Schweizer 300C helicopter from Season 2's "Chopper Gamble".
449	44	"Famous Finds"	July 13, 2016
This retrospective episode spotlights some of the most famous items appraised on the show, including: the 1970s vinyl LP of Bob Dylan's album, Self Portrait, from Season 3's "Like a Rolling Chum"; the 1963 Baseball Hall of Fame bust molds of John McGraw and Joe DiMaggio from Season 6's "Thirty Something"; the 1745 book printed by Benjamin Franklin from Season 4's "Kings and McQueens"; James Brown's jumpsuit and boots from Season 12's "Godfather of Pawn", the NASA Gemini spacecraft launch photo from Season 4's "Take a Seat"; and the 1932 NFL Playoff Game program from Season 6's "Corey's Big Burn".
450	45	"Hollywood Goods"	July 20, 2016
This retrospective episode spotlights some of the most notable Hollywood items appraised on the show, including: Marilyn Monroe's termination letter from Season 9's "You Snooze, You Lose"; the life-size figure of the Creature from the Black Lagoon from Season 11's "Pawn Creature"; Steve McQueen's 1951 Chevrolet convertible from Season 8's "Colt to the Touch"; the 1960s Paul Newman photo collection from Season 10's "Hiding Houdini"; the Cleopatra prop shield from Season 10's "Generation Gap"; and the Indiana Jones whip from Season 1's "John Hancock's Hancock".

=== Season 13 (2016–17) ===
No. overall	No. in season	Title	Original release date
451	1	"Mad Deals"	July 27, 2016
Items appraised include a copy of Mad #1; a 1969 Triumph Trophy motorcycle; and an 1800s Parker Bros. shotgun.
452	2	"Pawn No Evil"	August 3, 2016
Items appraised include a painting with a message on the back revealing Glenn Ford's love affair with Marilyn Monroe; a Japanese animatronic "No evil" monkey; a Chinese Ming dynasty Kuan banknote; and an 1870s wooden oil barrel.
453	3	"Pawn Halen"	August 10, 2016
Items appraised include two 1814 naval history books from John Adams' personal library; a cigar box guitar signed by Sammy Hagar; and a 1901 coin sorter. Also, Rick goes to see his restored sulky, which he purchased for $900 in the Season 12 episode "Pawn in the USA".
454	4	"Civil War Treasures"	August 17, 2016
This retrospective episode spotlights some of the most notable Civil War items appraised on the show, including: the Smith carbine rifle from Season 7's "Corey, I Am Your Father"; the 1860 Abraham Lincoln campaign ribbon from Season 3's "Honest Abe"; the 1850s sterling silver flask from Season 2's "Message in a Bottle"; the lapdesk made by Samuel Mudd from Season 8's "Lost in Spacelander"; the Battle of Cross Keys pocket watch from Season 6's "Jet Setters"; the 1864 Lincoln campaign poster from Season 9's "Saddle Up"; and the Civil War-era math book from Season 9's "New Old Man".
455	5	"Double Your Pawn"	August 24, 2016
Items appraised include an 1800s railroad equilibristat; a movie poster for the 1956 film The Hunchback of Notre Dame; an antique Wrigley gum vending machine; Western film star Harry Carey's collection of celebrity autographs; and a Jimmy Jet flight simulator, which Chumlee wants to keep for himself.
456	6	"Pops Pawn"	August 24, 2016
Items appraised include an antique Persian armillary sphere; a signed Louis Armstrong photo and handkerchief; a Smarties candy dispenser; and a vintage Ghirardelli Chocolate Company billboard, which sparks an argument between Rick and Chumlee over the pronunciation of the company's name.
457	7	"Death and Taxidermy"	August 31, 2016
Items appraised include a 1547 copy of Danse Macabre; an 1889 inclinometer; two sculptures from Dr. Seuss' unorthodox taxidermy collection; and a 1925 tear gas baton, which Corey rejects as it has the possibility of shooting a shotgun shell, making the baton illegal.
458	8	"Triple Axel Pawn"	August 31, 2016
Items appraised include two 1700s steelyard scales; a custom Fender quad guitar built for Noel Boggs, which is brought in by his daughter; a Wheaties cereal box featuring and signed by figure skater Tonya Harding; and an 1880 $50 bill and an 1890 $20 bill.
459	9	"Cowboys and Cannons"	September 7, 2016
Items appraised include a 19th-century sundial cannon; a roller skating helmet from the 1980 film Heaven's Gate, signed by a number of the cast and crew members, and which was owned by the seller's father, who owned the skating rink that was featured in the movie; a 1964 Beatles board game; and a collection of sterling silver baby figurines.
460	10	"Great Negotiations"	September 7, 2016
This retrospective episode spotlights items from some of the most notable negotiations between customers and the Harrisons seen on the show, including: Elton John's boots from Season 8's "London Pawning"; the toy car replica of James Bond's 1965 Aston Martin DB5 from Season 8's "Secret Agent Man"; the 44 BC Julius Caesar coin from Season 12's "Rick the Emperor"; the Pez dispenser collection from Season 2's "Pezzed Off"; the 1546 book that belonged to Isaac Newton from Season 3's "Put Up Your Dukes"; the Viking copper and gold collection from Season 9's "Purple Haze"; and the Mark Twain aphorism, which Rick purchased for $8,500 in Season 7's "I Herd That" and later sold to Katie Couric for $12,000 in Season 8's "Chum-parazzi".
461	11	"Smokin' Pawn"	October 24, 2016
Items appraised include a 1944 steel penny; an 1850s perpetual calendar clock; a limited edition H. R. Giger book with an Alien 3 lithograph; and a Smokey Bear hand puppet.
462	12	"Pawn in Space"	October 31, 2016
Items appraised include a Lost in Space helmet signed by the entire cast; a William Tolliday goldsmith piece; an antique hay harpoon; and a pair of shoes owned and signed by NBA center Robert Parish.
463	13	"Hidden Pawn"	November 14, 2016
Items appraised include a 1769 playing card with a political message printed on the back; a 2002 KTM 690 Duke motorcycle owned by Dennis Hopper; an antique stained glass lamp shade; and three unopened Charlie's Angels figurines.
464	14	"All Pawns on Deck"	November 21, 2016
Items appraised include two 1739 engravings by John Pine depicting the Spanish Armada being defeated by the British Navy in 1588; a 1980s Coca-Cola can toy robot; an antique Teddy Roosevelt Bears pitcher; and a set of 1890s phonograph cylinders that represent the earliest known surviving examples of sexually explicit phonograph home recordings.
465	15	"Locked Up and Rail Roaded"	November 28, 2016
Items appraised include two antique padlocks from the Denver and Rio Grande Western Railroad; a 1950 Chrysler Town & Country Newport car; a cubist painting by Louise Henderson; and an antique self-heating iron.
466	16	"Silver Stash Pawn"	December 5, 2016
Items appraised include an antique German lithophane lamp shade; an ancient Egyptian mummy mask; a 1950 The Adventures of Bob Hope comic book; a 1959 fire extinguisher from Disneyland; and an 1885 Morgan dollar from the Binion Hoard.
467	17	"Gotham Pawn"	December 12, 2016
Items appraised include a sculpture by M.L. Snowden, which Rick takes a liking to, but which Corey and Chumlee criticize; two Batman guitars made by John Bolin, who is sent by Rick's guitar expert Jesse to appraise the guitars; two badges from the Odd Fellows; two letters by Betty Crocker addressed to the seller's grandmother; and an Adolf Hitler pincushion.
468	18	"Pawn Another Day"	December 26, 2016
Items appraised include a locket with a portrait miniature of Henry Ward Beecher; an egg-shaped chair made by Starkey Hearing Technologies; an antique phrenology head; a salesman sample of a Mammoth Fair organ; and Madonna's 1988 day planner.
469	19	"Four Score and Seven Pawns"	December 26, 2016
Items appraised include an 1870s Colt revolver; an antique counterfeit coin scale; a life mask of Abraham Lincoln by Leonard Volk; an antique Chinese fingernail guard; and a Playboy magazine used in the 1994 film Forrest Gump.
470	20	"A Pawn of Lies"	January 1, 2017
Items appraised include two original lithographs by M. C. Escher; a miniature replica of a Wells Fargo stagecoach; a Russian bone record of the song "Istanbul (Not Constantinople)"; and an antique electronic lie detector.
471	21	"My Country, Pawn of Thee"	January 2, 2017
Items appraised include a document with handwritten lyrics to the song "My Country, 'Tis of Thee" by Samuel Francis Smith; an 1800s vanity set; a 1950s Space Explorer tin toy; the sign bell from the El Rancho Hotel and Casino; and a United Nations helmet from the Unified Task Force.
472	22	"Killer Pawn"	January 2, 2017
Items appraised include an early 1900s Millionaire calculator; a 1950s Russian night vision scope; a shower curtain autographed by Anthony Perkins, who played Norman Bates in the 1960 film Psycho; and two $500 bills: an 1882 gold certificate, and a 1918 Federal Reserve Note.
473	23	"Megawatt Money"	January 16, 2017
Items appraised include a first edition copy of T. S. Eliot's Four Quartets; a 1965 Battle of the Bulge board game, which inspires Chumlee to create his own board game; a 1920s radium crock; and two Kill Bill swords signed by David Carradine, who played Bill in both films.
474	24	"Seven Barreled Pawn"	January 16, 2017
Items appraised include a 1940s doctor's blood sugar testing kit; a limited edition etching by Joan Miró; a rare seven-barreled Nock volley gun originally made for the Napoleonic Wars; and an early 1900s hand crank pasta cutter.
475	25	"Wound Up Rick"	January 23, 2017
Items appraised include a collection of vintage whistles; an antique Self Winding clock; a Led Zeppelin record signed by the entire band; a collection of sales tax tokens; and an original Doonesbury cartoon by Garry Trudeau.
476	26	"Cutting Edge Pawn"	January 23, 2017
Items appraised include a collection of Jean-Michel Basquiat postcards; a 1969 Hydrocycle Barracuda watercraft fitted with a motor; a 1700s pewter tankard; a Minnequa flax water bag; and a 1913 blueprint copy machine.
477	27	"Pawn Patent"	January 30, 2017
Items appraised include an old address book with a notecard signed by Edwin Hubble; an 1858 self-lighting/extinguishing lantern, whose seller claims is a patent model; an 1871 Martini–Henry short lever rifle; and an 1865 Starrett food chopper. Also, Chumlee tries to come up with a way to make money off of his name and even goes as far to start charging Rick and Corey to say his name.
478	28	"Houston, We Have a Deal"	January 30, 2017
Items appraised include a salesman sample kit from Youngstown Steel Kitchens; a lunar Bible; a briefcase filled with German currency from the early 1900s; a disintegrator gun from the TV series Buck Rogers in the 25th Century; and an original Beetle Bailey print by Mort Walker.
479	29	"Under Pressure"	February 6, 2017
Items appraised include a 1950s Buddy Lee doll; a self-portrait by The Beatles member John Lennon; a collection of 1940s furnace safety glasses; a menu from an 1876 dinner to honor Senator William Sharon; and a vintage Rolex water pressure tester.

=== Season 14 (2017) ===
No. overall	No. in season	Title	Original release date
480	1	"Pawns Ahoy!"	April 10, 2017
Items appraised include an 1800s pegleg converted into a gun; a collection of 1940s high school yearbooks signed by James Dean, which belonged to the seller's neighbor; and a Beanie Baby commemorating the death of Princess Diana.
481	2	"Pawnball Wizard"	April 10, 2017
Items appraised include a 1977 Captain Fantastic pinball machine; a uranium glass decanter; a painting of John F. Kennedy's 45th birthday celebration by LeRoy Neiman; and a collection of 1700s British stamps, one of which is from the 1765 Stamp Act.
482	3	"Oh Holy Pawn!"	April 17, 2017
Items appraised include an original page from the Gutenberg Bible; a 1946 Ziegfeld Follies movie poster; a 1930s Roto Gage stamp viewer; and an antique wire-measuring machine.
483	4	"Buddy, Can You Spare a Thousand?"	April 17, 2017
Items appraised include a 1934 $1,000 star note; a World War II-era Navy gun scope; a bronze burial statue from the Ming dynasty, which turns out to actually be a griffin; and an original storyboard piece from the 1966 TV special How the Grinch Stole Christmas! signed by Chuck Jones.
484	5	"Spider Pawn"	April 24, 2017
Items appraised include a 1700 atlas; an original 1977 The Amazing Spider-Man comic strip signed by Stan Lee and John Romita Sr., which Chumlee and the seller bring to a nearby comics convention to have it authenticated by Lee himself; an antique rotary phone; and a 1930s prototype Zippo lighter.
485	6	"Up Up and Away!"	April 24, 2017
Items appraised include a Superman costume worn by Christopher Reeve in the 1978 film Superman: The Movie, along with a green kryptonite crystal from the movie; a 1980s Commodore 64 computer; two 1960s concert posters featuring Johnny Cash and James Brown; and a vintage Rhodes Mark V piano.
486	7	"Pawnfamous"	May 8, 2017
Items appraised include a bronze statue of NFL running back O. J. Simpson, which is brought in by rapstar Flavor Flav; a 1948 letter signed by Winston Churchill; a cocktail shaker presented to Chicago Cubs owner Philip K. Wrigley in 1935; a 1905 Chicago Tribune article, which talks about Theodore Roosevelt's "war on foul football"; and a customized 1951 Mercury car.
487	8	"Gilded Pawn Age"	May 8, 2017
Items appraised include a Nintendo toy race car track; an 1802 edition of The Federalist Papers; and a Batman and Superman giclée print. Also, Rick attempts to help his friend Derek sell a line of train cars from the Gilded Age era.
488	9	"Pawning Reagan"	May 15, 2017
Items appraised include an autographed photo of Laurel and Hardy; an 1800s Chambers double-lock musket; a Ronald Reagan foam head from the 1980 Republican National Convention; and an antique snuff mull made of ram's horn.
489	10	"Thar She Pawns!"	May 15, 2017
Items appraised include two whaling harpoons from 1849 and 1853; a 1974 Triumph Spitfire convertible; a book and lithograph signed by David Alfaro Siqueiros; and four Popeye water pistols.
490	11	"La La Land"	May 22, 2017
Rick travels to Los Angeles looking to buy some items for the shop. Items that catch his attention include a collection of props from the 1971 film Willy Wonka & the Chocolate Factory; three letters by Muhammad Ali; a signed painting by Leonardo DiCaprio; and a bust mold of Bruce Lee. Back at Gold & Silver, items appraised include a medal commemorating the Centennial Exposition; a 1979 R22 Robinson prop helicopter; and a 1920s glass butter churn.
491	12	"The Pawnshine State"	June 5, 2017
Rick and Chumlee travel to Florida looking to buy a boat to sell to one of their clients, so they check out a 1964 Rybovich yacht. They also visit a friend of theirs, Lisa's, pawn shop, and she shows them a Florida Highwaymen painting, before Rick takes her out to appraise a voting booth from the 2000 United States presidential election. Back at Gold & Silver, Corey appraises a collection of original The Incredible Hulk comic books.
492	13	"By Land or by Seep"	June 5, 2017
Items appraised include a 1934 copy of Lysistrata, illustrated by Pablo Picasso; a 1942 amphibious Ford Army Jeep; and two ThunderCats toys.
493	14	"Balloon Payments"	June 12, 2017
Items appraised include a 1977 Ronald McDonald balloon inflator; a Tomak kris; a Civil War photo of what the seller claims is the Wentz house in Gettysburg; a 1900 RCA Records inkwell; and a collection of Native American prints by Edward S. Curtis.
494	15	"Lock, Stock and Two Nickel Barrels"	June 12, 2017
Items appraised include a 1930 combination poster for The Big Trail and the Union Pacific Railroad; a 1975 radio-controlled helicopter; a vintage tuxedo owned by magician Jack Kodell; and two 1840s nickel-plated pistols. Also, Corey challenges Rick and Chumlee to a drone race.
495	16	"Declaration of Dopeness"	June 26, 2017
Items appraised include a Civil War-era Sharps "coffee-grinder" carbine; a William J. Stone copy of the Declaration of Independence; a Mike McGill skateboard signed by the cast of Dogtown and Z-Boys (and later McGill himself when he visits the shop to authenticate it); and a 1933 World's Fair doll.
496	17	"Frontier Fortune"	June 26, 2017
Items appraised include a 1930s Gibson lap steel guitar; an antique forged padlock; a collection of Oregon Trail Memorial half dollars, along with a 1928 letter by Ezra Meeker; a Victorian-era snuff box and matches; and a set of 1700s bone dice.
497	18	"PokePawn"	July 10, 2017
Items appraised include a collection of Pokémon Charizard cards; a 1926 Dunhill watch lighter; an 1826 medal commemorating the completion of the Erie Canal; and a 1791 copy of Adam Smith's The Wealth of Nations.
498	19	"Masonic Pawn"	July 10, 2017
Items appraised include an 1856 patent model steamer; a hat said to be the one worn by Prince on the cover of his 1992 single "My Name Is Prince"; a World War II-era bisque pottery chia planter; an Egyptian scarab ring said to be from the Eighteenth Dynasty of Egypt; and a Masonic apron worn by George Washington.
499	20	"Pawn Samurai"	July 17, 2017
Items appraised include three samurai swords, which Chumlee buys for $3,850 without authenticating; a collection of 1880s thank-you notes addressed to a Chicago drug dealer; an antique Steiff donkey pull toy; and a British World War I propaganda poster.
500	21	"Pawned at the Stake"	July 17, 2017
Items appraised include a 1716 copy of Matthew Hale's A Tryal of Witches; a gold-plated banjo manufactured by Frederick J. Bacon; and a Boeing plane steering wheel. Also, Rick goes to see the restored 1976 AMC Pacer from Wayne's World, which he purchased for $9,500 in the Season 12 episode "Party On, Pawn".
501	22	"Mini Miles"	July 24, 2017
Items appraised include a 1959 #1 Barbie doll, which is brought in by Marie Osmond's hair and makeup artist, and which Rick appraises before attending a show featuring Osmond; a 1950s amusement park car; a 1900 $10,000 gold certificate; and a Citizen Kane production still autographed by Orson Welles.
502	23	"Dollars & Dunks"	July 24, 2017
Items appraised include a Los Angeles Lakers warm-up jersey worn and signed by Kobe Bryant during the 2010 NBA Finals; a signed first edition copy of John O'Brien's Leaving Las Vegas; an antique hussar tomahawk; and a 1909 tabletop toaster.
503	24	"Business is Brewing"	July 31, 2017
Items appraised include a 1929 McCormick Farmall Regular tractor; an antique beer barrel and alcohol meter, which Rick brings to his friend Peter Zien at AleSmith Brewing Company in San Diego for authentication, and during which Rick creates his own beer; a clapperboard from the 2012 film Django Unchained, signed by the cast and director Quentin Tarantino; and a print of Cassius Marcellus Coolidge's Dogs Playing Poker.
504	25	"Great Scott!"	July 31, 2017
Items appraised include a Clark & Sherrard pistol from the Civil War; three comic books from the 1950s and 1960s, one of which is the first issue of Dennis the Menace; a 1973 Marshall amplifier; and a Back to the Future Part II hoverboard signed by some of the cast members.
505	26	"Stamp Stumped"	August 7, 2017
Items appraised include an 1838 Gobrecht dollar and an 1857 double eagle $20 gold coin; an Exodus album sleeve signed by Bob Marley; a Civil War-era concertina; a 1968 Milton Bradley Win-A-Card game; and three North Dakota drug tax stamps.
506	27	"The Greatest Pawn on Earth!"	August 7, 2017
Items appraised include a 1966 Dodge Charger car fitted with a hemi engine; a sword from the Napoleonic era; and an 1874 edition of P. T. Barnum's autobiography.
507	28	"If the Pawn Don't Fit"	August 14, 2017
Items appraised include a set of Allan Adler silverware; a Star Wars comic book signed by Harrison Ford, Mark Hamill, and Carrie Fisher; a 1993 Ford Bronco SUV said to be the getaway vehicle from the infamous O. J. Simpson car chase prior to his murder trial; an ancient Greek coin; an antique gold scale used by Goldfield Consolidated Mines; an antique flintlock blunderbuss pistol; and an 1886 Tisdell & Whittelsey detective camera.
508	29	"King of Pawntus"	August 28, 2017
Items appraised include an ancient Roman coin bearing Mithridates VI's portrait; a 1967 Fiat 500 car; an autographed Reservoir Dogs movie poster; and a replica toy car from the TV show The Beverly Hillbillies.
509	30	"Money to Pawn"	August 28, 2017
Items appraised include a misprinted 1974 dollar bill with the $20 design on the front and the $10 design on the back; a 1930s spark plug cleaner, which is brought in by Rick's vehicle expert Bob; a copy of The Art of Animation signed by Walt Disney; and a Spirit of Ecstasy hood ornament.

=== Season 15 (2017–18) ===
No. overall	No. in season	Title	Original release date
510	1	"Going, Going...Pawn!"	October 16, 2017
Items appraised include a model of fashion designer Ralph Lauren's Bugatti 57SC; two religious reliefs sculpted by Salvador Dalí; and a World War I-era surgeon's kit. Also, Rick travels to Los Angeles to check out a baseball bat said to be the one from Babe Ruth's called shot during Game 3 of the 1932 World Series.
511	2	"Et tu, Rick?"	October 16, 2017
Items appraised include an ancient denarius; a 1924 door knocker from Metro-Goldwyn-Mayer Studios; an Alamo Scouts patch from World War II; and a 1979 Mad Max movie poster.
512	3	"Pawn or Bust"	October 23, 2017
Items appraised include a bust of Marlon Brando; a print of a "Grandpa Cyclopes" by Mark Mothersbaugh of Devo; an unopened 1980s Donkey Kong penny bank; and a signed cabinet card of Buffalo Bill.
513	4	"Chum's Risky Business"	October 23, 2017
Items appraised include two $5 chief notes and a $10 bison note; a large collection of 1970s comic books, which Chumlee buys for $500 before going through all of them; an 1850s gasogene; and an antique pinball game.
514	5	"E Equals MC Pawn"	October 30, 2017
Items appraised include a handwritten math scripture by Albert Einstein; a 1930s headlamp tester; a Chucky toy prop from the 1988 film Child's Play; and a sterling silver pill case owned by Carole Lombard.
515	6	"Wish-a-Pawn a Star"	October 30, 2017
Items appraised include three Disneyland ride operator costumes; a 1950 "Smoking Hamilton" $10 bill; a 1960s Space Patrol toy car; and a World War II painting by Benton Henderson Clark.
516	7	"Samurais and Centerfolds"	November 6, 2017
Items appraised include a 16th-century katana; two ancient Aegean turtle coins; a 1984 Playboy stock certificate, which is brought in by a former Playboy photographer, and which Corey buys for $400 on the condition he and Chumlee get invited to a Playboy party; and a pack of Gomer Pyle bubble gum cards.
517	8	"The Pawn Commandments"	November 6, 2017
Items appraised include an antique magician automaton, which is brought in by Murray SawChuck's showroom manager; a 1583 copy of the Geneva Bible; a 1930s Rock-Ola horse racing game; and a collection of insignia signs from the 390th Strategic Missile Wing.
518	9	"Royally Pawned"	November 13, 2017
Items appraised include a suit of royal British armor; a 1957 Les Paul Gibson guitar customized for the 2006 US Open; a 1920s Scottish penny weight scale; and an Abbott and Costello autograph, along with a copy of the script to Abbott and Costello Go to Mars.
519	10	"Pawnie and Clyde"	November 13, 2017
Items appraised include a collection of original production drawings from the 1959 Disney animated film Sleeping Beauty, which is brought in by actor/mixed martial artist Randy Couture; an 1866 Milton Bradley The Checkered Game of Life; a 1930s dry gold sluice; the handwritten prison memoir manuscript of Blanche Barrow, which is the only written account of the original Bonnie and Clyde gang; and two vintage Sahara Hotel and Casino door handles.
520	11	"Top Rope, Bottom Dollar"	November 20, 2017
Items appraised include a 17th-century powder flask; a 1652 copy of Elias Ashmole's Theatrum Chemicum Britannicum; an 1875 half-dollar said to be shot by Annie Oakley; and an autographed costume owned by wrestler Randy Savage.
521	12	"The Devil Went Down to Vegas"	November 20, 2017
Items appraised include a World War II-era bicycle; an 1850s Lenzkirch mantle clock; a fiddle signed by Charlie Daniels; and a 1920s miner's self-rescuer.
522	13	"Revolutionary Rick!"	January 22, 2018
Rick travels to Washington, D.C. to check out a set of spoons made by Paul Revere and a three-piece suit worn by George Washington. The three-piece suit is revealed to be valued at up to $3 million, and Rick offers $2 million for the suit, but the seller is adamant at $2.5 million. If a deal had been made, this would have been the first-ever million-dollar deal made on the show. Back at Gold & Silver, items appraised include a ceramic flamingo figurine that was handed out by Bugsy Siegel during the grand opening of the Flamingo Las Vegas in 1946 and a talking candle prop from the 1969 children's TV show H.R. Pufnstuf.
523	14	"Series Rings and Rap Kings"	January 22, 2018
Items appraised include a framed print by Marc Chagall; a first edition copy of Ken Kesey's One Flew Over the Cuckoo's Nest; a 2013 World Series Boston Red Sox ring; and a 1996 BMW said to be the one that rapstar Tupac Shakur was murdered in.
524	15	"Can't Pawn Me Love"	January 29, 2018
Items appraised include a collection of original illustrations from Maurice Sendak's Where the Wild Things Are; a large collection of vintage Beatles vinyl albums; a vintage hot dog cooker and bun toaster, which Chumlee later uses to host a cookout for the staff; and a Princess Leia action figure signed by Carrie Fisher.
525	16	"Some Serious Coinage"	January 29, 2018
Items appraised include two rare coins: a 1792 half disme and a 1781 Libertas Americana medal; a 1963 The Jetsons lunchbox; a 1920s Steyr automobile hood ornament; and a 1620 copy of Via Vitae Aeternae.
526	17	"Ultimate Fighting Pawn"	February 5, 2018
Items appraised include an 1880s penny-farthing; an 1898 Blüthner grand piano; and a limited edition Sony Walkman. Also, Rick's samurai sword expert Mike visits the shop to present the Harrisons with a fully restored 1600s katana, which Rick sent to Japan to be restored two years earlier. Upon seeing the sword, Rick states he wants to put it up for display only, which Corey objects to. Later, Ultimate Fighting Championship CEO Dana White visits the shop looking to add to his weapon collection, and Corey and Chumlee sell him a collection of swords for a total of $60,000, including the 1600s katana behind Rick's back.
527	18	"The Happiest Place to Pawn"	February 5, 2018
Items appraised include an anti-Vietnam War pamphlet signed by Martin Luther King Jr., which is brought in by Rick's historical document expert Stuart; a radio-controlled Jungle Cruise boat from the Disneyland Hotel, which requires a test floating; a Pour le Mérite medal from World War I; and a 1955 Nikon camera.
528	19	"President's Day Sale"	February 19, 2018
Items appraised include an original Abraham Lincoln parlor card; a golf driver shaft designed for Bill Clinton; a check signed by James Madison; and an 1872 patent model of an American flag press.
529	20	"Fully Vested"	February 19, 2018
Items appraised include two 1700s British breechloader pistols, whose test firing is made into a marksmanship competition between Rick and Corey; a harmonica vest worn by Blues Traveler musician John Popper; and a glass art piece by Paul Joseph Stankard. Also, Popper himself visits the shop and sells Chumlee one of his harmonicas (as well as a harmonica lesson) for $50.
530	21	"A Killer Cap"	February 26, 2018
Items appraised include a top hat and pistol owned by Francis Tumblety; an antique time clock; a limited edition Face to Face board game, along with the documentation of the game's rights, which include a number of celebrity signatures, and are brought in by the game's creator; and a vintage leaded glass gnome table lamp.
531	22	"Blades of Deal"	February 26, 2018
Items appraised include a 1984 Ferrari 308 GTS car; a 1939 Shyvers multiphone; a cowboy hat owned by Larry Hagman; and a Vegas Golden Knights jersey signed by goalie Marc-André Fleury. Rick surprises the seller by having Fleury himself authenticate the jersey. Fleury also teaches Chumlee how to be a hockey goalie.
532	23	"Pawned and Confused"	March 5, 2018
Items appraised include a collection of Led Zeppelin vinyl albums; an 1885 Wooton desk; and a base from Game 2 of the 2016 World Series. Also, after appraising the Led Zeppelin albums, Rick tries to find an odd black statue that was featured in the artwork of the band's 1976 album Presence, with the help of his Hollywood memorabilia expert, Warwick. During his search, he buys a collection of Led Zeppelin photos for $3,100.
533	24	"In the Presence of Greatness"	March 5, 2018
Items appraised include an unopened 1966 Batman utility belt; a 1960s Mosrite guitar, which is brought in by country singer Nikki Lane; and a sketchbook autographed by 41 comic book artists. Also, Rick continues his search for the Led Zeppelin mystery object from the previous episode, and eventually finds and buys one for $3,700.
534	25	"Highly Explosive Pawn"	April 23, 2018
Items appraised include an autographed sports almanac cover from the 1989 film Back to the Future Part II, which is authenticated by the series' prop master; a 1900 Antikamnia calendar; Merle Haggard's "The Fightin' Side of Me" belt; and a British Navy powder bucket.
535	26	"Payne in the Putt"	April 30, 2018
Rick returns to Washington, D.C. to check out a fully restored 1944 Willys MB Jeep and a 1624 first edition book on the elixir of life. Back at Gold & Silver, items appraised include an antique Darlot magic lantern projector; a 1950s gumball machine; and an autographed tailor-made pair of knickers owned by golfer Payne Stewart.
536	27	"Here's Looking at You, Pawn!"	May 7, 2018
Items appraised include a 1911 first American edition copy of J. M. Barrie's Peter and Wendy; an original 1942 Casablanca movie poster; a kneeling thepphanom statue; and a piece of scrap metal from the USS Shenandoah.
537	28	"The Pistol is Mightier Than the Sword"	May 14, 2018
Items appraised include a 1700s pistol sword; a portrait of theater actor John Barrymore by James Montgomery Flagg; a 19th-century marine chronometer; and a 1969 Harley-Davidson Aermacchi motorcycle.
538	29	"Big Fish in a Small Pawn"	May 21, 2018
Items appraised include three San Francisco 49ers Championship rings from Super Bowls XVI, XXIII, and XXIX; a four-barrel speargun, which Corey rejects, as it is considered a modern-day firearm, but which his weapons expert Alex shows an interest in buying, as he has a license to buy modern-day firearms; a pair of 18th-century pattens; and an 1891 cast-iron model of the Trader's Bank Building in Toronto.
539	30	"A Treasure Remembered"	June 27, 2018
Following the death of patriarch Richard Benjamin Harrison, the cast offers tribute to the Old Man in this retrospective episode featuring clips of some of his most memorable moments.

=== Season 16 (2019) ===
No. overall	No. in season	Title	Original release date
540	1	"Pawn it Out of the Park"	January 21, 2019
Items appraised include an 1862 copy of The Bar-Tender's Guide; an autographed 1951 Mickey Mantle rookie card; an antique boat motor; a 1985 Rambo lunchbox and thermos; and an antique fire truck pedal car. Also, Rick travels to the East Coast to look at a 1763 Dutch East India Company cannon, a matched pair of 1697 signal cannons, and two three-barrel tea caddy pistols.
541	2	"Triple Crown Pawn"	January 28, 2019
Items appraised include two Italian movie posters for Easy Rider and Dirty Harry; a Civil War dog tag; an Eva Zeisel four-piece pottery set; a 1950s cast-iron pony cart ride, which Rick buys for $450 and has Rick Dale restore as a decorative piece for Chumlee's candy shop; a Triple Crown trophy awarded to jockey Steve Cauthen and his horse Affirmed for their victory in the 1978 Preakness Stakes; an 1892 Grover Cleveland campaign ribbon; an ancient Roman toga pin, which turns out to actually be from the Villanovan period; and a radio vision machine.
542	3	"Pawn of the Undead"	February 4, 2019
Items appraised include an 1860s elevator model; a Philip Burne-Jones vampire defense kit; a Bellatori trackless train, which Chumlee buys for $4,500 without Rick's consent and angers him even more by using the shop's parking lot to give customers rides on the train; a prop pistol from the 1995 James Bond film GoldenEye; a guitar strap owned by Stevie Ray Vaughan; an 1863 James McNeill Whistler drawing; and an Allied war room map from World War II, which Rick immediately rejects, as the map was actually printed before the war, as well as the fact that it has swastikas drawn on it.
543	4	"United States of Pawn"	February 11, 2019
Items appraised include a phone from the White House during Ronald Reagan's presidency; an 1863 ambrotype photo of Abraham Lincoln and Mary Todd Lincoln; a plaster Easter egg signed by George H. W. Bush, George W. Bush, and Barbara Bush; a framed document signed by Queen Victoria; an Army Air Corps helmet allegedly owned by Reagan, which Rick and Corey seek to authenticate with a trip to Rancho del Cielo in California, where they meet Reagan's adoptive son, Michael; a Camarasaurus dinosaur leg; and an 1893 coin commemorating the World's Columbian Exposition.
544	5	"International Pawn of Mystery"	February 25, 2019
Items appraised include an ancient Roman military diploma; an autographed self-portrait of Alfred Hitchcock; a 1961 Kellogg's Sugar Smacks cereal box; a Revolutionary War-era horse head sword; a Superman sketch signed by Joe Shuster and Jerry Siegel; a miniature 1950s roulette table; and a rosary said to be from the 1715 Treasure Fleet. Also, Chumlee travels to Los Angeles to check out the cryogenic chamber featured in the 1997 film Austin Powers: International Man of Mystery.
545	6	"Pawn of the Seas"	March 4, 2019
Items appraised include an early 1900s Elgin bicycle with wooden wheels; a complete set of Prince's comic book, Alter Ego; a 1785 map displaying Captain James Cook's voyages; a set of bagpipes autographed by wrestler Roddy Piper; a screen-used box of Super Colon Blow from Saturday Night Live; a set of The New York Times newspapers from August 1918; a 1940s Excercycle; and a collection of 1954 and 1955 hockey cards.
546	7	"Pawn to the Rescue"	March 11, 2019
Items appraised include a journal that belonged to Hunter S. Thompson; an antique X-ray machine; a BASEketball from the eponymous 1998 film signed by Matt Stone and Trey Parker; a 1923 Audemars Piguet pocket watch; and a 1920s Paris Métro train car seat. Also, Rick travels to the South, looking to buy an antique fire truck for his ranch in Oregon, which Corey and Chumlee ridicule him for. During Rick's trip, he visits an antique shop in Georgia and checks out a collection of 1910s pennants made into a wheel by a sailor from the USS Arkansas, a Boone Trail Highway sign, and a large 1960s Gulf Oil sign. In Alabama, a fire truck that catches Rick's attention is a 1962 Ford pumper, which he buys for $3,000.
547	8	"Pawn Off the Grid"	March 18, 2019
Items appraised include three Funko Pop vinyl toys; a continuity binder for the 1994 film Dumb and Dumber; a first edition collection of History of the Indian Tribes of North America; an antique fire alarm callbox, which Corey and Chumlee buy for $350 as a gift for Rick; an 1849 gold-plated Colt pistol; and a 1930s Indian motorcycle toolbox. Also, Rick checks in on the progress of the restoration of his 1962 Ford pumper fire truck from the previous episode. After the restoration is completed, Rick invites Corey and Chumlee on a motorcycle trip to his ranch in Oregon to see the truck. On the way, they visit Rick's friend's machine shop and check out a rusty 1912 Excelsior engine, an antique measuring tool for buggy wheels, and an antique butt hook.
548	9	"A Game of Pawns"	May 20, 2019
Items appraised include a German cutaway car model; two Amazonian blowguns; a 17th-century Moorish sword; the Santa Claus costume worn by Billy Bob Thornton in the 2003 film Bad Santa, whose missing prop tags concern Corey; a collection of tickets from the 1936 Democratic National Convention; an 1887 "Elite Conversation" card game; a collection of coins commemorating racers who died in the 1960s, which Rick immediately rejects; and an autographed limited edition copy of George R. R. Martin's A Game of Thrones.
549	10	"Pink Trains and Open Flames"	May 27, 2019
Items appraised include a 1955 first edition of The Guinness Book of Records; an ancient Roman mortar; a 1957 Lionel girls' train set; a Not-A-Flamethrower from the Boring Company, which Chumlee buys for himself for $1,400; a 2009 World Series New York Yankees ring; an antique prank device; a 1960s ice bucket that lists several different sports championships, which Rick immediately rejects; and a 1933 World's Fair umbrella.
550	11	"He Shoots, He Pawns"	June 3, 2019
Items appraised include an envelope signed by George Armstrong Custer; a 1920s salesman sample stove; a 1960s Lotus F1 toy race car; a signed photography book by Ansel Adams; and a bronze bust of Michelangelo's Pietà. Also, Rick travels to Philadelphia to check out a collection of Kareem Abdul-Jabbar memorabilia, which is being auctioned off to raise money for a charity headed by Abdul-Jabbar. Rick also gets the chance to meet Abdul-Jabbar himself while authenticating the collection. Afterwards, Rick checks out a game-used hat and jersey worn by Honus Wagner.
551	12	"Sign of the Times"	June 10, 2019
Items appraised include a bolo knife from the Philippine–American War, whose value leads to a bet between Corey and Chumlee; an ancient Roman brothel token; an original Peanuts illustration by Charles M. Schulz; an 1891 Louis Vuitton trunk; a cavalry jacket from the Napoleonic era; a mourning brooch commemorating General George Henry Vansittart; and a bleacher seat cushion from the 1931 Indianapolis 500. Also, Rick tasks Rick Dale to restore the Gulf Oil sign, which the former purchased for $1,500 in "Pawn to the Rescue".
552	13	"The Chuminator"	June 17, 2019
Items appraised include a 1953 Monopoly board game; a vintage tin grocery store toy; a collection of signed Alice in Chains memorabilia; a 1944 vinyl recording of the Liberty Bell; and a 1950s snakebite kit. Also, Rick and Chumlee travel to Los Angeles to check out a large collection of vintage steel printing plates from the American Bank Note Company. Afterwards, they visit a prop house to check out a collection of prop torsos used in the 2003 film Terminator 3: Rise of the Machines.
553	14	"Pawning Picasso"	June 24, 2019
Items appraised include an antique donkey cigar trade stimulator; a certificate of achievement awarded to Carroll Lufcy, who helped develop the atomic bomb; miniature salesman samples of a cello, a violin, and a guitar; an 1800s Ezekiel Baker rifle; a 1950s motorcycle jacket said to be owned by Marlon Brando; a 1976 Honda Kick n' Go scooter; a 1952 ceramic plate by Pablo Picasso; a 1956 Pez space ray gun, which Chumlee wants as a decorative piece for his candy shop; and a 1925 Norse-American medal.
554	15	"A Demon of a Deal"	July 1, 2019
Items appraised include a customized 1979 Gibson Flying V guitar signed by Karl Sandoval, which is authenticated by Sandoval himself; a collection of 1940s car hood ornaments; a World War II-era smatchet; a racing jacket worn by Dale Earnhardt in the 1993 Coca-Cola 600; a 1911 California license plate; a jewelry casket sculpted by Jules Moigniez; an 1878 3D image book; an antique apothecary scale; and a Pursuit pedal airplane. Also, Corey is determined to prove to Rick that he can make a profit on brand new cars, when he reveals that he recently purchased a brand new 2018 Dodge Demon for $75,000.
555	16	"From Pawn, With Love"	July 15, 2019
Items appraised include a 1920s micro-dynameter, which is a quack medicine device; a collection of prototype Care Bear Cousins teddy bears; an original map of the Battle of Gettysburg; an antique love tester machine; a party lantern from the Mad Tea Party ride at Disneyland; a suit owned by NBA legend Shaquille O'Neal; a self-portrait of Thomas Lipton; a 1960s chunky lamp; a limited edition tiki mug; a 1980s V action figure; and a duplicate Thomas Jefferson writing desk.
556	17	"Rebel Without a Pawn"	July 22, 2019
Items appraised include a 1941 Edison voicewriter; a 1700s flintlock pistol with a poor restoration job that concerns Rick; a 1920s indoor golf game; a bracelet owned by James Dean; a collection of Disney Dollars; and a schoolboy hat that belonged to Angus Young from AC/DC. Also, Rick travels to New Jersey to check out a Cushman scooter from World War II.
557	18	"Corey's House of Blues"	July 29, 2019
Items appraised include an 1800s revolving rifle; a 1947 toy Woodette Tornado race car; a 1686 land deed from Long Island; an Epiphone guitar signed by B. B. King; a collection of art by Steve Kaufman; an 1800s Japanese scabbard; an 1890s pop-up book; and a Ford security guard badge with four buttons.
558	19	"Happy Meal, Happy Deal"	August 5, 2019
Items appraised include pieces of wreckage from the Hindenburg disaster; a 1970s Mayor McCheese plaque from McDonald's; two antique bottles of rattlesnake oil and hair tonic; a gorilla soldier costume from the 1968 film Planet of the Apes; an Adventureland bowl set; two vinyl Black Sabbath albums; a party dress from the Vietnam War with several collectible patches; an antique anatomical eye model; a 1920s Scottish outfit; and a 1774 Continental Congress document.
559	20	"Who's Pawning With Me!"	August 19, 2019
Items appraised include a 1994 IBM Simon cell phone; a hat worn by Charlie Chaplin in his 1928 film The Circus; a framed piece of paper signed by The Jackson 5; a 1967 Berry Mini-T dune buggy; an antique cigarette vending machine; three ancient South American artifacts, one of which turns out to actually be a 1950s Egyptian oil lamp; an antique terrestrial globe; and a collection of props from the 1996 film Jerry Maguire.

=== Season 17 (2019–20) ===
No. overall	No. in season	Title	Original release date
560	1	"Shooting Pawns"	October 21, 2019
Items appraised include an 1856 Savage Arms revolver; an Asmat ancestor skull; an 1800s 18-karat gold minute repeater pocket watch; a mouthguard said to be used by LeBron James during his high school years; a Campo del Cielo meteorite; and a walking cane that belonged to Anwar Sadat. Also, Corey, Chumlee, and Antwuan travel to Carson City to check out a 1970 Triumph Tiger 650 motorcycle.
561	2	"A Show About Nothing"	October 28, 2019
Items appraised include a Seinfeld cast and crew ring, which is authenticated by John O'Hurley, who played Jacopo "J" Peterman on the show; a 2002 Winter Olympics snowboard signed by 39 athletes; a Civil War-era belt buckle; Patsy Cline's 1954 record contract with 4 Star Records, which turns out to be a reprint; and a 1956 Forbidden Planet movie poster. Also, Rick travels to Boston to check out a 1652 New England shilling, and then to Michigan to check out a 1969 Chevrolet Camaro RS/SS 350 car and a 1925 Chris-Craft boat, during which he unexpectedly runs into Chumlee.
562	3	"Boats and Bros"	November 4, 2019
Continuing their Michigan trip from the previous episode, Rick and Chumlee check out a 116th Infantry Brigade sign; a 1940s Douglas Aircraft Company rowboat; an Oilzum Motor Oil sign; a Ford FE 427 engine; a 1950s RC Cola cooler; and a World War I experimental Model 8 helmet, which is authenticated by a Ford Motor Company archivist. Back in Las Vegas, items appraised include a Japanese torpedo gyroscope from World War II; a Rocky III statue signed by Sylvester Stallone; a tie clasp said to be owned by Richard Nixon; an 1859 etching by James McNeill Whistler; a Carnegie Steel Company scale model of a fishplate; and a letter written by Ted Bundy.
563	4	"Rick and the Heartbreakers"	November 11, 2019
Items appraised include two military gold kits found at a flea market in Poland, one of which appears to have never been opened; a vintage bilge pump movie prop from Metro-Goldwyn-Mayer Studios; a signed sketch by Tom Petty; a Rolls-Royce Silver Cloud bar, which Rick immediately identifies as a fake and rejects; a vintage Relaxacizor; a 1919 Ouija board; a French Revolution-era etching; a 1985 Sports Illustrated magazine signed by Hulk Hogan and Ric Flair; and a 1946 booklet from the $120 Gold Club.
564	5	"Pawn v. Ferrari"	November 18, 2019
Items appraised include a pair of German binoculars from World War II; a 1999 Shelby Series 1 car; a letter signed by Andrew Johnson and dated nine days after the assassination of Abraham Lincoln; a medieval Anglo-Saxons iron helmet; a limited edition Von Dutch art book; a set of 1933 Three Little Pigs figurines; a limited edition Super Mario Bros. Nintendo game cartridge; and a Madballs monster bat.
565	6	"Silver, Slots and Robots"	December 9, 2019
Items appraised include a pair of crutches fitted with flintlock pistols that belonged to James Nicoll Morris; a 1970s Reideen The Brave toy robot from Japan; an original Battleship game prototype; a signed first edition copy of Alfred Henry Spink's The National Game; a vintage Mills wooden slot machine; a British cordite bucket; and a 15th-century Incan kero cup. Also, Rick announces to Corey and Chumlee that he is opening a new art gallery at The Venetian Las Vegas.
566	7	"May the Pawn Be With You"	December 23, 2019
Items appraised include a 1958 Philco Predicta TV; two antique cast-iron toy vehicles; a 1950s Planters peanut jar; an antique hard-boiled egg vending machine; and a toy Ewok telephone. Also, Rick travels to London to look at some props from the original Star Wars trilogy, most notably the Han Solo DL-44 blaster from the first film. Back in Las Vegas, Corey discovers that Rick has hired his picker friend Spencer as an intern pawn broker.
567	8	"Pawning for Treble"	January 20, 2020
Items appraised include an antique miner's lunchbox; an 1886 leather scabbard; a 1731 violin, whose seller claims is a Stradivarius; a Japanese ivory statue of skeletons playing poker; a Chicago Bulls jersey worn and signed by Michael Jordan; a vintage Pianos Daude Company poster; a Batman Wayne Foundation dollhouse; two 1934 FBI wanted posters for John Dillinger and Baby Face Nelson; three 18th-century French fans; and two signed Nirvana vinyl albums. Also, Rick travels to a sports memorabilia convention in Chicago to get a vintage Hulk Hogan doll signed by Hogan himself as a present for Corey.
568	9	"Gold (& Silver) Digger"	January 27, 2020
Items appraised include an 1800s Boutet shotgun; two large carnival art pieces; a rare Kanye West jacket; a World of Warcraft sword; a large collection of tiki mugs; an ancient Roman chariot rein guide; a survival can from the Office of Civil Defense; and a collection of 1960s stamp books. Also, Rick tasks Rick Dale to restore the 1950s RC Cola cooler, which the former purchased for $450 in "Boats and Bros".
569	10	"Ship Happens"	February 3, 2020
Items appraised include a Japanese bicycle from World War II; a collection of corkscrews, which Chumlee wants to use to create a special gift for Rick; an electric guitar signed by Paul McCartney; two large wooden tikis, which Rick immediately rejects; a 1956 coin counter; and a 1911 copy of a beer brewing history book. Also, Rick returns to Boston to look at two pieces from the USS Constitution and an original Apple I computer.
570	11	"Secret Agent Pawn"	February 10, 2020
Items appraised include a collection of counterfeit Office of Strategic Services documents from World War II, whose authentication requires Rick to travel to Washington, D.C.; a first edition Teenage Mutant Ninja Turtles comic book signed by Kevin Eastman; a piece of wallpaper from the White House; a maternity dress that belonged to Jackie Kennedy; a Wide World of Sports blazer patch; and a mugshot photo of singer Janis Joplin taken during her 1969 arrest, whose seller is the son of the officer who made the arrest. Also, during Rick's trip, he is unexpectedly offered a tour of the CIA Museum, which is not open to the public. At the museum, Rick sees a hat owned by Franklin D. Roosevelt on display and learns that it is on loan, so he attempts to buy it.
571	12	"Pawnanza"	March 2, 2020
Items appraised include a signed map of the Ponderosa from the TV show Bonanza; a Japanese tantō knife, which turns out to be a flower knife called a hana katana; an 1873 The Sun newspaper article centering on a shipwreck, which Rick immediately rejects, as it is not considered an event of historical significance; two ancient Mexican clay sculptures; a 1940s film-editing projector; a first edition copy of Harper Lee's To Kill a Mockingbird; a Pee-wee's Playhouse scooter; and a 1904 McClellan saddle.
572	13	"A Bombsight for Sore Eyes"	March 9, 2020
Items appraised include two Civil War-era sabers; a Gusto Dunk trophy awarded to Philadelphia 76ers small forward Julius Erving; a World War II-era bombsight; two late 1800s medicine bottles; a World War I-era blood pressure machine; an 1888 "Scarface" Morgan dollar; a book of Henri Matisse prints; and a vintage Toasty-Bun Cafe sandwich maker.
573	14	"Watches, Waistcoats and Wizards"	March 16, 2020
Items appraised include an electronically heated suit from World War II; a 1946 target pistol arcade game; a 19th-century sewing box; four antique telephones; a vintage Esso sign; a trench periscope from World War I; a set of vintage rock climbing gear, which provokes Chumlee to show off his rock climbing skills when Rick states that the former does not have any; a pocket watch and waistcoat owned by John Hancock, which Rick wants to display in his art gallery; a hockey puck commemorating the Vegas Golden Knights' inaugural home game; a collection of vintage movie and World War I posters; a life-size statue of Dobby from Harry Potter; and an umbrella from the 1900 United States presidential election.
574	15	"Pawnsplosion"	March 27, 2020
Items appraised include a 1955 Schwinn triplet bicycle, which Rick, Chumlee, and Antwuan take for a test ride; two portraits from The Haunted Mansion at Disneyland; two spy gadgets disguised as a pen and coin, which Rick rejects when he sees that the pen is a concealed firearm; a collection of World War II toy soldiers; a leather jacket signed by several NBA players, including Michael Jordan; and a collection of vintage Valentine's Day cards. Also, Rick considers buying an army tank to display in the shop's parking lot, so he checks out an M4 Sherman tank that was used during the Battle of Iwo Jima. At the same time, Chumlee also shows an interest in a 1960s M9A1 flamethrower.
575	16	"Across the Pawn'd"	April 3, 2020
Items appraised include a skeletal paw of a cave bear; a cast-autographed Home Improvement photo to commemorate the show's 100th episode; a Floyd Nichols fighting knife, which Rick immediately identifies as a fake and rejects; an animatronic hobo and bear; a 1902 blowtorch; and a Daisy Red Ryder shooting game. Also, Rick returns to London to look at two Scottish Highland dress pistols and a 1600 German wheel-lock pistol made of staghorn coral. Afterwards, he checks out three British sports cars, one of which is a Jaguar E-Type Series 3, as well as an Austin Westminster owned by Winston Churchill.
576	17	"Crossbows, Coins and Conspiracies"	April 10, 2020
Items appraised include a U.S. Army footlocker that belonged to General Douglas MacArthur; an antique crossbow; two film reels of the Dallas police report of the assassination of John F. Kennedy; a Tibetan kapala; a jersey autographed by San Diego Chargers running back LaDainian Tomlinson; an antique ice cream maker, which Chumlee starts to use to make his own ice cream before a deal is even made; a 2007 George Washington Presidential dollar coin with an odd bump on it, which turns out to be counterfeit; and a 1960s The Man from U.N.C.L.E. cap gun.
577	18	"Boston Pawn Sox"	April 17, 2020
Items appraised include a 1000% Bearbrick; a 354th Fighter Group jacket from World War II, which was owned by the seller's father-in-law; a World War I-era sword, which Rick rejects due to its poor condition; three pieces of Aztec axe currency, whose value leads to a bet between Corey and Chumlee; a 1930s Mysto magic set; and a fossilized primate hand from the Neanderthal period, which turns out to actually be a dinosaur footprint. Also, Rick returns to Boston check out a collection of Boston Red Sox memorabilia that dates back to the beginning of the franchise, during which he also takes a tour of Fenway Park.
578	19	"I Don't Give a Dime"	May 11, 2020
Items appraised include a 1713 map of the Americas; a tiny diamond made with the DNA from Ludwig van Beethoven's hair; an antique parrot cage; a collection of cartoon art by Floyd Norman, which is brought in by Norman himself; a collection of Civil War-era dime novels; a collection of Welcome Back, Kotter toys; two antique gas-powered bicycle lamps; an 1868 14-karat gold belt buckle; and an Anna Pottery pig flask. Also, as a present for Rick's 55th birthday, Chumlee decides to get the parrot cage restored and even buys a parrot to go with the cage.
579	20	"Saints and Winners"	May 18, 2020
Items appraised include a tie and handkerchiefs worn by James Gandolfini in the TV show The Sopranos; a 1578 copy of Jean Bodin's Les Six livres de la République; a zucchetto worn by Pope Pius XII, along with a papal ring worn by Pope Paul II; and a Dream Puzzler. Also, Rick and Chumlee travel to Rome to get the zucchetto authenticated. During their trip, Rick checks out a rare first edition Giordano Bruno book, and then he and Chumlee check out two Vespa scooters: a 1976 Super Sprint and a 1973 TS.
580	21	"Slice and Dice"	June 1, 2020
Items appraised include a 1944 Leica III military camera; a 17th-century padlock key gun; a recycled metal sculpture of Johnny 5 from the 1986 film Short Circuit; a late 1800s miniature printing press; a 1959 Ford bus painted by John Van Hamersveld; a collection of Jackie Robinson rookie cards printed by Bond Bread; Pink Floyd gituarist David Gilmour's gold record award for The Dark Side of the Moon; an antique Japanese sword; and a World War II victory bell.
581	22	"Wind Beneath My Mill"	June 15, 2020
Items appraised include an 1866 key-wind pocket watch; an autographed photo of Cy Young; an 1889 jack of the United States; an ancient oenochoe; a 1930s Harley-Davidson rainsuit; a vintage fruit press; a 1930s spanker; two bronze dragon andirons; and a guard's helmet from the 1997 film Turbo: A Power Rangers Movie. Also, Rick tasks Rick Dale to restore an early 19th-century windmill that the former recently purchased for $3,100, and which he wants for his Oregon ranch.
582	23	"Bang, Zoom, Pawn on the Moon!"	June 22, 2020
Items appraised include an ambulance keg said to be from the Civil War; a 1950s neon arcade sign; an Apollo 10 booklet signed by John Young, Thomas P. Stafford, Ronald Reagan, and Charles M. Schulz; a collection of NSYNC dolls, along with an autographed photo of the band, both of which are authenticated by band member Joey Fatone; a 1995 American Eagle proof coin set, which motivates Chumlee to start coin roll hunting; a set of golf clubs said to be owned by entertainer Bob Hope; and two 1960s circus sideshow banners.
583	24	"Mystery Safe"	June 29, 2020
Items appraised include a snowmobile helmet owned and signed by racing legend Mario Andretti; a World War II army jacket covered in a collection of patches; an 1800s G.O. Blake's Whiskey sign; a huge 1800s safe whose contents are unknown; an antique industrial cheese slicer; a 1940s Superman costume; a 1974 Honda CL360 motorcycle; an antique salesman sample printing press; and an 1892 clay pigeon shooter.
584	25	"Pawnfellas"	July 6, 2020
Items appraised include a pair of antique handcuffs from Folsom State Prison; an 18th-century Indo-Persian helmet; a bar of soap that was part of an obesity cure scam in the 1920s; a tuxedo worn by Ray Liotta for the role of Frank Sinatra in the 1998 film The Rat Pack; a 1962 Fender Jazzmaster guitar; a mortar training set from World War II; a $5 note from the Kirtland Safety Society; and an 1869 appointment document signed by Ulysses S. Grant.
585	26	"A Dam Good Road Trip"	July 13, 2020
Items appraised include a 1935 cast-aluminum model of the Hoover Dam by Gladys Caldwell Fisher; a Zack Morris doll from the TV show Saved by the Bell; an autographed 1960s America's Space Pilots newsletter; and a part of a 1904 Ransom & Randolph torch. Also, the men travel down Route 66 to Seligman, Arizona to check out a 1963 Volkswagen Karmann Ghia convertible, a childhood dream car of Rick's. On the way, they stop in Kingman to check out two mechanical roping steers at Chumlee's request. After checking out the car, Chumlee checks out two 1950s gumball machines, while Rick checks out a set of Route 66 signs.
586	27	"A Loose Cannon"	July 20, 2020
Items appraised include an early 1900s cigar torch lighter; a large collection of The Simpsons toys; an antique shuffling machine with a 1914 deck of cards; 16 original film reels of the 1959 film Ben-Hur; an 1890s hotel annunciator panel; a 1937 horse racing slot machine; a 1902 British mountain cannon, which is considered an antique because of its friction-prime system; and a Civil War soldier's kepi.
587	28	"Million Dollar Deal"	July 27, 2020
Items appraised include an elephant bird egg; a Vietnam War-era compass; a miniature Bugs Bunny and Gossamer sculpture; an autographed Alice Cooper poster; a miniature Haunted Mansion chest; a letter from Richard Nixon to Sammy Davis Jr.; an 1810 Russian saber; an antique violin clock; a 1920s digger arcade game; and an antique child's sewing machine. Also, Rick returns to London, looking to buy some art for his gallery, so he checks out two original prints by Banksy, which he buys for a total of $840,000, which, at the time, was the closest deal to a million-dollar deal ever made in the show's history. This deal was surpassed in Season 19 a year later, when Rick purchased a broadside copy of the Declaration of Independence for $1.45 million, making this the show's first-ever million-dollar deal.

=== Season 18 (2020–21) ===
No. overall	No. in season	Title	Original release date
588	1	"Close Encounters of the Pawn Kind"	November 16, 2020
Items appraised include a 1960s Zenith shortwave radio; two Indiana Jones figurines; two Mighty Mouse fan club packs; a painting by Ralph Albert Blakelock; a "licensed to buy gold" sign; a signed first edition copy of Kenneth Arnold and Raymond A. Palmer's The Coming of the Saucers; and a collection of vintage Matchbox cars. Also, Rick and Chumlee return to Los Angeles to look at a collection of Kobe Bryant memorabilia.
589	2	"Rick's Gone With the Wind"	November 16, 2020
Items appraised include an antique smudge pot fire starter; a customized Ludwig drum set that was originally made for Ringo Starr, but was instead played by Bun E. Carlos; an 1868 engineering proposal for a tunnel under Boston Harbor; an Eclipse windmill (for which this episode serves as a build-up to the events of the Season 17 episode "Wind Beneath My Mill"); a giant limited edition Starbucks mug; a 1940s portable craps table; a Chickering & Sons piano works salesman sample, which Rick immediately rejects; a 1924 Packard vacuum cleaner; a Hasbro Kamala action figure; and a death row cell door said to be from Ely State Prison. Also, Rick decides to teach Chumlee and Corey how to play craps.
590	3	"Decoding a Deal"	November 23, 2020
Items appraised include a Strong Trouperette II spotlight; two 1955 Disneyland brochures; two World Series souvenir bats from 1939 and 1957; a test pressing of the Eagles' Hotel California signed by the entire band; an antique bronze gas lamp; a set of original blueprints for Fallingwater by Frank Lloyd Wright; a 1942 Little Orphan Annie secret decoder ring; a World War I-era military shaving kit; and a Leonardo da Vinci flying machine model.
591	4	"The Spy Who Pawned Me"	November 30, 2020
Items appraised include a journal of the Lewis and Clark Expedition; a Hamilton Beach malt maker; a minesweeper from World War II; a collection of James Bond Thunderball trading cards; a sword that belonged to Senator Joseph McCarthy; a bianzhong bell; and four signed TGIF scripts. Also, Chumlee and Antwuan travel to Lake Tahoe to check out a 1972 Catalina 27 sailboat.
592	5	"Mo' Monet, Mo' Problems"	December 7, 2020
Items appraised include an antique card trimmer; a 1916 Old Rose Distilling Company whiskey jug; an 1891 letter by Claude Monet; a 1940s candy vending machine; a 1920s dental chair and drill; a William Rogers Company silverware set; two Buffy the Vampire Slayer action figures; an emergency light from Las Vegas' first ladder fire truck; an antique cast-iron mechanical cat-and-mouse bank; and a World War II-era folding saw.
593	6	"Raiders of the Lost Pawn"	December 14, 2020
Items appraised include two vintage T-shirts of The Who and The Rolling Stones; a license to carry and a brooch, which are both from the Papal States; an Easy Rider helmet signed by Peter Fonda; a 1703 indentured servant contract; a 1966 Gumby tin Jeep; a 1968 Gad Ullman pop art poster; a 1980s Little People doll; and two vintage Atari video games: Frogger and Raiders of the Lost Ark.
594	7	"Dueling and Dealing"	December 21, 2020
Items appraised include a set of diagrams for the Apollo 11 Lunar Module Eagle; a 1950s Martin tiple; a collection of 19th-century pistols that belonged to the seller's great-great-grandfather, which leads to a shooting competition between Rick and Corey; an 1892 drypoint etching by Pierre-Auguste Renoir; a 1962 Harley-Davidson Topper scooter; a collection of antique biscuit tins; an antique suitcase; a Carole Lombard autograph; and an antique miter saw and box.
595	8	"The Need for Speed"	December 28, 2020
Items appraised include a speeding ticket that was issued to rock singer Sammy Hagar; a 1957 anatomical poster; a shoe phone from the Dunes Hotel; an antique Indian dowry chest; an M82 Nintendo demo system, which inspires Chumlee to create a video game about himself; the final gaming license that was issued to Howard Hughes before his death, which turns out to be a photocopy; a signed first edition copy of J. K. Rowling's Harry Potter and the Philosopher's Stone; a strap commemorating the sale of the one-millionth case of Johnnie Walker whiskey; an 1836 New York City Fire Department exemption certificate; and an 1822 general store ledger.
596	9	"Gotsta Get Pawned"	January 4, 2021
Items appraised include a limited edition life-size Spider-Man figure from Blockbuster; a jacket that belonged to Billy Gibbons from ZZ Top, which is authenticated by Gibbons himself, who also offers to buy the jacket back for $40,000 (while splitting the cost with Rick), so he can donate it to a blues museum in Austin, Texas; an antique military dog tag printer; an antique football said to be from a 1902 game at Yale Field; a Journey into Mystery comic book featuring the debut of Thor; two flasks said to be from the Tang dynasty; a 1979 Gibson Thunderbird bass guitar; a 1930s View-Master 3D projector; and a 1920s hot-air balloon chandelier. Also, Rick visits his comic book expert Steve, looking to buy a piece of comic book art for his gallery.
597	10	"Knock Your Sox Off"	January 11, 2021
Items appraised include a John Wilkes Booth wanted poster; a diamond piano ring designed by Liberace that was owned by Vince Cardell; a German Notgeld album; a 1967 paipo bellyboard; a signed letter by Chicago White Sox owner Charles Comiskey; a set of 1960s peacock furniture; three Burmese tattoo books; a 1959 painting by Clementine Hunter; a collection of 1980s picture disc records; and an 1898 National cash register.
598	11	"Rick's Big Shot"	March 22, 2021
Items appraised include an overcoat that belonged to Lee Harvey Oswald, who was John F. Kennedy's assassin; a 1987 Gibson SG Elite guitar; an original The Sting soundtrack signed by Paul Newman and Robert Redford; a limited edition Mike Tyson's Punch-Out!! Nintendo video game; a 1941 M3 half-track carrier; a Louis Vuitton purse; a wardrobe collection from the TV documentary series Tiger King; and a medal commemorating the British taking control of Quebec during the Seven Years' War.
599	12	"Pawn Shop Rock"	March 29, 2021
Items appraised include a set of Hank Aaron and Rickey Henderson baseball cards; a guitar pick used by Elvis Presley; a collection of limited edition Norman Rockwell dolls; a tantō said to have been owned by Admiral Isoroku Yamamoto; an autographed Harry Blackstone poster; a solid silver bust of Julius Caesar; and a 1932 Harley-Davidson GC engine. Also, Corey's younger brother, Jake, is hired for a summer job at the pawn shop, and Rick tasks Corey and Chumlee to train him.
600	13	"Bam! Pow! Pawn!"	April 5, 2021
This retrospective episode spotlights some of the most notable superhero-related items appraised on the show, including: the Journey into Mystery comic book and the life-size Spider-Man figure, which were both featured in Season 18's "Gotsta Get Pawned"; the 1977 The Amazing Spider-Man comic strip signed by Stan Lee and John Romita Sr. from Season 14's "Spider Pawn"; the Batmobile replica from Season 3's "Chummobile"; the Superman costume and green kryptonite crystal from Superman: The Movie from Season 14's "Up Up and Away!"; the Batman and Superman giclée print from Season 14's "Gilded Pawn Age"; the Batman Wayne Foundation dollhouse from Season 17's "Pawning for Treble"; the Batman Forever props from Season 6's "Silver Linings"; and the first issues of The Avengers and Giant-Size X-Men from Season 11's "Avengers Assemble".
601	14	"Rick's Surreal Supper"	April 12, 2021
Items appraised include a stunt helmet owned by Evel Knievel, which is authenticated by Knievel's son, Kelly; a chair sculpture by Evgeni Vodenitcharov; an Oscar Mayer Wienermobile pedal car; an incubator from Mir; four limited edition Teenie Beanies; an autographed Salvador Dalí cookbook, which Rick buys for himself for $500 and uses to try to cook a special dinner, which turns out terrible; a Werewolf by Night comic book; and two M&M's store displays.
602	15	"That's the Way the Cookie Crumbles"	April 19, 2021
Items appraised include a Mick Foley T-shirt and autographed mask, which are authenticated by Foley himself; a Kelly Works axe; a first edition copy of S. W. Erdnase's The Expert at the Card Table; an unopened 40-year-old McDonald's cookie that was given to the seller for his first birthday; and a painting by Ted Hamlin titled Sunday in Augusta, which depicts golfers Arnold Palmer and Jack Nicklaus facing off against each other. Also, Rick and Corey travel to Los Angeles to check out a collection of vintage arcade games, as well as a mechanical clown head.
603	16	"To Infinity and Be-pawned!"	April 26, 2021
Items appraised include a gold pendant that was given by Ronald Reagan to Adele Jergens, who was the seller's mother-in-law, along with a photo album of Jergens' history with the film industry; two Gisele Bündchen window displays from Louis Vuitton; an Ethiopian prayer scroll; a large collection of vintage vinyl albums; a 40-millimeter cannon; a collection of characters from the Toy Story franchise; and a dress that was worn by Penny Marshall on the TV show Laverne & Shirley.
604	17	"Pawn Stars and Movie Stars"	May 3, 2021
Items appraised include a law book by John Adams, which turns out not to be by the Founding Father; a 1965 12-string Rickenbacker guitar; a movie poster for the yet-to-be-released film Reagan signed by Dennis Quaid, which is authenticated by Quaid himself; a suit worn by Drew Barrymore in the 2000 film Charlie's Angels; Bruno Mars' platinum record award for Doo-Wops & Hooligans, which was won by the seller in a radio contest; a barnstrormer's jacket; an antique ophthalmometer; a 1940s flipperless pinball machine; two Pinocchio and Jiminy Cricket figurines designed by Kaws; and a pair of limited edition Timberland boots designed and autographed by Ringo Starr. Also, Quaid shows an interest in buying some Ronald Reagan memorabilia, so Rick takes him out to dinner and shows him the Army Air Corps helmet from the Season 16 episode "United States of Pawn" and the gold pendant Reagan gifted to Adele Jergens from the previous episode. Quaid ends up buying the pendant (which Rick purchased for $2,350) for $2,750.
605	18	"Atomic Pawn"	May 10, 2021
Items appraised include a Douglas DC-3 airplane globe lamp; a golf glove worn and signed by Jack Nicklaus; an unopened G.I. Joe Tomahawk helicopter; a 1953 Fender Deluxe amplifier; and a signed copy of George Wharton Edwards' Constantinople. Also, Rick goes picking with Spencer at a private showroom in California, and they check out a bomber's jacket; two suitcases owned by soldiers from World War II; a US Air Force K-1 flight helmet; and a battle flag from the USS Spearfish.
606	19	"Once a Pawn a Time in Hollywood"	May 17, 2021
Items appraised include an antique Carlisle & Finch searchlight; a vintage candy vending machine; a 1940s taxi driver's hat; a leather jacket with a three-eyed face painted on the back of it by Keith Haring; a suit of armor from the 2014 film Night at the Museum: Secret of the Tomb; and a 1972 Magnavox Odyssey video game system. Also, Rick and Chumlee return to Los Angeles to check out a large collection of movie and TV show props dated from the 1950s to the present. Afterwards, they check out a Skyway bucket from Disneyland.
607	20	"Off the Rails"	August 14, 2021
Items appraised include two vintage hair dryer chairs; two acrylic busts of Romeo and Juliet by Shlomi Haziza; a signed copy of Amelia Earhart's 20 Hrs. 40 Min.; and three antique cast-iron comic strip character toys. Also, the men travel with Spencer to the Algodones Dunes in California to check out a customized sand rail.
608	21	"Bohemian Pawnsody"	August 14, 2021
Items appraised include an 18th-century trepanation kit; a gold-plated death mask of Napoleon Bonaparte; a collection of decorative photos from the recently closed Hard Rock Hotel; a set of four volumes to E. Cobham Brewer's Character Sketches of Romance; a hat, photo, and action figure signed by Pat Morita; a 1942 Harley-Davidson flathead motor, which Corey wants to use for his motorcycle collection; and three life-size Alvin and the Chipmunks displays.
609	22	"Wanted: Pawned or Alive"	August 21, 2021
Items appraised include a drumhead and drumsticks autographed by Bon Jovi; a beret from the Vietnam War; The Incredible Hulk #181; a collection of vintage US President trading cards; a Super Bowl XXXVII bucket hat; three Snow White and the Seven Dwarfs pencil holders; and a 1765 medical book by Robert Whytt. Also, Rick and Chumlee visit a shoe collector friend of the former's in Los Angeles to look at a pair of shoes worn by Michael Jordan in the 1996 film Space Jam.
610	23	"Rick's Big Triumph"	August 28, 2021
Items appraised include a 1755 manuscript detailing the instructions of governing New York; a KFC bucket chandelier; a The Amazing Spider-Man comic book signed by Stan Lee; a 1930s Champion spark plug display case; a Teddy Ruxpin doll; a shrunken head, which inspires Corey to create shrunken heads of himself and the others, including the Old Man; a 1970 Triumph TR6 Trophy motorcycle; and a limited edition Transformers toy truck.
611	24	"Rick vs. the Globe of Death"	September 4, 2021
Items appraised include two signed letters by Albert Einstein; a 1953 shuffleboard/bowling arcade game; a replica Thor hammer and helmet; a McDonald's Big Mac jacket; a 1910 baseball stitch machine; an unopened box of Pokémon cards; two ancient Roman coins; a 1980s portrait of Sylvester Stallone; a decommissioned Thompson submachine gun; and an M1 cutaway gun.
612	25	"Jurassic Pawn"	September 18, 2021
Items appraised include a 1996 Atlanta Braves National League East Championship ring; Kurt Cobain's car insurance documents; an 1870s soda fountain machine; a 1967 Meyers Manx dune buggy; a collection of Jurassic Park pogs; a Money Team jacket; a limited edition Vic Payne sculpture; and a collection of vintage casino coins.
613	26	"Action Packed Pawn"	September 25, 2021
Items appraised include an owl vase painted by Pablo Picasso; a vintage Akai reel-to-reel tape recorder; two Russian Cossack swords; a 14.3-gram gold/quartz specimen; a collection of signed 1995 basketball cards, which Chumlee suggests to use for a mystery card pack promotion to make extra money for the shop; a Jason Aldean neon sign made by Coors Light; an original 1968 Yellow Submarine movie poster; and a Charles Lindbergh campaign medal from his 1927 tour.

=== Season 19 (2021) ===
No. overall	No. in season	Title	Original release date
614	1	"Pawn Jam"	October 2, 2021
Items appraised include a Brazilian cowboy hat owned by Ronald Reagan; a Pearl Jam blacklight poster signed by Eddie Vedder; a baseball autographed by Sammy Sosa; a pair of 1887 U.S. Army hospital knives; a set of SACO medals from World War II; an autographed copy of Peter Lik's Equation of Time, which inspires Chumlee to make a coffee table book of his own; a coat of arms from the Napoleonic Wars; and a collection of cold-painted bronze statues said to be by Franz Xaver Bergmann.
615	2	"When Pawns Cry"	October 9, 2021
Items appraised include an antique Stephen Grant shotgun said to have been owned by Edward VII; a Microvision handheld video game console with a collection of cartridges; a tambourine signed and said to be played by Prince; a pair of lamps made from 1850s Belgian army helmets; an original program for the 1915 film The Eternal City; a roster signed by Ty Cobb; a commemorative medal given to the seller by Pope Francis; an antique Reed & Barton coffee set; and an antique miniature horse velocipede, which Rick immediately identifies as a reproduction and rejects.
616	3	"Rick and Chum's Wild Ride"	October 16, 2021
Items appraised include a Gianni Versace umbrella; a first edition copy of Lucy Maud Montgomery's Anne of Green Gables; a pair of vintage albums by Led Zeppelin and Big Star; and a 1991 Harley-Davidson T-shirt. Also, Rick and Chumlee travel to Los Angeles to look at a huge collection of Disney memorabilia, while Corey stays behind to look at a huge collection of antiques centered on magic.
617	4	"Appetite for Pawnstruction"	October 23, 2021
Items appraised include a copy of the first-ever issue of Batman; a prototype of an unreleased action figure of tennis player Andre Agassi; an ancient sword that Chumlee deems to be a reproduction; a collection of British military medals; a Donald Duck bicycle manufactured by the Shelby Cycle Company; a pair of plastic flamingos signed by Don Featherstone; a box set of Guns N' Roses' Appetite for Destruction; a Nintendo game television set; and an autographed Singing Cowboys poster. Rick buys the Donald Duck bicycle for $2,250 and has it restored, only to then learn that it is actually a replica from 1953 and that the actual bike was only manufactured in 1949.
618	5	"Wreck It Rick"	October 30, 2021
Items appraised include a collection of letters from various historical figures; a 1950s Emerson Junior electric fan; an unopened limited edition Pokémon Game Boy; a vintage pair of Puma track shoes; a collection of Fyre Festival merchandise brought in by Rick's picker friend Spencer; a smashed guitar signed by Post Malone, which gives Chumlee the idea of smashing things as a therapeutic activity with Rick and Corey; and a 1688 thaler.
619	6	"Money in the Bankshot"	November 6, 2021
Items appraised include a collection of antique billiard balls, which starts a bet between Rick and Corey over how much they are worth; a framed drawing by Eugène Delacroix; a 1960s French horn; a miniature Gorham Viking ship; a 1963 Fiat 600 Multipla; a signed autobiography by Shirley Temple; a pair of stained-glass windows from Boulder Station; a jacket from the Mike Tyson vs. Francois Botha fight; and a 1927-D double eagle coin, which Rick immediately identifies as a fake and rejects.
620	7	"Pawns of Anarchy"	November 13, 2021
Items appraised include Andy Warhol's high school honor roll document; a replica NWA title belt; a vintage deck of tarot cards; an 1879 Stella coin; a 1950s Telefunken Opus 7 radio; a Sons of Anarchy vest signed by the show's cast; a collection of Spice Girls dolls; a vintage Apsit Brothers lamp; a gemstone globe made by Kalifano; and a 1980s Nike shirt.
621	8	"Rocket Man"	November 20, 2021
Items appraised include an antique Ritter dentist drill; a pair of American cavalry spurs from World War I; a 1964 Cadillac Coupe DeVille convertible; a collection of miniature Louis Marx and Company toy pistols; an Andy Warhol Superman lithograph; a Lunar Landing Training Vehicle rocket engine, which inspires Rick to build his own rocket; and an ancient coin ring, which Rick identifies as a bracelet.
622	9	"The Pawn Strikes Back"	December 4, 2021
Items appraised include a vintage Rolex mirror; a 1980 RadioShack TRS-80 computer; a painting of Katharine Hepburn with two letters by her; two ancient Gnostic amulets; an original Kodak camera; a scarf painted by Raymond Duncan; a set of The Empire Strikes Back candy dispensers; and an 1833 map of Chicago from the 1933 World's Fair. After looking at the Hepburn painting and letters, Chumlee convinces Corey to check out a dinosaur skeleton that was featured in the 1938 film Bringing Up Baby, which Hepburn starred in.
623	10	"No Sleep 'Til Vegas"	December 4, 2021
Items appraised include original artwork for the cover of the Beastie Boys' debut album, Licensed to Ill; a pair of 1918 Harley-Davidson J Model gas tanks; a set of $500 and $1,000 bills signed by Warren Buffett and Charlie Munger; a collection of awards presented to Ken Norton; three vintage cartoon lunchboxes; an antique vase from the Kumeyaay tribe; and an original blackjack table from the MGM Grand Las Vegas. Also, Chumlee plans a birthday party for his dog, Pinky.
624	11	"Declaration of Indepawndence"	December 11, 2021
Items appraised include a Colonel Sanders weathervane; a 1987 Top Gun pilot playset; a pair of door handles from the now-closed Riviera Resort; a paper plate created and signed by Roy Lichtenstein; an autographed Christian Pulisic Chelsea F.C. jersey; an antique apothecary set; and a 1938 memo from Metro-Goldwyn-Mayer discussing changes that needed to be made to The Wizard of Oz. Also, Rick returns to New York to check out a broadside copy of the Declaration of Independence. While examining the document, Rick learns that it is valued at up to $2 million, and he buys it for $1.45 million, making this the first million-dollar deal ever made in the show's history.
625	12	"The Prince of Pawn"	December 11, 2021
Items appraised include two boxes of canned emergency drinking water from the Cold War; a vintage pair of Flying Ace roller skates; a painting by Prince; a 1932 Kozy Kamp trailer; a 1940s Firestone salesman sample; a film reel of Charlie Chaplin's Caught in a Cabaret; a 1958 Orange Crush clock; a 1980 Cartier poker set; two drawings by Louis Icart; a lowrider bicycle; and a Momsen lung from a World War II-era submarine. Also, Corey travels to Virginia to check out a huge collection of radio-controlled airplanes.
626	13	"Pawnasaurus Rex"	December 18, 2021
Items appraised include a 1959 Track Rabbit go-kart; a collection of Jurassic Park toys; a Hohner harmonica store display; a 1984 Summer Olympics boxing ticket stub signed by Mike Tyson and Evander Holyfield; a doorknob from the Hancock Manor; and a late 1700s fusee clock. Also, Rick and Chumlee go on a trip to Pennsylvania to look at a 1782 Spanish cannon.
627	14	"Big Apple Rick"	December 18, 2021
Following the events of the previous episode, Rick continues his trip alone to New York to check out an original Apple Lisa computer and an Audemars Piguet watch worn by Arnold Schwarzenegger in the 1999 film End of Days, while Chumlee stays in Pennsylvania to look at a 1772 Brown Bess wall gun. Back in Las Vegas, items appraised include a copy of the comic book The Red Iceberg; a collection of Penjoy model semi-trailer trucks; an autographed Stan Lee Funko Pop; and a vintage Voigtländer camera.

=== Season 20 (2022) ===
No. overall	No. in season	Title	Original release date
628	1	"I Came, I Saw, I Pawned"	April 23, 2022
Items appraised include an F-4 Phantom control stick, which is brought in by Rick's friend, Spencer; a Rock 'n' Roll High School movie poster signed by the entire cast, including the Ramones; a huge collection of The Walking Dead action figures, which is brought in by one of the show's supporting cast members; a 1933 W.S. Darley fire station siren; three ancient Roman swords; an 1876 Mormon diary; an 18th-century European cannon; and a misprinted Pokémon card.
629	2	"Put a Cork in It"	April 30, 2022
Items appraised include a poster of Henri de Toulouse-Lautrec's Divan Japonais; a set of 1912 Yale University baseball uniforms; a set of 1950s Chinese linking rings; an unopened Steve Urkel doll; a hockey mask signed by the actors who played Jason Voorhees in the Friday the 13th franchise; a 1919 Martin ukulele; a tomb figure said to be from the Tang dynasty; and an antique apothecary cork press. Also, Rick gets the 1959 Track Rabbit go-kart restored, which he purchased for $850 in the Season 19 episode "Pawnasaurus Rex".
630	3	"Pawned Lightnin'"	May 7, 2022
Items appraised include three of University of Alabama running back Keilan Robinson's rings from the 2021 College Football Playoff National Championship; a copy of Punch Comics #12; a 1920s drypoint etching by Louis Icart; an early 1900s Mutoscope punching bag arcade game; and a huge collection of 1959 The Three Stooges trading cards. Also, Rick and Corey travel to San Diego to look at a 1949 Mercury convertible said to be the "Hell's Chariot" car from the 1978 film Grease. Afterwards, they meet up with Spencer to check out a huge collection of Hollywood memorabilia.
631	4	"Blast From the Past"	May 14, 2022
Items appraised include a 1958 Telefunken hi-fi stereo; a signed Tommy Boy movie poster; an 1885 Enterprise Star tobacco cutter; two prop suitcases said to be from the TV series Moonlighting; a pair of World War II-era snowshoes; a 1980s Nintendo R.O.B.; an ancient Asian hand cannon; and a piece of graphite from Chicago Pile-1.
632	5	"Fender Vendor"	May 21, 2022
Items appraised include a 1797 Draped Bust half-dollar; a Fender guitar said to be built by John Carruthers; an 1855 hot air furnace patent model; an ancestor figure from the Letti Islands; a Honus Wagner baseball card; a 1920s toy mechanical grasshopper; an original 1961 The Misfits movie poster; a door covered in a tapestry of celebrity signatures, which is brought in by Rick's chef friend, Barry Dakake; and an antique rotary phone.
633	6	"Pawntourage"	June 4, 2022
Items appraised include an 1899 Waltham travel clock; a Popy Godzilla toy; two 1958 Buddy Holly concert posters; a vintage leather pilot jacket with patches from World War II; a Godfather lightbox display; a Mexican ceramic duck; and a 1929 Fairbanks-Morse motor engine. Also, Chumlee returns to Los Angeles to look at a Johnnie Walker prop bottle signed by Kevin Dillon, who played Johnny "Drama" Chase in the TV series Entourage; the bottle is authenticated by Dillon himself.
634	7	"Roadmaster Rick"	June 11, 2022
Items appraised include a silver physical Bitcoin, which inspires Rick to design one of his own; a signed John Lennon lithograph; a World War II-era samurai sword; a collection of photos of Paterson, New Jersey from the Industrial Revolution; an 1857 book of poems by Francis Scott Key; a Woody doll and Wilson volleyball signed by Tom Hanks; a 1941 Buick Roadmaster; and a collection of vintage Atari video games.
635	8	"Rick's Big Check"	June 25, 2022
Items appraised include an 1872 exploration booklet and map by George Wheeler; a jacket worn by Will Smith in his sitcom, The Fresh Prince of Bel-Air, and on the cover of DJ Jazzy Jeff & the Fresh Prince's album, Homebase; a 1966 Ford Mustang car said to be owned by rock band The Killers; a collection of Magic: The Gathering prototype cards; an envelope that once contained tickets to the first game of the 1972 World Chess Championship; a set of 1950s Zorro bookends; and a huge collection of vintage transistor radios.
636	9	"Maximum Pawnage"	October 1, 2022
Items appraised include a 17th-century samurai sword; a 1920s Ybry perfume bottle; a basketball signed by the players and coaches of the 1999 WNBA All-Star Team; a limited edition Maximum Carnage set; a fire opal; an 1800s gambling kit; a prototype Furby; a Japanese autocannon from the attack on Pearl Harbor; and an original 1940 Fantasia film program.
637	10	"Yay or Neigh?"	October 8, 2022
Items appraised include a turquoise horse head; a collection of used Minié balls from the Third Battle of Winchester; a first edition copy of H. G. Wells' The First Men in the Moon; an antique cane; a collection of vintage records; a football signed by the members of the 1974 Miami Dolphins; and a copy of sheet music to a Gregorian chant. Also, Rick and Chumlee return to California to look at a 1971 Plymouth Barracuda car. Prior to this, Chumlee buys the record collection for $345 while determined to prove to Corey he can figure out prices on his own. His gamble pays off on the trip when he learns that one of the records is Johnny Burnette and the Rock 'n Roll Trio, which is valued at up to $1,500.
638	11	"There's No Crying in Pawn Stars"	October 19, 2022
Items appraised include an autographed Pulp Fiction movie poster; a vintage Garbage Pail Kids T-shirt; a book of 1940s AAGPBL baseball cards; a piece of ancient Egyptian stonework; a pair of Nike shoes designed exclusively for select employees of the company by LeBron James; an antique gilt pistol; and three fish sculptures said to be by Jim Henson.
639	12	"Samurai, Stones and Skateboards"	October 26, 2022
Items appraised include a jacket said to be owned by The Rolling Stones guitarist Keith Richards; an ancient samurai mask; a 1973 Fisher-Price movie viewer; a set of tin toys commemorating what is initially said to be the Coronation of Elizabeth II, but is actually the Coronation of George VI and Elizabeth; an old entrance sign from the New York Stock Exchange Building, which Rick immediately rejects after identifying a misprint; an antique big-game rifle; a set of Supreme skateboard decks; and a 1972 Norman Rockwell letter and print. Also, Rick decides to generate more money for the shop by starting live online auctions.
640	13	"Darting and Dodging"	November 2, 2022
Items appraised include a Jimi Hendrix poster for his song, "Voodoo Chile"; a collection of Yu-Gi-Oh! trading cards; a Valdivian stone votive owl; a Harry and the Hendersons doll; a 1968 Dodge Dart convertible; an oreodont skull fossil; and an original set of blueprints to Disney California Adventure.

=== Season 21 (2023) ===
No. overall	No. in season	Title	Original release date
641	1	"Battle-Pawn"	March 15, 2023
Items appraised include two framed World War I posters; a fossilized Dimetrodon hand; a 1949 General Electric television; a He-Man battle cat spring bouncer; a large photograph of Yosemite Firefall taken by Chumlee's friend, local photographer William Carr; a pair of ancient Roman bronze figurines; a set of Disney pre-production proof pins; a Sega Lost in Space pinball machine; and a 19th-century brass fireman's megaphone. Also, Chumlee takes Rick and Corey on a camping trip to take some pictures to sell after getting inspired by William's photography business.
642	2	"The Pawnerator"	March 22, 2023
Items appraised include an 1843 Hall-North carbine; a 1930s Emerson radio designed by Walt Disney; two 1960s NFL pennants with an old football player doll; a vintage Aero Jet Range Rocket toy; a signed first edition copy of Arnold Schwarzenegger's Arnold: The Education of a Bodybuilder; a 1950s Jerry Mahoney ventriloquist dummy, which Rick buys for himself to annoy Corey; an autographed The Sandlot poster; and a pair of Chinese stone statues.
643	3	"Rarer Than Hen's Teeth"	March 29, 2023
Items appraised include a set of tyrannosaur teeth; a Mark Buehrle Chicago White Sox jersey signed by himself and some of his teammates and coaches that were part of his perfect game; an AquaPed prototype; a collection of M*A*S*H action figures; a pair of Air France posters painted by Guy Georget; a wardrobe collection owned by country singer Tanya Tucker; a set of 1861 Harvard University banknotes; and a Sauer & Sohn shotgun, which Rick immediately rejects after realizing it is from 1969.
644	4	"Detective Rick Tracy"	April 5, 2023
Items appraised include a Supreme x Louis Vuitton parka; an invitation to Los Angeles Lakers point guard Magic Johnson's 50th birthday celebration; an original Dennis the Menace poster signed by Hank Ketcham; a pair of Joker cards from the 2008 film The Dark Knight; a Civil War-era derringer; a 1948 Dick Tracy watch; a huge collection of vintage toys; and a set of miniature World War II battleships.
645	5	"Chum Goes to Hollywood"	April 12, 2023
Items appraised include a football helmet signed by 28 Heisman Trophy winners; a Transformers Devastator; an Aztec death whistle; an antique wooden lion's head chair; an original 1951 Strangers on a Train movie poster; and a pair of Fraggle Rock toy guitars. Also, Chumlee returns to Los Angeles and visits the Formosa Cafe to check out a collection of vintage jackets.
646	6	"The Mad Pawner"	April 19, 2023
Items appraised include a first edition copy of Lewis Carroll's Alice's Adventures in Wonderland; a pair of Nike Air Yeezy 2 Red October shoes; a 1982 Sharp pocket computer; a set of Gorillaz figurines; a Casablanca movie poster with a set of autographs by the movie's stars; an 1814 statement of revenue from the United States Department of the Treasury; a pistol rocket rescue set from World War II; a Ringling Bros. and Barnum & Bailey Circus clown jacket; and an 1887 Ted Kennedy baseball card.
647	7	"The Rick-Sy Rebellion"	April 26, 2023
Items appraised include an energy dome designed by Devo, which is brought in by Spencer; a copy of Spirit #22; a pair of wall decorations from the Excalibur Hotel and Casino; a 1986 Slammy Award sample; a whiskey decanter set said to be owned by Buffalo Bill; a 1947 Bally's baseball pinball machine; an 1875 fluting machine; and a 1914 panoramic map book of Southern California. Also, Chumlee's friend Santos is promoted to a full-time position, and Rick tasks the rest of the full-time staff to train him. Meanwhile, Rick returns to San Diego to check out a painting from a medieval book of hours, a game book by Edmond Hoyle that was printed in 1796, and a 1792 letter about the Whiskey Rebellion written by George Washington, all of which are presented by one of his most loyal clients, book collector Adam.
648	8	"May the Miniforce Be With You"	May 3, 2023
Items appraised include a plaster model head sculpted by James Earle Fraser to design the Buffalo nickel; two one-of-a-kind Lego Star Wars minifigures; two pairs of chopsticks and a set of Year of the Dog envelopes made by Louis Vuitton to commemorate the Lunar New Year; a 1917 French loan poster by Paul-Albert Besnard; a pair of wrestling boots said to be owned by Booker T; a wooden 1939 Lincoln-Zephyr styling model; and a pair of autographed albums by Fleetwood Mac and Elton John. Chumlee buys the boots for $3,000 without getting them authenticated, and irritates Rick even further by ordering pink staff shirts to honor the former's dog, Pinky. Rick and Chumlee travel to Houston to look at a collection of art and get the boots authenticated by Booker T himself, who not only confirms they are his, but also gives Chumlee a wrestling lesson.
649	9	"Jumpin' Jake Flash"	May 10, 2023
Items appraised include a 1937 Federation bicycle; a set of Muppet replicas; an 1800s autograph book; a pair of pants said to be worn by Keith Richards in the 1968 concert film The Rolling Stones Rock and Roll Circus; a set of bulla seals from the Byzantine Empire; and a broadside from the Battle of Bunker Hill. Also, Rick returns to Los Angeles to visit his collector friend David's new store.
650	10	"Thunder Pawns"	May 17, 2023
Items appraised include a 1928 cast-iron GOP elephant; a copy of Willa Cather's O Pioneers!; a 1946 Goofy and Donald Duck wind-up toy; a collection of 1963 Mister Softee trading cards; a hockey stick signed by Paul Newman; a 1970s Rolex Submariner watch; a set of Bolivian thunder mugs; and a World War I-era drum, which is brought in by Spencer.
651	11	"The Big Dig"	May 24, 2023
Items appraised include a Mr. T wall clock; a Japanese officer's sword from World War II; a prop credit card from the 2006 James Bond film Casino Royale; a 1950s atomic cannon toy; a set of fossilized bones; a 1960s San Diego Chargers cheerleader's uniform; and a signed copy of Frank Zappa and The Mothers' album Fillmore East – June 1971. Rick and Chumlee buy the bones for $1,000 and meet up with their paleontologist friend Andre in Texas to have the bones examined. Andre reveals that the bones form the hand of a Permian animal valued at up to $5,000; he then teaches the duo how to dig for fossils.
652	12	"Heerre's Corey!"	June 7, 2023
Items appraised include a pair of antique Tiffany & Co. candlesticks; a 1985 Swatch watch designed by Keith Haring; a 1980 letter signed by Stephen King; an 1869 survey map of San Francisco; an antique newspaper picture acting machine; a Mauser C96 pistol; an autographed Steve Aoki Funko Pop and trading cards, which are authenticated by Aoki himself; and a French movie poster for the 1969 James Bond film On Her Majesty's Secret Service.
653	13	"Siegfried and Rick"	June 14, 2023
Items appraised include a Spuds MacKenzie Bud Light neon sign; an Eleanor Roosevelt autograph; a Samsonite sample suitcase; a framed page from the Breeches Bible; a 1950s IBM vacuum tube computer module; a Mercedes-Benz SLS AMG said to be owned by Siegfried & Roy; and a Civil War-era amputation kit. Also, Chumlee visits a Hollywood prop house in Los Angeles, where he checks out a hand mirror that was featured in the 2002 film Gangs of New York.
654	14	"The Big Kahuna"	June 21, 2023
Items appraised include a Duke Kahanamoku Joker card; a prop envelope from the Harry Potter film series; a Winchester Model 1866 rifle; a pair of chairs designed by Christopher Guy Harrison; a 1908 payroll book from the Union Pacific Railroad; a 1766 anti-Stamp Act button; a Strange Tales comic book signed by Stan Lee; and a collection of memorabilia related to Van Halen's song, "Hot for Teacher". Also, Chumlee decides that he needs his own office, so he tries to set one up in the shop's second floor hallway.
655	15	"A Surreally Good Deal"	June 28, 2023
Items appraised include a five-time platinum award presented to Journey when five million copies of their album, Escape, were sold; a limited edition Final Fantasy digital watch made by Seiko; a 1931 reaper model; a painting by René Magritte; a French zinc bull head; a jersey made for New England Patriots quarterback Tom Brady during the 2013 Pro Bowl; and a 1920s toy fire truck. The Magritte painting's seller has no paperwork to confirm if the painting is real, and Rick's art expert, Chad, states that since the three of them can neither confirm nor deny the painting's value, they have to travel to Belgium and get it examined by a committee that specializes in Magritte art. Rick takes a gamble by buying the painting for $10,000 and taking it to Belgium. While waiting to hear back from the committee, Rick checks out a gaming table owned by Louis XVI and a 1691 cabinet, both of which he buys for a total of $825,000. He also checks out a collection of Belgian military antiques.

=== Season 22 (2024) ===
No. overall	No. in season	Title	Original release date
656	1	"Choose Your Wea-pawn"	July 10, 2024
Items appraised include a collection of celebrity photos taken by Frank Worth; a silver concho belt; a signed copy of USA for Africa's 1985 single, "We Are the World"; a 1907 Saint-Gaudens double eagle $20 gold coin; a pair of 1800s Italian pistols, which Corey immediately identifies as fakes and rejects; an ancient Chinese hand cannon; and a Maytag washing machine salesman sample. Also, Rick travels to Los Angeles to meet up with actor Adam Carolla, who is looking to sell a British 1972 Ford Escort race car owned and driven by Paul Newman.
657	2	"Zigging and Zagging"	July 17, 2024
Items appraised include a set of vintage Marx toys and an unused life ration kit from World War II brought in by Spencer; a jewelry set made entirely out of ancient gold coins; a Zig Zag box; a set of original handwritten lyrics to John Entwistle's "I'm So Scared"; a military document signed by Benedict Arnold; a BraveStarr toy laser gun; a collection of Hollywood wardrobes and scripts; and a World War I pilot's footlocker that belonged to the seller's great-grandfather.
658	3	"Where the Pawn Stars Roam"	July 24, 2024
Items appraised include an antique glass float; a Corythosaurus fossil; an original painting by Ralph Steadman to promote the 1980 film Where the Buffalo Roam; an ancient Roman brass figurehead; a pocket watch ribbon and jar wrench commemorating the 150th anniversary of the Liberty Bell; an antique wheellock puffer pistol; a Luke Skywalker landspeeder; and a limited edition screen print of the Friends cast by Mr. Brainwash.
659	4	"Dream Pawn"	August 7, 2024
Items appraised include a Princess Leia skateboard deck signed by Carrie Fisher; an unopened Halo: Combat Evolved Xbox video game; a portrait of Sergeant Stubby; a 1797 George Washington Masonic medal; an original 1973 Magnum Force poster; and a D'Angelico guitar signed by Joe Perry of Aerosmith. Also, Chumlee returns to Los Angeles to look at a collection of vintage Versace clothing.
660	5	"Pawns N' Roses"	August 14, 2024
Items appraised include a customized Gibson Les Paul guitar owned by DJ Ashba, which is authenticated by Ashba himself; an 1867 cast iron stove; an eight-volume Sherlock Holmes book set; a copy of Wilbur Comics #7; an 1855 map of Utah and New Mexico; three autographed pop-culture pinball machines; a World War II howitzer mule pack saddle; and a shirt and Roland CUBE amplifier from David Bowie's 1978 world tour.
661	6	"You're a Good Man, Chumlee Russell"	August 21, 2024
Items appraised include a military payment certificate; a Papa Shango prototype action figure, along with a blueprint for the figure, both of which are authenticated by The Godfather himself; an artist's proof by Jerry Garcia; a 1960s gold lighter from the Cal Neva Lodge & Casino; an autographed 1961 Jerry West rookie card; a Fiesta dinnerware set; a prototype Pasqually head; an antique double-barreled knife pistol; and a first press copy of the soundtrack to the 1965 Christmas TV special A Charlie Brown Christmas.
662	7	"Say Hello to My Little Caddy"	August 28, 2024
Items appraised include a Chicago Bears football and helmet signed by the 1985 team, the winners of Super Bowl XX; an early 1900s time clock, a collection of ancient Aztec figurines; three 1950s B movie posters; a bronze bust of Michael Jordan; a collection of old Marvel comic books; a set of lawn darts; a 1963 Cadillac Series 62 convertible restored to resemble the one that was featured in the 1983 film Scarface; and an early architecture drawing of the New York-New York Hotel and Casino.
663	8	"Extrasensory Pawn-ception"	September 4, 2024
Items appraised include a banner from the Rolling Stones' Tour of the Americas '75; a 1950s Kromex kitchenware set; a Teenage Mutant Ninja Turtles prototype action figure, along with the actual figure it was based on; an 1800s Irish flintlock pistol; an architect model of the Desert Inn; a 1970 long-exposure photo taken by Robert Werling; a toy tram commemorating the 1933 World's Fair; a Kreskin's ESP board game; and a framed collection of Herbert Hoover memorabilia.
664	9	"Boyz II Pawn Stars"	September 18, 2024
Items appraised include a collection of Sandy Koufax memorabilia; a limited edition print by Mark Ryden; a signed vinyl copy of Boyz II Men's debut album, Cooleyhighharmony, along with a sheepskin jacket that was worn by Michael McCary on the album's cover, both of which are authenticated by band member Wanya Morris; an ancient pottery bowl; a large original French poster for the 1956 film Nero's Mistress; a set of badges from Shirley Temple's estate; a pair of 19th-century patent documents; two 1952 comic books by Charles M. Schulz; and an ancient Chinese vase.
665	10	"The 30 Million Dollar Deal"	September 25, 2024
The holy grail of items in the history of the show is featured as Rick meets up with a representative of a man who is looking to sell a 1933 double eagle $20 gold coin. Unfortunately, when Rick offers $25 million for the coin, the representative states that his client is adamant at selling it for over $30 million. Additional items appraised include an American flag that flew on Independence Hall during the United States Bicentennial; a diorama of Disneyland Main Street, USA; an original screener for the first film in the Battlestar Galactica franchise; a pair of 2011 Nike Air Jordan 5 shoes designed and signed by Tinker Hatfield; a 1970s model of a 1957 Chevrolet Bel Air car; three antique typewriters; an 1840s Japanese ornamental matchlock; and an autographed Once Upon a Time in Hollywood movie poster.

=== Season 23 (2025) ===
No. overall	No. in season	Title	Original release date
666	1	"Pawn It to My Heart"	January 22, 2025
Items appraised include a Bigelow Aerospace salesman sample; a Darth Vader nutcracker; a custom bass guitar said to have been hand-built by Jimmy D'Aquisto; a hot fudge sign from the first franchised Ben & Jerry's store; a set of tickets to the final round of the 1981 Formula One World Championship at Caesars Palace; a tribal axe and currency stone from Papua New Guinea; a 1970 plaque awarded to Porter Wagoner and Dolly Parton when they were named Vocal Duet of the Year by Music City News (with Parton's last name misspelled as "Patron"), which the seller purchased at Wagoner's estate sale; and a limited edition pair of Minnie Mouse ears designed by Heidi Klum. Also, Rick receives an early invitation from pop icon Taylor Dayne to her upcoming wardrobe auction commemorating the 35th anniversary of her career before the auction goes live. He ends up buying a bra that was created for her Can't Fight Fate tour for $1,500. Later, Chumlee asks Rick to help him taste three new ice cream flavors he created to sell at his candy shop.
667	2	"Just Pawn It"	January 29, 2025
Items appraised include an 1864 Civil War sign; a 1908 sterling silver racing trophy; a bulldog sculpture by William Sweetlove; a fossilized whale vertebra; a 1975 Bricklin SV-1 car; a collection of limited edition Disney dresses; an antique Kropatschek rifle; a Nike boat kit and briefcase that were both never released to the public, which inspire Chumlee to create promotional items for the shop's employees; and a 1939 Shyvers multiphone.
668	3	"Pawn Barons"	February 5, 2025
Items appraised include a vintage Keystone Capri camera said to have shot the first color footage of Elvis Presley; an object that appears to be a fossilized turtle shell, but turns out to be just a mud concretion; a Standard Oil stock certificate signed by John D. Rockefeller; a jacket worn by Cesar Romero, along with an autographed photo of him and a framed The Cisco Kid and the Lady poster; a postcard handwritten by Patsy Cline; three 1970s Omega SA watches; a pair of Mike Tyson vs. Evander Holyfield fight tickets; a Louis Vuitton mahjong set, which Chumlee immediately identifies as a fake and rejects; and a collection of pop music test pressings.
669	4	"No More Mr. Nice Buys"	February 12, 2025
Items appraised include a torch from the 1988 Winter Olympics; a Deadpool Pez statue made by Funko; an outfit said to be worn by Alice Cooper, along with a staff T-shirt from his Lace and Whiskey tour; a World War II-era knuckle knife; two uncut MetaZoo sample sheets; a 1915 Cuban five-peso gold coin; a collection of World Series programs from the 1930s and 1940s; an anatomical foot model that belonged to William Scholl; and a Batman Forever SNES protoype video game cartridge, along with the actual game it was based on.
670	5	"Everything from Pawn to Nuts"	February 26, 2025
Items appraised include a 1970s Gibson ES-150 jazz guitar, the first commercially available electric guitar; a golf token and picture by Karl Hubenthal that were both owned by Wilbur Clark, the founder of the Desert Inn; a pillowcase commemorating the Boston Red Sox's victory in the 1915 World Series; a yearbook page signed by James Dean; a set of The Smiths studio albums; a Salvador Dalí screenprint from the Disney short film Destino; an ancient Roman table, which Rick immediately determines to be from the early 1900s and rejects; a chef's uniform signed by Larry Thomas, who played "The Soup Nazi" in the TV series Seinfeld; and a set of 1990s Philips audio equipment.
671	6	"E.T. Phone Chum"	March 5, 2025
Items appraised include a 1933 Famous Funnies comic book; a collection of Super Bowl commemorative coin dies; an E.T. the Extra-Terrestrial printer's proof movie poster; an 8.44-carat dog-shaped diamond; a Civil War-era Lindsay double-barreled rifle; a framed piece of mail that was carried on the Spirit of St. Louis, piloted by Charles Lindbergh in 1928; a 1956 World Series baseball signed by the New York Yankees' Hall of Famers from that series; a calling card that belonged to Mary Harlan Lincoln, the daughter-in-law of Abraham Lincoln, which inspires Rick to create some of his own calling cards; and a 1940 Superman pinback.
672	7	"Leggo My Death Star"	March 12, 2025
Items appraised include a collection of recordings of some of Franklin D. Roosevelt's speeches; a promotional sample pair of Air Jordan 5 Supreme shoes; an unopened Lego Star Wars Death Star set; a portrait of Pablo Picasso by Salvador Dalí, which inspires Chumlee to start taking art lessons and leads to him drawing an insulting portrait of Rick; a 1950s Coca-Cola school crossing guard sign; a 1948 National cash register; a Civil War-era revolver; a Mansion of Happiness board game; and a surfboard that was awarded to Vince Vaughn and Jennifer Aniston by the Teen Choice Awards for their starring roles in the 2006 film The Break-Up.
673	8	"Gold and Silver Horde"	March 19, 2025
Items appraised include a small collection of gold dollar coins from the Great Kentucky Hoard; an autographed Pee-wee Herman figurine; an antique spirit clock; a 1979 Royal Ride golf cart; an original The Goonies movie poster; a signed first edition copy of Charles M. Schulz's 1970 autobiography, Charlie Brown and Charlie Schulz; a factory-sealed box of 1994 X-Men trading cards; a Gretsch sparkle snare drum; and an unopened sweatband signed by former NFL quarterback Jim McMahon.
674	9	"Three Ring Pawn"	March 26, 2025
Items appraised include a 1959 Gretsch bass guitar; a pair of Nike SB Zoo York shoes; a set of antique pull-apart circus toys; a GMT Master Rolex watch with a Pepsi can design; a signed gold record award presented to the Righteous Brothers when one million copies of their single, "You've Lost That Lovin' Feelin'", were sold; a pair of Victorian story padlocks; antique salesman samples of a cream separator and a scale, which Rick says are actually cast-iron toys; an 1865 Palmer rifle; a Hopalong Cassidy playset; and a $50 Disney bill and pin commemorating the 50th anniversary of Disneyland.
675	10	"The Champ Pays a Call"	April 2, 2025
Items appraised include a collection of signed skateboard decks; a collection of 1980 Presidential Picker coins; a 1962 Fender Jaguar guitar; a 1920s telephone table and chair said to be built by Oscar Bach; a Golden State Warriors jersey worn and signed by point guard Stephen Curry from the 2021–22 season; a large vintage pair of Kowa binoculars; a speed bag signed by Jon Voight; a copy of Mastering the Art of French Cooking signed by Julia and Paul Cushing Child; and two milk glass etchings by William Preston Snyder and Frederic Remington. Rick buys the Voight-signed speed bag for $250 and has it authenticated by Voight himself, who confirms the signature is his over dinner; Rick also reveals to Corey and Chumlee that he had a small part in the 2024 film Reagan, which also starred Voight, but Rick's part was cut from the finished film.

=== Season 24 (2026) ===
No. overall	No. in season	Title	Original release date
676	1	"Where the Wild Things Pawn"	January 7, 2026
677	2	"A Gold and Silver Ticket"	January 14, 2026
678	3	"Look What You Made Me Pawn"	January 21, 2026
679	4	"Rock n' Roll Soles"	January 28, 2026
680	5	"Citizen Pawn"	February 4, 2026
681	6	"Raking in the Dough"	February 18, 2026
682	7	"Man I Feel Like a Pawn Star!"	February 25, 2026
683	8	"Pinky's Day Out"	March 4, 2026
684	9	"Shoot for the Pawn Stars"	March 11, 2026
685	10	"Rick's Showcase"	March 18, 2026

=== Season 25 (2026) ===
No. overall	No. in season	Title	Original release date
686	1	"The Flight Stuff"	October 7, 2026

== Home releases ==
Pawn Stars The Complete Season 1
Set details			DVD Layout
14 episodes; 2-disc DVD set; 1.66:1 non-anamorphic aspect ratio; Languages: English (Dolby Digital 2.0 Stereo)			DISC ONE: Boom or Bust / Confederate Conundrum / Sink or Sell / Knights in Fake Armor? / Gangsters & Guitars / Damn Yankees / Brothels & Busses; DISC TWO: Time Machines / Rope a Dope / Rick's Big Bet / John Hancock's Hancock / Plane Crazy / Peaches & Pinups / Old Man's Gamble / Bonus
DVD release dates			DISC ONE: Boom or Bust / Confederate Conundrum / Sink or Sell / Knights in Fake Armor? / Gangsters & Guitars / Damn Yankees / Brothels & Busses; DISC TWO: Time Machines / Rope a Dope / Rick's Big Bet / John Hancock's Hancock / Plane Crazy / Peaches & Pinups / Old Man's Gamble / Bonus
Region 1	Region 2	Region 4	DISC ONE: Boom or Bust / Confederate Conundrum / Sink or Sell / Knights in Fake Armor? / Gangsters & Guitars / Damn Yankees / Brothels & Busses; DISC TWO: Time Machines / Rope a Dope / Rick's Big Bet / John Hancock's Hancock / Plane Crazy / Peaches & Pinups / Old Man's Gamble / Bonus
January 26, 2010	March 22, 2010	—N/a	DISC ONE: Boom or Bust / Confederate Conundrum / Sink or Sell / Knights in Fake Armor? / Gangsters & Guitars / Damn Yankees / Brothels & Busses; DISC TWO: Time Machines / Rope a Dope / Rick's Big Bet / John Hancock's Hancock / Plane Crazy / Peaches & Pinups / Old Man's Gamble / Bonus

Pawn Stars Season 2
Set details			DVD Layout
32 episodes; 4-disc DVD set; 1.66:1 non-anamorphic aspect ratio; Languages: English (Dolby Digital 2.0 Stereo)			DISC ONE: Fired Up / Sharks and Cobras / Old Man's Booty / A Shot and a Shave / Hot Air Buffoon / Steaks at Stake / A Christmas Special / Secret Santa / Pawn Shop Pinot; DISC TWO: Bikes and Blades / Rick's Bad Day / Chum Goes AWOL / Wheels / Shocking Chum / Pezzed Off / Guns and Rangers / Tattoos and Tantrums; DISC THREE: Pinball Wizards / Chopper Gamble / Spooning Paul Revere / Off The Wagon / Fortune in Flames / Backroom Brawl / Big Guns / Flight of the Chum; DISC FOUR: Bumpy Ride / Helmet Head / Bow Legged / Hell Week / ZZZZZZ / The British Are Coming / License to Pawn / Bonus
DVD release dates
Region 1	Region 2	Region 4	
August 24, 2010	April 16, 2012	—N/a	

Pawn Stars Volume 3
Set details (Note: The picture of DVD cover shows that the set is called "Pawn Stars Volume 3", even though it is listed as Season 3.) (Note: Note: The episodes up to and including "Chummobile" are included in Volume 3 on iTunes, with the remaining episodes selling as Season 4.)			DVD Layout
16 episodes; 3-disc DVD set; 1.66:1 non-anamorphic aspect ratio; Languages: English (Dolby Digital 2.0 Stereo)			DISC ONE: Trail Breaker / Top Secret / Whale of a Time / Gold Diggers / Aw Shucks! / Deals From Hell / Chumlee's Dummies / Strike, Spare, BOOM; DISC TWO: Message in a Bottle / Rough Riders / Phoning It In / Moon Walking / Peeping Pawn / Ace in the Hole / Double Trouble / Getting A Head; BONUS DISC: The Pick, The Pawn, & The Polish
DVD release dates			DISC ONE: Trail Breaker / Top Secret / Whale of a Time / Gold Diggers / Aw Shucks! / Deals From Hell / Chumlee's Dummies / Strike, Spare, BOOM; DISC TWO: Message in a Bottle / Rough Riders / Phoning It In / Moon Walking / Peeping Pawn / Ace in the Hole / Double Trouble / Getting A Head; BONUS DISC: The Pick, The Pawn, & The Polish
Region 1	Region 2	Region 4	DISC ONE: Trail Breaker / Top Secret / Whale of a Time / Gold Diggers / Aw Shucks! / Deals From Hell / Chumlee's Dummies / Strike, Spare, BOOM; DISC TWO: Message in a Bottle / Rough Riders / Phoning It In / Moon Walking / Peeping Pawn / Ace in the Hole / Double Trouble / Getting A Head; BONUS DISC: The Pick, The Pawn, & The Polish
October 18, 2011	—N/a	—N/a	DISC ONE: Trail Breaker / Top Secret / Whale of a Time / Gold Diggers / Aw Shucks! / Deals From Hell / Chumlee's Dummies / Strike, Spare, BOOM; DISC TWO: Message in a Bottle / Rough Riders / Phoning It In / Moon Walking / Peeping Pawn / Ace in the Hole / Double Trouble / Getting A Head; BONUS DISC: The Pick, The Pawn, & The Polish

Pawn Stars Volume 4
Set details			DVD Layout
16 episodes; 3-disc DVD set; 1.66:1 non-anamorphic aspect ratio; Languages: English (Dolby Digital 2.0 Stereo)			DISC ONE: Cornering the Colonel / Ready, Set, Pawn / The Eagle Has Landed / Like a Rolling Chum / Hello Nurse / Chumdog Millionaire / Gone With the Schwinn / Bare Bones; DISC TWO: Never Surrender / Honest Abe / Monkey Business / Packing Heat / Luck of the Draw / Houdini's Handcuffs / Pedal to the Medal / Case Closed; BONUS: Includes exclusive sneak peek bonus episode of Cajun Pawn Stars
DVD release dates			DISC ONE: Cornering the Colonel / Ready, Set, Pawn / The Eagle Has Landed / Like a Rolling Chum / Hello Nurse / Chumdog Millionaire / Gone With the Schwinn / Bare Bones; DISC TWO: Never Surrender / Honest Abe / Monkey Business / Packing Heat / Luck of the Draw / Houdini's Handcuffs / Pedal to the Medal / Case Closed; BONUS: Includes exclusive sneak peek bonus episode of Cajun Pawn Stars
Region 1	Region 2	Region 4	DISC ONE: Cornering the Colonel / Ready, Set, Pawn / The Eagle Has Landed / Like a Rolling Chum / Hello Nurse / Chumdog Millionaire / Gone With the Schwinn / Bare Bones; DISC TWO: Never Surrender / Honest Abe / Monkey Business / Packing Heat / Luck of the Draw / Houdini's Handcuffs / Pedal to the Medal / Case Closed; BONUS: Includes exclusive sneak peek bonus episode of Cajun Pawn Stars
June 5, 2012	—N/a	—N/a	DISC ONE: Cornering the Colonel / Ready, Set, Pawn / The Eagle Has Landed / Like a Rolling Chum / Hello Nurse / Chumdog Millionaire / Gone With the Schwinn / Bare Bones; DISC TWO: Never Surrender / Honest Abe / Monkey Business / Packing Heat / Luck of the Draw / Houdini's Handcuffs / Pedal to the Medal / Case Closed; BONUS: Includes exclusive sneak peek bonus episode of Cajun Pawn Stars

Pawn Stars Volume 5
Set details			DVD Layout
16 episodes; 2-disc DVD set; 1.66:1 non-anamorphic aspect ratio; Languages: English (Dolby Digital 2.0 Stereo)			DISC ONE: Darth Pawn / Put Up Your Dukes / Pawn Illustrated / Striking a Chord / Harrison for President / Wise Guys / Robosaurus / Ah, Shoot!; DISC TWO: Going Postal / Chummobile / Evel Genius / Pablo Pawncasso / Sub for Sale / Missile Attack / Not On My Watch / Take a Seat
DVD release dates			DISC ONE: Darth Pawn / Put Up Your Dukes / Pawn Illustrated / Striking a Chord / Harrison for President / Wise Guys / Robosaurus / Ah, Shoot!; DISC TWO: Going Postal / Chummobile / Evel Genius / Pablo Pawncasso / Sub for Sale / Missile Attack / Not On My Watch / Take a Seat
Region 1	Region 2	Region 4	DISC ONE: Darth Pawn / Put Up Your Dukes / Pawn Illustrated / Striking a Chord / Harrison for President / Wise Guys / Robosaurus / Ah, Shoot!; DISC TWO: Going Postal / Chummobile / Evel Genius / Pablo Pawncasso / Sub for Sale / Missile Attack / Not On My Watch / Take a Seat
August 14, 2012	—N/a	—N/a	DISC ONE: Darth Pawn / Put Up Your Dukes / Pawn Illustrated / Striking a Chord / Harrison for President / Wise Guys / Robosaurus / Ah, Shoot!; DISC TWO: Going Postal / Chummobile / Evel Genius / Pablo Pawncasso / Sub for Sale / Missile Attack / Not On My Watch / Take a Seat
