= National Register of Historic Places listings in Union County, Illinois =

Location of Union County in Illinois

This is a list of the National Register of Historic Places listings in Union County, Illinois.

This is intended to be a complete list of the properties and districts on the National Register of Historic Places in Union County, Illinois, United States. Latitude and longitude coordinates are provided for many National Register properties and districts; these locations may be seen together in a map.

There are 9 properties and districts listed on the National Register in the county. Another property was once listed but has been removed.

This National Park Service list is complete through NPS recent listings posted June 6, 2026.

== Current listings ==
	Name on the Register	Image	Date listed	Location	City or town	Description
1	Campground Church and Cemetery Site	Campground Church and Cemetery Site	May 8, 2017 (#100000965)	50 Tunnel Ln. 37°27′39″N 89°08′19″W	Anna	
2	Giant City State Park Lodge and Cabins	Giant City State Park Lodge and Cabins	March 4, 1985 (#85002403)	RR #1; 37°35′32″N 89°11′00″W	Makanda	
3	Rendleman Orchards		September 4, 2025 (#100012200)	9680 State Route 127; 37°35′43″N 89°19′19″W	Alto Pass	
4	St. Anne's Episcopal Church	St. Anne's Episcopal Church	February 5, 2003 (#02001758)	507 S. Main St. 37°27′28″N 89°15′11″W	Anna	
5	St. Paulus Evangelisch Lutherischen Gemeinde	St. Paulus Evangelisch Lutherischen Gemeinde	November 24, 1980 (#80001413)	South of Jonesboro off Illinois Route 127; 37°24′56″N 89°16′31″W	Jonesboro	
6	Stinson Memorial Library	Stinson Memorial Library	June 9, 1978 (#78001193)	409 S. Main St. 37°27′30″N 89°15′06″W	Anna	
7	Thompson Brothers Rock Art	Thompson Brothers Rock Art	December 29, 2015 (#15000933)	Giant City Nature Trail; 37°35′42″N 89°11′36″W	Makanda	
8	Union Lookout	Union Lookout	February 5, 2003 (#02001759)	¾ miles south of the junction of County Road 13 and Trail of Tears State Forest Rd. 37°28′44″N 89°21′28″W	Jonesboro	
9	Ware Mounds and Village Site	Ware Mounds and Village Site	October 18, 1977 (#77000490)	West of the junction of Illinois Routes 3 and 146 at Ware; 37°26′47″N 89°24′00″W	Ware	

=== Former listing ===
	Name on the Register	Image	Date listed	Date removed	Location	City or town	Description
1	Willard House		September 8, 1976 (#76000730)	February 7, 1978	608 S. Main St.	Anna	

== See also ==
- List of National Historic Landmarks in Illinois
- National Register of Historic Places listings in Illinois
