= Anna Pottery =

American pottery company

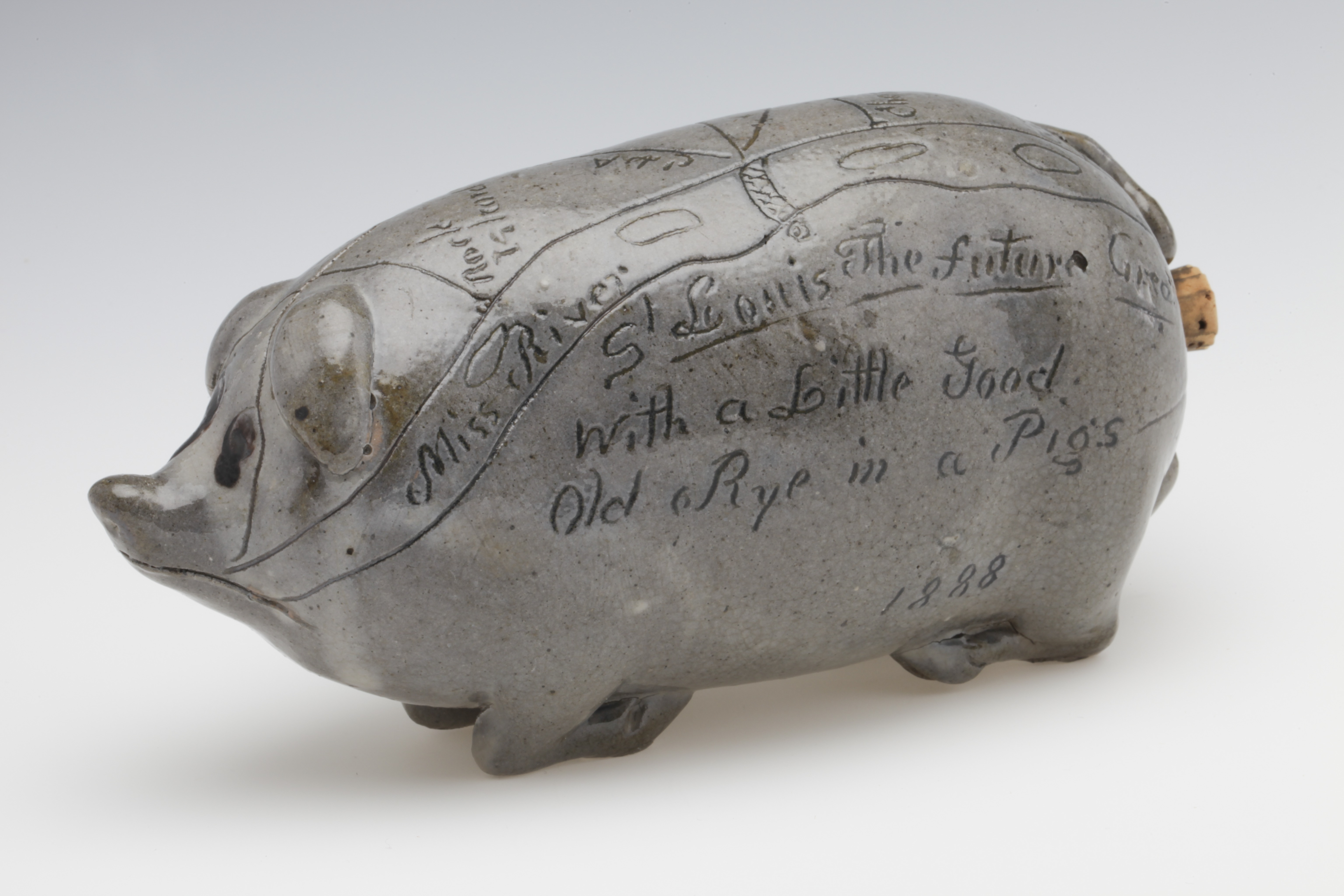
- Gray pottery flask, 1888
- Type: Private
- Industry: Ceramics
- Founded: 1859
- Founders: Cornwall Kirkpatrick, and W. Wallace Kirkpatrick
- Defunct: 1910
- Headquarters: Anna, Illinois, U.S.
- Area served: Midwest

Anna Pottery was a pottery located in the city of Anna in Union County, Illinois, from 1859 to 1910. They sold stoneware and white clay ware.

== History ==
The brothers Cornwall Kirkpatrick and W. Wallace Kirkpatrick founded the pottery, after moving from Mound City and Washington, Pennsylvania.

They exhibited at the 1876 Philadelphia Centennial and 1893 World's Columbian Exposition.

== Legacy ==
Their work is held in the collections of the Missouri History Museum, Illinois State Museum, Metropolitan Museum of Art, and Winterthur Museum, Garden and Library.

In 2018, a "snake jug" sold at auction for $141,000.

In 2021, Winterthur Museum acquired the “Liberty Monument” piece. It depicts the Colfax Massacre.
