= Wolf Lake, Illinois =

- Unincorporated community
- Location within Illinois
- Coordinates: 37°30′15″N 89°26′18″W
- Country: United States
- State: Illinois
- County: Union
- Elevation: 354 ft (108 m)
- Time zone: UTC-6 (Central (CST))
  - Summer (DST): UTC-5 (CDT)
- ZIP code: 62998
- Area code: 618
- GNIS feature ID: 421392

Wolf Lake is an unincorporated community in Union County, Illinois, United States. The community is located on Illinois Route 3 between the Big Muddy River to the north and Ware to the south. It is about 3 miles (4.8 km) east of the Mississippi River. The nearest incorporated city to Wolf Lake is Jonesboro, which is about 10 miles (16 km) southeast. Cape Girardeau, Missouri is about 10 miles (16 km) to the south-southwest. Total population for Wolf Lake's ZIP code (62998) was 357 in 2020.

== Background ==
Wolf Lake is located in the rural, predominantly agricultural floodplain of the Mississippi River. The Big Five Levee System, an earthen embankment with an average height of 14 feet (4.3 m), reduces the risk of flooding from the Mississippi River and tributaries. The Union Pacific Railroad and Illinois Route 3 run in parallel through the community. The community of Wolf Lake is south-southwest of the waterbody of the same name. The Shawnee National Forest is located east of the community and the lake. On top of part of the bluff that overlooks Wolf Lake is a federally designated Research Natural Area and National Natural Landmark, LaRue-Pine Hills Ecological Area.

== Economy ==
Wolf Lake's economy is predominantly agricultural, driven by the production of soybeans and corn on alluvial soil types classified as prime farmland. Major non-agricultural employers in the area include explosives manufacturer Dyno-Nobel (formerly Trojan Powder Company and Ensign-Bickford Company) and Shawnee Community School District #84.

== Education ==
- Shawnee Community School District #84 has one school in Wolf Lake serving pre-kindergarten through 12th grade students from Wolf Lake and nearby communities of Grand Tower, Ware, McClure and East Cape Girardeau.
