= Buzbee =

Buzbee is a surname. Notable people with the surname include:

- Alex Buzbee (born 1985), American football player
- Kenneth Buzbee (born 1937), American politician and businessman
- Lewis Buzbee (born 1957), American author and poet
- Minnie A. Buzbee (1880–1955), American advertising executive
- Sally Buzbee (born 1965), American journalist
- Tony Buzbee (born 1968), American lawyer and politician
