= Mill Creek, Illinois =

Mill Creek
- Village
- Location of Mill Creek in Union County, Illinois.

- Location of Illinois in the United States
- Coordinates: 37°20′30″N 89°15′09″W
- Country: United States
- State: Illinois
- County: Union

Area
  - Total: 0.38 sq mi (0.99 km^{2})
  - Land: 0.37 sq mi (0.97 km^{2})
  - Water: 0.0077 sq mi (0.02 km^{2})
- Elevation: 377 ft (115 m)

Population (2020)
  - Total: 59
  - Density: 156.9/sq mi (60.59/km^{2})
- Time zone: UTC-6 (CST)
  - Summer (DST): UTC-5 (CDT)
- ZIP Code(s): 62952
- Area code: 618
- FIPS code: 17-49178

Mill Creek is a village in Union County, Illinois, United States. The population was 59 at the 2020 census.

== Geography ==
The community is located on the west side of the Mill Creek floodplain just north of the Union-Alexander county line. Illinois Route 127 passes through the town connecting to Jonesboro approximately seven miles to the north and Cairo about 24 miles to the south.

According to the 2010 census, Mill Creek has a total area of 0.386 square miles (1.00 km^{2}), of which 0.38 square miles (0.98 km^{2}) (or 98.45%) is land and 0.006 square miles (0.02 km^{2}) (or 1.55%) is water.

== Demographics ==
Historical population
Census	Pop.	Note	%±
1900	273		—
1910	221		−19.0%
1920	209		−5.4%
1930	173		−17.2%
1940	210		21.4%
1950	127		−39.5%
1960	102		−19.7%
1970	78		−23.5%
1980	97		24.4%
1990	87		−10.3%
2000	76		−12.6%
2010	65		−14.5%
2020	59		−9.2%
U.S. Decennial Census

As of the census of 2000, there were 76 people, 29 households, and 18 families residing in the village. The population density was 207.7 inhabitants per square mile (80.2/km^{2}). There were 31 housing units at an average density of 84.7 per square mile (32.7/km^{2}). The racial makeup of the village was 100.00% White.

There were 29 households, out of which 44.8% had children under the age of 18 living with them, 55.2% were married couples living together, 3.4% had a female householder with no husband present, and 34.5% were non-families. 27.6% of all households were made up of individuals, and 10.3% had someone living alone who was 65 years of age or older. The average household size was 2.62 and the average family size was 3.26.

In the village, the population was spread out, with 31.6% under the age of 18, 5.3% from 18 to 24, 39.5% from 25 to 44, 14.5% from 45 to 64, and 9.2% who were 65 years of age or older. The median age was 35 years. For every 100 females, there were 117.1 males. For every 100 females age 18 and over, there were 126.1 males.

The median income for a household in the village was $16,563, and the median income for a family was $25,417. Males had a median income of $21,875 versus $15,000 for females. The per capita income for the village was $8,317. There were 36.8% of families and 36.9% of the population living below the poverty line, including 33.3% of under eighteens and 50.0% of those over 64.
