= Red Corzine =

American football player (1909–2003)

- Corzine with the St. Louis Gunners in 1934

No. 42, 33, 17
- Positions: Fullback, linebacker

Personal information
- Born: January 19, 1909; Balcom, Illinois, U.S.
- Died: July 26, 2003 (aged 94); Oceanside, California, U.S.
- Listed height: 5 ft 11 in (1.80 m)
- Listed weight: 213 lb (97 kg)

Career information
- High school: Monmouth (Monmouth, Illinois)
- College: Davis & Elkins

Career history
- Cincinnati Reds (1933–1934); St. Louis Gunners (1934); New York Giants (1935–1937); Chicago Bears (1938)*
- * Offseason or practice squad member only

Career NFL statistics
- Games played: 51
- Starts: 36
- Rushing yards: 546
- Receiving yards: 171
- Total touchdowns: 4
- Stats at Pro Football Reference

Lester Howard "Red" Corzine (January 19, 1909 – July 26, 2003) was an American professional football fullback who played five seasons in the National Football League (NFL) with the Cincinnati Reds, St. Louis Gunners and New York Giants. He played college football at Davis & Elkins College.

== Early life and college ==
Lester Howard Corzine was born January 19, 1909, in Balcom, Illinois. He first enrolled at Anna High School in Anna, Illinois before transferring to Monmouth High School in Monmouth, Illinois.

Corzine was a member of the Davis & Elkins Senators of Davis & Elkins College from 1929 to 1932. He earned All-West Virginia honors each year from 1930 to 1932. He also garnered Pittsburgh Sun-Telegraph All-American recognition in 1932. Corzine was inducted into Davis & Elkins's athletics hall of fame in 1983.

== Professional career ==
Corzine played in nine games, starting seven, for the Cincinnati Reds of the National Football League (NFL) in 1933, recording 100 carries for 239 yards and one touchdown, two receptions for 38 yards, and four completions on seven passing attempts for 47 yards and one interception. He appeared in eight games, all starts, for the Reds in 1934, totaling eight rushes for 58 yards, two catches for 22 yards, and five completions on 11 attempts for 33 yards and two interceptions.

Corzine finished the 1934 season by playing in two games (one start) for the St. Louis Gunners of the NFL, rushing four times for five yards and one touchdown.

Corzine was acquired by the New York Giants of the NFL on January 3, 1935. He appeared in 11 games, starting seven, for the Giants in 1935 and totaled 32 carries for 105 yards. He played in ten games, starting three, in 1936, rushing seven times for 12 yards while also catching one pass for 36 yards and a touchdown. Corzine played in 11 games, starting a career-high ten, during the 1937 season, recording eight rushing attempts for 23 yards, nine receptions for 75 yards and one touchdown, and one incomplete pass.

Corzine signed with the NFL's Chicago Bears in 1938 but was later released.

== Personal life ==
Corzine coached three sports at his alma mater, Monmouth High School, from 1937 to 1941. He served in the United States Navy, and was an assistant coach for the Saint Mary's Pre-Flight Air Devils football team from 1942 to 1946.

Corzine died on July 26, 2003, in Oceanside, California at the age of 94.
