= Anna High School =

Anna High School may refer to:

== In the United States ==
- Anna High School (Ohio), Anna, Ohio
- Anna High School (Texas), Anna, Texas

== See also ==
- Anna-Jonesboro Community High School, Anna, Illinois, United States
