= Union County Courthouse (Illinois) =

Local government building in the United States

Coordinates: 37°27′10″N 89°16′18″W

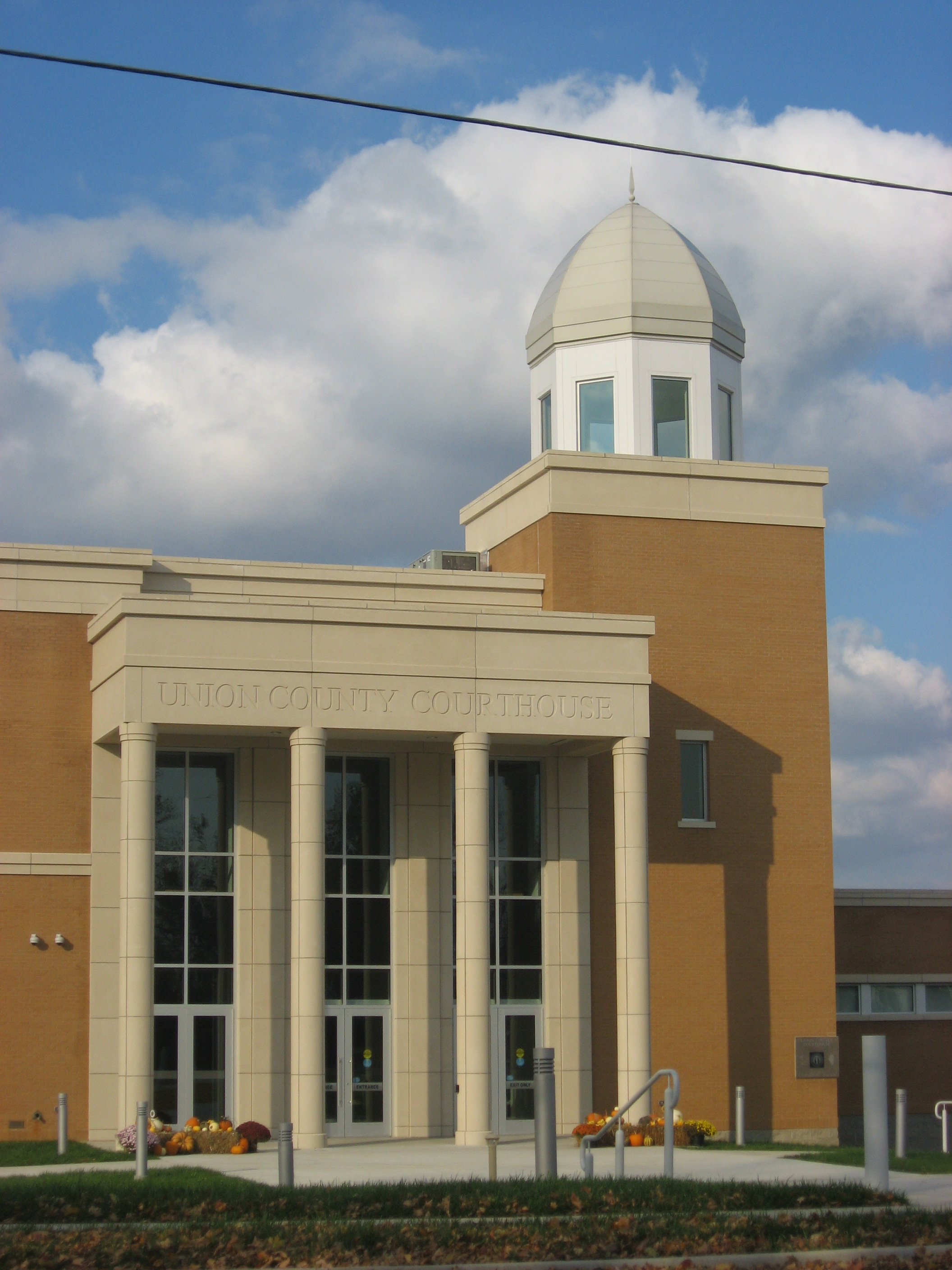
Front, pictured three months after opening

The Union County Courthouse is a government building in central Jonesboro, the county seat of Union County, Illinois, United States. Built in 2013, it replaced a brick structure whose core predated the Civil War.

== Early history ==
Europeans first reached the vicinity of Union County by means of a French expedition under Jolliet and Marquette in 1673; they are unlikely to have landed within Union County's current boundaries, but they are known to have explored the lower end of the Upper Mississippi River. The first settlement, consisting of two families who built cabins near the present site of Jonesboro in 1803, was followed by a second settlement in the American Bottom in 1805, at which time the area was yet part of Johnson County. Hills in the area attracted some settlement in 1811 by refugees from the New Madrid Earthquake seeking stable ground, but even at the end of the War of 1812, the white man was much less numerous than the red in this part of the Illinois Territory. Union County was formed by a law of January 1818, which specified the location at which the county officials should meet before selecting a county seat. Just two months later, the officials accepted the donation of land at the present site of Jonesboro, and a rude log courthouse was quickly erected by one Thomas Cox. Although the frontiersmen advocated for such a simple building, holding that justice could be dispensed equally in primitive buildings and grand, a frame courthouse was built in 1820 to replace the original.

== Jonesboro and Anna ==
Jonesboro flourished into the 1850s, but the construction of the Illinois Central Railroad posed a new challenge: the company's engineers requested a plat map of the community, but none being furnished, they bypassed the county seat by a mile, and the new community of Anna was established between Jonesboro and the railroad line. Improved transportation caused Anna to prosper, and it began to challenge Jonesboro for prominence in Union County. After an unsuccessful attempt to provide for a county-seat vote in 1868 via the state legislature, Anna partisans petitioned the county court for redress in 1870, but their petition was rejected, and the challenge gradually subsided.

== Architectural history ==
By the mid-1830s, the frame courthouse of 1820 had become insufficient, and the county government ordered its removal and the construction of a brick replacement on the same lot; the project was completed in 1838 at a cost of $5,000. Although the building was quite fine for the period, it was left altogether unmaintained, and the necessity of constructing a fourth courthouse began to appear before the eyes of the county officials. The General Assembly passed an act in early 1853 permitting Union County to borrow $5,000 for construction (not many years after a similar act had permitted the county to borrow $1,000 to repair the previous building), and the replacement building opened in 1858 at a final cost of $12,000. Two stories tall with a taller central section, the building featured a small tower atop the stepped facade. In 1963, the county expanded the building by adding a two-story stone section to each side. Despite these additions, the county outgrew the building within half a century, forcing some departments to use offices in other buildings, and more than $10 million in bonds was issued in 2012 to enable the construction of a replacement and the demolition of the old building. Its architects were the St. Louis office of HOK. The replacement opened in August 2013.
