= Anna School District =

Anna School District may refer to:

- Anna Community Consolidated School District 37 (Illinois)
- Anna Independent School District (Texas)
