= Reynoldsville =

Reynoldsville may refer to:

- Reynoldsville, Georgia, an unincorporated community in Seminole County, Georgia
- Reynoldsville, Illinois
- Reynoldsville, New York
- Reynoldsville, Pennsylvania
- Reynoldsville, West Virginia
