= Balcom, Illinois =

- Unincorporated community
- Location within Illinois Location within the United States
- Coordinates: 37°24′47″N 89°12′22″W
- Country: United States
- State: Illinois
- County: Union
- Elevation: 499 ft (152 m)
- Time zone: UTC-6 (Central (CST))
  - Summer (DST): UTC-5 (CDT)
- Area code: 618
- GNIS feature ID: 403843

Balcom is an unincorporated community in Union County, Illinois, United States. Balcom is 4 miles (6.4 km) southeast of Anna.

Red Corzine (1909–2003), football player, was born in Balcom.
