= Thompson Brothers Rock Art =

Archaeological site in Illinois, United States

- U.S. National Register of Historic Places
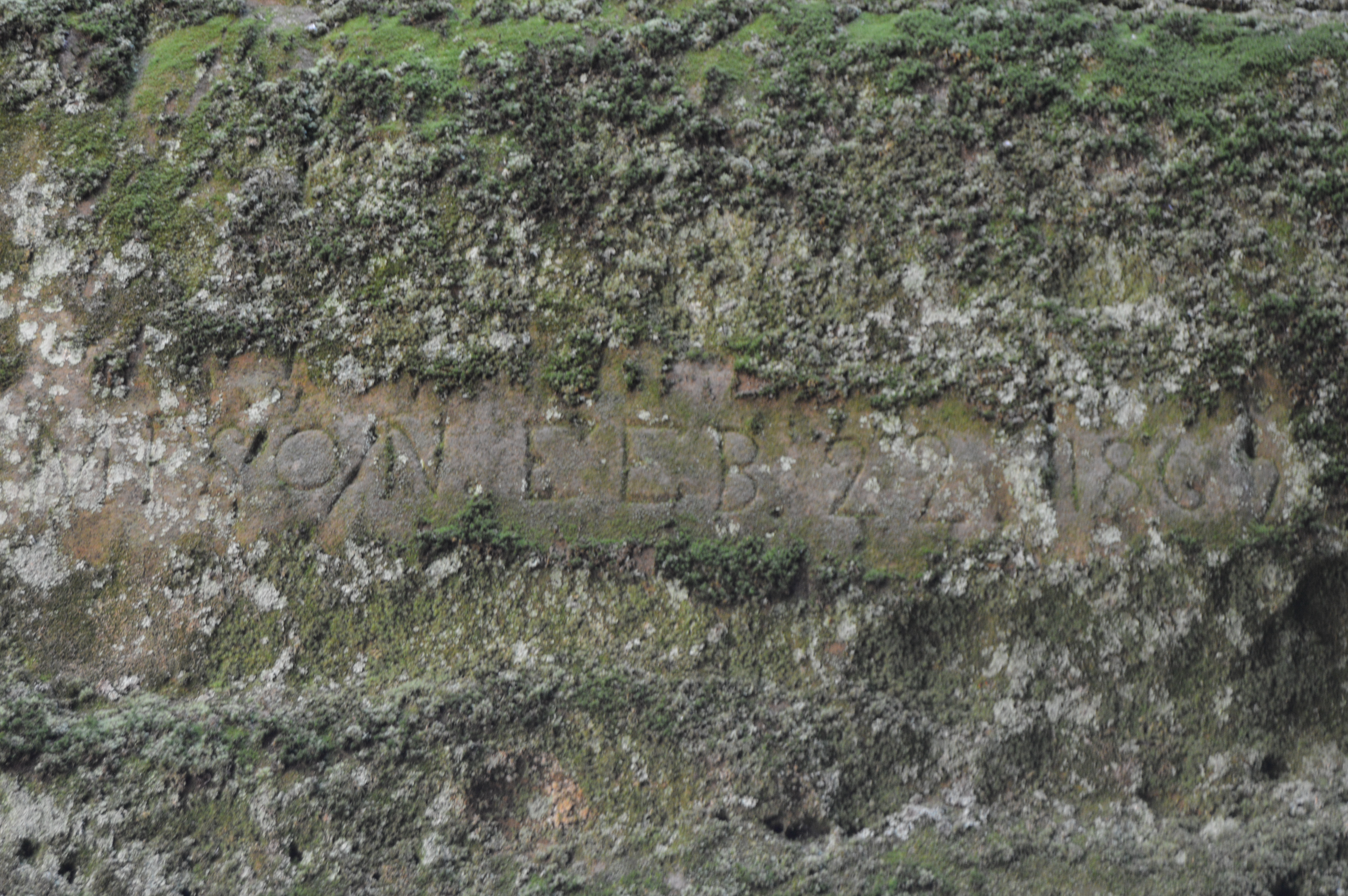
- One of the inscriptions

- Location within Illinois Location within the United States
- Location: Giant City State Park, Makanda, Illinois
- Coordinates: 37°35′42″N 89°11′36″W
- Area: Less than 1 acre (0.40 ha)
- Built: 1913-14
- NRHP reference No.: 15000933
- Added to NRHP: December 29, 2015

The Thompson Brothers Rock Art is an inscribed rock located within Giant City State Park in Union County, Illinois. Four names are carved into the rock, all but possibly one of which were inscribed by Union soldiers or supporters during the Civil War. The two most prominent signatures belong to brothers Albert S. and T. W. Thompson; the former was a Union soldier, while the latter served as Deputy Provost Marshal and was responsible for locating Union deserters. Union soldier Thomas L. Bailey also carved his name into the rock; the fourth name, A. Parker, may have been either a fellow soldier or a resident of the area who added his name after the war. The rock was carved at a time when Union supporters and Southern sympathizers fought for control of southern Illinois, and as the Thompson family were among the most prominent Union supporters, it represents an attempt to physically claim the area for the North. The Confederate sympathizers' inability to deface the names signifies their gradual loss of power in the area. The rock is now one of the few surviving Civil War sites in Illinois.

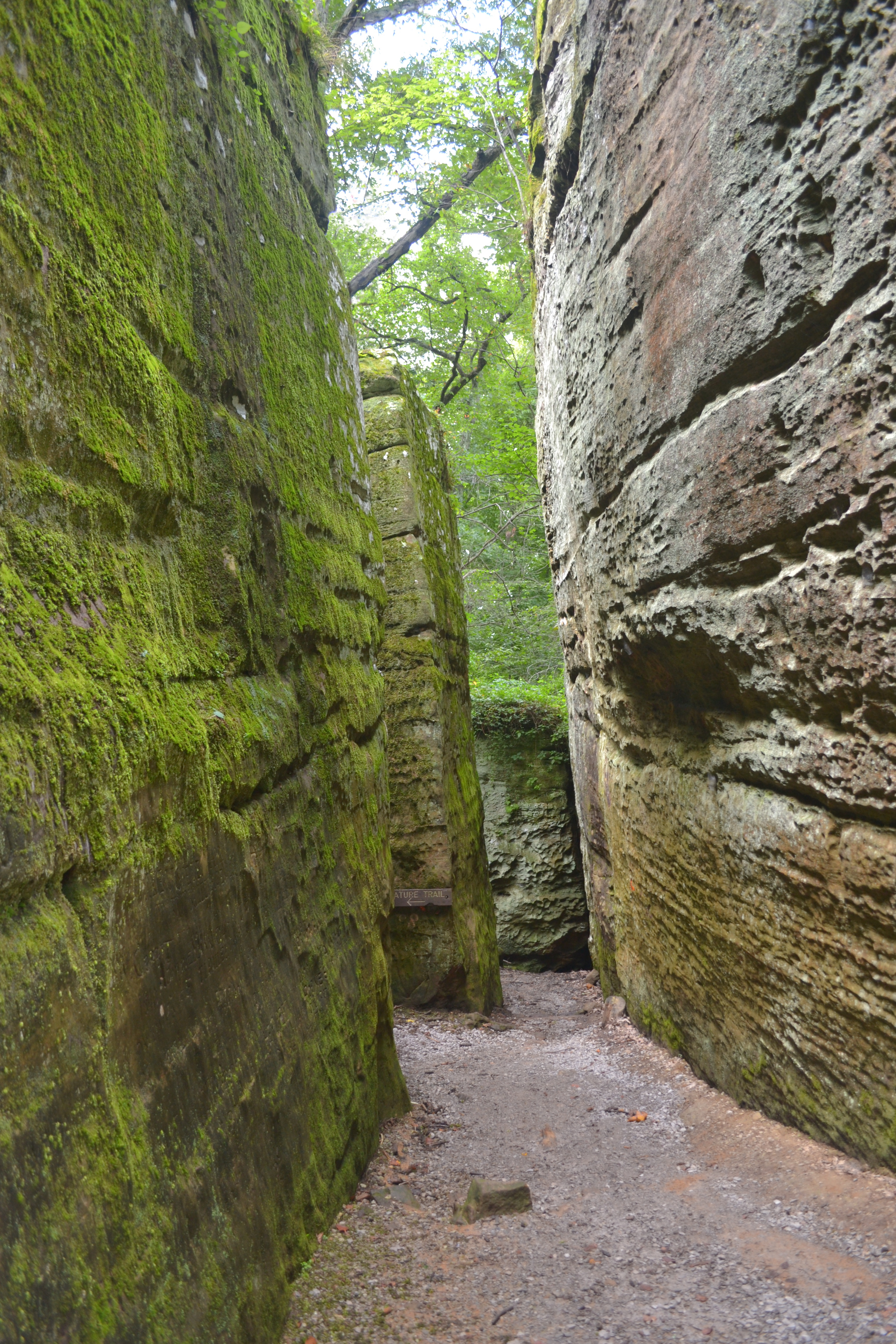
Overview of the site

The site was added to the National Register of Historic Places on December 29, 2015.

== See also ==
- Battery Rock, a Civil War site in Hardin County
