= La Rue, Illinois =

- Unincorporated community
- Location within Illinois Location within the United States
- Coordinates: 37°32′44″N 89°27′13″W
- Country: United States
- State: Illinois
- County: Union
- Elevation: 351 ft (107 m)
- Time zone: UTC-6 (Central (CST))
  - Summer (DST): UTC-5 (CDT)
- Area code: 618
- GNIS feature ID: 411652

La Rue is an unincorporated community in Union County, in the U.S. state of Illinois.

== History ==
A post office called La Rue was established in 1903, and remained in operation until 1909. The community most likely has the name of a pioneer settler.
