= King Neptune (pig) =

Hog used for US Navy fundraising in WWII (1942-1950)

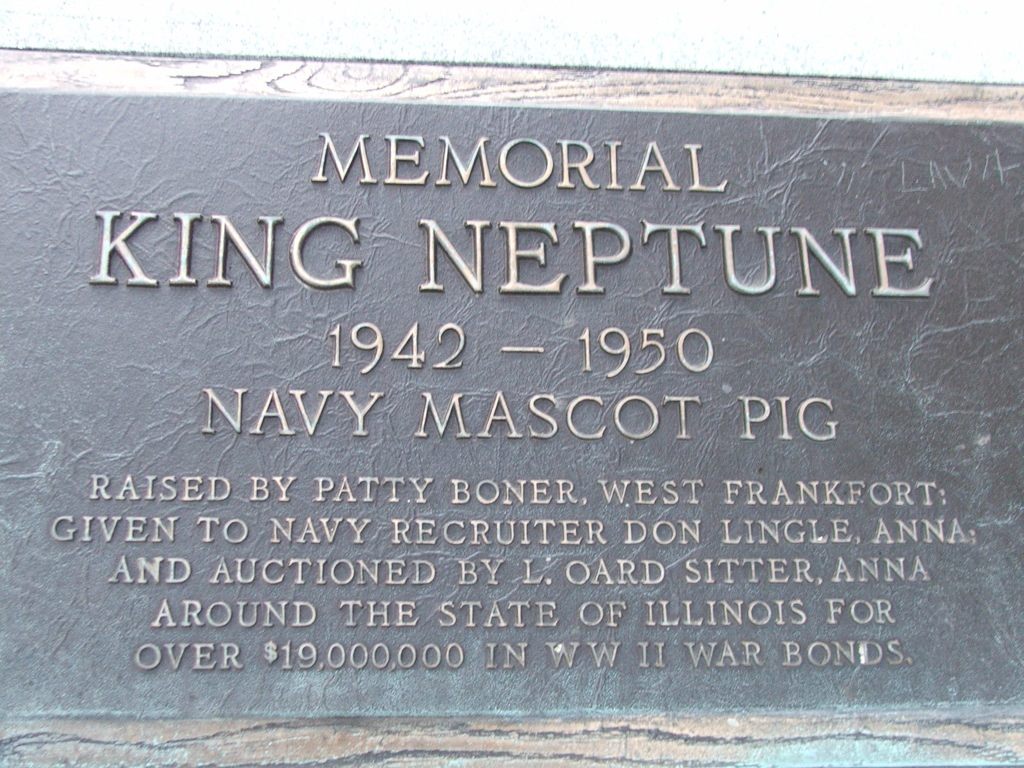
- Memorial dedicated to King Neptune at a rest stop near Anna, Illinois
- Born: May 16, 1942; West Frankfort, Illinois
- Died: 14 May 1950 (aged 7); Anna, Illinois
- Military career
- Allegiance: United States of America
- Branch: United States Navy
- Service years: 1942–1946
- Nickname: King Neptune
- Conflicts: World War II

King Neptune (May 16, 1942 – May 14, 1950) was a pig used by a United States Navy recruiter to raise $19 million (equivalent to $339,787,431 in 2025) in war bonds for the construction of the Iowa-class battleship Illinois between 1942 and 1946.

== Origins ==
King Neptune was born in a litter of 12 on the Sherman Boner farm near West Frankfort, Illinois. Originally named Parker Neptune, in honor of his father Parker Sensation, he was raised by Boner's daughter, Patty, as a 4-H project. Neptune was donated by Sherman Boner on December 5, 1942 and was originally intended to be served at a fundraising pig roast until the local Navy recruiter had another idea. Neptune was a Hereford swine, a breed characterized as mostly red, with a white face, ears and at least two white feet, similar to that of the Hereford breed of cattle.

== Fundraising efforts ==
Navy recruiter Don C. Lingle, originally of Anna, Illinois, working at the office in Marion, Illinois, decided to auction the pig to raise war bonds. Lingle and auctioneer L. Oard Sitter traveled throughout southern Illinois auctioning Neptune for bonds for the battleship Illinois which was under construction. Eventually, the individual parts of the pig were auctioned; his squeal was auctioned for $25 on at least one occasion. After each auction, King Neptune was returned to be auctioned again later. High demand for appearances by Neptune led them to travel the rest of Illinois raising funds. The pig, who was mostly red and had white features, was often displayed covered with a blue Navy blanket and wearing a crown and silver earrings.

On March 6, 1943, Illinois Governor Dwight H. Green purchased King Neptune for $1 million on behalf of the state of Illinois. At the same auction, one of Neptune's bristles was sold for $500.

On one occasion in early 1945, a check was written to King Neptune for his upkeep. The bank asked Lingle to obtain the pig's endorsement to cash the checks. Lingle was promoted to Chief Petty Officer as a result of his fund raising efforts with Neptune.

Most of the hog's appearances were sponsored by local Elks clubs and King Neptune was a life member of the chapters at Marion, Illinois, Freeport, Illinois and Harrisburg, Illinois.

Over the course of King Neptune's fundraising career, he, Lingle and Sitter helped raise $19 million (equivalent to $339,787,431 in 2025) in war bonds.

== Retirement ==
Illinois locator map for King Neptune's memorial marker

In 1946, King Neptune was to be sent to the Chicago Stockyards; however, Lingle regained ownership of the pig and placed him on a local farm where he spent the rest of his life.

King Neptune died of pneumonia on Ernest Goddard's farm near Anna, Illinois on May 14, 1950, two days prior to his 8th birthday. He was buried with military honors about six miles (10 km) east of Anna, off Illinois route 146 at a location that became locally known as King Neptune Park. In 1956, Lingle planned to donate an additional 10 acres (40,000 m^{2}) of land around the property for use as a Naval Reserve National Park. However, that plan never materialized, and in 1958 the construction of Interstate 57 forced King Neptune's grave to be temporarily relocated. In 1963, a new location was selected less than a mile east of the I-57 / IL-146 interchange (37°26′44.76″N 89°7′53.8″W). In the late 1980s, after the previous monument was heavily vandalized, the state of Illinois placed a second monument commemorating King Neptune at the nearby northbound I-57 rest area (37°27′57″N 89°7′55.7″W).

His original tombstone said:

King Neptune (1941–1950) [sic] Buried here — King Neptune, famous Navy mascot pig auctioned for $19,000,000.00 in war bonds 1942–1946 to help make a free world.

His birth year was mistakenly listed as 1941 on the first monument, but that was corrected to 1942 on the monument at the I-57 rest area.

== Similar efforts ==
In Oklahoma, a shorthorn steer and "General Grant", a Hereford bull, were also auctioned for around two million dollars each in war bonds.

== See also ==
- List of individual pigs
