= St. Paulus Evangelisch Lutherischen Gemeinde =

Historic church in Illinois, United States

- U.S. National Register of Historic Places
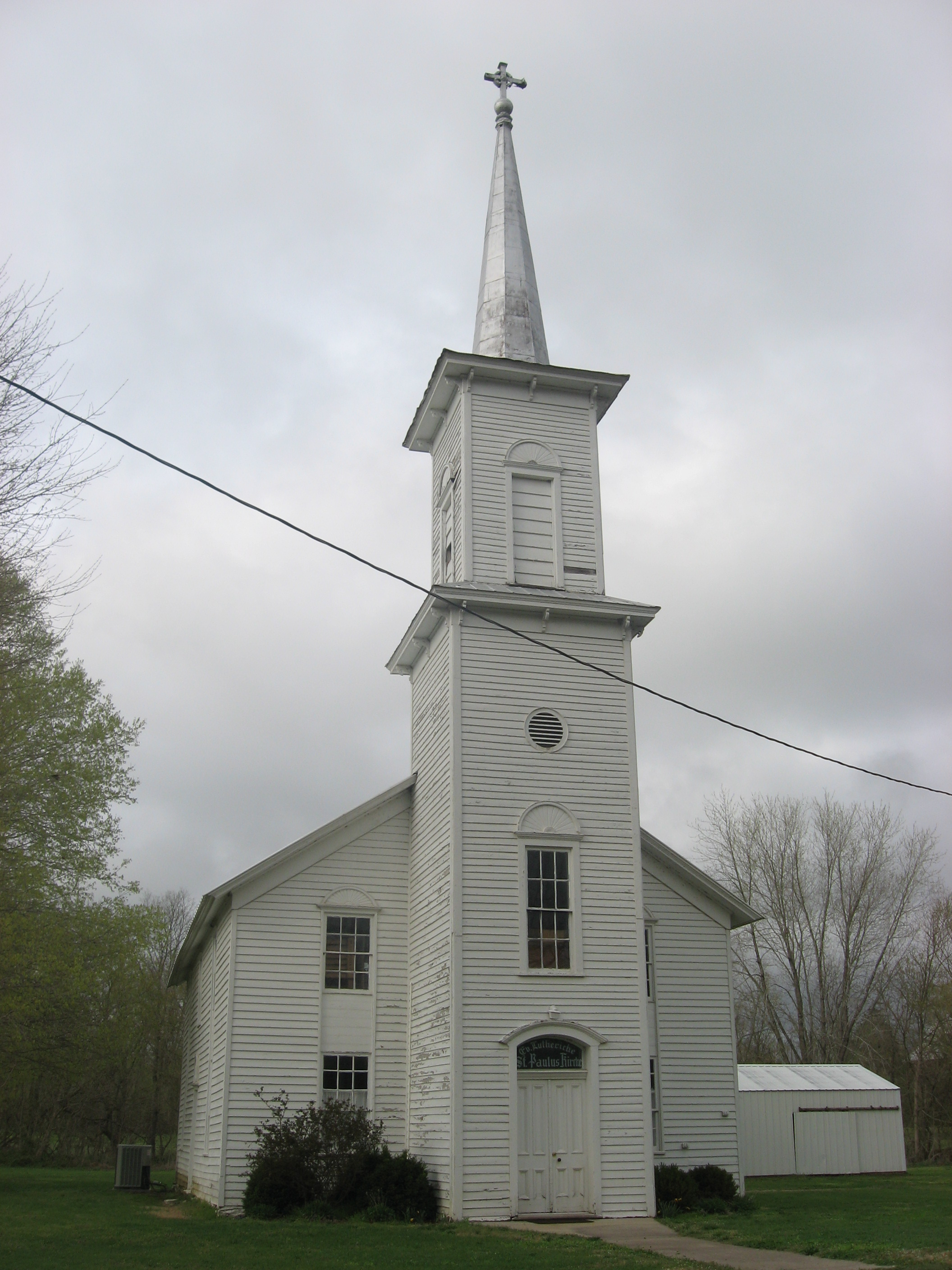
- Front

- Location within Illinois Location within the United States
- Location: South of Jonesboro off Illinois Route 127
- Nearest city: Jonesboro, Illinois
- Coordinates: 37°24′56″N 89°16′31″W
- Area: 1 acre (0.40 ha)
- Built: 1860
- Architect: Fettinger, Charles Theodore
- NRHP reference No.: 80001413
- Added to NRHP: November 24, 1980

St. Paulus Evangelisch Lutherischen Gemeinde (also called Kornthal Church or Kornthal Union County Memorial Church) is a historic Lutheran church in Jonesboro, Illinois. The church was built by immigrants from Austria, who settled in the Jonesboro area in 1852. Architect Charles Fettinger, one of the settlers, designed the church.

The wood-frame church features a limestone foundation, upper-story windows topped by lunettes, and a double entrance topped by an arched transom. The interior features an intricately carved wooden altar and pulpit, also designed by Fettinger. Construction was completed in 1860, and the building was dedicated in 1861. The church's bell tower, which is topped by a spire, was added in 1889, and the Queen Anne style parsonage was constructed in the 1900s.

Services at the church ended in 1949, and the church became the property of the Kornthal Congregation and Historical Society. It was refurbished in 1963 with the aid of the State of Illinois. The church is one of the only remnants of southern Illinois' German-speaking population.

The church was added to the National Register of Historic Places in 1980.
