= St. Anne's Episcopal Church (Anna, Illinois) =

Historic church in Illinois, United States

- U.S. National Register of Historic Places
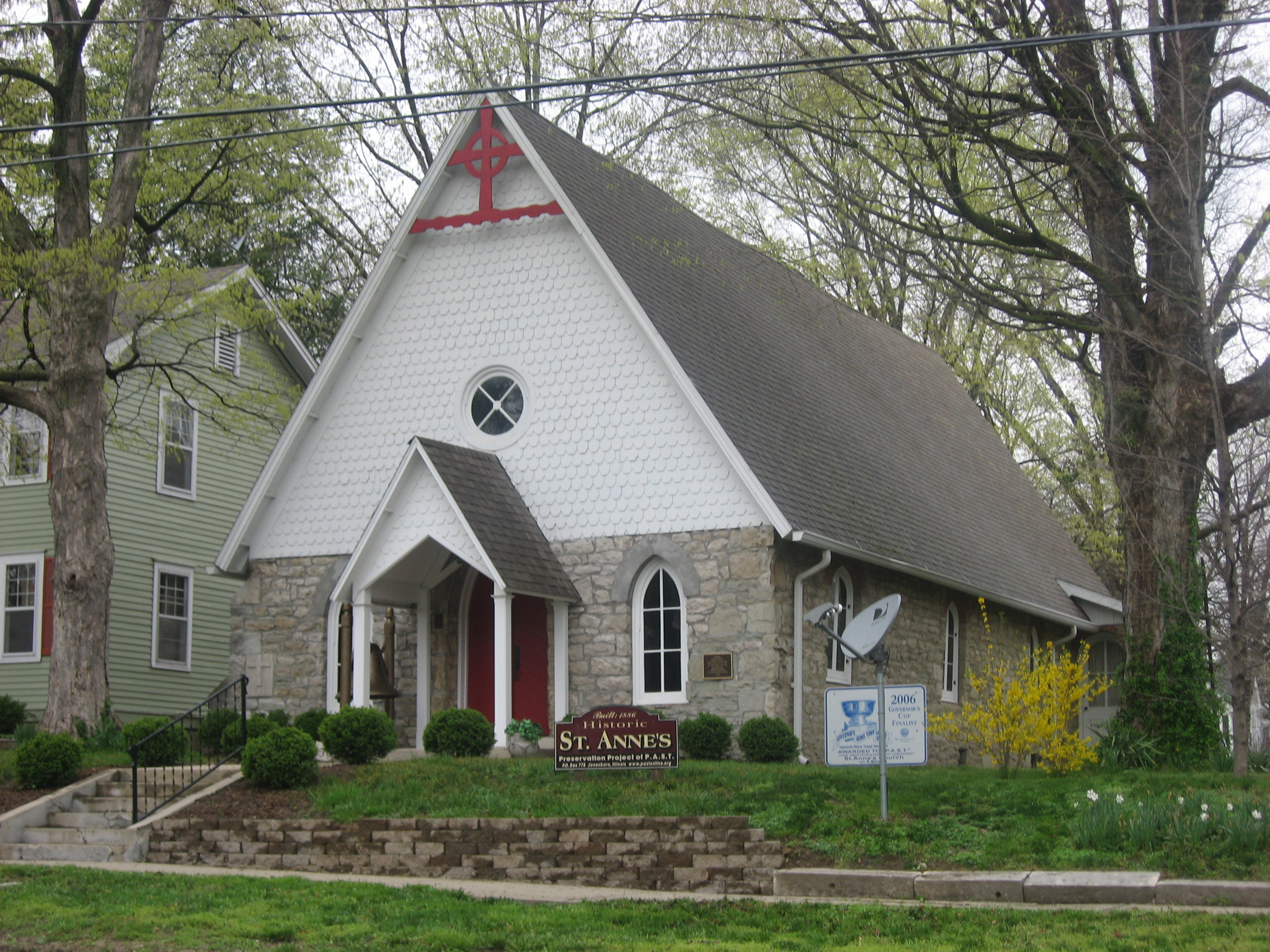
- Front and eastern side

- Location within Illinois Location within the United States
- Location: 507 S Main St., Anna, Illinois
- Coordinates: 37°27′34″N 89°15′11″W
- Built: 1886
- Built by: Dickenson, James
- Architectural style: Late Victorian Gothic
- NRHP reference No.: 02001758
- Added to NRHP: February 5, 2003

St. Anne's Episcopal Church is a historic Episcopal church located at 507 S. Main St. in Anna, Illinois. The Late Victorian Gothic church was constructed in 1886. The church was constructed with limestone quarried by the local Anna Stone Company. The church's design features a steep roof and lancet windows, both characteristic Gothic Revival elements. The wooden trim and shingles at the front of the church are inspired by the Queen Anne style. A bell tower, which was removed in 1914, originally topped the church.

The St. Anne's congregation was formed in 1883, three years before its church was constructed; prior to then, Episcopal services had been held in other denominations' churches and the town's Temperance Hall. Contractor James Dickenson constructed the church at a cost of $600 in 1886, the same year the congregation was formally recognized by the Bishop of Springfield. The church underwent renovations in the 1950s and 1960s to expand and modernize the building. In 1977, the congregation folded; the church's bell was moved to Trinity Episcopal Church in Jacksonville, Illinois five years later.

The church was listed on the U.S. National Register of Historic Places in 2003.
