= USS Illinois (BB-65) =

Uncompleted Iowa-class fast battleship

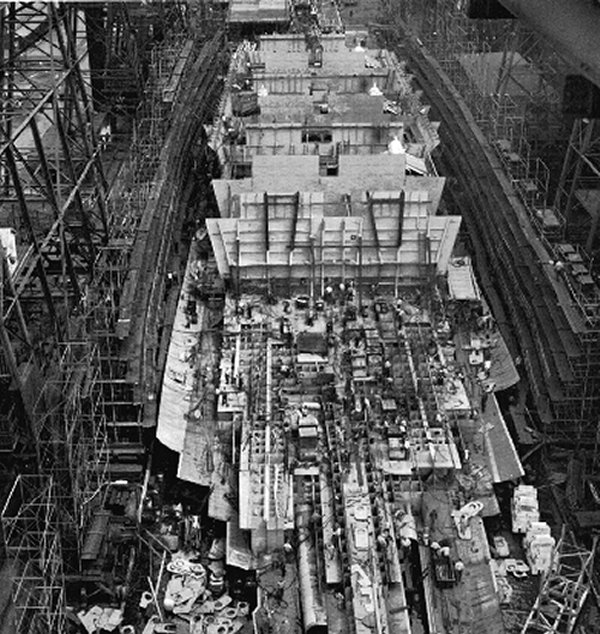
- USS Illinois (BB-65) in July 1945, just weeks before construction was canceled

History

United States
- Name: Illinois
- Namesake: State of Illinois
- Ordered: 9 September 1940
- Builder: Philadelphia Naval Shipyard
- Laid down: 6 December 1942
- Stricken: 12 August 1945
- Fate: Dismantled on slipway, September 1958

General characteristics
- Class & type: Iowa-class battleship
- Displacement: Standard: 48,110 long tons (48,880 t); Full load: 57,540 long tons (58,460 t)
- Length: 887 feet 3 inches (270.4 m) loa
- Beam: 108 ft 2 in (33 m)
- Draft: 36 ft 2.25 in (11 m)
- Installed power: 8 × Babcock & Wilcox boilers; 212,000 shaft horsepower (158,000 kW)
- Propulsion: 4 × steam turbines; 4 × screw propellers
- Speed: 32.5 kn (37.4 mph; 60.2 km/h)
- Range: 15,000 mi (24,000 km) at 15 knots (28 km/h; 17 mph)
- Complement: 117 officers; 1,804 enlisted men
- Armament: 9 × 16 in (406 mm)/50 cal Mark 7 guns; 20 × 5 in (127 mm)/38 cal Mark 12 guns; 80 × 40 mm (1.6 in) anti-aircraft guns; 49 × 20 mm (0.79 in) anti-aircraft guns
- Armor: Belt: 12.1 in (307 mm); Bulkheads: 14.5 in (368 mm); Barbettes: 17.3–11.6 in (439–295 mm); Turrets: 19.5 in (495 mm); Decks: 6 in (152 mm)

USS (Note: The ship was never commissioned by the U.S. Navy and therefore never actually received the "USS" prefix, but is still conventionally referred to as USS Illinois.) Illinois (hull number BB-65) was an uncompleted Iowa-class fast battleship, the fifth of her type laid down for the United States Navy during World War II. The Navy had initially planned on building four of the Iowas and then developing a new, more powerful ship for what was to be BB-65. The pressing need for more warships at the outbreak of World War II in Europe led the Navy to conclude that new designs would have to be placed on hold to allow the shipbuilding industry to standardize on a small number of designs. As a result, BB-65 was ordered to the Iowa design in 1940. Illinois was laid down in December 1942, but work was given a low priority, and was still under construction at the end of World War II. In August 1945 construction was canceled, the hull then remained as a parts hulk until it was broken up in 1958.

== Background ==
The Iowa class of fast battleships was designed in the late 1930s in response to the US Navy's expectations for a future war with the Empire of Japan. American officers preferred comparatively slow but heavily armed and armored battleships, but Navy planners determined that such a fleet would have difficulty in bringing the faster Japanese fleet to battle, particularly the Kongō-class battlecruisers and the aircraft carriers of the 1st Air Fleet. Design studies prepared during the development of the earlier North Carolina and South Dakota classes demonstrated the difficulty in resolving the desires of fleet officers with those of the planning staff in the displacement limits imposed by the Washington Naval Treaty system, which had governed capital ship construction since 1923. An escalator clause in the Second London Naval Treaty of 1936 that allowed an increase from 35,000 long tons (36,000 t) to 45,000 long tons (46,000 t) in the event that any member nation refused to sign the treaty, which Japan refused to do.

The passage of the Second Vinson Act in 1938 cleared the way for construction of the four South Dakota–class battleships and the first two Iowa-class battleships (Iowa and New Jersey) for the United States Navy. Two more vessels, Missouri and Wisconsin, were ordered in June 1940, and were to have been the final members of the Iowa class. The Navy initially planned to develop a new, more powerful design for the next battleship, designated "BB-65", which would eventually become the Montana class. But the need to adopt industrial mobilization as the threat of war loomed forced the Navy to place new designs on hold, and as a result, BB-65 and a second ship were ordered to the Iowa design. The last battleships to be built by the United States, the Iowa-class ships were also the US Navy's largest and fastest vessels of the type.

== Design ==
Illinois was 887 feet 3 inches (270.4 m) long overall and had a beam of 108 ft 2 in (33 m) and a draft of 36 ft 2.25 in (11 m). Her standard displacement as completed would have amounted to 48,110 long tons (48,880 t) and increased to 57,540 long tons (58,460 t) at full combat load. Illinois differed from her earlier sisters in that her design called for an all-welded construction, which would have saved weight due to increased strength over a combination riveted/welded hull used on the four completed Iowa-class ships.

The ship was to have been powered by four General Electric steam turbines, each driving one screw propeller, using steam provided by eight oil-fired Babcock & Wilcox boilers. Rated at 212,000 shaft horsepower (158,000 kW), the turbines were intended to give a top speed of 32.5 knots (60.2 km/h; 37.4 mph). The ship had a planned cruising range of 15,000 nautical miles (28,000 km; 17,000 mi) at a speed of 15 knots (28 km/h; 17 mph). Her projected crew numbered 117 officers and 1,804 enlisted men.

The ship was to have been armed with a main battery of nine 16 in (406 mm) /50 caliber Mark 7 guns (Note: /50 refers to the length of the gun in terms of calibers. A /50 gun is 50 times long as its bore diameter.) guns in three triple-gun turrets on the centerline, two of which were placed in a superfiring pair forward, with the third aft. The planned secondary battery consisted of twenty 5 in (127 mm) /38 caliber dual purpose guns mounted in twin turrets clustered amidships, five turrets on either side. As designed, the ship was to be equipped with an anti-aircraft battery of eighty 40 mm (1.6 in) guns and forty-nine 20 mm (0.79 in) auto-cannon.

The main armor belt was 12.1 in (307 mm) thick, while the main armor deck was 6 in (152 mm) thick. The main battery gun turrets had 19.5 in (495 mm) thick faces, and they were mounted atop barbettes that were protected with 17.3–11.6 in (439–295 mm) of armored steel. The conning tower had 17.3 in (439 mm) thick sides. Like the Iowa-class ships from Missouri onward, the traverse bulkhead armor was increased from the original 11.3 in (287 mm) to 14.5 in (368 mm) in order to better protect against fire from frontal sectors. Tests with caissons in 1943 led to improvements for the torpedo defense system that increased its resilience to underwater damage by around twenty percent compared to the first four Iowas.

== Construction and cancellation ==
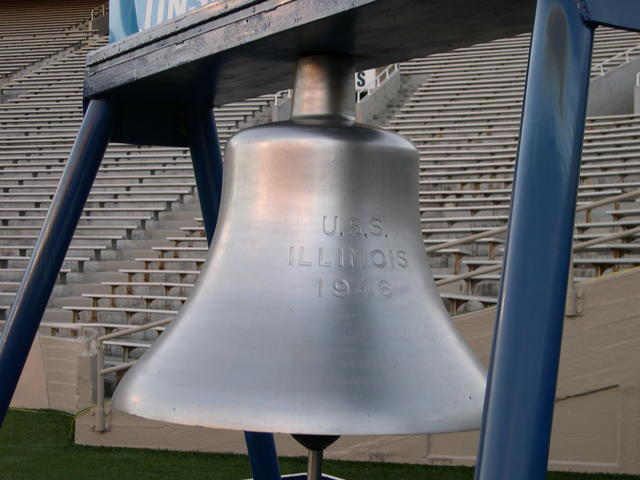
The ship's bell from Illinois at Memorial Stadium, University of Illinois at Urbana–Champaign

When BB-65 was redesignated an Iowa-class ship, she was assigned the name Illinois and reconfigured to adhere to the fast battleship designs drawn up in 1938, by the Preliminary Design Branch at the Bureau of Construction and Repair. Her funding was authorized via the passage of the Two-Ocean Navy Act by the U.S. Congress on 19 July 1940, and she would now become the fifth Iowa-class ship built for the U.S. Navy. Her contract was assigned on 9 September 1940, the same date as Kentucky. Funding for the battleship was provided in part by proceeds from the auction of "King Neptune", a Hereford swine presented across the state of Illinois as a fundraiser, ultimately helping to raise $19 million in war bonds.

Illinois's construction was put on hold in 1942, after the Battles of the Coral Sea and Midway, while the Bureau of Ships considered an aircraft carrier conversion proposal for Illinois and Kentucky. As proposed, the converted Illinois flight deck would have been 864 feet (263 m) long by 108 feet (33 m) wide, with an armament identical to the carriers of the Essex-class's four twin 5-inch gun mounts and four more 5-inch guns in single mounts, along with six 40 mm quadruple mounts. The conversion was abandoned after the design team decided that the converted carriers would carry fewer aircraft than the Essex-class, that more Essex-class carriers could be built in the same amount of time to convert the battleships, and that the project would be significantly more expensive than building new Essex-class carriers. Instead, Illinois and Kentucky were to be completed as battleships, but their construction was given very low priority.

Illinois's keel was laid down at the Philadelphia Naval Shipyard, on 6 December 1942; her projected completion date was 1 May 1945. Ultimately, the ship was canceled on 11 August 1945, when she was about 22 per cent complete. She was struck from the Naval Vessel Register on 12 August 1945. Her incomplete hulk initially was retained on the belief that it could be used as a target in nuclear weapons tests. However, the $30 million it would cost to complete the ship enough to be able to launch her proved too great and the plan was abandoned. She remained in the dockyard until September 1958, when she was broken up on the slipway.

The ship's bell, inscribed "USS Illinois 1946", is now at Memorial Stadium at the University of Illinois at Urbana–Champaign. The bell is on loan from the Naval History and Heritage Command (Accession #70-399-A), Washington Navy Yard, Washington DC, to the Naval Reserve Officers Training Corps (NROTC) at the university. The bell is traditionally rung by NROTC members when the university football team scores a touchdown or goal.
