= Battery Rock =

- U.S. National Register of Historic Places
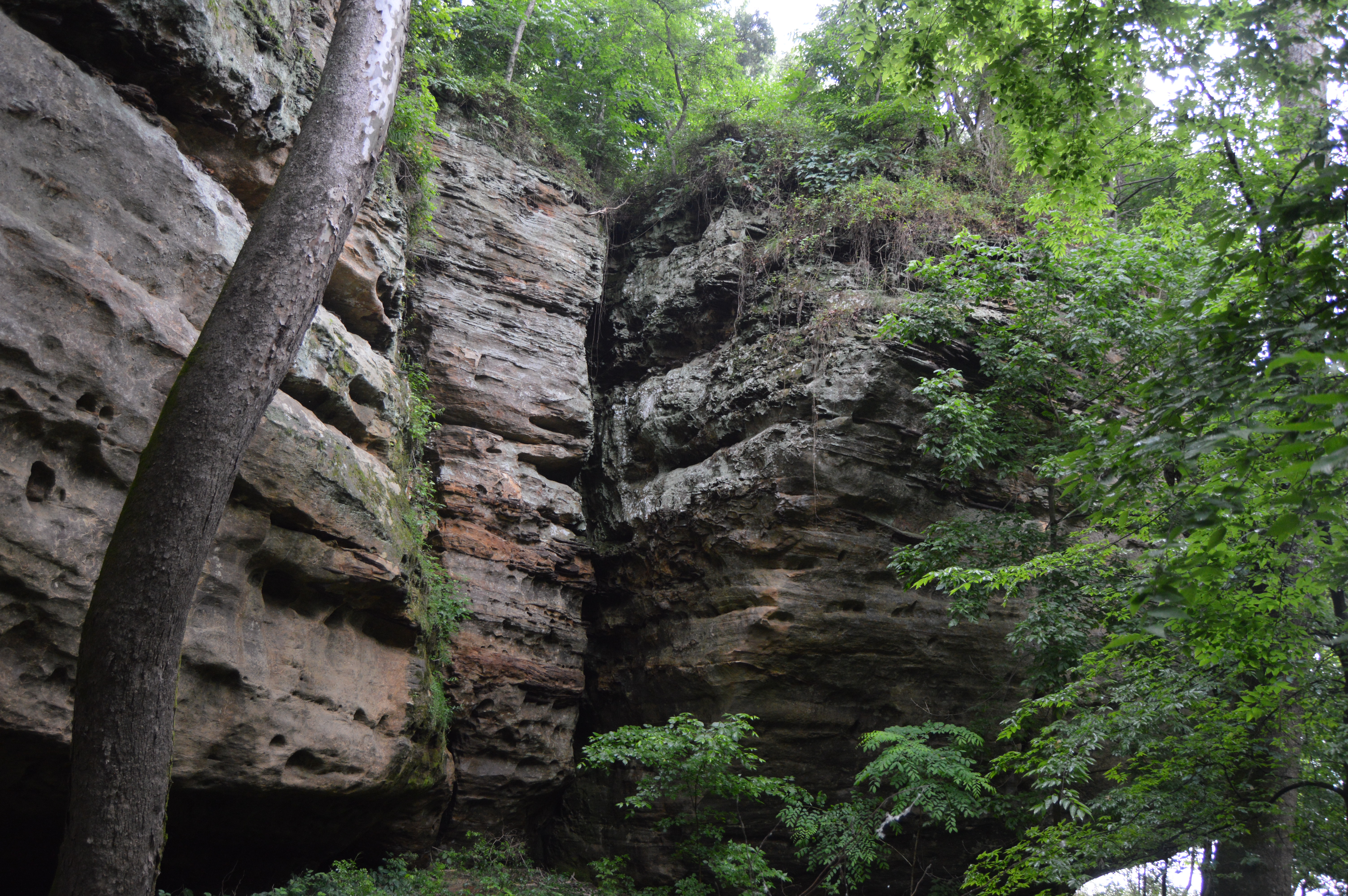
- Battery Rock from its base

- Location within Illinois Location within the United States
- Location: West Bank, River Mile 860, Ohio River
- Nearest city: Cave-in-Rock, Illinois
- Coordinates: 37°31′48″N 88°4′49″W
- Area: 33.5 acres (13.6 ha)
- MPS: Caught in the Middle: The Civil War on the Lower Ohio River MPS
- NRHP reference No.: 98001257
- Added to NRHP: November 5, 1998

Battery Rock is a limestone bluff located at Mile 860 of the Ohio River in Hardin County, Illinois, across from Caseyville, Kentucky. The bluff is a prominent navigational landmark along the river.

The site played a role in several conflicts during the Civil War. In 1862, the Union Army based its troops at Battery Rock during a standoff with Confederate troops at Caseyville; the standoff ended when the Union troops moved to Caseyville, found that the Confederates had left the town, and punished the rebellious residents. The bluff also played a role in Confederate general Stovepipe Johnson's attack on riverboats in 1864. During the attack, boats used the landing at Battery Rock as a safe harbor and a place to monitor the situation. In addition, two Union recruiters from Kentucky used the bluff as a recruiting station in 1864, and either a Union garrison or a local defense force placed two cannons at the site; graffiti left by an Indiana regiment has also been found at the site.

The bluff was used as a filming location for the film How the West Was Won in the 1960s.

Battery Rock was added to the National Register of Historic Places on November 5, 1998.

== See also ==
- Thompson Brothers Rock Art, a Civil War site in Union County
