= Union County, Illinois =

County in Illinois, United States

- County
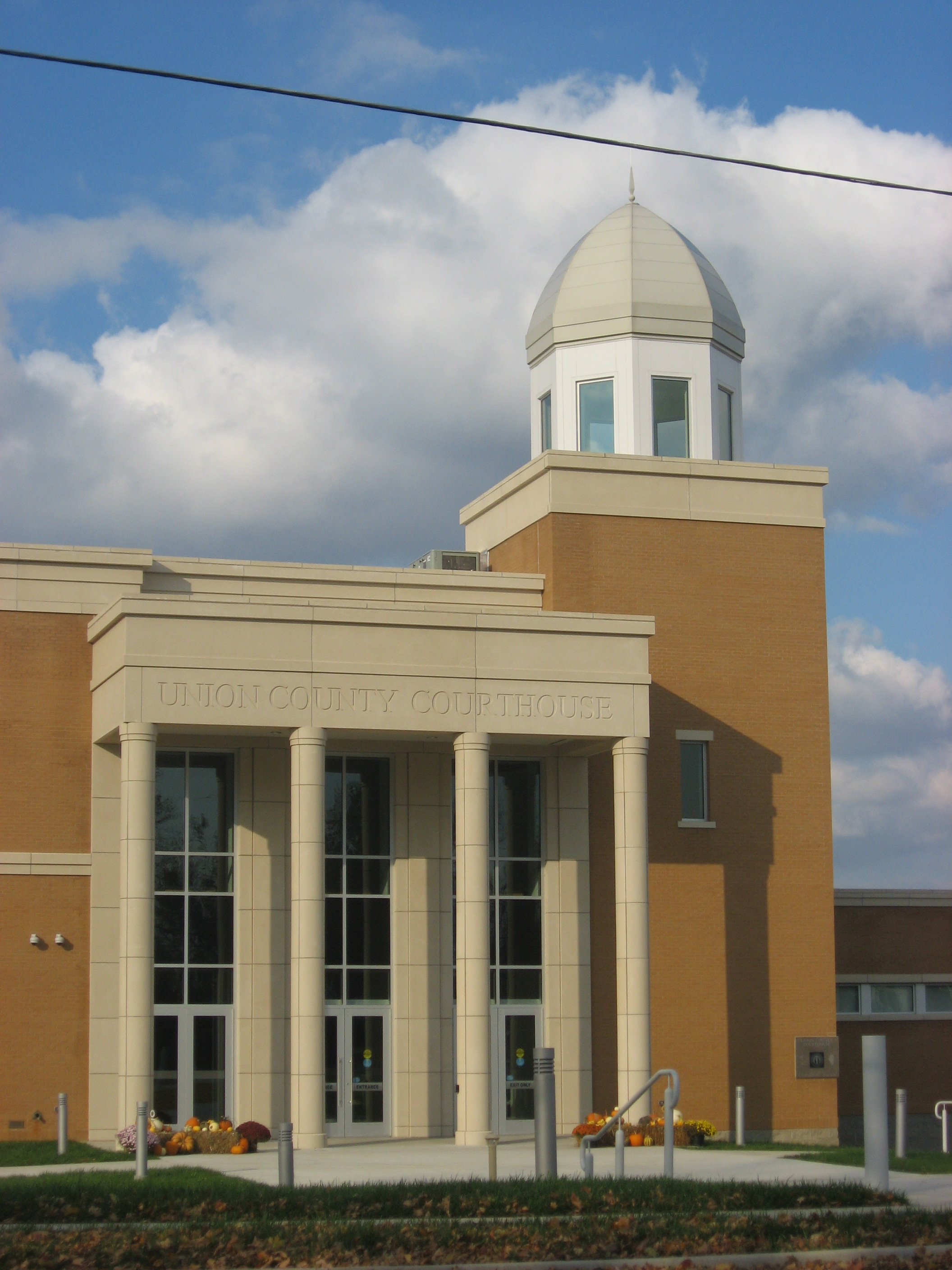
- Union County Courthouse in Jonesboro

- Location within the U.S. state of Illinois
- Coordinates: 37°28′N 89°16′W
- Country: United States
- State: Illinois
- Founded: January 2, 1818
- Seat: Jonesboro
- Largest city: Anna

Area
  - Total: 422 sq mi (1,090 km^{2})
  - Land: 413 sq mi (1,070 km^{2})
  - Water: 8.7 sq mi (23 km^{2}) 2.1%

Population (2020)
  - Total: 17,244
  - Estimate (2025): 16,656 ▼
  - Density: 41.8/sq mi (16.1/km^{2})
- Time zone: UTC−6 (Central)
  - Summer (DST): UTC−5 (CDT)
- Congressional district: 12th
- Website: www.unioncountyil.gov

Union County is a county located in the U.S. state of Illinois. According to the 2020 United States census, it had a population of 17,244. Its county seat is Jonesboro. It is located in the southern portion of Illinois known locally as "Little Egypt".

== History ==
Union County was formed out of Johnson County, nearly a year before the Illinois Territory gained statehood. It was named for a joint revival meeting of the Baptists and Dunkards, called a "union meeting". The county seal depicts the leaders of these two groups shaking hands.

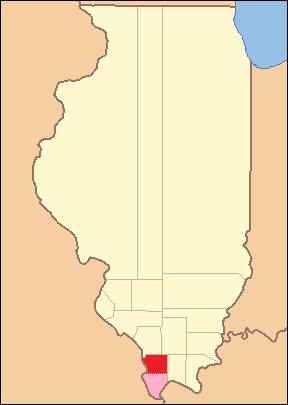
For its first year of existence, Union County included an area of unorganized territory temporarily attached to it.

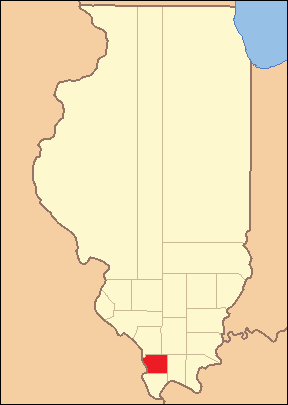
In 1819, the additional territory became Alexander County, reducing Union to its current borders.

== Geography ==
According to the US Census Bureau, the county has a total area of 422 square miles (1,090 km^{2}), of which 413 square miles (1,070 km^{2}) is land and 8.7 square miles (23 km^{2}) (2.1%) is water.

=== Climate and weather ===
Jonesboro, Illinois

Climate chart (precipitation, max. and min. temperature)
J	F	M	A	M	J	J	A	S	O	N	D
3.6 42 22	3.4 49 27	4.7 60 35	4.7 70 44	5.2 78 53	4.2 86 62	3.3 90 66	3.6 89 64	3.1 82 56	3.4 72 45	4.8 58 36	4.3 46 27
- █ Average max. and min. temperatures in °F
- █ Precipitation totals in inches
- Source: The Weather Channel
Metric conversion
J	F	M	A	M	J	J	A	S	O	N	D
91 6 −6	87 9 −3	120 16 2	119 21 7	133 26 12	107 30 17	83 32 19	91 32 18	80 28 13	86 22 7	121 14 2	109 8 −3
- █ Average max. and min. temperatures in °C
- █ Precipitation totals in mm

In recent years, average temperatures in the county seat of Jonesboro have ranged from a low of 22 °F (−6 °C) in January to a high of 90 °F (32 °C) in July, although a record low of −20 °F (−29 °C) was recorded in January 1918 and a record high of 112 °F (44 °C) was recorded in July 1901. Average monthly precipitation ranged from 3.13 inches (80 mm) in September to 5.22 inches (133 mm) in May.

=== Major highways ===
- Interstate 57
- U.S. Highway 51
- Illinois Route 3
- Illinois Route 127
- Illinois Route 146

=== Adjacent counties ===
- Jackson County – north
- Williamson County – northeast
- Johnson County – east
- Pulaski County – southeast
- Alexander County – south
- Cape Girardeau County, Missouri – west
- Perry County, Missouri – northwest

=== Protected areas ===
- Brown Barrens Nature Preserve
- Crab Orchard National Wildlife Refuge (partial)
- Cypress Creek National Wildlife Refuge (partial)
- Lincoln Memorial Picnic Grounds
- Giant City State Park (partial)
- McClure Shale Glade Nature Preserve
- Trail of Tears State Forest
- Shawnee National Forest (partial)
- Union County State Fish and Wildlife Area

== Demographics ==
Historical population
Census	Pop.	Note	%±
1820	2,362		—
1830	3,239		37.1%
1840	5,524		70.5%
1850	7,615		37.9%
1860	11,181		46.8%
1870	16,518		47.7%
1880	18,102		9.6%
1890	21,549		19.0%
1900	22,610		4.9%
1910	21,856		−3.3%
1920	20,249		−7.4%
1930	19,883		−1.8%
1940	21,528		8.3%
1950	20,500		−4.8%
1960	17,645		−13.9%
1970	16,071		−8.9%
1980	17,765		10.5%
1990	17,619		−0.8%
2000	18,293		3.8%
2010	17,808		−2.7%
2020	17,244		−3.2%
2025 (est.)	16,656	▼	−3.4%
US Decennial Census; 1790-1960 1900-1990; 1990-2000 2010-2013 2020

=== 2020 census ===
As of the 2020 census, the county had a population of 17,244. The median age was 44.9 years. 20.4% of residents were under the age of 18 and 22.3% of residents were 65 years of age or older. For every 100 females there were 101.0 males, and for every 100 females age 18 and over there were 100.7 males age 18 and over.

The racial makeup of the county was 90.0% White, 1.3% Black or African American, 0.5% American Indian and Alaska Native, 0.4% Asian, 0.1% Native Hawaiian and Pacific Islander, 1.7% from some other race, and 6.1% from two or more races. Hispanic or Latino residents of any race comprised 5.0% of the population.

35.2% of residents lived in urban areas, while 64.8% lived in rural areas.

There were 6,983 households in the county, of which 27.4% had children under the age of 18 living in them. Of all households, 47.7% were married-couple households, 18.0% were households with a male householder and no spouse or partner present, and 27.5% were households with a female householder and no spouse or partner present. About 30.8% of all households were made up of individuals and 15.6% had someone living alone who was 65 years of age or older.

There were 7,841 housing units, of which 10.9% were vacant. Among occupied housing units, 74.7% were owner-occupied and 25.3% were renter-occupied. The homeowner vacancy rate was 2.2% and the rental vacancy rate was 11.3%.

=== Racial and ethnic composition ===
Union County, Illinois – Racial and ethnic composition Note: the US Census treats Hispanic/Latino as an ethnic category. This table excludes Latinos from the racial categories and assigns them to a separate category. Hispanics/Latinos may be of any race.
Race / Ethnicity (NH = Non-Hispanic)	Pop 1980	Pop 1990	Pop 2000	Pop 2010	Pop 2020	% 1980	% 1990	% 2000	% 2010	% 2020
White alone (NH)	17,563	17,243	17,407	16,454	15,331	98.86%	97.87%	95.16%	92.40%	88.91%
Black or African American alone (NH)	68	122	149	151	226	0.38%	0.69%	0.81%	0.85%	1.31%
Native American or Alaska Native alone (NH)	19	22	62	59	46	0.11%	0.12%	0.34%	0.33%	0.27%
Asian alone (NH)	16	50	48	52	67	0.09%	0.28%	0.26%	0.29%	0.39%
Native Hawaiian or Pacific Islander alone (NH)	x	x	2	5	11	x	x	0.01%	0.03%	0.06%
Other race alone (NH)	8	0	6	8	28	0.05%	0.00%	0.03%	0.04%	0.16%
Mixed race or Multiracial (NH)	x	x	138	216	668	x	x	0.75%	1.21%	3.87%
Hispanic or Latino (any race)	91	182	481	863	867	0.51%	1.03%	2.63%	4.85%	5.03%
Total	17,765	17,619	18,293	17,808	17,244	100.00%	100.00%	100.00%	100.00%	100.00%

=== 2010 census ===
As of the 2010 United States census, there were 17,808 people, 7,167 households, and 4,837 families residing in the county. The population density was 43.1 inhabitants per square mile (16.6/km^{2}). There were 7,924 housing units at an average density of 19.2 per square mile (7.4/km^{2}). The racial makeup of the county was 94.8% white, 0.9% black or African American, 0.5% American Indian, 0.3% Asian, 2.0% from other races, and 1.5% from two or more races. Those of Hispanic or Latino origin made up 4.8% of the population. In terms of ancestry, 23.0% were German, 12.6% were Irish, 9.4% were English, and 8.1% were American.

Of the 7,167 households, 29.7% had children under the age of 18 living with them, 52.6% were married couples living together, 10.6% had a female householder with no husband present, 32.5% were non-families, and 28.4% of all households were made up of individuals. The average household size was 2.41 and the average family size was 2.92. The median age was 42.9 years.

The median income for a household in the county was $39,760 and the median income for a family was $48,465. Males had a median income of $36,831 versus $31,272 for females. The per capita income for the county was $19,512. About 12.7% of families and 21.1% of the population were below the poverty line, including 22.5% of those under age 18 and 16.7% of those age 65 or over.

== Communities ==
=== Cities ===
- Anna
- Jonesboro (seat)

=== Villages ===
- Alto Pass
- Cobden
- Dongola
- Mill Creek

=== Unincorporated communities ===
- Balcom
- La Rue
- Reynoldsville
- Ware
- Wolf Lake

== Politics ==
Like much of Southern Illinois, Union County has shifted toward the Republican Party over the past couple decades, with the Republican candidate for president winning the county since 2000.

United States presidential election results for Union County, Illinois
Year	Republican		Democratic		Third party(ies)	
Year	No.	%	No.	%	No.	%
1892	1,427	33.96%	2,663	63.37%	112	2.67%
1896	1,842	37.65%	2,998	61.28%	52	1.06%
1900	1,695	36.49%	2,900	62.43%	50	1.08%
1904	1,537	39.54%	1,967	50.60%	383	9.85%
1908	1,695	37.43%	2,690	59.40%	144	3.18%
1912	458	10.44%	2,648	60.36%	1,281	29.20%
1916	3,135	37.11%	5,171	61.22%	141	1.67%
1920	3,119	45.55%	3,660	53.45%	68	0.99%
1924	2,579	39.16%	3,783	57.44%	224	3.40%
1928	3,352	44.52%	4,149	55.10%	29	0.39%
1932	2,859	31.47%	6,157	67.77%	69	0.76%
1936	4,165	39.81%	6,260	59.84%	36	0.34%
1940	4,915	45.51%	5,804	53.74%	81	0.75%
1944	4,114	48.25%	4,367	51.21%	46	0.54%
1948	3,864	46.01%	4,479	53.33%	55	0.65%
1952	4,658	51.97%	4,296	47.93%	9	0.10%
1956	4,204	49.06%	4,359	50.87%	6	0.07%
1960	4,432	50.58%	4,321	49.31%	10	0.11%
1964	3,142	37.63%	5,208	62.37%	0	0.00%
1968	3,889	46.45%	3,603	43.04%	880	10.51%
1972	5,034	59.36%	3,428	40.42%	18	0.21%
1976	3,531	41.16%	5,003	58.32%	44	0.51%
1980	4,289	50.81%	3,781	44.79%	371	4.40%
1984	4,721	55.13%	3,815	44.55%	28	0.33%
1988	4,244	50.05%	4,197	49.50%	38	0.45%
1992	3,003	33.06%	4,681	51.54%	1,399	15.40%
1996	3,147	38.00%	4,252	51.34%	883	10.66%
2000	4,397	50.77%	3,982	45.98%	281	3.24%
2004	5,333	58.48%	3,735	40.96%	51	0.56%
2008	5,003	54.65%	3,918	42.80%	233	2.55%
2012	4,957	59.59%	3,137	37.71%	224	2.69%
2016	5,790	67.20%	2,402	27.88%	424	4.92%
2020	6,161	69.19%	2,579	28.96%	164	1.84%
2024	5,837	70.60%	2,285	27.64%	146	1.77%

== Education ==
School districts include:

K-12:

- Cobden School Unit District 17
- Dongola School Unit District 66
- Goreville Community Unit School District 1
- Shawnee Community Unit School District 84

Secondary:

- Anna Jonesboro Community High School District 81
- Vienna High School District 133

Elementary:

- Anna Community Consolidated School District 37
- Buncombe Consolidated School District 43
- Cypress School District 64
- Jonesboro Community Consolidated School District 43
- Lick Creek Community Consolidated School District 16

== See also ==
- National Register of Historic Places listings in Union County, Illinois
- Ku Klux Klan in Southern Illinois
