= Campground Church and Cemetery Site =

- U.S. National Register of Historic Places
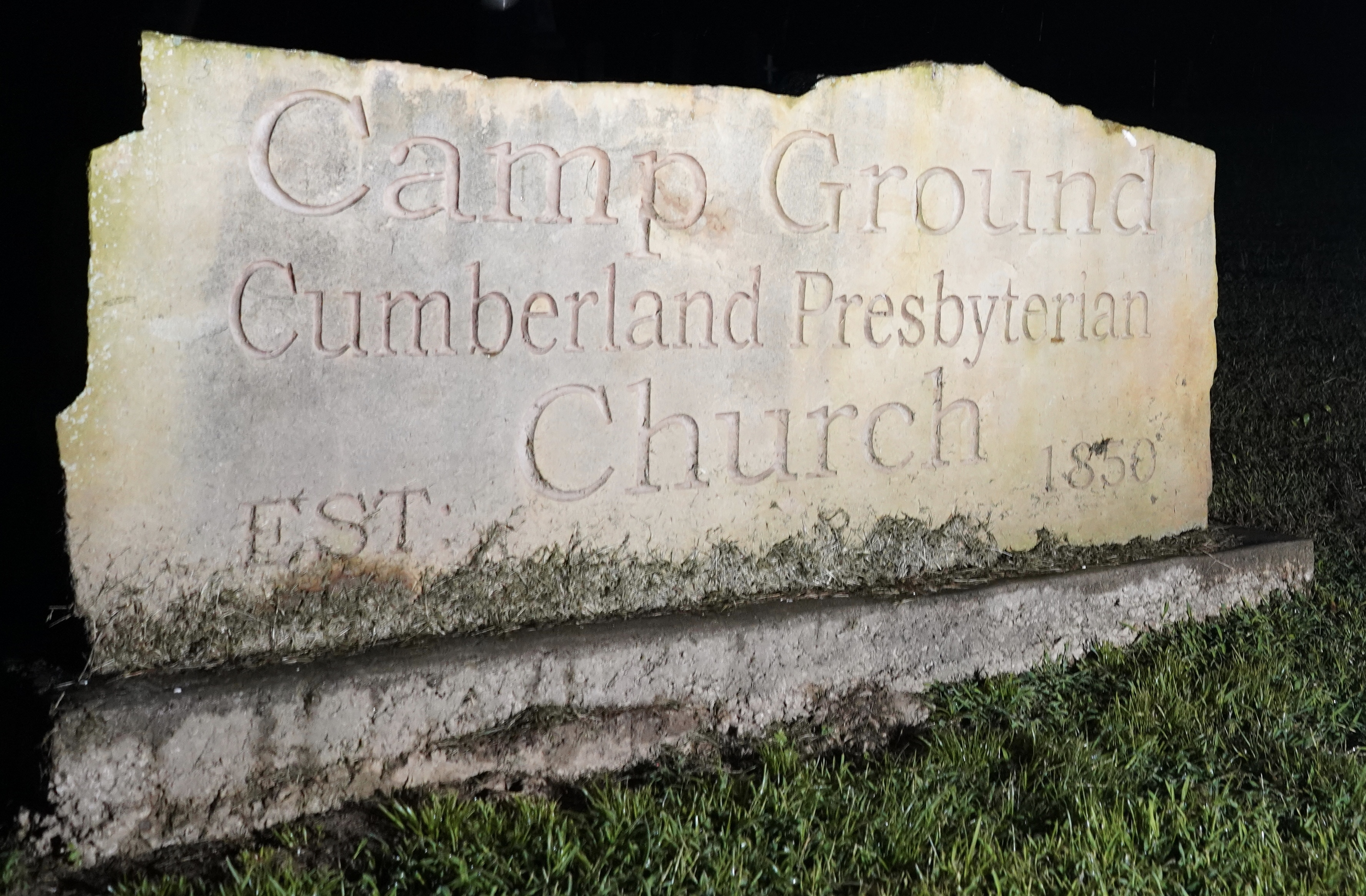

- Location within Illinois Location within the United States
- Location: 50 Tunnel Ln., Anna, Illinois
- Coordinates: 37°27′39″N 89°08′19″W
- NRHP reference No.: 100000965
- Added to NRHP: May 8, 2017

The Campground Church and Cemetery Site is a historic church and cemetery complex located at 50 Tunnel Lane near Anna, Illinois. The site began as a religious campground and local cemetery for the area's Presbyterian congregation; a church was added to the site in 1906. In 1838–39, when the Trail of Tears passed through Illinois, Cherokee who were removed from their homeland used the site as a campground. The campground included two springs, which were used as a source of fresh water for the Cherokee and their animals, and a gristmill run by local landowner George Hileman. In addition, several Cherokee children are buried in unmarked graves in the cemetery; the Trail of Tears was deadly for many of those who were forced to travel it, and children were among the most common victims. It is suspected that Hileman allowed the Cherokee to bury their dead in the local cemetery out of sympathy, as his own sons had died recently, though he may have also done so out of a sense of obligation toward fellow Christians.

The site was added to the National Register of Historic Places on May 8, 2017.
