= Jonesboro Elementary School District =

School district in Union County, Illinois, United States

Address
- 309 Cook Avenue Jonesboro, Illinois, 62952; United States

District information
- Type: Public
- Grades: PreK–8
- NCES District ID: 1720640

Students and staff
- Students: 349

Other information
- Website: www.jonesboro43.com

Jonesboro Community Consolidated School District #43, often known as Jonesboro Elementary School District, is an elementary and middle school district headquartered in Jonesboro, Illinois. It operates Jonesboro Elementary School (JES).

== See also ==
- Anna-Jonesboro Community High School - The local high school, operated by its own district
