= Stinson Memorial Library =

- U.S. National Register of Historic Places
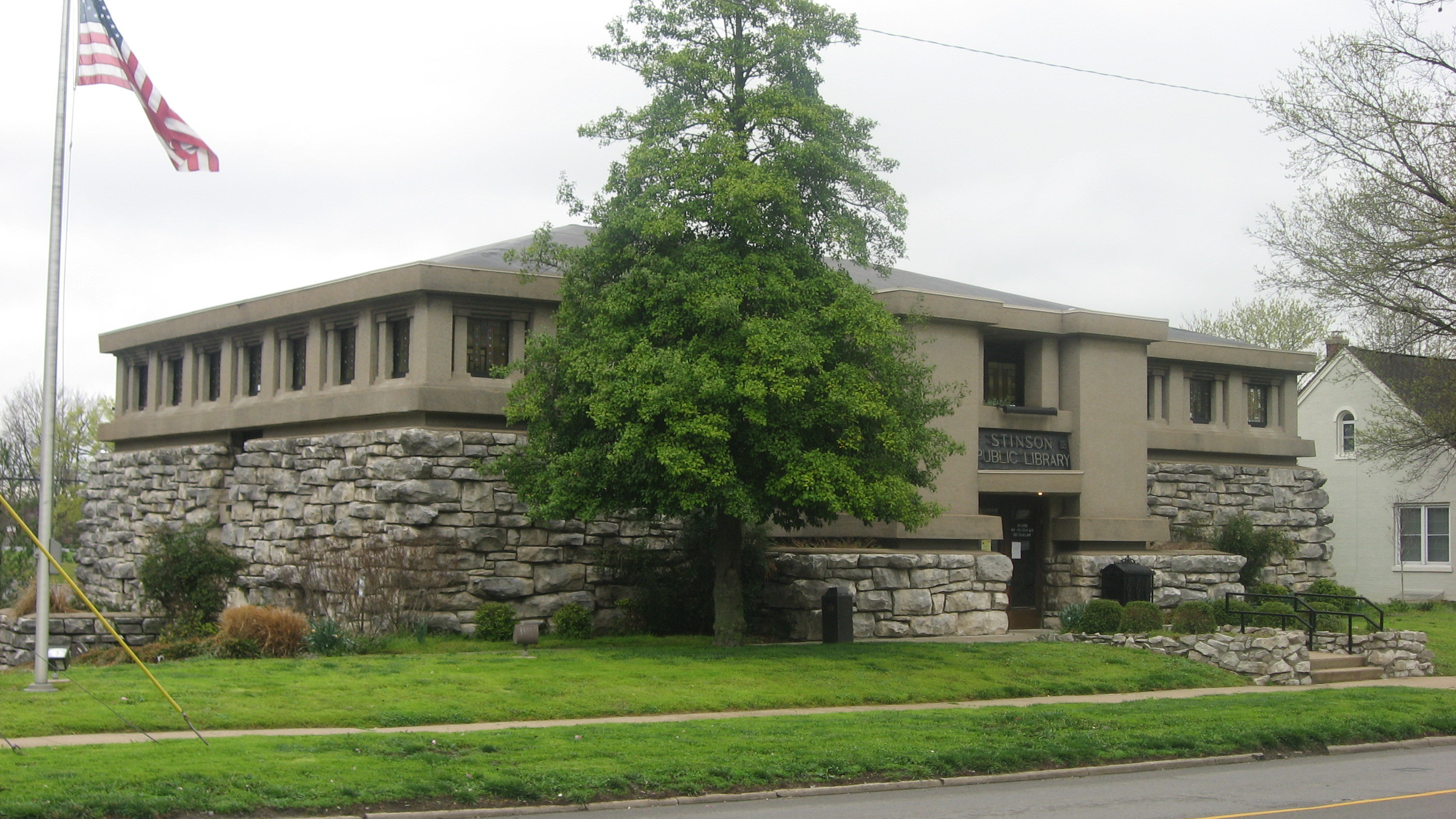

- Location within Illinois Location within the United States
- Location: 409 S. Main St., Anna, Illinois
- Coordinates: 37°27′30″N 89°15′06″W
- Area: less than one acre
- Built: 1913-14
- Architect: Griffin, Walter Burley
- Architectural style: Prairie School, Expressionist
- NRHP reference No.: 78001193
- Added to NRHP: June 9, 1978

The Stinson Memorial Library is a public library located at 409 S. Main St. in Anna, Illinois. The library was designed by Walter Burley Griffin in 1913 and constructed in 1913–14. It was added to the National Register of Historic Places on June 9, 1978.

== Architecture ==
Walter Burley Griffin studied under Frank Lloyd Wright, and while his early work was similar to Wright's Prairie School designs, his later work exhibited an Expressionist influence as well; the Stinson Memorial Library was one of the latter designs. The building's exterior consists of three main design elements: a tall limestone base, a concrete band of windows encircling the top of the base, and large concrete pillars on either side of the entrance. The limestone in the base is roughly cut and coursed to give the building a natural appearance. The windows in the upper band are made from leaded glass and feature concrete piers on each side. The sill and lintel of the windows continuously circle the building; the lintel is topped by the library's low hip roof.

The library's entrance leads to a vestibule with three flights of stairs, one heading to the upper-level library and two to the lower-level auditorium. The library was designed as a single open room with bookshelves delineating the different areas within the space. The room is accentuated by decorative light fixtures and stained glass patterns. The auditorium, which features a stage for performances, is lit by five windows on the rear side of the building.

== History ==
In 1903, Anna businessman Robert Burns Stinson bequeathed his estate to the city to fund a public library. By 1913, the donation had grown large enough to fund the construction of a library, and Griffin was hired to design the building. While the lowest bid on the library initially came from a contractor in St. Louis, Griffin hired F. P. Mueller of Chicago to construct the building, as he was concerned that the original contractor could not carry out his design. Work on the building began in 1913 and was completed in 1914. The library was dedicated on August 14, 1914, shortly after Griffin relocated to Australia; it was one of the last buildings Griffin designed in America. The building has only undergone minor alterations since its construction and still serves as Anna's public library.
