= Minnie A. Buzbee =

American banker (1880–1955)

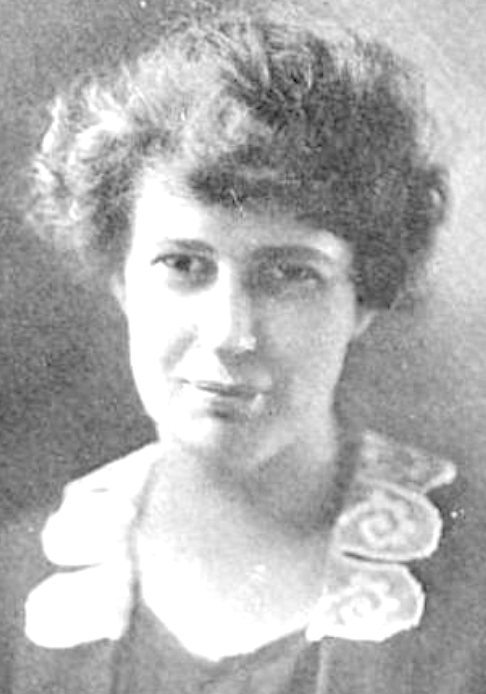
- Minnie A. Buzbee, from a 1923 trade journal
- Born: Minnie Ann Buzbee; April 6, 1880; Little Rock, Arkansas
- Died: January 29, 1955 (aged 74); Little Rock, Arkansas
- Occupations: Banker, advertising executive, clubwoman

Minnie A. Buzbee (April 6, 1880 – January 29, 1955) was an American bank executive. She specialized in financial advertising, and was in charge of the advertising and publicity departments of several banks in the 1920s.

== Early life ==
Minnie Ann Buzbee was born in Little Rock, Arkansas, the daughter of John Stephen Buzbee and Emma Spears Buzbee.

== Career ==
Buzbee began her career in banking as secretary to George W. Rogers, a bank vice president in Arkansas. By 1919 she was the publicity department manager of American Bank of Commerce and Trust Co., based in Little Rock. She was a founder and secretary of the Advertising Club of Little Rock. She spoke at the World's Advertisers Convention in Atlanta in 1921.

In 1922, Buzbee joined the Harvey Blodgett Company, based in New York and Minnesota, where she established the service department. While in New York, she was a member of the New York League of Advertising Women. In Minnesota, she was head of advertising at Hennepin County Savings Bank, and became manager of the advertising department at Minneapolis Trust Company in 1925.

In 1927, Buzbee moved back to Arkansas, and joined the staff of the Burton E. Vaughan advertising agency. She was a national director of the Financial Advertisers Association. In 1929, she was elected regional vice president of the Association of Bank Women. She was also active in the National Federation of Business and Professional Women, organizing a national campaign on thrift and financial security in 1930. In 1946, she wrote a history of the Winfield Memorial Methodist Church in Little Rock.

Buzbee wrote about women in banking for The Arkansas Banker in 1919: "The war has bridged over many years in the economic development of women, and neither the women themselves nor the world at large will ever be content to have them go back to their old status," she declared.

== Personal life ==
Buzbee died in 1955, in Little Rock.
