= Anna-Jonesboro Community High School =

High school in Anna, Illinois, United States

Coordinates: 37°27′21″N 89°15′18″W

Location
- 608 South Main Street; Anna, (Union County), Illinois 62906; United States

Information
- Type: Public high school
- School district: Anna-Jonesboro Community High School District 81
- Principal: Brett Detering
- Staff: 35.00 (FTE)
- Enrollment: 476 (2024-2025)
- Student to teacher ratio: 13.60
- Colors: Royal blue and white
- Nickname: Wildcats

Anna-Jonesboro Community High School (AJCHS) is an American high school located in Anna, Illinois. Its principal is Mr. Brett Detering. It serves Anna and Jonesboro. It is a part of Anna-Jonesboro Community High School District 81.

In 2019 all of the teachers were non-Hispanic white.

== Notable alumni ==
- Clyde L. Choate, Medal of Honor winner and member of the Illinois House of Representatives
- John J. Pelley (1878–1946), railroad executive

== See also ==
Elementary and middle school districts serving Anna and Jonesboro:

- Anna Community Consolidated School District 37
- Jonesboro Elementary School District
