= Ware, Illinois =

Ware
- Unincorporated community
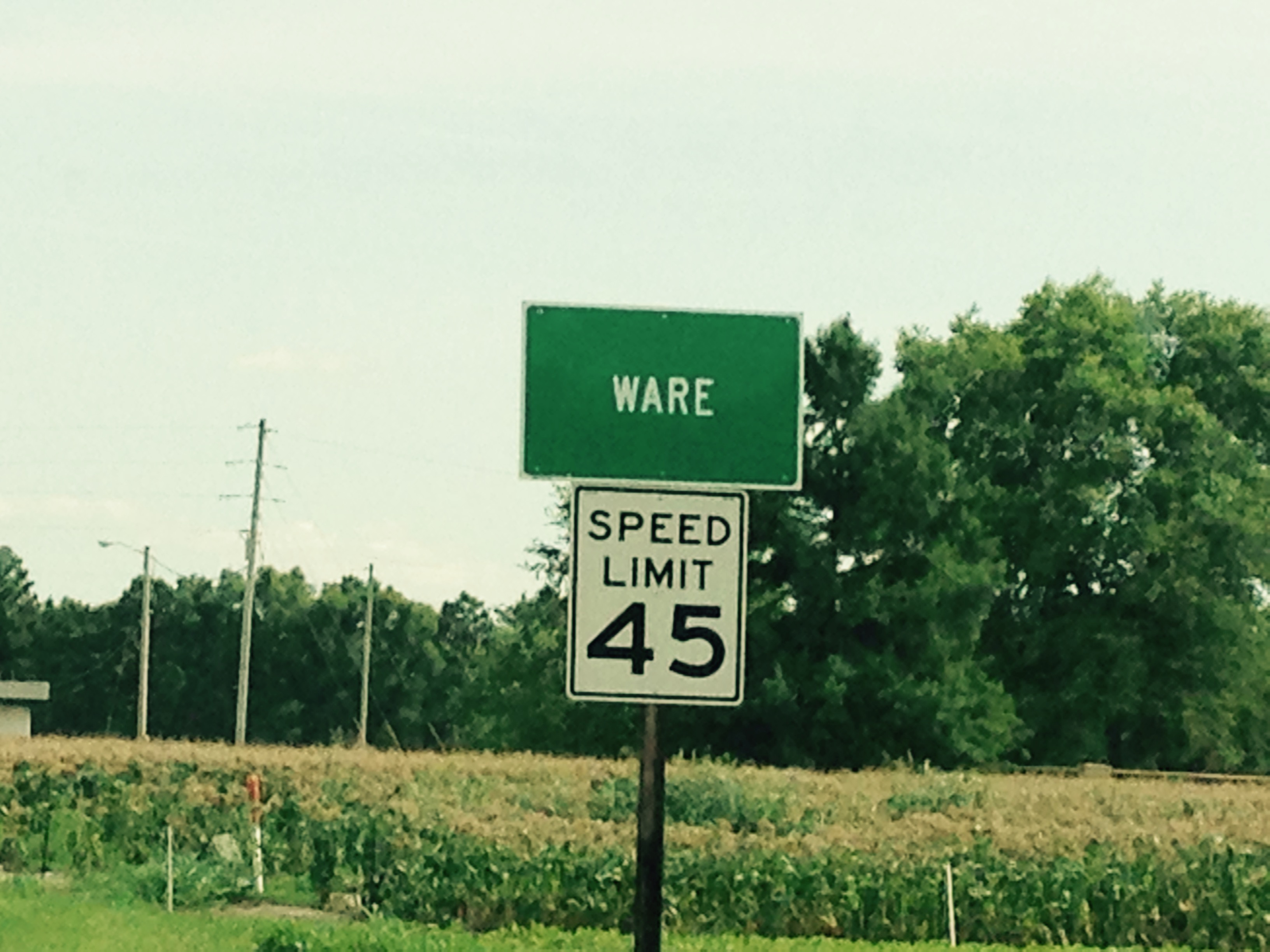
- Highway 3 sign

- Location of Ware within Illinois Ware (the United States)
- Coordinates: 37°26′52″N 89°23′38″W
- Country: United States
- State: Illinois
- County: Union
- Elevation: 351 ft (107 m)
- Time zone: UTC-6 (CST)
  - Summer (DST): UTC-5 (CDT)
- Postal code: 62952
- Area code: 618

Ware is an unincorporated community in Union County, Illinois, and is located near Jonesboro.

The Illinois Central Railroad and Illinois Route 3 pass through Ware, Illinois, connecting the community to the rest of the state. Two churches, Ware Baptist Church and Ware United Methodist Church, provide religious services.

== History ==
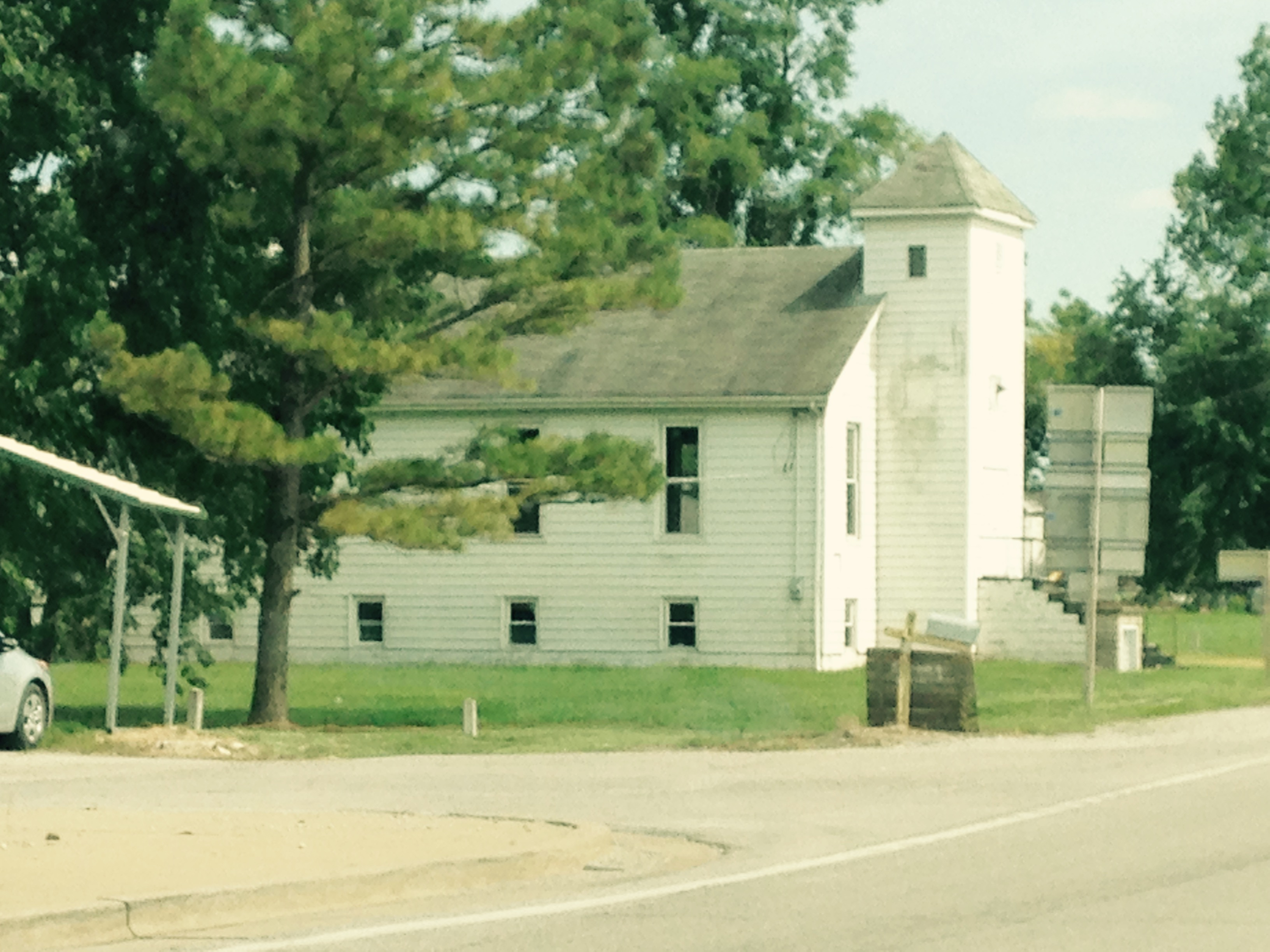
Ware Baptist Church

The earliest inhabitants of the area around Ware were of Late Woodland and Mississippian cultures. A village with four mounds was occupied between around 800 and 1300 A.D. One of the four mounds was destroyed in the construction of Illinois Route 3. The Ware Mounds and Village Site is situated just west of Ware. In January 1839, thousands of Cherokee Indians being forcibly relocated from their lands in Georgia to Indian Territory (Oklahoma) passed through Ware. Because of floating ice the Cherokee were unable to cross the Mississippi River and camped along Dutch Creek. The intense cold at this time led to many deaths.

== 2000 Census ==
As of Census 2000, the population is 3,422 It is named for politician and farmer Jesse Ware.
