= Kenneth Buzbee =

American politician and businessman (1937–2025)

Member of the Illinois Senate
- In office 1973–1985

Personal details
- Born: Kenneth V. Buzbee; November 30, 1937 Anna, Illinois, U.S.
- Died: June 5, 2025 (aged 87)
- Party: Democratic
- Education: Southern Illinois University
- Occupation: Politician, businessman

Military service
- Allegiance: United States
- Branch/service: United States Marine Corps
- Rank: Lieutenant colonel

Kenneth V. Buzbee (November 30, 1937 – June 5, 2025) was an American politician and businessman. Buzbee served as a Democratic member of the Illinois Senate from 1973 to 1985.

== Life and career ==
Born in Anna, Illinois, Buzbee received his bachelor's degree in communication and his master's degree in political science from Southern Illinois University where he was a member of Phi Kappa Tau Fraternity. He served in the United States Marine Corps and was commissioned a lieutenant colonel. He worked for the Illinois Eastern Community Colleges and for the Illinois Secretary of State. Buzbee served in the Illinois Senate from 1973 to 1985. While in the Senate, Buzbee was a member of the Democratic Study Group, a group of between eight and eleven independent Democrats dubbed the "Crazy 8" by political observers. With the Crazy 8, he was able to leverage himself a position as the chairman of the Appropriations II committee. In 1984, Buzbee lost the Democratic primary for the United States House of Representatives to Kenneth J. Gray. After his time in the Senate, he would be lobbyist representing the City of Chicago during Harold Washington's mayoralty.

In 1992, Buzbee ran for Illinois Senate in the 58th district against Republican incumbent Ralph A. Dunn. Despite the apparent Democratic lean of the district, Dunn defeated Buzbee's comeback effort. Upon taking office as Illinois Secretary of State in 1999, Jesse White hired Buzbee to serve as the Director of Business Services. Buzbee died on June 5, 2025, at the age of 87.
