= Reynoldsville, Illinois =

Reynoldsville
- Unincorporated community
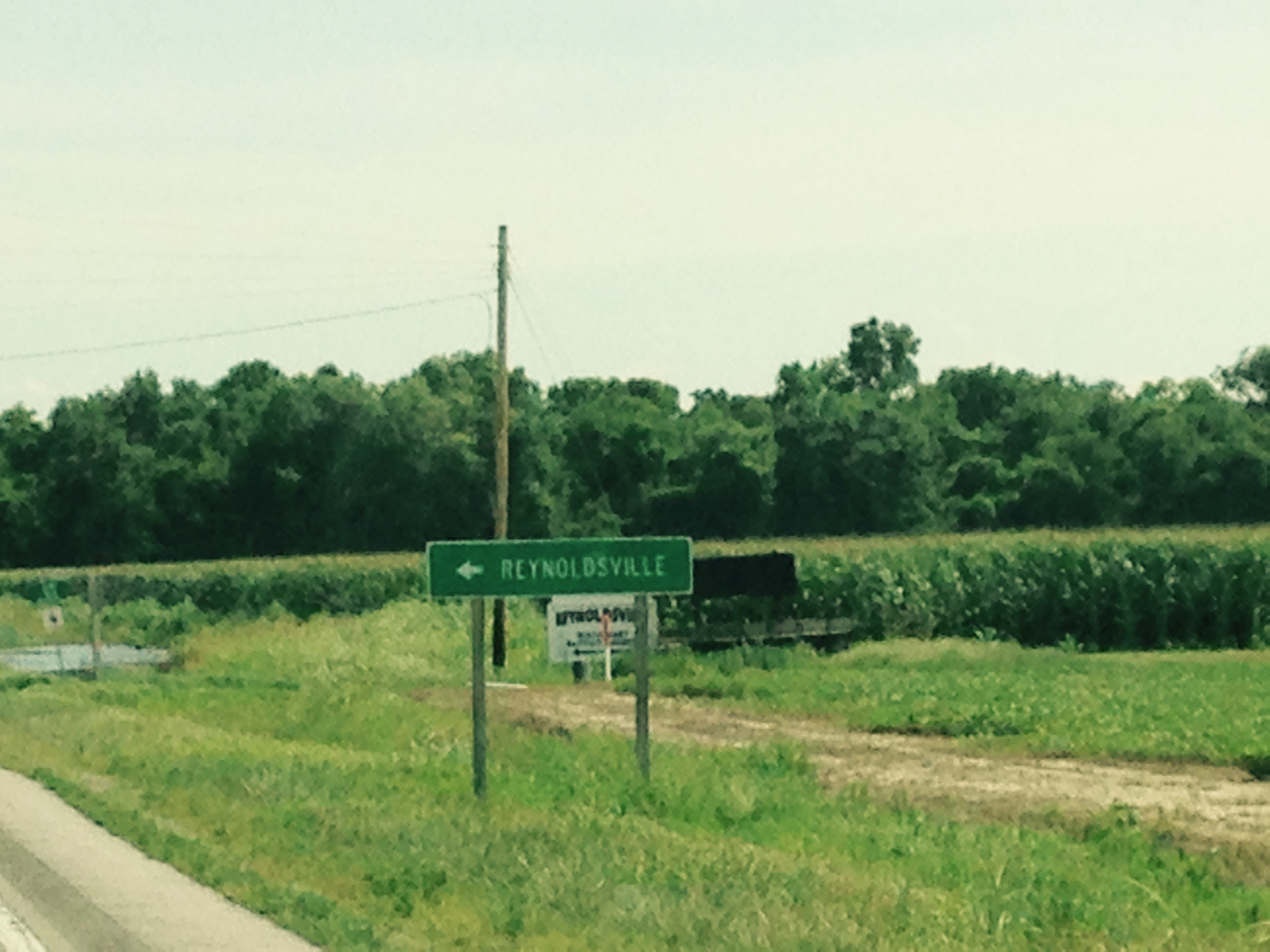
- Illinois Route 3 roadsign

- Location of Reynoldsville within Illinois Reynoldsville (the United States)
- Coordinates: 37°22′02″N 89°23′42″W
- Country: United States
- State: Illinois
- County: Union
- Elevation: 341 ft (104 m)
- Time zone: UTC-6 (CST)
  - Summer (DST): UTC-5 (CDT)
- Postal code: 62952
- Area code: 618

Reynoldsville is an unincorporated community in Union County, Illinois, United States. The community is along Illinois Route 3 and 146, just north of McClure and across the Mississippi River from Cape Girardeau, Missouri.

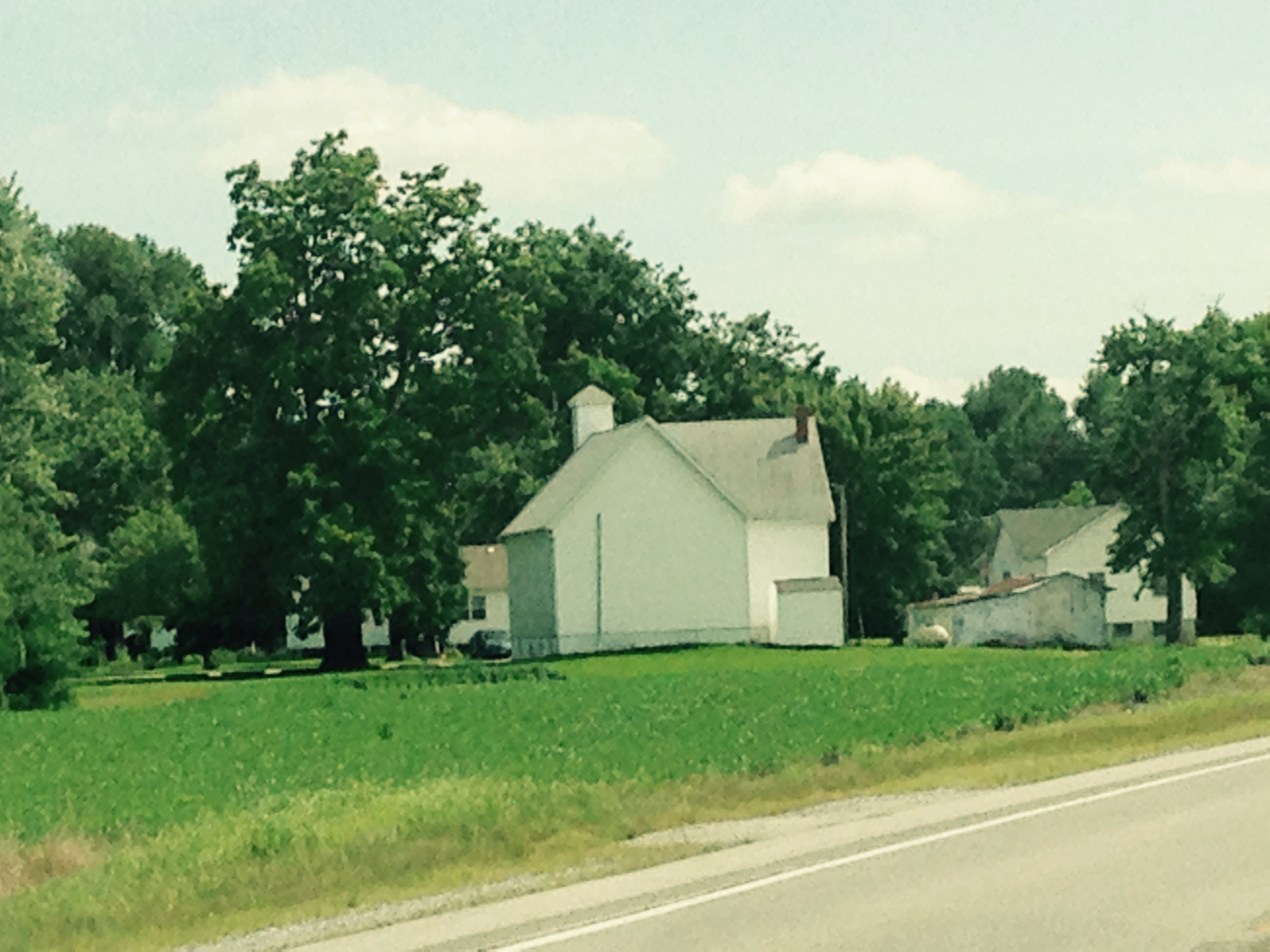
Gospel of the Kingdom church

The unincorporated community has a major railroad passing through. A fishing lake, Lyerla Lake, is just to the east. Kornthal Church from 1852 is located in the community and Old Cape Road connects with Illinois Route 127.
