= Anna Community Consolidated School District 37 =

School district in Illinois, United States

Address
- 301 South Green Street Anna, Illinois, 62906; United States

District information
- Type: Public
- Grades: PreK–8
- NCES District ID: 1703750

Students and staff
- Students: 634

Other information
- Website: www.anna37.com

Anna Community Consolidated School District #37, or Anna District 37, is a school district headquartered in the Anna Junior High School/Davie School facility in Anna, Illinois.

The district operates elementary and middle schools. Anna-Jonesboro Community High School is operated by its own district.

== Schools ==
- Anna Jr High School (grades 5-8) and Davie School (grades 3-4) - in same building
- Lincoln School (Kindergarten-Grade 2)
- Pre-K
