= Jonesboro, Illinois =

- City
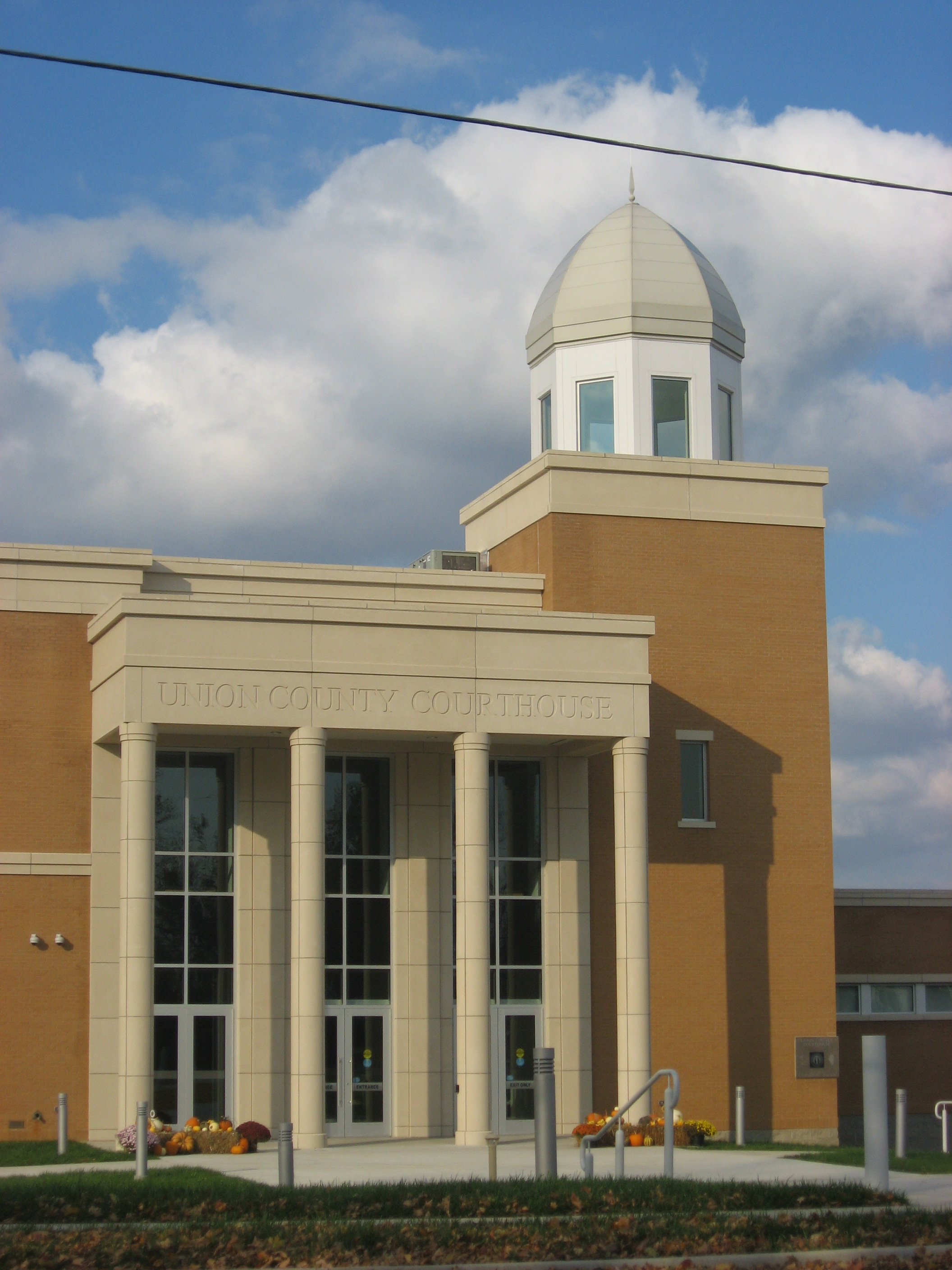
- Union County Courthouse
- Interactive map of Jonesboro, Illinois
- Location within Illinois Location within the United States
- Coordinates: 37°27′4″N 89°16′7″W
- Country: United States
- State: Illinois
- County: Union

Area
  - Total: 2.71 sq mi (7.01 km^{2})
  - Land: 2.70 sq mi (6.99 km^{2})
  - Water: 0.0039 sq mi (0.01 km^{2})
- Elevation: 518 ft (158 m)

Population (2020)
  - Total: 1,711
  - Density: 633.6/sq mi (244.63/km^{2})
- Time zone: UTC-6 (CST)
  - Summer (DST): UTC-5 (CDT)
- ZIP Code(s): 62952
- Area code: 618
- FIPS code: 17-38635
- GNIS feature ID: 2395480
- Wikimedia Commons: Jonesboro, Illinois
- Website: www.cojil.org

Jonesboro (/ˈdʒoʊnzbʌrə/) is a city in Union County, Illinois, United States. As of the 2020 census, Jonesboro had a population of 1,711. It is the county seat of Union County. The city is known for being tied to its close neighbor Anna, together known as Anna-Jonesboro.

== History ==
Jonesboro was named for Doctor Jones, a pioneer settler. It was the location of the third of the Lincoln-Douglas debates, on September 15, 1858. The Trail of Tears State Forest is nearby.

== Geography ==
Jonesboro is located at 37°27′4″N 89°16′7″W (37.451126, -89.268566).

According to the 2010 census, Jonesboro has a total area of 2.706 square miles (7.01 km^{2}), of which 2.7 square miles (6.99 km^{2}) (or 99.78%) is land and 0.006 square miles (0.02 km^{2}) (or 0.22%) is water.

== Demographics ==
Historical population
Census	Pop.	Note	%±
1850	584		—
1860	842		44.2%
1870	1,108		31.6%
1880	879		−20.7%
1900	1,130		—
1910	1,169		3.5%
1920	1,090		−6.8%
1930	1,241		13.9%
1940	1,521		22.6%
1950	1,607		5.7%
1960	1,636		1.8%
1970	1,676		2.4%
1980	1,842		9.9%
1990	1,728		−6.2%
2000	1,853		7.2%
2010	1,821		−1.7%
2020	1,711		−6.0%
U.S. Decennial Census

=== 2020 census ===
As of the 2020 census, Jonesboro had a population of 1,711. The median age was 41.4 years. 23.4% of residents were under the age of 18 and 19.8% of residents were 65 years of age or older. For every 100 females there were 91.4 males, and for every 100 females age 18 and over there were 88.2 males age 18 and over.

81.7% of residents lived in urban areas, while 18.3% lived in rural areas.

There were 699 households in Jonesboro, of which 31.3% had children under the age of 18 living in them. Of all households, 44.3% were married-couple households, 15.6% were households with a male householder and no spouse or partner present, and 31.8% were households with a female householder and no spouse or partner present. About 29.3% of all households were made up of individuals and 14.6% had someone living alone who was 65 years of age or older.

There were 794 housing units, of which 12.0% were vacant. The homeowner vacancy rate was 2.9% and the rental vacancy rate was 16.1%.

Racial composition as of the 2020 census
Race	Number	Percent
White	1,589	92.9%
Black or African American	9	0.5%
American Indian and Alaska Native	7	0.4%
Asian	7	0.4%
Native Hawaiian and Other Pacific Islander	0	0.0%
Some other race	22	1.3%
Two or more races	77	4.5%
Hispanic or Latino (of any race)	62	3.6%

=== 2000 census ===
As of the census of 2000, there were 1,853 people, 740 households, and 489 families residing in the city. The population density was 968.0 inhabitants per square mile (373.7/km^{2}). There were 792 housing units at an average density of 413.7 per square mile (159.7/km^{2}). The racial makeup of the city was 96.87% White, 0.65% African American, 0.59% Native American, 0.59% Asian, 0.76% from other races, and 0.54% from two or more races. Hispanic or Latino of any race were 1.19% of the population.

There were 740 households, out of which 31.5% had children under the age of 18 living with them, 51.2% were married couples living together, 11.6% had a female householder with no husband present, and 33.9% were non-families. 30.8% of all households were made up of individuals, and 17.6% had someone living alone who was 65 years of age or older. The average household size was 2.35 and the average family size was 2.95.

In the city, the population was spread out, with 24.1% under the age of 18, 8.0% from 18 to 24, 25.6% from 25 to 44, 23.3% from 45 to 64, and 19.0% who were 65 years of age or older. The median age was 40 years. For every 100 females, there were 89.9 males. For every 100 females age 18 and over, there were 83.2 males.

The median income for a household in the city was $30,441, and the median income for a family was $40,066. Males had a median income of $31,691 versus $24,464 for females. The per capita income for the city was $15,372. About 12.5% of families and 17.1% of the population were below the poverty line, including 17.9% of those under age 18 and 18.2% of those age 65 or over.

== Education ==
The community is served by Jonesboro Elementary School District, which operates Jonesboro Elementary School (JES), and by Anna-Jonesboro Community High School in Anna.
