= Anna, Illinois =

City in Union County, Illinois, United States

- City
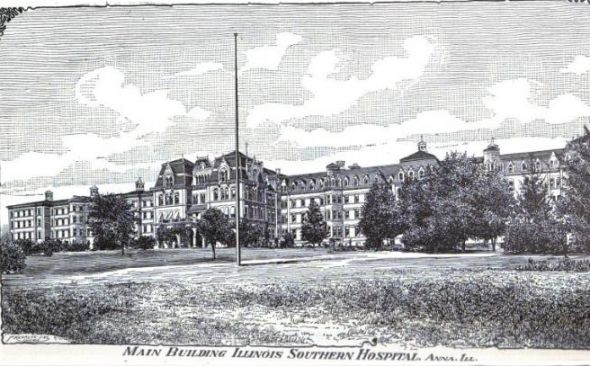
- The Anna State Asylum, built in 1869 in the Kirkbride Plan was a rambling four-story structure, part of which was destroyed in separate incidents, but most of which is still standing as the central complex to the C.L. Choate Mental Health and Developmental Center.

- Seal Logo
- Interactive map of Anna, Illinois
- Location within Illinois Location within the United States
- Coordinates: 37°27′40″N 89°14′20″W
- Country: United States
- State: Illinois
- County: Union
- Platted: March 3, 1854
- Incorporated: February 16, 1865

Government
  - Mayor: Steve Hartline

Area
  - Total: 3.58 sq mi (9.27 km^{2})
  - Land: 3.56 sq mi (9.22 km^{2})
  - Water: 0.019 sq mi (0.05 km^{2})
- Elevation: 617 ft (188 m)

Population (2020)
  - Total: 4,303
  - Density: 1,209/sq mi (467/km^{2})
- Time zone: UTC-6 (CST)
  - Summer (DST): UTC-5 (CDT)
- ZIP code: 62906
- Area code: 618
- FIPS code: 17-01543
- GNIS feature ID: 2393961
- Website: cityofanna.org

Anna is the largest city and retail trade center in Union County, Illinois, United States. Located in Southern Illinois, its population was 4,303 at the 2020 United States census, a decline from 5,135 in 2000. It is known for being tied to its close neighbor Jonesboro, together known as Anna-Jonesboro, and of which the main public high school for the two towns is named. Anna is known for the Choate Mental Health and Development Center, a state facility that opened in 1869.

== History ==
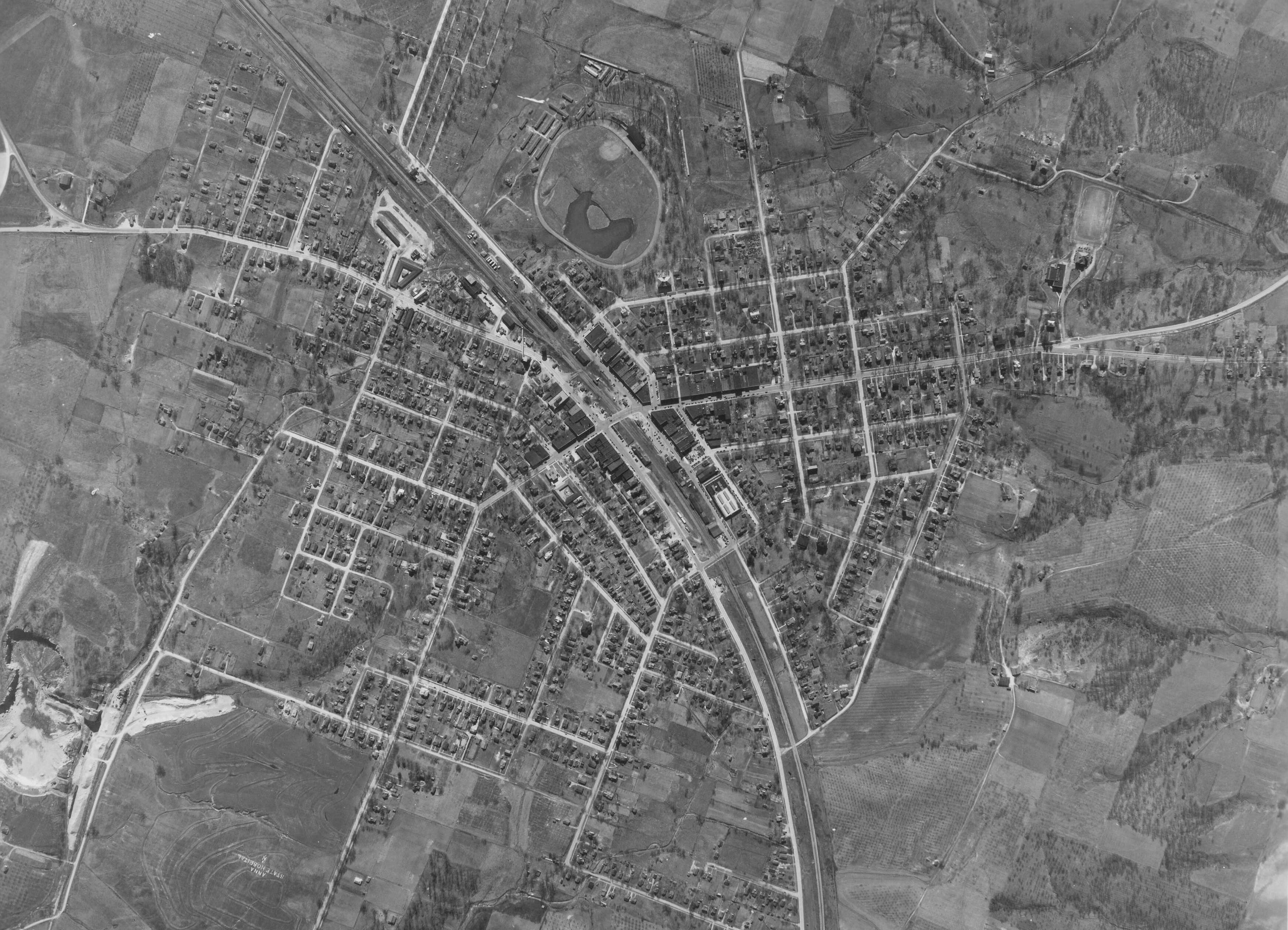
Anna, 1938

Anna was platted on March 3, 1854, after the new Illinois Central Railroad established a station there. It was founded by Winstead Davie and named after Anna Davie, his wife. It was then incorporated on February 16, 1865.

The coming of the railroad can be credited for prompting the founding of the City of Anna, although, from the time of the George Rogers Clark expedition into Southern Illinois country, emigrants recognized its agricultural possibilities. Centrally located in Anna Precinct of Union County, Anna was established by ordinance following the election of Trustees in 1855, although the plot was recorded in the county records on March 3, 1854. The area's elevation and fertile soil have made fruit farming—particularly the growth of grapes for winemaking—one of the area's principal businesses. For the purpose of farming, fruit growing, gardening, and dairying, the lands in and around Anna are not surpassed in Southern Illinois. The precinct in which Anna lies is situated on the divide between the waters of the Ohio and Mississippi Rivers and is well drained by the Cache, Cypress, and Big Creeks. Many cool springs of water aid materially in cattle farming in this area.

In 1859, brothers Cornwall and Wallace Kirkpatrick started Anna Pottery in Anna. Their work became well-known and later, collector's items; one of their most descriptive pieces was a pig from which wine could be consumed. The business ran until 1900, according to an exhibit at the Union County Historical Society Museum in Cobden.

During the American Civil War, Camp Anna in 1862 was the mustering and training location for some Illinois Infantry regiments, including the 81st, 109th, and 110th. There have been various commemorations ever since, including: 2013 and 2022.

Sentiments in Union County for the north and south were clearly divided during the war. Contemporary newspapers were blatantly political. The Anna Democrat continued publication, while the Jonesboro Gazette was denied its constitutional right to freedom of the press from 15 May 1863 until it was allowed to resume publication on 5 March 1864. The newspapers were consolidated to form The Gazette-Democrat on 26 October 1939.

Anna is home to the Union County Fair, which began in 1880.

In 1909, town residents attempted to drive out the black families who lived in Anna, after the lynching of William "Froggie" James in the nearby town of Cairo, Illinois, for the alleged rape and murder of Anna resident Anna Pelley. Anna was historically a sundown town, in which African Americans were excluded from living in the town's limits. Though the town was named after Anna Davie, the wife of the town's founder, some outsiders believed that the town's name was an acronym for "Ain't No Niggers Allowed". The town has become infamous for it by its portrayal in literature and film. The phrase is still well-known, with few non-white residents owing in part to its historical reputation. Signs using a pejorative for Black people warning them not to let the sun go down on you in Anna persisted on Highway 127 until the 1970s.

The Stinson Memorial Library is a public library located at 409 South Main Street in Anna, Illinois. The library was designed by Walter Burley Griffin, an understudy to Frank Lloyd Wright, in 1913 and constructed in 1913–14. It was added to the National Register of Historic Places on June 9, 1978.

Lewis Bakeries, the makers of Bunny Bread, was founded in 1925. Lewis started the company with a $300 loan against his mother's house, and by 1987, the company was reportedly earning $80 million in annual sales. Founder Jack Lewis died in September 2001 at the age of 91. Bunny Bread itself was created in 1947, according to the Bunny Bread website.

== Geography ==
Anna is located at 37°27′40″N 89°14′20″W.

According to the 2010 census, Anna has a total area of 3.519 square miles (9.11 km^{2}), of which 3.5 sq mi (9.06 km^{2}) (or 99.46%) is land and 0.019 sq mi (0.05 km^{2}) (or 0.54%) is water.

== Demographics ==
Historical population
| Census | Pop. | Note | %± |
|---|---|---|---|
| 1860 | 769 | | — |
| 1870 | 1,269 | | 65.0% |
| 1880 | 1,494 | | 17.7% |
| 1890 | 2,295 | | 53.6% |
| 1900 | 2,618 | | 14.1% |
| 1910 | 2,809 | | 7.3% |
| 1920 | 3,019 | | 7.5% |
| 1930 | 3,436 | | 13.8% |
| 1940 | 4,092 | | 19.1% |
| 1950 | 4,380 | | 7.0% |
| 1960 | 4,280 | | −2.3% |
| 1970 | 4,766 | | 11.4% |
| 1980 | 5,408 | | 13.5% |
| 1990 | 4,805 | | −11.2% |
| 2000 | 5,136 | | 6.9% |
| 2010 | 4,442 | | −13.5% |
| 2020 | 4,303 | | −3.1% |
U.S. Decennial Census

=== 2020 census ===
As of the 2020 census, Anna had a population of 4,303. The median age was 44.2 years. 20.6% of residents were under the age of 18 and 22.8% of residents were 65 years of age or older. For every 100 females there were 92.5 males, and for every 100 females age 18 and over there were 89.9 males age 18 and over.

95.4% of residents lived in urban areas, while 4.6% lived in rural areas.

There were 1,857 households in Anna, of which 25.3% had children under the age of 18 living in them. Of all households, 32.4% were married-couple households, 20.5% were households with a male householder and no spouse or partner present, and 39.7% were households with a female householder and no spouse or partner present. About 40.6% of all households were made up of individuals and 19.8% had someone living alone who was 65 years of age or older.

There were 2,093 housing units, of which 11.3% were vacant. The homeowner vacancy rate was 3.1% and the rental vacancy rate was 11.8%.

Racial composition as of the 2020 census
| Race | Number | Percent |
|---|---|---|
| White | 3,856 | 89.6% |
| Black or African American | 76 | 1.8% |
| American Indian and Alaska Native | 21 | 0.5% |
| Asian | 30 | 0.7% |
| Native Hawaiian and Other Pacific Islander | 6 | 0.1% |
| Some other race | 58 | 1.3% |
| Two or more races | 256 | 5.9% |
| Hispanic or Latino (of any race) | 171 | 4.0% |

=== 2010 census ===
As of the census of 2010, there were 4,442 people, 1,893 households and 1,097 families residing in the city. The population density was 1,269.1 people per square mile. There were 2,123 housing units at an average density of 606.6 per square mile. The racial makeup of the city was 95.7% White, 1.1% African American, 0.6% American Indian and Alaskan Native, 0.4% Asian, <0.1% Pacific Islander, 1.2% from other races, and .9% from two or more races. Hispanic or Latino people (of any race) were 2.9% of the population.

There were 1,893 households, out of which 24.2% had children under the age of 18 living with them, 42.6% were married couples living together, 14.1% had a female householder with no husband present, 4.8% had a male householder with no wife present and 42.0% were non-families. 37.8% of all households were made up of individuals, and 21.0% had someone living alone who was 65 years of age or older. The average household size was 2.19 and the average family size was 2.85.

In the city, the population was spread out, with 22.7% aged 19 and younger, 7.0% from 20 to 24, 22.7% from 25 to 44, 24.5% from 45 to 64, and 23.0% who were 65 years of age or older. The median age was 42.8 years. For every 100 females, there were 91.7 males.

=== Income and poverty ===
The median income for a household in the city was $39,602, the median income for a family was $44,420. The incomes of 20.2% of the population were below the poverty level.

== Education ==
Public schools in Anna include Anna Jr. High School, Lincoln School, all part of Anna District#37, and the Anna-Jonesboro Community High School District #81.

== Notable people ==
- James E. Bonner, U.S. Army major general and commanding general of Fort Leonard Wood
- Delos Brown, pinch hitter for the Chicago White Sox, born in Anna
- Kenneth Buzbee, politician
- Clyde L. Choate, politician and soldier
- Townsend F. Dodd, aviator
- George M.C. Fisher, former CEO of Motorola and Kodak
- Frank E. Midkiff, High Commissioner of the Trust Territory of the Pacific, born in Anna
- King Neptune, famous war bond-raising pig
- John J. Pelley, railroad executive
- Frank Willard, cartoonist

== See also ==
- List of sundown towns in the United States
