= List of songs recorded by Beastie Boys =

List of songs by the Beastie Boys

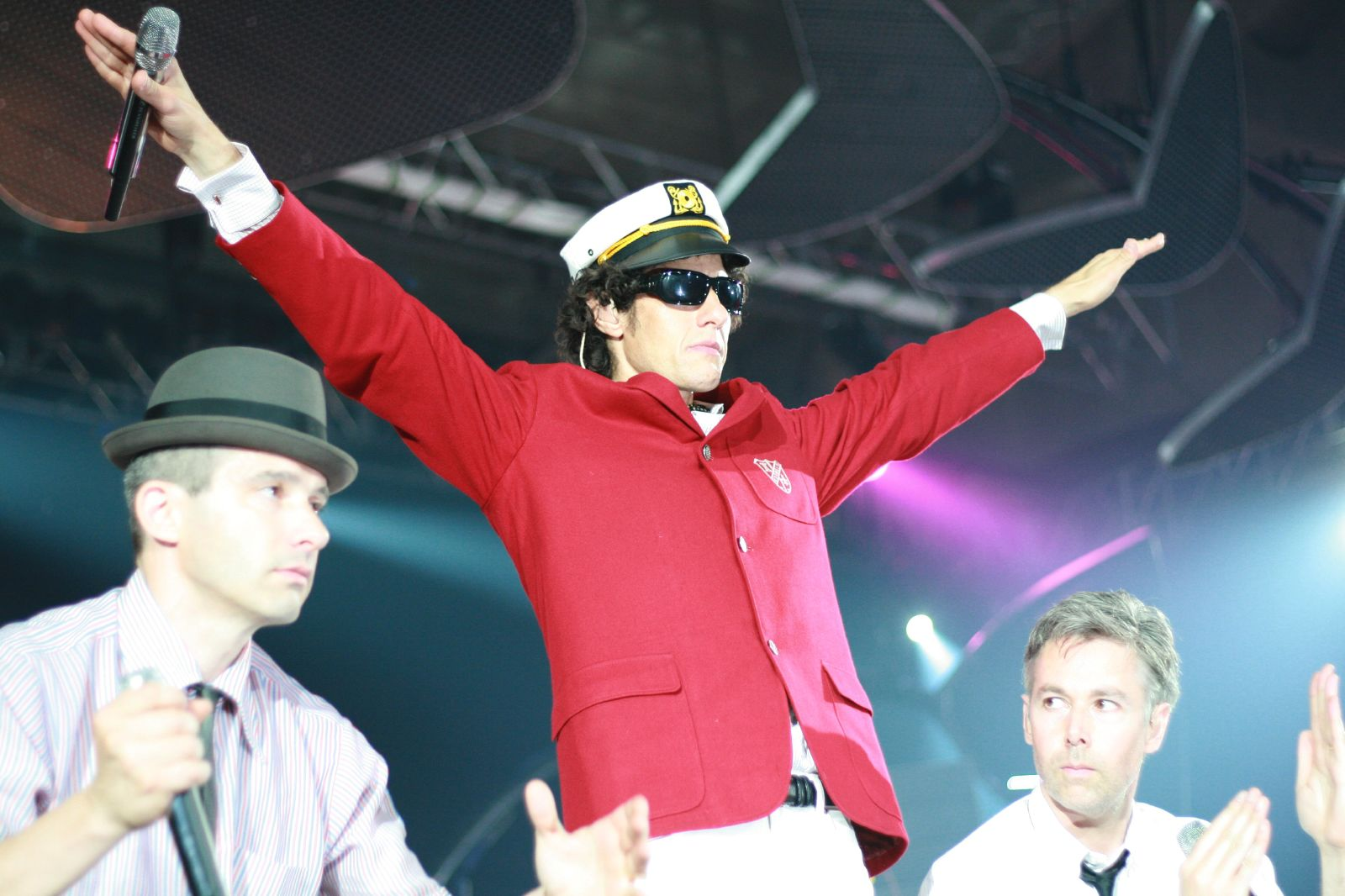
Beastie Boys performing in 2007. Left to right: Ad-Rock, Mike D, and MCA.

The American hip hop group Beastie Boys recorded 177 songs during their career. Active between 1982 and 2012, the group primarily consisted of Michael "Mike D" Diamond, Adam "MCA" Yauch, and Adam "Ad-Rock" Horovitz. Originally a hardcore punk band, the group released their debut single, "Cooky Puss" in 1983, which marked a change in style to a more hip-hop oriented sound. They fully transitioned to rap after signing with Def Jam Recordings in 1984.

With Rick Rubin's assistance on writing and producing, Beastie Boys released the singles "Rock Hard" (1984) and "She's on It" (1985), before releasing their debut studio album, Licensed to Ill (1986). The album blended rock and rap, and featured intricate wordplay between the three members. After leaving Def Jam and signing with Capitol Records, they released their second album, Paul's Boutique, in 1989. Co-produced with the Dust Brothers, the album's songs are almost entirely composed of samples, aside from the group's vocals. Paul's Boutique marked the group's longtime collaboration with Mario Caldato Jr. Check Your Head (1992) featured instrumentation from all three members and was less sample-heavy than their previous albums. The album was also more diverse, featuring elements of alternative and punk rock. Ill Communication (1994) continued the style of Check Your Head and featured their signature song, "Sabotage". Hello Nasty (1998) featured bombastic beats, samples, and more experimentation than their previous albums. The anthology compilation album, The Sounds of Science (1999), contained previously unreleased songs, B-sides, and greatest hits.

To the 5 Boroughs (2004), their first studio album in six years, marked a return to the style of their early 1990s albums, and featured their signature blend of pop culture references and absurdity. The group's next album, the entirely instrumental The Mix-Up (2007), earned the group a Grammy Award for Best Pop Instrumental Album in 2008. In 2009, the group announced their next studio album, Hot Sauce Committee, as a two-part album. Pt. 1 was delayed after Yauch was diagnosed with cancer. A year later, Pt. 1 was shelved indefinitely. Pt. 2, released as Hot Sauce Committee Part Two (2011), contained experimentation reminiscent of Check Your Head and Hello Nasty, as well as old-school raps that contrasted with contemporary hip-hop trends. The album featured guest appearances by Nas and Santigold. A year later, on May 4, 2012, Adam Yauch died of cancer. After his death, Diamond and Horovitz disbanded the group out of respect for Yauch.

== Songs ==
Key
†	Indicates single release

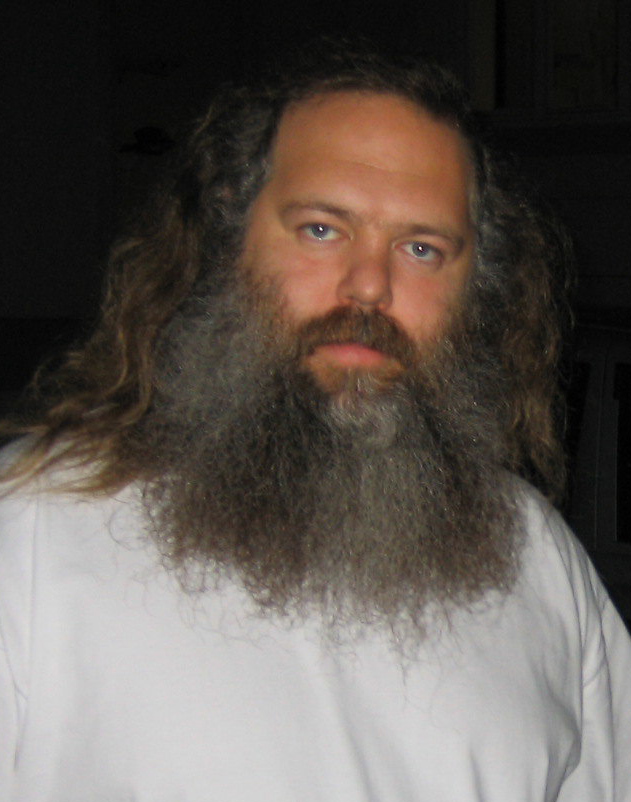
Rick Rubin signed Beastie Boys to his label Def Jam and co-produced their first album, Licensed to Ill.

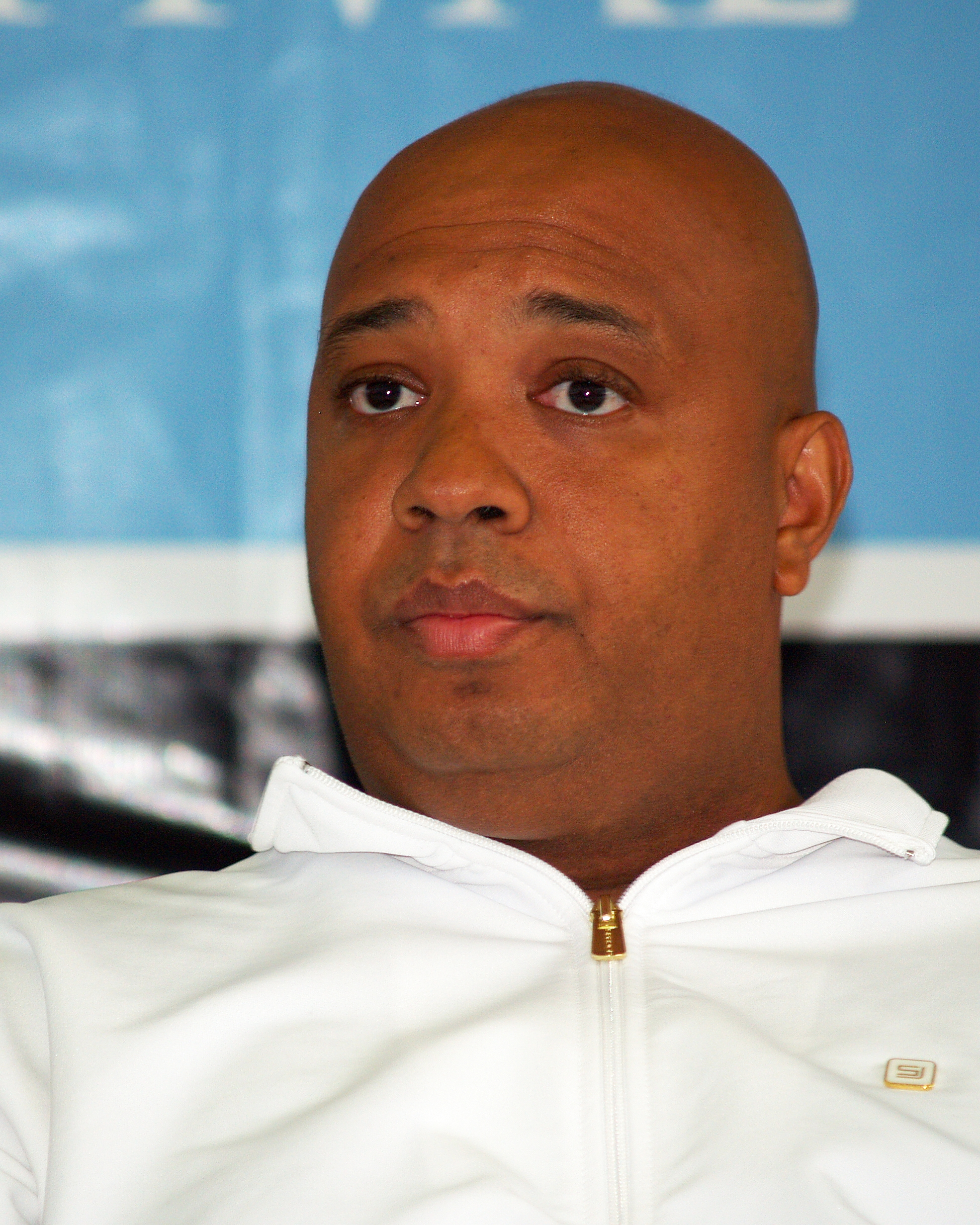
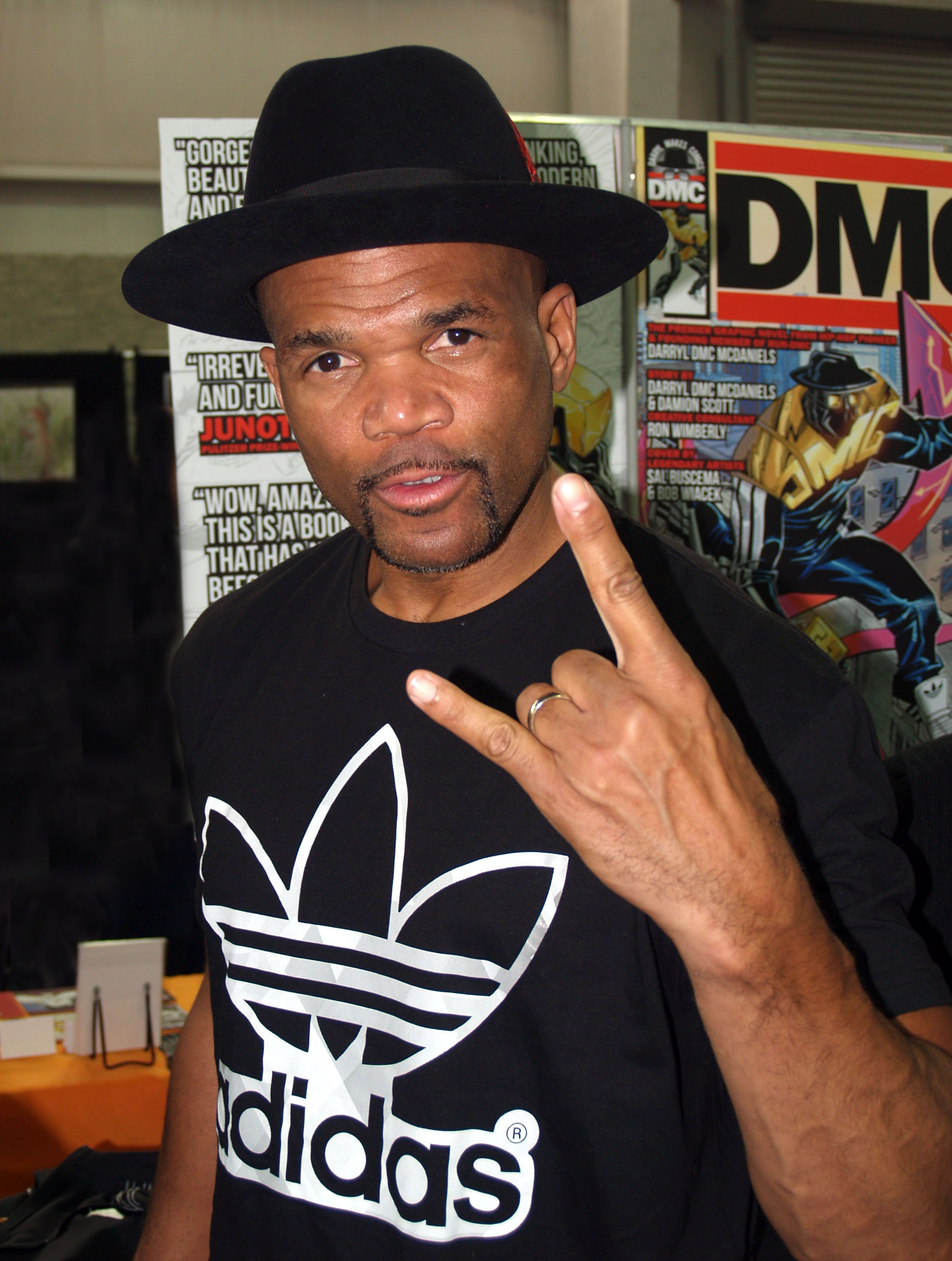
Joseph Simmons (top) and Darryl McDaniels (bottom) of Run-DMC are co-writers of "Paul Revere" from Licensed to Ill.

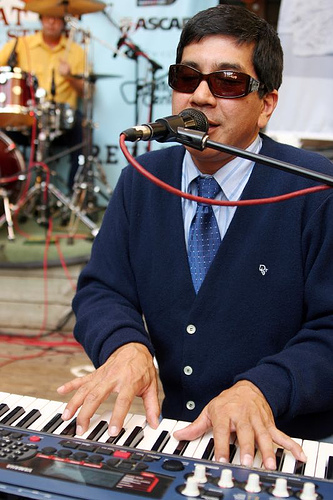
Mark Nishita a.k.a. Money Mark collaborated with Beastie Boys on all their albums from 1992 to 2011.

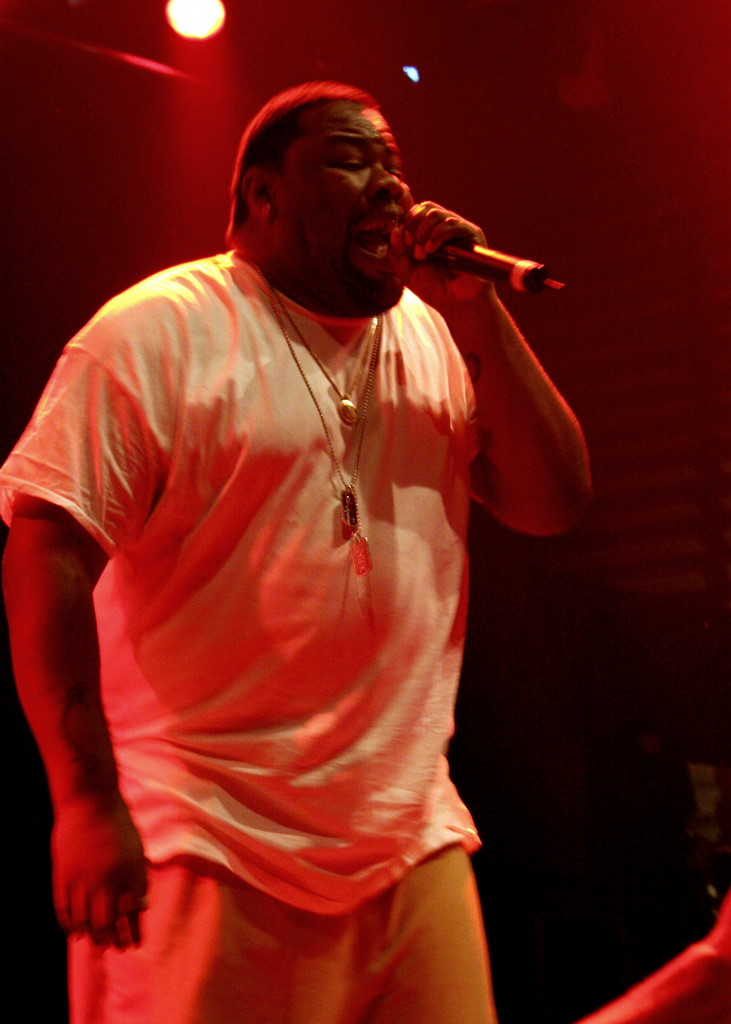
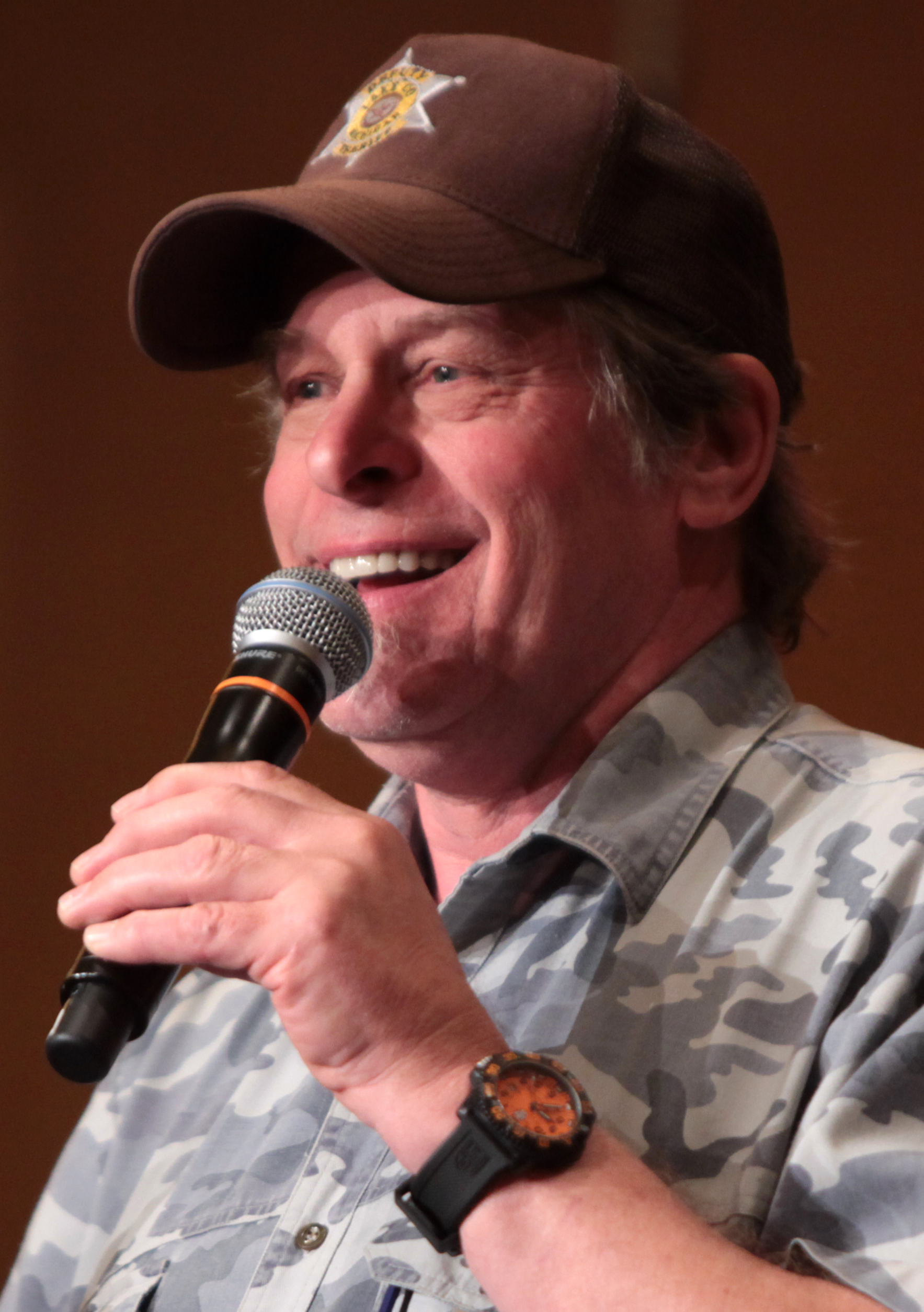
"The Biz vs. The Nuge", written by Biz Markie (top) and Ted Nugent (bottom), appeared on Check Your Head in 1992.

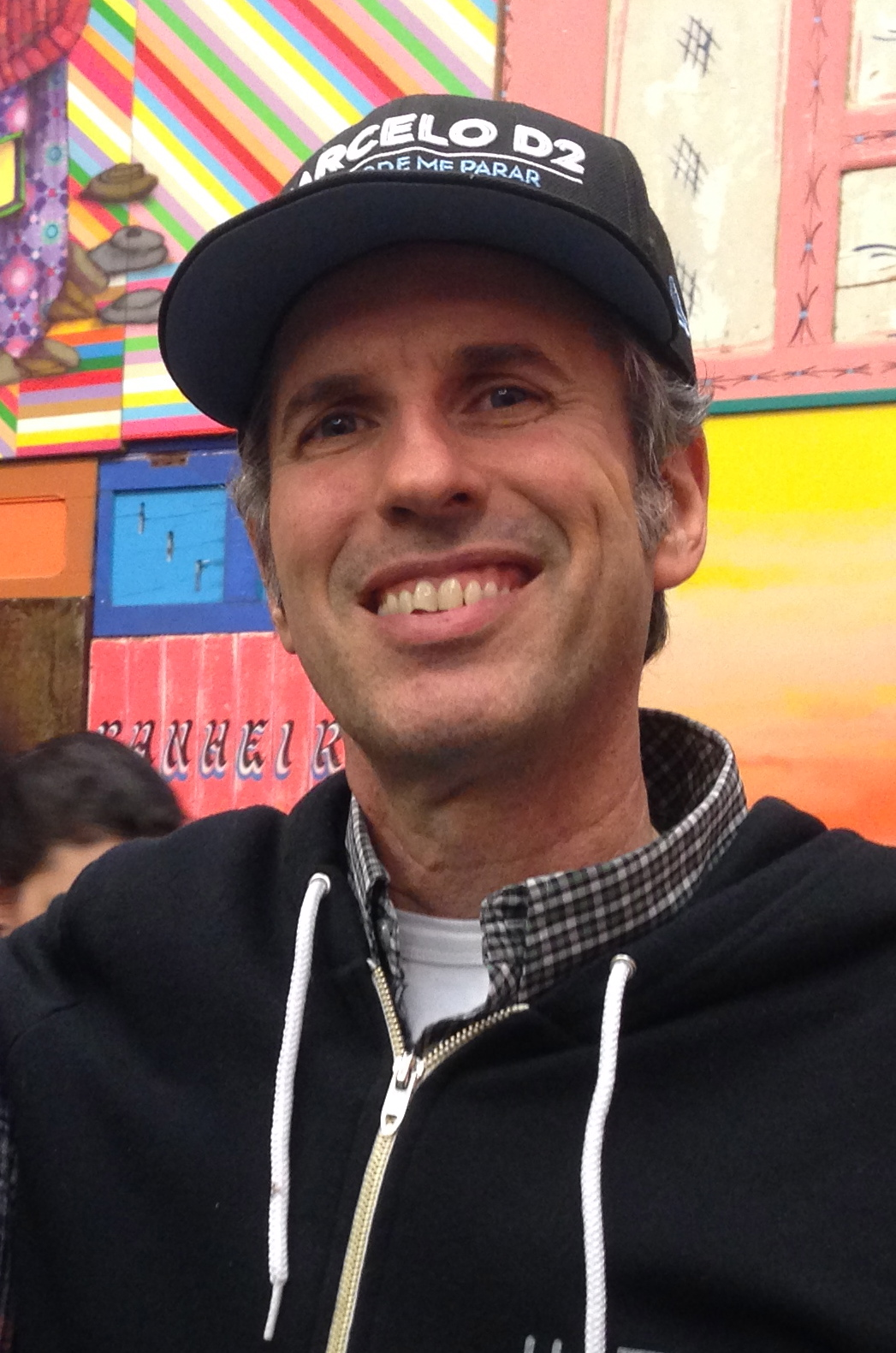
Mario Caldato Jr. co-wrote and produced many songs with Beastie Boys throughout the 1990s.

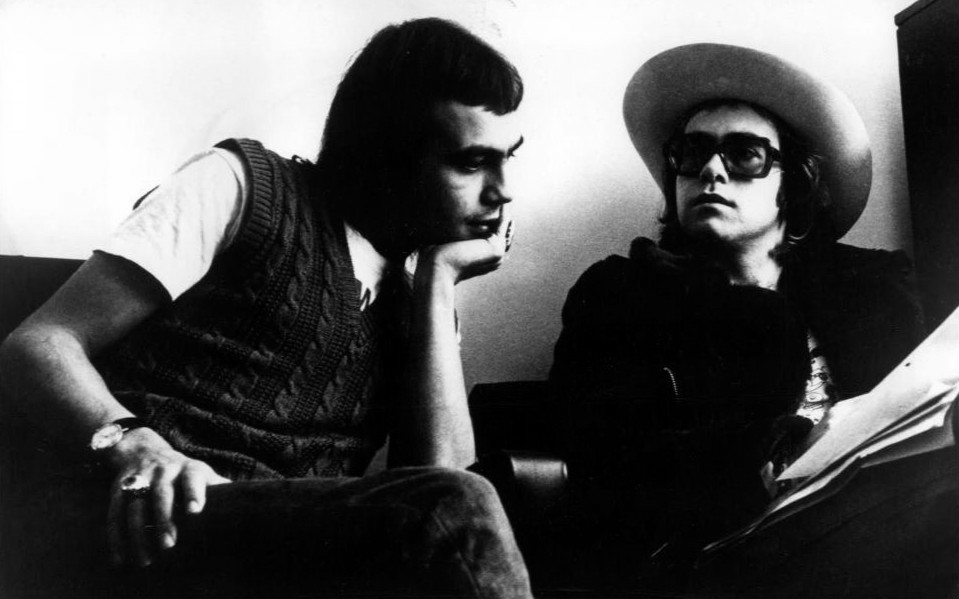
Beastie Boys' cover of "Bennie and the Jets", composed by Bernie Taupin (left) and Elton John (right), was released on Beastie Boys Anthology: The Sounds of Science.

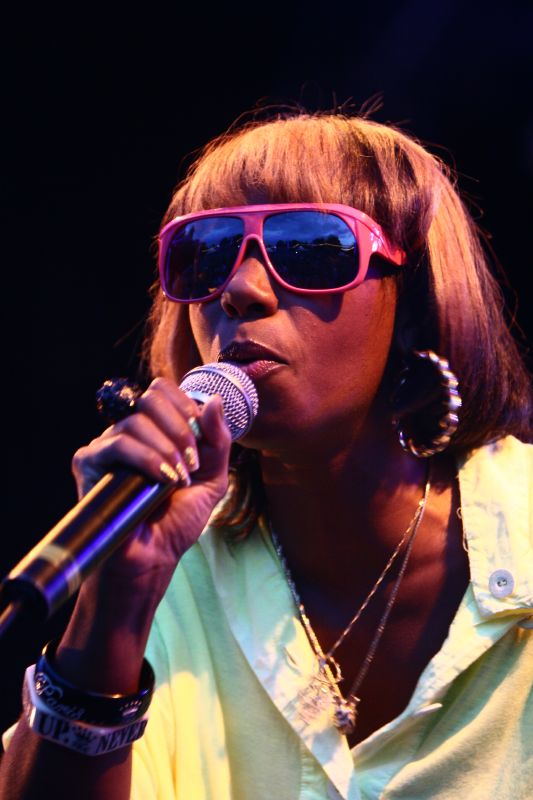
American singer Santigold is a featured artist on "Don't Play No Game That I Can't Win" from Hot Sauce Committee Part Two.

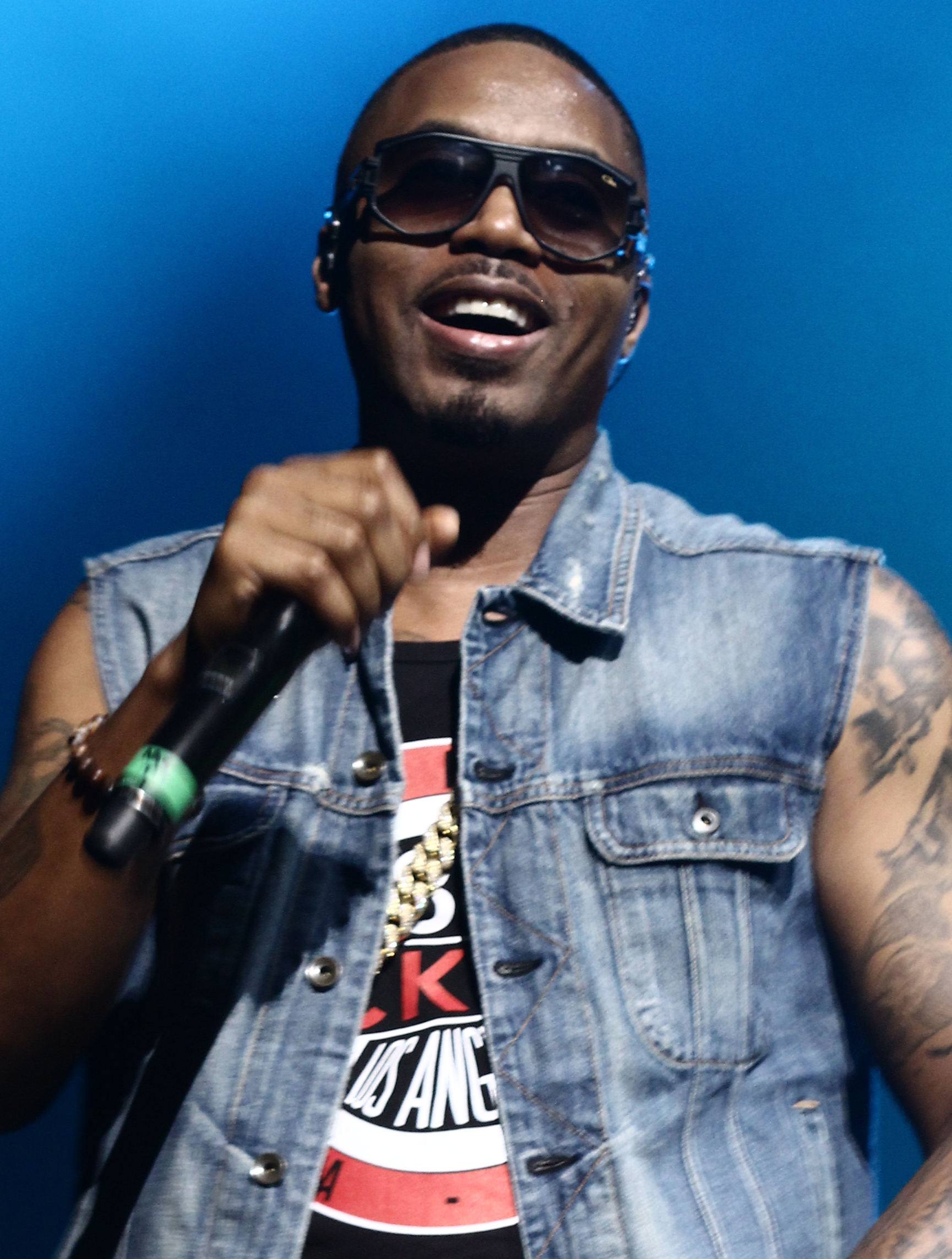
American rapper Nas is a featured artist on "Too Many Rappers" from Hot Sauce Committee Part Two.

Name of song, writers, original release, producers, and year of release
Song	Writers	Original release	Producer(s)	Year	Ref.
"14th St. Break"	Beastie Boys; Mark Nishita	The Mix-Up	Beastie Boys	2007	
"3 the Hard Way"	Beastie Boys	To the 5 Boroughs	Beastie Boys	2004	
"3-Minute Rule"	Beastie Boys; Dust Brothers	Paul's Boutique	Beastie Boys; Dust Brothers	1989	
"33% God"	Beastie Boys; Dust Brothers	Paul's Boutique (Japanese bonus track)	Beastie Boys; Dust Brothers	1989	
"5-Piece Chicken Dinner"	Beastie Boys; Dust Brothers	Paul's Boutique	Beastie Boys; Dust Brothers	1989	
"Alive" †	Beastie Boys	Beastie Boys Anthology: The Sounds of Science	Beastie Boys; Mario Caldato Jr.	1999	
"All Lifestyles"	Beastie Boys	To the 5 Boroughs	Beastie Boys	2004	
"Alright Hear This"	Beastie Boys	Ill Communication	Beastie Boys; Mario Caldato Jr.	1994	
"An Open Letter to NYC" †	Beastie Boys	To the 5 Boroughs	Beastie Boys	2004	
"And Me"	Beastie Boys	Hello Nasty	Beastie Boys; Mario Caldato Jr.	1998	
"And What You Give Is What You Get"	Beastie Boys; Dust Brothers	An Exciting Evening at Home with Shadrach, Meshach and Abednego	Beastie Boys; Dust Brothers	1989	
"Ask for Janice"	Beastie Boys; Dust Brothers	Paul's Boutique	Mario Caldato Jr.	1989	
"B for My Name"	Beastie Boys; Mark Nishita	The Mix-Up	Beastie Boys	2007	
"B-Boy Bouillabaisse" (Note: Track is split into sections: a) "59 Chrystie Street" b) "Get on the Mic" c) "Stop That Train" d) "A Year and a Day" e) "Hello Brooklyn" f) "Dropping Names" g) "Lay It on Me" h) "Mike on the Mic" i) "A.W.O.L.")	Beastie Boys; Dust Brothers	Paul's Boutique	Beastie Boys; Dust Brothers	1989	
"B-Boys Makin' with the Freak Freak"	Beastie Boys	Ill Communication	Beastie Boys; Mario Caldato Jr.	1994	
"Beasley Is a Beast"	Beastie Boys; Mark Nishita	The Mix-Up Bonus Tracks	Beastie Boys	2008	
"Beastie Boys"	Beastie Boys	Polly Wog Stew (EP)	Beastie Boys; Scott Jarvis	1982	
"Beastie Groove" †	Beastie Boys; Rick Rubin	Non-album single B-side to "Rock Hard"	Beastie Boys; Rick Rubin	1984	
"Beastie Revolution" †	Beastie Boys	Non-album single B-side to "Cooky Puss"	Beastie Boys; Dug Pomeroy	1983	
"Believe Me"	Beastie Boys; Amery "AWOL" Smith	Aglio e Olio (EP)	Beastie Boys	1995	
"Benny and the Jets"	Elton John; Bernie Taupin	Beastie Boys Anthology: The Sounds of Science	Beastie Boys; Mario Caldato Jr.	1999	
"The Bill Harper Collection"	Beastie Boys	Hot Sauce Committee Part Two	Beastie Boys	2011	
"The Biz vs. The Nuge"	Dr. Marcel Hall; Ted Nugent	Check Your Head	Beastie Boys; Mario Caldato Jr.	1992	
"The Blue Nun"	Beastie Boys	Check Your Head	Beastie Boys; Mario Caldato Jr.	1992	
"Bobo on the Corner"	Beastie Boys; Money Mark; Eric Bobo	Ill Communication	Beastie Boys; Mario Caldato Jr.	1994	
"Bodhisattva Vow"	Beastie Boys; Mario Caldato Jr.	Ill Communication	Beastie Boys; Mario Caldato Jr.	1994	
"Body Movin'" †	Beastie Boys; Mario Caldato Jr.	Hello Nasty	Beastie Boys; Mario Caldato Jr.	1998	
"Bonus Batter" †	Beastie Boys	Non-album single	Beastie Boys; Dug Pomeroy	1983	
"Boomin' Granny" †	Beastie Boys	Non-album single B-side to "Jimmy James"	Beastie Boys; Mario Caldato Jr.	1992	
"Brand New"	Beastie Boys; Amery "AWOL" Smith	Aglio e Olio (EP)	Beastie Boys	1995	
"Brass Monkey" †	Beastie Boys; Rick Rubin	Licensed to Ill	Beastie Boys; Rick Rubin	1986	
"The Brouhaha"	Beastie Boys	To the 5 Boroughs	Beastie Boys	2004	
"Car Thief"	Beastie Boys; Dust Brothers	Paul's Boutique	Beastie Boys; Dust Brothers	1989	
"Caught in the Middle of a 3-Way Mix"	Beastie Boys; Dust Brothers	An Exciting Evening at Home with Shadrach, Meshach and Abednego	Beastie Boys; Dust Brothers	1989	
"Ch-Check It Out" †	Beastie Boys	To the 5 Boroughs	Beastie Boys	2004	
"Cooky Puss" †	Beastie Boys	Non-album single	Beastie Boys; Dug Pomeroy	1983	
"The Cousin of Death"	Beastie Boys; Mark Nishita	The Mix-Up	Beastie Boys	2007	
"Crawlspace"	Beastie Boys	To the 5 Boroughs	Beastie Boys	2004	
"Crazy Ass Shit"	Beastie Boys	Hot Sauce Committee Part Two	Beastie Boys	2011	
"Deal with It"	Beastie Boys; Amery "AWOL" Smith	Aglio e Olio (EP)	Beastie Boys	1995	
"Dedication"	Beastie Boys; Money Mark	Hello Nasty	Beastie Boys; Mario Caldato Jr.	1998	
"Dis Yourself in '89 (Just Do It)"	Beastie Boys; Dust Brothers	Paul's Boutique (Japanese bonus track)	Beastie Boys; Dust Brothers	1989	
"Do It"	Beastie Boys; Money Mark; Biz Markie; Mario Caldato Jr.	Ill Communication	Beastie Boys; Mario Caldato Jr.	1994	
"Don't Play No Game That I Can't Win" (featuring Santigold) †	Beastie Boys; Santi White	Hot Sauce Committee Part Two	Beastie Boys	2011	
"Dramastically Different"	Beastie Boys; Mark Nishita	The Mix-Up	Beastie Boys	2007	
"Drinkin' Wine" †	Beastie Boys	Non-album single B-side to "Jimmy James"	Beastie Boys; Mario Caldato Jr.	1992	
"Drunken Praying Mantis Style" †	Beastie Boys; Mark Nishita	Non-album single B-side to "Pass the Mic"	Beastie Boys; Mario Caldato Jr.	1992	
"Dr. Lee, PhD"	Beastie Boys; Money Mark; Lee "Scratch" Perry	Hello Nasty	Beastie Boys; Mario Caldato Jr.	1998	
"Dub the Mic" (Instrumental) †	Beastie Boys; Mario Caldato Jr.	Non-album single B-side to "Pass the Mic"	Beastie Boys; Mario Caldato Jr.	1992	
"Egg Man"	Beastie Boys; Dust Brothers	Paul's Boutique	Beastie Boys; Dust Brothers	1989	
"Egg Raid on Mojo"	Beastie Boys	Polly Wog Stew (EP)	Beastie Boys; Scott Jarvis	1982	
"Electric Worm" †	Beastie Boys; Mark Nishita	The Mix-Up	Beastie Boys	2007	
"Electrify"	Beastie Boys; Mario Caldato Jr.	Hello Nasty	Beastie Boys; Mario Caldato Jr.	1998	
"Eugene's Lament"	Beastie Boys; Money Mark; Eric Bobo; Eugene Gore	Ill Communication	Beastie Boys; Mario Caldato Jr.	1994	
"Fibonacci Sequence"	Beastie Boys; Mark Nishita	The Mix-Up Bonus Tracks	Beastie Boys	2008	
"Fight for Your Right" †	Beastie Boys; Rick Rubin	Licensed to Ill	Beastie Boys; Rick Rubin	1986	
"Finger Lickin' Good"	Beastie Boys; Mario Caldato Jr. Wendell Fite; Tadone Hill	Check Your Head	Beastie Boys; Mario Caldato Jr.	1992	
"Flowin' Prose"	Beastie Boys	Hello Nasty	Beastie Boys; Mario Caldato Jr.	1998	
"Flute Loop"	Beastie Boys; Mario Caldato Jr.	Ill Communication	Beastie Boys; Mario Caldato Jr.	1994	
"Freaky Hijiki"	Beastie Boys; Mark Nishita	The Mix-Up	Beastie Boys	2007	
"Funky Boss"	Beastie Boys; Mark Nishita	Check Your Head	Beastie Boys; Mario Caldato Jr.	1992	
"Funky Donkey"	Beastie Boys	Hot Sauce Committee Part Two	Beastie Boys	2011	
"Futterman's Rule"	Beastie Boys; Money Mark	Ill Communication	Beastie Boys; Mario Caldato Jr.	1994	
"The Gala Event"	Beastie Boys; Mark Nishita	The Mix-Up	Beastie Boys	2007	
"Get It Together" †	Beastie Boys	Ill Communication	Beastie Boys; Mario Caldato Jr.	1994	
"Girls" †	Beastie Boys; Rick Rubin	Licensed to Ill	Beastie Boys; Rick Rubin	1986	
"The Grasshopper Unit (Keep Movin')"	Beastie Boys	Hello Nasty	Beastie Boys; Mario Caldato Jr.	1998	
"Graditude" †	Beastie Boys; Tom Cushman	Check Your Head	Beastie Boys; Mario Caldato Jr.	1992	
"Groove Holmes"	Beastie Boys; Mark Nishita	Check Your Head	Beastie Boys; Mario Caldato Jr.	1992	
"Heart Attack Man"	Beastie Boys; Amery "AWOL" Smith	Ill Communication	Beastie Boys; Mario Caldato Jr.	1994	
"Here's a Little Something for Ya"	Beastie Boys	Hot Sauce Committee Part Two	Beastie Boys	2011	
"Hey Fuck You"	Beastie Boys	To the 5 Boroughs	Beastie Boys	2004	
"Hey Ladies" †	Beastie Boys; Dust Brothers	Paul's Boutique	Beastie Boys; Dust Brothers	1989	
"High Plains Drifter"	Beastie Boys; Dust Brothers	Paul's Boutique	Beastie Boys; Dust Brothers	1989	
"Hold It Now, Hit It" †	Beastie Boys; Rick Rubin	Licensed to Ill	Beastie Boys; Rick Rubin	1986	
"Holy Snappers"	Beastie Boys	Polly Wog Stew (EP)	Beastie Boys; Scott Jarvis	1982	
"Honky Rink" †	Beastie Boys	Non-album single B-side to "Graditude"	Beastie Boys; Mario Caldato Jr.	1992	
"I Can't Think Straight"	Beastie Boys; Amery "AWOL" Smith	Aglio e Olio (EP)	Beastie Boys	1995	
"I Don't Know"	Beastie Boys	Hello Nasty	Beastie Boys; Mario Caldato Jr.	1998	
"I Want Some"	Beastie Boys; Amery "AWOL" Smith	Aglio e Olio (EP)	Beastie Boys	1995	
"I'm Down"	Lennon–McCartney	Unreleased	Rick Rubin	–	
"In 3's"	Beastie Boys; Mark Nishita	Check Your Head	Beastie Boys; Mario Caldato Jr.	1992	
"Instant Death"	Beastie Boys	Hello Nasty	Beastie Boys; Mario Caldato Jr.	1998	
"Intergalactic" †	Beastie Boys; Mario Caldato Jr.	Hello Nasty	Beastie Boys; Mario Caldato Jr.	1998	
"It Takes Time to Build"	Beastie Boys	To the 5 Boroughs	Beastie Boys	2004	
"The Jerry Lewis"	Beastie Boys	Unreleased	Matt Dike	–	
"Jimi"	Beastie Boys	Polly Wog Stew (EP)	Beastie Boys; Scott Jarvis	1982	
"Jimmy James" †	Beastie Boys; Mario Caldato Jr.	Check Your Head	Beastie Boys; Mario Caldato Jr.	1992	
"Johnny Ryall"	Beastie Boys; Dust Brothers	Paul's Boutique	Beastie Boys; Dust Brothers	1989	
"Just a Test"	Beastie Boys	Hello Nasty	Beastie Boys; Mario Caldato Jr.	1998	
"The Kangaroo Rat"	Beastie Boys; Mark Nishita	The Mix-Up	Beastie Boys	2007	
"The Larry Routine"	Beastie Boys	Hot Sauce Committee Part Two	Beastie Boys	2011	
"Lee Majors Come Again" †	Beastie Boys	Hot Sauce Committee Part Two	Beastie Boys	2011	
"Lighten Up"	Beastie Boys; Mark Nishita	Check Your Head	Beastie Boys; Mario Caldato Jr.	1992	
"The Lisa Lisa / Full Force Routine"	Beastie Boys	Hot Sauce Committee Part Two	Beastie Boys	2011	
"Live at P.J.'s"	Beastie Boys; Mark Nishita	Check Your Head	Beastie Boys; Mario Caldato Jr.	1992	
"Live Wire"	Beastie Boys	Beastie Boys Anthology: The Sounds of Science	Beastie Boys; Mario Caldato Jr.	1999	
"Long Burn the Fire"	Beastie Boys	Hot Sauce Committee Part Two	Beastie Boys	2011	
"Looking Down the Barrel of a Gun"	Beastie Boys; Dust Brothers	Paul's Boutique	Beastie Boys; Dust Brothers	1989	
"Ltd"	Beastie Boys; Mark Nishita	The Mix-Up Bonus Tracks	Beastie Boys	2008	
"The Maestro"	Beastie Boys	Check Your Head	Beastie Boys; Mario Caldato Jr.	1992	
"Make Some Noise" †	Beastie Boys	Hot Sauce Committee Part Two	Beastie Boys	2011	
"Mark on the Bus"	Mark Nishita	Check Your Head	Beastie Boys; Mario Caldato Jr.	1992	
"The Melee"	Beastie Boys; Mark Nishita	The Mix-Up	Beastie Boys	2007	
"Michelle's Farm"	Beastie Boys	Polly Wog Stew (EP)	Beastie Boys; Scott Jarvis	1982	
"The Mix-Up"	Beastie Boys; Mark Nishita	The Mix-Up Bonus Tracks	Beastie Boys	2008	
"The Move"	Beastie Boys	Hello Nasty	Beastie Boys; Mario Caldato Jr.	1998	
"Mullet Head" †	Beastie Boys	Non-album single B-side to "Sure Shot"	Beastie Boys; Mario Caldato Jr.	1994	
"Multilateral Nuclear Disarmament"	Beastie Boys	Hot Sauce Committee Part Two	Beastie Boys	2011	
"Namasté"	Beastie Boys; Mark Nishita	Check Your Head	Beastie Boys; Mario Caldato Jr.	1992	
"The Negotiation Limerick File" †	Beastie Boys; Mario Caldato Jr.	Hello Nasty	Beastie Boys; Mario Caldato Jr.	1998	
"Nervous Assistant"	Beastie Boys; Amery "AWOL" Smith	Aglio e Olio (EP)	Beastie Boys	1995	
"Netty's Girl" †	Beastie Boys; Mark Nishita	Non-album single B-side to "Pass the Mic"	Beastie Boys; Mario Caldato Jr.	1992	
"The New Style" †	Beastie Boys; Rick Rubin	Licensed to Ill	Beastie Boys; Rick Rubin	1986	
"No Sleep till Brooklyn" (Note: Kerry King of Slayer plays the guitar solo in the song".) †	Beastie Boys; Rick Rubin	Licensed to Ill	Beastie Boys; Rick Rubin	1986	
"Nonstop Disco Powerpack"	Beastie Boys	Hot Sauce Committee Part Two	Beastie Boys	2011	
"Now Get Busy" †	Beastie Boys	The Wired CD	Beastie Boys	2004	
"Ode To..."	Beastie Boys	Polly Wog Stew (EP)	Beastie Boys; Scott Jarvis	1982	
"Oh Word?"	Beastie Boys	To the 5 Boroughs	Beastie Boys	2004	
"Off the Grid" †	Beastie Boys; Mark Nishita	The Mix-Up	Beastie Boys	2007	
"OK"	Beastie Boys	Hot Sauce Committee Part Two	Beastie Boys	2011	
"The Panda Rat"	Beastie Boys; Mark Nishita	The Mix-Up Bonus Tracks	Beastie Boys	2008	
"Party's Getting Rough" †	Beastie Boys; Rick Rubin	Non-album single A-side with "Rock Hard"	Beastie Boys; Rick Rubin	1984	
"Pass the Mic" †	Beastie Boys; Mario Caldato Jr.	Check Your Head	Beastie Boys; Mario Caldato Jr.	1992	
"Paul Revere" †	Adam Horovitz; Darryl McDaniels; Rick Rubin; Joseph Simmons	Licensed to Ill	Beastie Boys; Rick Rubin	1986	
"Picture This"	Beastie Boys; Brooke Williams	Hello Nasty	Beastie Boys; Mario Caldato Jr.	1998	
"Politickin'"	Beastie Boys; Mark Nishita	The Mix-Up Bonus Tracks	Beastie Boys	2008	
"Posse in Effect"	Beastie Boys; Rick Rubin	Licensed to Ill	Beastie Boys; Rick Rubin	1986	
"POW"	Beastie Boys; Mark Nishita	Check Your Head	Beastie Boys; Mario Caldato Jr.	1992	
"Professor Booty" †	Beastie Boys; Mario Caldato Jr.	Check Your Head	Beastie Boys; Mario Caldato Jr.	1992	
"Putting Shame in Your Game"	Beastie Boys	Hello Nasty	Beastie Boys; Mario Caldato Jr.	1998	
"The Rat Cage"	Beastie Boys; Mark Nishita	The Mix-Up	Beastie Boys	2007	
"Remote Control" †	Beastie Boys	Hello Nasty	Beastie Boys; Mario Caldato Jr.	1998	
"Rhyme the Rhyme Well"	Beastie Boys	To the 5 Boroughs	Beastie Boys	2004	
"Rhymin & Stealin'"	Beastie Boys; Rick Rubin	Licensed to Ill	Beastie Boys; Rick Rubin	1986	
"Ricky's Theme"	Beastie Boys; Money Mark; Eric Bobo	Ill Communication	Beastie Boys; Mario Caldato Jr.	1994	
"Right Right Now Now" †	Beastie Boys	To the 5 Boroughs	Beastie Boys	2004	
"Riot Fight"	Beastie Boys	Polly Wog Stew (EP)	Beastie Boys; Scott Jarvis	1982	
"Rock Hard" †	Beastie Boys; Rick Rubin	Non-album single	Beastie Boys; Rick Rubin	1984	
"Root Down" †	Beastie Boys	Ill Communication	Beastie Boys; Mario Caldato Jr.	1994	
"Sabotage" †	Beastie Boys	Ill Communication	Beastie Boys; Mario Caldato Jr.	1994	
"Sabrosa"	Beastie Boys; Money Mark	Ill Communication	Beastie Boys; Mario Caldato Jr.	1994	
"Say It"	Beastie Boys	Hot Sauce Committee Part Two	Beastie Boys	2011	
"The Scoop"	Beastie Boys; Mario Caldato Jr.	Ill Communication	Beastie Boys; Mario Caldato Jr.	1994	
"Shadrach" †	Beastie Boys; Dust Brothers	Paul's Boutique	Beastie Boys; Dust Brothers	1989	
"Shake Your Rump"	Beastie Boys; Dust Brothers	Paul's Boutique	Beastie Boys; Dust Brothers	1989	
"Shambala"	Beastie Boys; Money Mark; Eric Bobo; Tibetan Organization	Ill Communication	Beastie Boys; Mario Caldato Jr.	1994	
"Shazam!"	Beastie Boys	To the 5 Boroughs	Beastie Boys	2004	
"She's Crafty"	Beastie Boys; Rick Rubin	Licensed to Ill	Beastie Boys; Rick Rubin	1986	
"She's on It" †	Adam Horovitz; Rick Rubin	Non-album single	Rick Rubin	1985	
"The Skills to Pay the Bills" †	Beastie Boys	Non-album single B-side to "So What'cha Want"	Beastie Boys; Mario Caldato Jr.	1992	
"Slow and Low" †	Darryl McDaniels; Rick Rubin; Joseph Simmons	B-side to "She's on It"; Re-released on Licensed to Ill	Beastie Boys; Rick Rubin	1985	
"Slow Ride"	Beastie Boys; Rick Rubin	Licensed to Ill	Beastie Boys; Rick Rubin	1986	
"Sneakin' Out the Hospital"	Beastie Boys	Hello Nasty	Beastie Boys; Mario Caldato Jr.	1998	
"So What'cha Want" †	Beastie Boys	Check Your Head	Beastie Boys; Mario Caldato Jr.	1992	
"Soba Violence"	Beastie Boys; Amery "AWOL" Smith	Aglio e Olio (EP; Japanese edition only)	Beastie Boys	1996	
"Some Dumb Cop Gave Me 2 Tickets Already"	Beastie Boys; Dust Brothers	An Exciting Evening at Home with Shadrach, Meshach and Abednego	Beastie Boys; Dust Brothers	1989	
"Something's Got to Give"	Beastie Boys; Mario Caldato Jr. Mark Nishita	Check Your Head	Beastie Boys; Mario Caldato Jr.	1992	
"Son of Neck Bone" †	Beastie Boys; Eric Bobo; Mark Nishita	Non-album single B-side to "Sure Shot"	Beastie Boys; Mario Caldato Jr.	1994	
"Song for Junior"	Beastie Boys; Eric Bobo; Money Mark; Jill Cunniff	Hello Nasty	Beastie Boys; Mario Caldato Jr.	1998	
"Song for the Man"	Beastie Boys	Hello Nasty	Beastie Boys; Mario Caldato Jr.	1998	
"The Sounds of Science"	Beastie Boys; Dust Brothers	Paul's Boutique	Beastie Boys; Dust Brothers	1989	
"Square Wave in Unison"	Beastie Boys; Amery "AWOL" Smith	Aglio e Olio (EP)	Beastie Boys	1995	
"Stand Together"	Beastie Boys; Mario Caldato Jr.	Check Your Head	Beastie Boys; Mario Caldato Jr.	1992	
"Suco de Tangerina"	Beastie Boys; Mark Nishita	The Mix-Up	Beastie Boys	2007	
"Super Disco Breakin'"	Beastie Boys	Hello Nasty	Beastie Boys; Mario Caldato Jr.	1998	
"Sure Shot"	Beastie Boys; DJ Hurricane; Mario Caldato Jr.	Ill Communication	Beastie Boys; Mario Caldato Jr.	1994	
"Tadlock's Glasses"	Beastie Boys	Hot Sauce Committee Part Two	Beastie Boys	2011	
"That's It That's All"	Beastie Boys	To the 5 Boroughs	Beastie Boys	2004	
"Three MC's and One DJ" †	Beastie Boys; Wendell Fite; Mike Schwartz	Hello Nasty	Beastie Boys; Mario Caldato Jr.	1998	
"Time for Livin'"	Sylvester Stewart; Frontline	Check Your Head	Beastie Boys; Mario Caldato Jr.	1992	
"Time to Get Ill"	Beastie Boys; Rick Rubin	Licensed to Ill	Beastie Boys; Rick Rubin	1986	
"To All the Girls"	Beastie Boys; Dust Brothers	Paul's Boutique	Beastie Boys; Dust Brothers	1989	
"Too Many Rappers" (New Reactionaries version; featuring Nas) †	Beastie Boys; Nasir Jones	Hot Sauce Committee Part Two	Beastie Boys	2011	
"Tough Guy"	Beastie Boys; Amery "AWOL" Smith	Ill Communication	Beastie Boys; Mario Caldato Jr.	1994	
"Transit Cop"	Beastie Boys	Polly Wog Stew (EP)	Beastie Boys; Scott Jarvis	1982	
"Transitions"	Beastie Boys; Money Mark	Ill Communication	Beastie Boys; Mario Caldato Jr.	1994	
"Triple Trouble" †	Beastie Boys	To the 5 Boroughs	Beastie Boys	2004	
"Twenty Questions"	Beastie Boys	Beastie Boys Anthology: The Sounds of Science	Beastie Boys; Mario Caldato Jr.	1999	
"Unite"	Beastie Boys	Hello Nasty	Beastie Boys; Mario Caldato Jr.	1998	
"The Update"	Beastie Boys; Mario Caldato Jr. Money Mark	Ill Communication	Beastie Boys; Mario Caldato Jr.	1994	
"The Vibes" †	Beastie Boys; Mark Nishita	Non-album single B-side to "Sure Shot"	Beastie Boys; Mario Caldato Jr.	1994	
"We Got The"	Beastie Boys	To the 5 Boroughs	Beastie Boys	2004	
"What Comes Around"	Beastie Boys; Dust Brothers	Paul's Boutique	Beastie Boys; Dust Brothers	1989	
"You Catch a Bad One"	Beastie Boys; Amery "AWOL" Smith	Aglio e Olio (EP)	Beastie Boys	1995	
"Your Sister's Def"	Andre Brown; Anthony Davis	An Exciting Evening at Home with Shadrach, Meshach and Abednego	Beastie Boys; Dust Brothers	1989	

== Bibliography ==
- Coleman, Brian (2007). Check the Technique: Liner Notes for Hip-Hop Junkies. Random House. ISBN 978-0-8129-7775-2.
- Sheffield, Rob (2017). Dreaming the Beatles: The Love Story of One Band and the Whole World. New York City: HarperCollins. ISBN 978-0-06-220765-4.
- Zwickel, Jonathan A. (2011). Beastie Boys: A Musical Biography. Santa Barbara, California: Greenwood. ISBN 978-0-31336-559-1.
