= Beastie Boys discography =

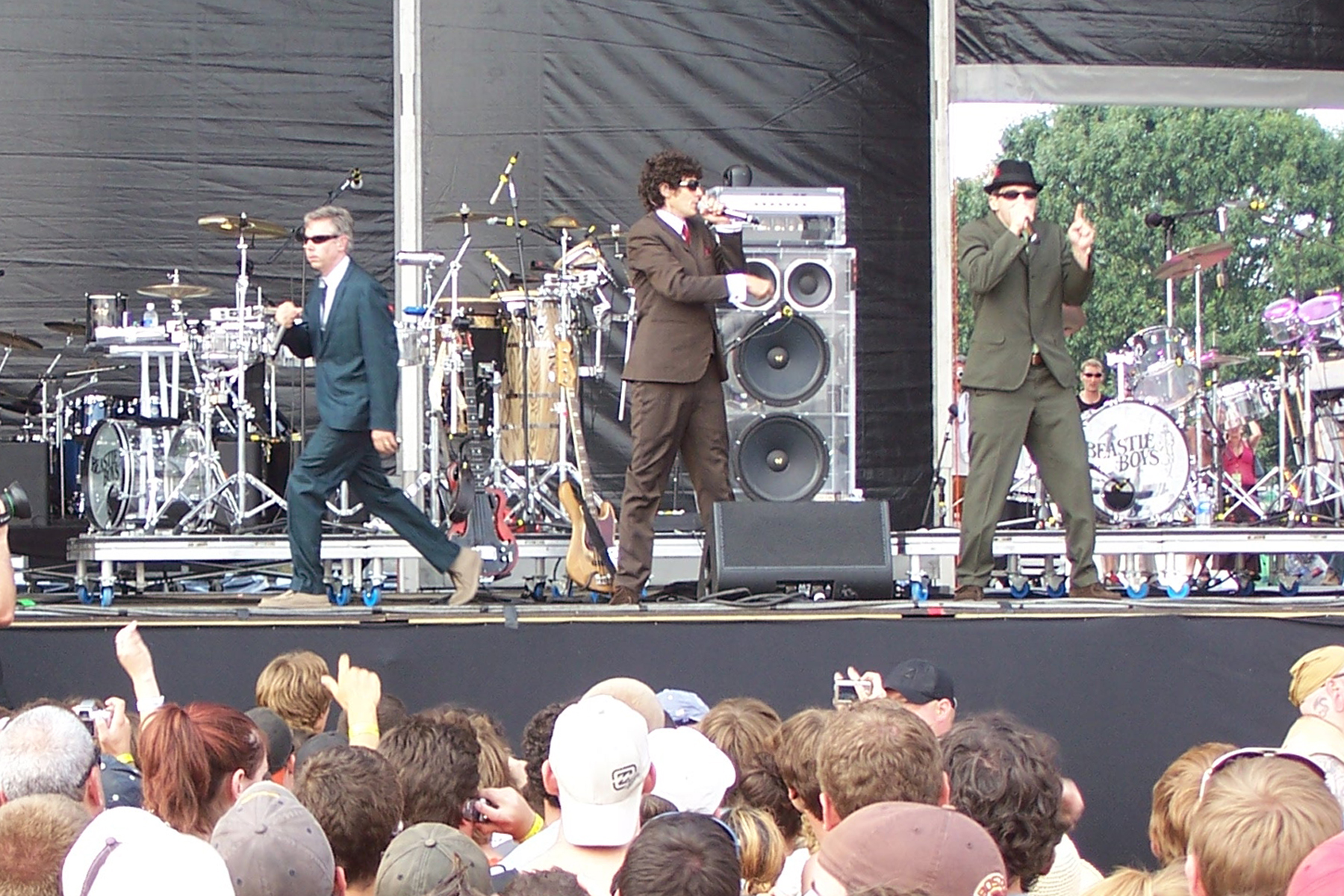
- Beastie Boys performing at the Virgin Festival in 2007
- Studio albums: 8
- Extended plays: 7
- Compilation albums: 5
- Singles: 40
- Video albums: 5
- Music videos: 44

The discography of Beastie Boys, an American hip hop group, consists of eight studio albums, four compilation albums, five video albums, seven extended plays, 40 singles and 44 music videos.

The group, formed in 1981, consisted of rappers Adam "MCA" Yauch (vocals, bass), Michael "Mike D" Diamond (vocals, drums), Adam "Ad-Rock" Horovitz (vocals, guitars), and Kate Schellenbach (drums), originally accompanied by DJ Hurricane and later accompanied by turntablist Mix Master Mike. Originally a hardcore punk group, the group's first release, Polly Wog Stew, was released in November 1982. The band made the shift into hip hop music with the single "Cooky Puss" (1983). They later signed to Def Jam Recordings, releasing "Rock Hard" in 1984. Around this time, Kate Schellenbach left the group. Since 1986, the group has released eight studio albums, four of which have topped the US Billboard 200 chart. Beastie Boys have sold 20,384,000 albums in the US as of July 2013.

== Albums ==
=== Studio albums ===
List of albums, with selected chart positions and certifications
Title	Album details	US	US R&B/HH	AUS	CAN	GER	NLD	NZ	SWE	SWI	UK	Certifications	Sales
Licensed to Ill	Released: November 15, 1986; Label: Def Jam, Columbia; Formats: CD, CS, LP, 8T	1	2	62	5	—	15	12	30	—	7	RIAA: Diamond (10× Platinum); BPI: Gold; MC: 2× Platinum	10,507,000
Paul's Boutique	Released: July 25, 1989; Label: Capitol; Formats: CD, CS, LP	14	24	65	30	—	30	50	38	—	44	RIAA: 2× Platinum; BPI: Gold; MC: Platinum	2,160,000
Check Your Head	Released: April 21, 1992; Label: Capitol; Formats: CD, CS, LP, MD	10	37	74	32	—	—	37	—	—	106	RIAA: 2× Platinum; BPI: Silver; MC: 2× Platinum	2,260,000
Ill Communication	Released: May 23, 1994; Label: Capitol; Formats: CD, CS, LP	1	2	8	4	11	31	6	7	12	10	RIAA: 3× Platinum; BPI: Gold; MC: 3× Platinum	3,500,000
Hello Nasty	Released: July 6, 1998; Label: Capitol; Formats: CD, CS, LP, digital download	1	—	1	2	1	2	1	2	1	1	RIAA: 3× Platinum; ARIA: Platinum; BPI: Platinum; IFPI SWE: Gold; IFPI SWI: Gold; MC: 3× Platinum; RIANZ: Platinum	4,928,000
To the 5 Boroughs	Released: June 15, 2004; Label: Capitol; Formats: CD, LP, CS, digital download	1	1	2	1	3	14	4	20	5	2	RIAA: Platinum; ARIA: Gold; BPI: Gold; MC: Platinum	1,344,844
The Mix-Up	Released: June 26, 2007; Label: Capitol; Formats: CD, LP, digital download	15	—	42	—	—	84	—	—	25	79		
Hot Sauce Committee Part Two	Released: May 3, 2011; Label: Capitol; Formats: CD, LP, digital download	2	1	7	3	3	6	17	—	3	9		
"—" denotes releases that did not chart or were not released in that territory.

=== Compilation albums ===
List of albums, with selected chart positions and certifications
Title	Album details	US	US R&B/HH	AUS	CAN	GER	NLD	NZ	SWE	SWI	UK	Certifications	Sales
Some Old Bullshit	Released: February 8, 1994; Label: Capitol; Formats: CD, CS, LP	46	—	91	43	—	—	—	—	—	—		
The In Sound from Way Out!	Released: April 2, 1996; Label: Capitol; Formats: CD, CS, LP	45	—	—	—	—	—	—	—	—	45	BPI: Silver	60,000
Beastie Boys Anthology: The Sounds of Science	Released: November 23, 1999; Label: Grand Royal; Formats: CD, LP, digital download	19	14	14	18	50	62	4	8	72	36	RIAA: 2× Platinum; ARIA: Gold; BPI: Gold; MC: 2× Platinum	2,450,000
Solid Gold Hits	Released: November 8, 2005; Label: Capitol; Formats: CD, LP, digital download	42	30	63	48	—	—	27	—	83	71	RIAA: Gold; BPI: Gold	591,000
Beastie Boys Music	Released: October 23, 2020; Label: UMe; Formats: CD, digital, LP	64	34	—	—	—	—	—	—	—	—		
"—" denotes releases that did not chart or were not released in that territory.

=== Video albums ===
List of video albums, with selected chart positions and certifications
Title	Album details	Peak chart positions		Certifications
Title	Album details	US Video	SWE	Certifications
Beastie Boys	Released: 1987; Label: CBS; Formats: LD, VHS	5	35	RIAA: Gold
The Skills to Pay the Bills	Released: June 2, 1992; Label: Capitol; Formats: LD, VHS	4	—	RIAA: Gold
Sabotage	Released: September 20, 1994; Label: Capitol; Formats: LD, VHS, DVD, VCD	3	—	BPI: Gold
Beastie Boys Video Anthology	Released: October 10, 2000; Label: Capitol, The Criterion Collection; Formats: DVD	4	—	RIAA: Gold
Awesome; I Fuckin' Shot That!	Released: July 25, 2006; Label: Velocity, Thinkfilm, Lions Gate; Formats: DVD	—	—	
"—" denotes releases that did not chart or were not released in that territory.

== Extended plays ==
List of extended plays, with selected chart positions and certifications
Title	EP details	US	AUS	AUT	CAN	GER	NLD	NZ	UK	Certifications	Sales
Polly Wog Stew	Released: November 20, 1982; Label: Rat Cage; Formats: CS, 7", 12"	—	—	—	—	—	—	—	—		
An Exciting Evening at Home with Shadrach, Meshach and Abednego	Released: 1989; Label: Capitol; Formats: 12"	—	—	—	—	—	—	—	—		
Frozen Metal Head	Released: 1992; Label: Capitol, Grand Royal; Formats: 12"; Notes: Special Limited Edition, White Vinyl	—	—	—	—	—	—	—	—		
Pretzel Nugget	Released: 1994; Label: Capitol; Formats: CD	—	—	—	—	—	—	—	—		
Root Down	Released: May 23, 1995; Label: Capitol; Formats: CD, CS, 7", 12"	50	43	38	48	38	78	10	23	MC: Gold	50,000
Aglio e Olio	Released: November 13, 1995; Label: Grand Royal; Formats: CD, 12"	118	—	—	—	—	—	—	—		
Nasty Bits	Released: 1998; Label: Capitol; Formats: CD	—	—	—	—	—	—	—	—		
Scientists of Sound (The Blow Up Factor Vol. 1)	Released: August 24, 1999; Label: Capitol, Grand Royal; Formats: 12"	—	—	—	—	—	—	—	—		
The Mix-Up Bonus Tracks	Released: December 23, 2008; Label: Capitol; Formats: Digital download	—	—	—	—	—	—	—	—		
"—" denotes releases that did not chart or were not released in that territory.

== Singles ==
=== As lead artist ===
List of singles, with selected chart positions and certifications, showing year released and album name
Title	Year	Peak chart positions											Certifications	Album
Title	Year	US	US Alt.	US R&B/HH	AUS	CAN	GER	NLD	NZ	SWE	SWI	UK	Certifications	Album
"Cooky Puss"	1983	—	—	—	—	—	—	—	—	—	—	—		Non-album singles
"Rock Hard"	1984	—	—	—	—	—	—	—	—	—	—	—		Non-album singles
"She's on It"	1985	—	—	—	—	—	44	23	—	—	—	10		Krush Groove (soundtrack)
"Slow and Low"	1985	—	—	—	—	—	—	—	—	—	—	—		Licensed to Ill
"Hold It Now, Hit It"	1986	—	—	55	—	—	—	—	—	—	—	—		Licensed to Ill
"The New Style"	1986	—	—	22	—	—	—	—	—	—	—	—		Licensed to Ill
"Paul Revere"	1986	—	—	34	—	—	—	—	—	—	—	—		Licensed to Ill
"Brass Monkey"	1987	48	—	83	—	—	—	—	—	—	—	—	RIAA: Gold	Licensed to Ill
"(You Gotta) Fight for Your Right (To Party!)"	1987	7	—	—	37	7	25	10	17	—	—	11	BPI: Gold	Licensed to Ill
"No Sleep till Brooklyn"	1987	—	—	—	—	—	46	23	—	—	—	14	BPI: Silver	Licensed to Ill
"Girls"^{[A]}	1987	—	—	—	—	—	—	—	27	—	—	34		Licensed to Ill
"Hey Ladies"^{[B]}	1989	36	18	—	141	—	43	31	37	—	—	76		Paul's Boutique
"Shadrach"^{[C]}	1989	—	—	—	—	—	—	—	—	—	—	—		Paul's Boutique
"Pass the Mic"	1992	—	—	—	199	—	—	—	—	—	—	47		Check Your Head
"So What'cha Want"	1992	93	22	—^{[D]}	64	—	—	—	—	—	—	—		Check Your Head
"Jimmy James"^{[E]}	1992	—	—	—	—	—	—	—	—	—	—	55		Check Your Head
"Gratitude"	1992	—	—	—	—	—	—	—	—	—	—	—		Check Your Head
"Professor Booty"	1992	—	—	—	—	—	—	—	—	—	—	—		Check Your Head
"Something's Got to Give"	1992	—	—	—	—	—	—	—	—	—	—	—		Check Your Head
"Sabotage"^{[G]}	1994	—^{[F]}	18	—	94	38	—	35	—	—	—	19	BPI: Platinum	Ill Communication
"Get It Together"^{[G]}	1994	—^{[H]}	—	—^{[H]}	94	—	—	35	—	—	—	19		Ill Communication
"Sure Shot"	1994	—	—	—	129	—	—	—	—	—	—	27		Ill Communication
"Root Down"	1995	—	—	—	—	—	—	—	—	—	—	—		Ill Communication
"Intergalactic"	1998	28	4	—	21	9	40	16	4	9	33	5	BPI: Gold; IFPI SWE: Platinum	Hello Nasty
"Body Movin'"	1998	—	15	—	28	—	—	82	20	30	—	15		Hello Nasty
"The Negotiation Limerick File"	1998	—	29	—	111	—	—	—	—	—	—	—		Hello Nasty
"Remote Control" / "Three MC's and One DJ"	1999	—	—	—	—	—	—	—	—	—	—	21		Hello Nasty
"Alive"	1999	—	11	—	—	—	—	—	22	—	—	28		Beastie Boys Anthology: The Sounds of Science
"Ch-Check It Out"	2004	68	1	—^{[I]}	46	1	65	21	31	38	36	8	RIAA: Gold	To the 5 Boroughs
"Triple Trouble"	2004	—	11	—	73	—	—	—	—	—	—	37		To the 5 Boroughs
"Right Right Now Now"	2004	—	25	—	—	—	—	—	—	—	—	—		To the 5 Boroughs
"Now Get Busy"	2004	—	—	—	—	—	—	—	—	—	—	—		The Wired CD
"An Open Letter to NYC"	2004	—	—	—	—	—	—	17	—	—	—	38		To the 5 Boroughs
"Electric Worm"	2007	—	—	—	—	—	—	—	—	—	—	—		The Mix-Up
"Off the Grid"	2007	—	—	—	—	—	—	—	—	—	—	—		The Mix-Up
"Lee Majors Come Again"	2009	—	—	—	—	—	—	—	—	—	—	—		Hot Sauce Committee Part Two
"Too Many Rappers" (featuring Nas)	2009	93	—	—	—	70	—	—	—	—	—	134		Hot Sauce Committee Part Two
"Make Some Noise"	2011	—^{[J]}	7	—	128	76	—	87	—	—	—	—		Hot Sauce Committee Part Two
"Don't Play No Game That I Can't Win" (featuring Santigold)	2011	—	—	80	—	—	—	—	—	—	—	—		Hot Sauce Committee Part Two
"—" denotes releases that did not chart or were not released in that territory.

=== Featured ===
List of singles and songs, showing year released and album name
Title	Year	Album
"Stick 'Em Up" (Hurricane featuring Beastie Boys)	1993	CB4 (soundtrack) / Hurra
"Spam” Milk featuring Ad Rock (drum programming by Mike D.)	1994	Never Dated
"The Knock (Drums of Death Part 2)" Unkle featuring Mike D	1995	Psyence Fiction
"Metaphysical" Handsome Boy Modeling School featuring Mike D and Miho Hatori	1999	So... How's Your Girl?
"Kickin' Wicked Rhymes" DJ Hurricane featuring Ad Rock and Black Thought	2000	Don't Sleep
"Squat!" De La Soul featuring Mike D & Ad-Rock)	2000	Art Official Intelligence: Mosaic Thump
"EAT INtro"; "Shout Out for Delivery"; "Beef or Chicken!?"; "Take OUTro" Teriyaki Boyz (produced by Ad Rock}	2005	Beef or Chicken?
"Can't Bake that Fape" Teriyaki Boyz featuring Ad Rock	2009	Serious Japanese
"That's What I Said (The NYC Remix By Adrock And Mike D)"	2009	—N/a
"Love Parade"; "Action" Cassius featuring Mike D	2016	Ibifornia
"Consume or Be Consumed" The Slaves featuring Mike D (Whole album produced by Mike D)	2016	Take Control
"Public Enemy Number Won " Public Enemy featuring Mike D, Ad-Rock and Run-DMC	2020	What You Gonna Do When the Grid Goes Down?

== Music videos ==
=== As lead artist ===
List of music videos, showing year released and director
Year	Album	Title	Director(s)
1981	Some Old Bullshit	"Holy Snappers"	Nathanial Hörnblowér
1982	Some Old Bullshit	"Egg Raid on Mojo"	Philip Pucci
1985	She's on It	"She's on It"	Sean Travis
1986	Licensed to Ill	"Hold It, Now Hit It"	Peter Dyer Dougherty
1986	Licensed to Ill	"(You Gotta) Fight for Your Right (To Party!)"	Adam Dubin, Ric Menello
1987	Licensed to Ill	"No Sleep till Brooklyn"	Adam Dubin, Ric Menello
1987	Licensed to Ill	"Rhymin & Stealin"	Peter Dyer Dougherty
1987	Licensed to Ill	"She's Crafty"	Peter Dyer Dougherty
1989	Paul's Boutique	"Hey Ladies"	Adam Bernstein
1989	Paul's Boutique	"Looking Down the Barrel of a Gun"	Nathanial Hörnblowér
1989	Paul's Boutique	"Shake Your Rump"	Nathanial Hörnblowér
1989	Paul's Boutique	"Shadrach"	Nathanial Hörnblowér
1989	Paul's Boutique	"Ask for Janice, Part II"	Nathanial Hörnblowér
1989	Licensed to Ill	"Slow and Low" (live)	Nathanial Hörnblowér
1992	Check Your Head	"Netty's Girl"	Tamra Davis
1992	Check Your Head	"Pass the Mic"	Nathanial Hörnblowér
1992	Check Your Head	"So What'cha Want"	Nathanial Hörnblowér
1992	Check Your Head	"So What'cha Want" (Remix)	David Perez Shadi
1992	Check Your Head	"Jimmy James"	Nathanial Hörnblowér, Lisa Ann Cabasa
1992	Check Your Head	"Time for Livin'"	Spike Jonze
1993	Check Your Head	"Gratitude"	David Perez Shadi
1993	Check Your Head	"Something's Got to Give"	Ari Marcopoulos
1994	Ill Communication	"Sabotage"	Spike Jonze
1994	Ill Communication	"Ricky's Theme"	Spike Jonze
1994	Ill Communication	"Sure Shot"	Spike Jonze, Nathanial Hörnblowér
1995	Ill Communication	"Root Down"	Evan Bernard
1995	Ill Communication	"Root Down" (live)	Spike Jonze
1998	Hello Nasty	"Intergalactic"	Nathanial Hörnblowér
1998	Hello Nasty	"Body Movin'"	Nathanial Hörnblowér
1999	Hello Nasty	"Three MC's and One DJ"	Nathanial Hörnblowér
1999	The Sounds of Science	"Alive"	Nathanial Hörnblowér
1999	Alive 12"	"Start!" (featuring Miho Hatori)	Nathanial Hörnblowér
2004	To the 5 Boroughs	"Ch-Check It Out"	Nathanial Hörnblowér
2004	To the 5 Boroughs	"Triple Trouble"	Nathanial Hörnblowér
2004	To the 5 Boroughs	"Right Right Now Now"	Nathanial Hörnblowér
2004	To the 5 Boroughs	"Rhyme the Rhyme Well"	Nathanial Hörnblowér
2004	To the 5 Boroughs	"An Open Letter to NYC"	Nathanial Hörnblowér
2005	Solid Gold Hits	"Brass Monkey" (live)	Nathanial Hörnblowér
2007	To The 5 Boroughs	"Shazam!"	Nathanial Hörnblowér
2007	The Mix-Up	"Off the Grid"	Nathanial Hörnblowér
2007	The Mix-Up	"The Gala Event"	—N/a
2007	The Mix-Up	"The Rat Cage"	—N/a
2007	The Mix-Up	"Suco De Tangerina"	—N/a
2011	Hot Sauce Committee Part Two	"Make Some Noise"	Nathanial Hörnblowér
2011	Hot Sauce Committee Part Two	"Don't Play No Game That I Can't Win" (featuring Santigold)	Spike Jonze
2015	Hot Sauce Committee Part Two	"Too Many Rappers" (featuring Nas)	Roman Coppola
2024	Ill Communication	"Futterman's Rule"	Spike Jonze

=== As featured artist ===
List of music videos, showing year released and director
Title	Year	Director(s)
"Stick 'Em Up" (Hurricane featuring Beastie Boys)	1993	—N/a

== Notes ==
- A "Girls" was released as a double A-side single with "She's Crafty" in the United Kingdom.
- B An EP entitled Love American Style, containing a track listing similar to that of the "Hey Ladies" single, was released in several territories in place of the single. The UK peak chart position listed for "Hey Ladies" represents the peak chart position of Love American Style.
- C "Shadrach" was alternately released as a single under the name "An Exciting Evening at Home with Shadrach, Meshach and Abednego".
- D "So What'cha Want" did not enter the R&B/Hip-Hop Songs chart, but peaked at number 21 on the Bubbling Under R&B/Hip-Hop Singles chart, which acts as an extension to the R&B/Hip-Hop Songs chart.
- E An EP entitled Frozen Metal Head, containing a track listing similar to that of the "Jimmy James" single, was released in several territories in place of the single. The UK peak chart position listed for "Jimmy James" represents the peak chart position of Frozen Metal Head.
- F "Sabotage" did not enter the Billboard Hot 100, but peaked at number 15 on the Bubbling Under Hot 100 Singles chart, which acts as an extension to the Hot 100.
- G "Sabotage" and "Get It Together" were released together as a double A-side single in several European territories.
- H "Get It Together" did not enter the Billboard Hot 100, but peaked at number 1 on the Bubbling Under Hot 100 Singles chart, which acts as an extension to the Hot 100. It did not enter the R&B/Hip-Hop Songs chart, but peaked at number 6 on the Bubbling Under R&B/Hip-Hop Singles chart, which acts as an extension to the R&B/Hip-Hop Songs chart.
- I "Ch-Check It Out" did not enter the R&B/Hip-Hop Songs chart, but peaked at number 6 on the Bubbling Under R&B/Hip-Hop Singles chart, which acts as an extension to the R&B/Hip-Hop Songs chart.
- J "Make Some Noise" did not enter the Billboard Hot 100, but peaked at number 2 on the Bubbling Under Hot 100 Singles chart, which acts as an extension to the Hot 100.
