= The In Sound from Way Out! =

The In Sound from Way Out! may refer to:

- The In Sound from Way Out! (Perrey and Kingsley album), 1966
- The In Sound from Way Out! (Beastie Boys album), 1996
