= Thank You (Mike D album) =

Studio album by Mike D
- Released: August 28, 2026
- Length: 39:16
- Label: Capitol
- Producers: Davis Diamond; Skyler Diamond; Tyran Donaldson; Ging; Carter Lang; Mike D; Dylan Neustadter; Eddie Rushca; Jared Solomon

Singles from Thank You
- 1. "Switch Up" Released: May 8, 2026; 2. "What We Got" Released: May 22, 2026; 3. "True Colors" Released: June 8, 2026; 4. "Crypto" Released: July 17, 2026

Thank You is the debut solo studio album by the American rapper Mike D. It was released on August 28, 2026, through Capitol Records. The album is preceded by four singles: "Switch Up", "What We Got", "True Colors", and "Crypto".

== Background ==
Mike D first returned to performing music in 2026 in a surprise appearance at a Very Nice Person show, a band led by his two sons Skyler and Davis Diamond. He then started performing on his own at festivals, clubs, and underground venues with his backing band 5D, which includes his sons as well as musicians that Mike D met through his sons' involvement in the LA music scene. The other three members of 5D are Eddie Ruscha and Milo Ruscha (who are father and son, but unrelated to the Diamond family), as well as Will Graefe. Throughout his performances, he released his first solo single, "Switch Up", on May 8, 2026. He released a second single from the album, "What We Got", on May 22. On June 8, the album was announced alongside a third single, "True Colors". He is scheduled to embark on the Mike D 5D Tour in support of the album, beginning on August 30, 2026 in Boston and concluding on November 5, 2026 in Brussels.

It is the first solo studio album released by a Beastie Boys member since Adam Yauch's death in 2012 and the group's subsequent dissolution.

== Critical reception ==
Professional ratings
Aggregate scores
Source	Rating
Any Decent Music	7.1/10
Metacritic	71/100
Review scores
Source	Rating
AllMusic	3.5/5 stars
Clash	7/10
The Line of Best Fit	8/10
Kerrang!	4/5 stars
Mojo	4/5 stars
NME	4/5 stars
Pitchfork	5.1/10
Record Collector	3/5 stars
Rolling Stone	3.5/5 stars
Uncut	6/10

Any Decent Music gave the album a weighted average score of 7.1 out of 10 from thirteen critic scores. According to Metacritic, it received "generally favorable" reviews based on a weighted average score of 71 out of 100 from thirteen critic scores.

== Track listing ==
Thank You track listing
No.	Title	Writer(s)	Producer(s)	Length
1.	"Switch Up"	Michael Diamond; Davis Diamond; Skyler Diamond; Carter Lang; Benjamin Pacheco; Eddie Rushca; Jared Solomon; Christopher Stracey	D. Diamond; S. Diamond; Lang; Mike D^{[a]}; Tyran Donaldson^{[a]}	3:35
2.	"What We Got"	M. Diamond; D. Diamond; S. Diamond; Tyran Donaldson; Knox Fortune; Jason Lader; Lang; Pacheco	Donaldson; Lang; D. Diamond^{[c]}; S. Diamond^{[c]}	2:54
3.	"True Colors"	M. Diamond; S. Diamond; Lang; Dylan Neustadter; Solomon	Mike D; Donaldson^{[c]}; Lang^{[c]}; Neustadter^{[c]}; D. Diamond^{[a]}; S. Diamond^{[a]}; Solomon^{[a]}	3:39
4.	"That's Right"	M. Diamond; D. Diamond; S. Diamond; Adam Feeney; Lader; Neustadter	D. Diamond; Ging; S. Diamond^{[c]}; Lader^{[c]}; Neustadter^{[c]}	2:08
5.	"Secrets Pt. I"	M. Diamond; D. Diamond; Donaldson; Lang; Rushca	Mike D; Lang; D. Diamond^{[c]}; S. Diamond^{[c]}; Donaldson^{[c]}; Neustadter^{[a]}	1:24
6.	"Secrets Pt. II"	M. Diamond; D. Diamond; Donaldson; Lang; Rushca	Mike D; Lang; D. Diamond^{[c]}; S. Diamond^{[c]}; Donaldson^{[c]}; Neustadter^{[a]}	3:27
7.	"I Don't Care"	M. Diamond; Hubert Blanc-Francard; D. Diamond; S. Diamond; Hubert Blanc-Francard; Will Graefe; Jeremy Gustin	D. Diamond; Lang; Mike D^{[c]}; S. Diamond^{[c]}; Donaldson^{[c]}; Neustadter^{[c]}	3:16
8.	"Make It Stop"	M. Diamond; Blanc-Francard; D. Diamond; Lang; Neustadter	Mike D; Lang; D. Diamond^{[c]}; S. Diamond^{[c]}; Donaldson^{[c]}; Neustadter^{[c]}	2:55
9.	"Crypto"	M. Diamond; D. Diamond; S. Diamond; Donaldson; Feeney	Ging; Donaldson^{[c]}; Lang^{[c]}; Neustadter^{[c]}; D. Diamond^{[a]}; S. Diamond^{[a]}	2:40
10.	"Here We Are"	M. Diamond; D. Diamond; S. Diamond; Donaldson; Lang; Neustadter; Solomon; Stracey	Donaldson; Lang; Solomon; D. Diamond^{[c]}; S. Diamond^{[c]}; Neustadter^{[c]}	3:45
11.	"Back to Start"	M. Diamond; D. Diamond; S. Diamond; Graefe; Lader; Neustadter; Aaron Paris	Mike D; Lang; Neustadter; D. Diamond^{[c]}; S. Diamond^{[c]}; Donaldson^{[c]}	3:08
12.	"It's Time"	M. Diamond; S. Diamond; Feeney; Rushca	Lang; Ruschha; D. Diamond^{[c]}; S. Diamond^{[c]}; Donaldson^{[c]}; Ging^{[c]}	2:49
13.	"Thank You"	M. Diamond; D. Diamond; S. Diamond; Donaldson; Graefe; Lang; Neustadter	Mike D; Donaldson; D. Diamond^{[c]}; S. Diamond^{[c]}; Neustadter^{[c]}	3:36
Total length:				39:16

=== Notes ===
- ^{^[c]} signifies a co-producer
- ^{^[a]} signifies an additional producer

== Personnel ==
Credits are adapted from Tidal.

- Michael Diamond – vocals (all tracks), drums (tracks 2, 3, 9, 11, 12); bass synthesizer, drum machine (3); organ (5, 6), synthesizer (8, 10), programming (8)
- Gregg White – engineering
- Derek "MixedByAli" Ali – mixing
- Nicolas De Porcel – mastering
- Carter Lang – bass (1–3, 9, 10), drums (1, 5, 6), guitar (3, 5, 6, 9), organ (3), synthesizer (8, 9), programming (8, 10)
- Benjamin Pacheco – drums, synthesizer (1); bass, guitar (2)
- Jared Solomon – guitar (1, 3, 10), bass (13)
- Skyler Diamond – synthesizer (1), programming (4, 9, 10, 12)
- Eddie Rushca – guitar (1), synthesizer (5, 6), programming (12)
- Aaron Paris – strings arrangement (1), strings (7, 11)
- Christopher Stracey – drums (1); guitar, synthesizer (10)
- Jason Lader – drum machine (2), programming (4)
- Tyran Donaldson – drum programming, guitar, organ (2); synthesizer (5, 6), programming (8, 10, 13)
- Benny Bock – keyboards (2), guitar (12)
- Knox Fortune – background vocals, keyboards (2)
- Dylan Neustadter – guitar (3, 10, 11), background vocals (5, 6, 10, 11), synthesizer (13)
- Davis Diamond – programming (4), background vocals (5, 6, 10, 11)
- Adam Feeney – programming (4, 9, 12), guitar (9)
- Hubert Blanc-Francard – synthesizer (7, 8)
- Will Graefe – bass (7, 13), guitar (11, 13)
- Jeremy Gustin – drums (7)
- CJ Camerieri – horn (7)

== Charts ==
Chart performance for Thank You
Chart (2026)	Peak position
Belgian Albums (Ultratop Flanders)	55
Belgian Albums (Ultratop Wallonia)	33
French Physical Albums (SNEP)	50
German Albums (Offizielle Top 100)	26
German Rock & Metal Albums (Offizielle Top 100)	11
Scottish Albums (Official Charts)	4
Swiss Albums (Schweizer Hitparade)	36
UK Albums (Official Charts)	28
UK R&B Albums (Official Charts)	1
US Top Album Sales (Billboard)	18
