= The In Sound from Way Out! (Beastie Boys album) =

Compilation album by The Beastie Boys
- Released: April 2, 1996
- Recorded: 1992–1996
- Genres: Jazz-funk, instrumental rock
- Length: 38:30
- Label: Capitol
- Producer: Mario Caldato Jr.

The Beastie Boys chronology
| Aglio e Olio (1995) | The In Sound from Way Out! (1996) | Hello Nasty (1998) |

The In Sound from Way Out! is an instrumental compilation by the Beastie Boys, released in 1996. The title and cover art concept were borrowed from the Perrey and Kingsley album of the same name.

Professional ratings
Review scores
| Source | Rating |
|---|---|
| AllMusic | 3/5 stars |
| Christgau’s Consumer Guide | (dud) |
| Entertainment Weekly | A− |
| Muzik | 4/5 stars |
| RapReviews | 7/10 |
| Rolling Stone | 2/5 stars |

== Track listing ==
=== CD version ===
All tracks are written by Beastie Boys and Nishita, except where indicated.

| No. | Title | Writer(s) | Length |
|---|---|---|---|
| 1. | "Groove Holmes" | | 2:33 |
| 2. | "Sabrosa" | Beastie Boys, Bobo, Nishita | 3:30 |
| 3. | "Namasté" | | 3:59 |
| 4. | "Pow" | | 2:13 |
| 5. | "Son of Neckbone" | B. Boys, Bobo, Nishita | 3:22 |
| 6. | "In 3's" | | 2:22 |
| 7. | "Eugene's Lament" | Beastie Boys, Bobo, Gore, Nishita | 2:13 |
| 8. | "Bobo on the Corner" | Beastie Boys, Bobo, Nishita | 1:13 |
| 9. | "Shambala" | B. Boys, Bobo, Nishita, Tibetan Organization | 3:15 |
| 10. | "Lighten Up" | | 2:46 |
| 11. | "Ricky's Theme" | Beastie Boys, Nishita, Bobo | 3:44 |
| 12. | "Transitions" | | 2:32 |
| 13. | "Drinkin' Wine" | | 4:40 |

Japanese bonus tracks (previously released on vinyl version of "Get It Together" / "Sabotage", as well as on "Sure Shot")
| No. | Title | Writer(s) | Length |
|---|---|---|---|
| 14. | "Get It Together (Buck Wild Inst)" | Beastie Boys, J Davis | 4:19 |
| 15. | "Get It Together (A. B. A. Inst)" | Beastie Boys, J Davis | 3:53 |
| 16. | "Sure Shot (European B-Boy Mix Inst)" | Beastie Boys, Mario Caldato Jr., DJ Hurricane | 3:03 |
| 17. | "Sure Shot (Large Professor Inst)" | Beastie Boys, Mario Caldato Jr., DJ Hurricane | 3:03 |

Notes

- Tracks 1, 3, 4, 6, and 10 are from Check Your Head (tracks 3 and 10 are alternate mixes without any vocals; track 1 has an edited intro)
- Track 5 is from the "Sure Shot" single
- Tracks 2, 7, 8, 9, 11, and 12, are from Ill Communication (track 8 is an alternate mix; track 9 contains a shorter intro)
- Track 13 is from the "Jimmy James" single

=== Special Edition Double Vinyl ===
All tracks are written by Beastie Boys and Nishita; except where indicated.

Side A
| No. | Title | Writer(s) | Length |
|---|---|---|---|
| 1. | "Ricky's Theme" | Beastie Boys, Nishita, Bobo | 3:44 |
| 2. | "Groove Holmes" | | 2:33 |
| 3. | "Pow" | | 2:13 |

Side B
| No. | Title | Writer(s) | Length |
|---|---|---|---|
| 4. | "Son of Neckbone" | B. Boys, Bobo, Nishita | 3:22 |
| 5. | "Bobo on the Corner" | Beastie Boys, Bobo, Nishita | 1:13 |
| 6. | "In 3's" | | 2:22 |
| 7. | "Eugene's Lament" | Beastie Boys, Bobo, Gore, Nishita | 2:13 |

Side C
| No. | Title | Writer(s) | Length |
|---|---|---|---|
| 8. | "Futterman's Rule" | | 3:42 |
| 9. | "Shambala" | B. Boys, Bobo, Nishita, Tibetan Organization | 3:15 |
| 10. | "Transitions" | | 2:32 |
| 11. | "Sabrosa" | Beastie Boys, Bobo, Nishita | 3:30 |

Side D
| No. | Title | Length |
|---|---|---|
| 12. | "Drinkin' Wine" | 4:40 |
| 13. | "Namasté" | 3:59 |
| 14. | "Lighten Up" | 2:46 |

== Certifications ==
| Region | Certification | Certified units/sales |
|---|---|---|
| United Kingdom (BPI) | Silver | 60,000^{‡} |
^{‡} Sales+streaming figures based on certification alone.
