= Hold It Now, Hit It =

Single by Beastie Boys

from the album Licensed to Ill
- Released: April 15, 1986
- Recorded: Spring 1986
- Genre: Hip-hop
- Length: 3:27
- Label: Def Jam/Columbia
- Songwriters: Michael Diamond, Adam Horovitz, Adam Yauch, Rick Rubin
- Producer: Rick Rubin

Beastie Boys singles chronology
"She's on It" (1985)	"Hold It Now, Hit It" (1986)	"Paul Revere" (1986)

Music video
- "Hold It Now, Hit It" on YouTube

"Hold It Now, Hit It" is a song by American hip-hop group Beastie Boys, released as the first single from their debut album Licensed to Ill. It is also remixed on the album New York State of Mind.

== Music video ==
The video features the three rappers lip synching, ad-libbing, and dancing on a sidewalk in front of and directly to a fish-eye lens interspersed with clips of them on stage and on tour.

== Track listing ==
All songs written by Adam Horovitz, Adam Yauch, Mike Diamond, and Rick Rubin.

7" single

1. "Hold It Now, Hit It" - 3:30
2. "Hold It Now, Hit It" (A cappella) - 3:20

12" single

1. "Hold It Now, Hit It" - 3:30
2. "Hold It Now, Hit It" (Instrumental) - 3:30
3. "Hold It Now, Hit It" (A cappella) - 3:20

== Charts ==
Chart (1986)	Peak position
U.S. Billboard Hot Dance Music/Maxi-Singles Sales	41
U.S. Billboard Hot Black Singles	55
