= Aglio e Olio (EP) =

EP by Beastie Boys
- Released: November 13, 1995
- Recorded: September 1995
- Genre: Hardcore punk
- Length: 13:19
- Label: Grand Royal
- Producer: Beastie Boys

Beastie Boys chronology
| Root Down (1995) | Aglio e Olio (1995) | The In Sound from Way Out! (1996) |

Aglio e Olio is an EP by the Beastie Boys, released in 1995. The EP showcases a return to the band's hardcore punk roots.

== Recording and release ==
The EP was released after the band realized that it had written too many hardcore punk songs for its next record. Michael "Mike D" Diamond later said, "When we first started working on Hello Nasty in New York, Amery "Awol" Smith was around helping us get set up. Along with the usual bunch of experimental jamming/sampling etc., we started playing a bunch of hardcore, putting song arrangements together really quickly. Then I started writing vocals. Soon we realized that we had way too many hardcore songs to possibly put on the next album, so we decided to release them all together as an EP."

"Aglio e Olio" means "garlic and oil" in Italian, a reference to spaghetti aglio e olio, one of the simplest pasta preparations. According to Mike D, the title was chosen "to let the kids know, it's eight songs but only ten minutes. It's important to let the people know". This made Aglio e Olio the first Beastie Boys release since 1982's Polly Wog Stew EP to feature entirely hardcore punk songs. Initial pressings of the CD and vinyl release came with a small adhesive label affixed with the following warning to music buyers: "Only 8 songs, Only 11 minutes, Only cheap $."

The EP was released to digital streaming services in 2020. A 180-gram clear vinyl reissue with two bonus tracks, "Soba Violence" and a cover of "Light My Fire", was released for Record Store Day on July 17, 2021.

== Critical reception ==
Professional ratings
Review scores
| Source | Rating |
|---|---|
| AllMusic | 2/5 stars |
| RapReviews | 7/10 |

Jam! Showbiz Music Reviews stated that the EP, and the song "Deal with It" in particular, "is entirely representative of the faster-louder sound, which makes the Ramones seem like restless experimentalists by comparison."

AllMusic awarded the EP two out of five stars, but did not publish a review.

== Track listing ==
All tracks are written by Beastie Boys and AWOL, except where noted.

| No. | Title | Writer(s) | Length |
|---|---|---|---|
| 1. | "Brand New" | | 1:24 |
| 2. | "Deal with It" | | 1:59 |
| 3. | "Believe Me" | | 1:19 |
| 4. | "Nervous Assistant" | | 0:43 |
| 5. | "Square Wave in Unison" | | 1:02 |
| 6. | "You Catch a Bad One" | | 1:21 |
| 7. | "I Can't Think Straight" | | 1:20 |
| 8. | "I Want Some" | | 2:02 |
| 9. | "Soba Violence" (bonus track on some releases) | | 1:14 |
| 10. | "Light My Fire" (bonus track on some releases) | John Densmore; Robby Krieger; Ray Manzarek; Jim Morrison | 1:59 |

== Charts ==
Chart performance for Aglio e Olio
| Chart (2021) | Peak position |
|---|---|
| US Billboard 200 | 118 |
