= Root Down (EP) =

EP by Beastie Boys
- Released: May 23, 1995
- Recorded: 1994–1995
- Genres: Alternative hip-hop, hardcore punk
- Length: 28:56
- Label: Capitol
- Producers: Beastie Boys, Mario Caldato Jr.

Beastie Boys chronology
Ill Communication (1994)	Root Down (1995)	Aglio e Olio (1995)

Professional ratings
Review scores
Source	Rating
AllMusic	2/5 stars
RapReviews	7/10

Root Down is an EP by American hip-hop group Beastie Boys, released in 1995.

The first three tracks are variations of the track "Root Down", from the Beastie Boys' 1994 album Ill Communication. The remaining seven tracks were recorded "live in Europe, winter 1995". The hidden track heard in the end is a radio jingle in Hebrew made in Israel's military radio station Galey Tzahal. It promoted a Beastie Boys special aired prior to their only two concerts in the country, in March 1995. When Mike D and Ad-Rock were interviewed at the station they heard the recording and asked for it.

== Track listing ==
All tracks are written by Beastie Boys except where noted.

No.	Title	Length
1.	"Root Down" (Free Zone Mix)	3:48
2.	"Root Down" (Ill Communication Mix)	3:31
3.	"Root Down" (PP Balloon Mix - produced by Prince Paul)	3:30
4.	"Time to Get Ill" (Horovitz, Yauch, Diamond, Rubin)	1:59
5.	"Heart Attack Man" (Beastie Boys, AWOL)	2:08
6.	"The Maestro"	3:14
7.	"Sabrosa" (Beastie Boys, Bobo, Money Mark)	2:53
8.	"Flute Loop" (Beastie Boys, Caldato, Al Kooper)	1:39
9.	"Time for Livin'" (Frontline)	1:58
10.	"Something's Got to Give" (Beastie Boys, Caldato, Money Mark) (Ends at 3:56. The hidden track can be heard at 4:28)	4:57
Total length:		28:56

== Charts ==
Chart (1995)	Peak position
Australian Albums Chart	43
Austrian Albums Chart	38
Canadian Albums Chart	48
Dutch Albums Chart	78
German Albums Chart	38
UK Albums Chart	23
US Billboard 200	50

== Certifications ==
Region	Certification	Certified units/sales
Canada (Music Canada)	Gold	50,000^{^}
^{^} Shipments figures based on certification alone.

== "Root Down" ==
"Root Down"

Promotional single by Beastie Boys

from the album Ill Communication
- Released: 1995
- Genre: Hip-hop; funk
- Length: 3:31
- Label: Grand Royal; Capitol
- Songwriters: Michael Diamond; Adam Horovitz; Adam Yauch
- Producers: Beastie Boys; Mario Caldato Jr.

Beastie Boys singles chronology
"Sure Shot" (1994)	"Root Down" (1995)	"Intergalactic" (1998)

"Root Down" is a song by Beastie Boys from their fourth studio album Ill Communication. The original version of the track, as well as two remixes of the track, are featured on the Root Down EP. It was released as a promo single in promotion of the Root Down EP; it also served as the fourth single from Ill Communication.

A sample from jazz musician Jimmy Smith's "Root Down (And Get It)", from his seminal album Root Down, serves as the basis for "Root Down". A small vocal sample from "Root Down" was later sampled on The Prodigy's 1997 track "Funky Shit".

=== Track listing ===
Promo CD single

1. "Root Down" (LP, Clean) – 3:32
2. "Root Down" (Free Zone Mix, Clean) – 3:47
3. "Root Down" (PP Balloon Mix, Clean) – 3:30

7" single

A. "Root Down" (Clean version) – 3:43
B. "Ricky's Theme" (Clean version) – 3:32
