= Rock Hard (song) =

Single by Beastie Boys
- Released: 1984
- Recorded: 1984
- Genre: Rap rock
- Length: 4:55
- Label: Def Jam
- Songwriters: Michael Diamond; Adam Horovitz; Adam Yauch; Rick Rubin; Angus Young; Malcolm Young; Brian Johnson
- Producer: Rick Rubin

Beastie Boys singles chronology
| "Cooky Puss" (1983) | "Rock Hard" (1984) | "She's on It" (1985) |

Professional ratings
Review scores
| Source | Rating |
|---|---|
| AllMusic | 4/5 stars |
| Christgau's Record Guide | B+ |

"Rock Hard" (1985)

"Rock Hard" is a single by the Beastie Boys, released by Def Jam Records on 12" in 1984. The track contains samples from the AC/DC song "Back in Black", which was used without obtaining legal permission, causing the record to be withdrawn. When the group planned to include the out-of-print song on their 1999 compilation, Beastie Boys Anthology: The Sounds of Science, AC/DC refused to clear the sample. Mike D spoke to AC/DC's Malcolm Young personally on the phone when their lawyers refused to clear the sample, and later said that "AC/DC could not get with the sample concept. They were just like, 'Nothing against you guys, but we just don't endorse sampling.'" Ad-Rock then added, "So we told them that we don't endorse people playing guitars."

== Reception ==
John Leland of Spin noted the song's, "parodic extremes. I mean, no one has a beat this big and this wet. While this platter delivers ample boasts for the buck, the Beasties never take themselves or their genre too seriously."

== Track listing ==
Side A
| No. | Title | Length |
|---|---|---|
| 1. | "Rock Hard" | 4:55 |
| 2. | "Party's Gettin' Rough" | 5:58 |

Side B
| No. | Title | Length |
|---|---|---|
| 1. | "Beastie Groove" | 3:37 |
| 2. | "Beastie Groove" (instrumental) | 3:37 |
