= Sabotage (Beastie Boys song) =

Single by Beastie Boys

from the album Ill Communication
- Released: May 9, 1994
- Genre: Rap rock; punk rock; alternative rock
- Length: 2:58
- Label: Grand Royal; Capitol
- Songwriters: Michael Diamond; Adam Horovitz; Adam Yauch
- Producers: Beastie Boys; Mario Caldato Jr.

Beastie Boys singles chronology
"Professor Booty" (1992)	"Sabotage" (1994)	"Get It Together" (1994)

Music video
- "Sabotage" on YouTube

"Sabotage" is a song by the American rap rock group Beastie Boys, released by Grand Royal Records in January 1994 as the first single from their fourth studio album, Ill Communication (1994). The song was written by the group and produced by them with Mario Caldato Jr. It features traditional rock instrumentation (Ad-Rock on guitar, MCA on bass, and Mike D on drums), turntable scratches, heavily distorted bass guitar riffs and lead vocals by Ad-Rock. A moderate commercial success and later significant critical success, the song was applauded for its impactful lyrics and melody as well as its humorous video, directed by Spike Jonze; it was also nominated in five categories at the 1994 MTV Music Video Awards as well as winning an award at the 1994 Billboard Music Video Awards.

In 2004, the Rolling Stone magazine ranked "Sabotage" No. 475 on their list of the 500 Greatest Songs of All Time. In 2010, it was dropped to No. 480. In a 2021 updated list, Rolling Stone re-ranked the song at No. 245. In March 2005, Q magazine placed it at No. 46 in its list of the 100 Greatest Guitar Tracks, and was ranked No. 19 on VH1's 100 Greatest Songs of the 90s list. Pitchfork Media included the song at No. 39 on their Top 200 Tracks of the 90s list.

== Background ==
The song was first conceived when MCA played the signature bass line one day in the studio and it immediately caught the band's attention. Both Ad-Rock and Mike D picked up their respective instruments and started building on it. According to the 2018 Beastie Boys Book, the song, which was originally called "Chris Rock" (after a sound engineer called Chris who thought it rocked), was a humorous jab at their producer Mario Caldato Jr.'s repeated urgings that the Beastie Boys actually get some work done. As Ad-Rock stated in the 2020 Beastie Boys Story documentary, the lyrics are a fictitious rant about how Caldato "was the worst person ever and how he was always sabotaging us and holding us back."

According to Caldato, the instrumental track was an example of one that "evolved out of nothing" whilst the Beasties were jamming together, though they were concerned that the tune was overly-rock-centric for them and struggled to develop lyrics for it. Towards the end of the recording of the album, Ad-Rock proposed trying again with some new lyrics he had just written. The lead vocals were recorded at Caldato's home studio using hand-held microphones that gave the recording a more thick and rough sound, with the bridge, backing, and record-scratches being added at G-Son Studios the next day. Caldato described the impact of the track as immediately electric: "It just had so much more energy and sounded so different. When we'd play it to people, they'd freak out. That's what the record needed".

== Critical reception ==
Upon the release, Larry Flick from Billboard magazine wrote, "Loud, aggressive, and probably likely to spur senseless acts of vandalism by teen wannabes, but showcases Beasties' devotion to punk and old-school rap–mostly the former. All that and a nice, compact, three-minute package perfect for radio play, with some modern rock outlets already aboard." Chuck Campbell from Knoxville News Sentinel said that on the song, "over-the-top rage and bossy noise are key elements in a hybrid of vitriolic rap and edgy rock." Gina Morris from Select named "Sabotage" Single of the Month with "Get It Together", writing, "'Sabotage' is a hard-edged, full-on meaty guitar-rap gatecrash, which makes them sound less like rich 'street kids' and more like clever sods." Charles Aaron from Spin ranked it number five in his list of the "Top 20 Singles of the Year" in December 1994.

Paste, NME, and American Songwriter all named "Sabotage" as the Beastie Boys' greatest song. In 2024, Esquire ranked it number nine in their "The 50 Best Songs of the ’90s".

== Music video ==
The accompanying music video for "Sabotage", directed by Spike Jonze and played extensively on MTV, is a homage to, and parody of, 1970s crime drama shows such as Hawaii Five-O, The Streets of San Francisco, S.W.A.T., Baretta, and Starsky and Hutch. The video is presented as the opening credits of a fictional 1970s-style police show called Sabotage, with the band members appearing as the show's protagonists. Each band member is introduced as a fictional actor, and the names of the characters are also given. The first documented appearance of the video on MTV was during an episode of 120 Minutes on May 22, 1994.

The characters appearing on the show are (in order of credits):

- Sir Stewart Wallace guest-starring as himself (played by MCA)
- Nathan Wind as Cochese (also played by MCA)
- Vic Colfari as Bobby, "The Rookie" (played by Ad-Rock)
- Alasondro Alegré as "The Chief" (played by Mike D)
- Fred Kelly as Bunny (played by DJ Hurricane)

Jonze's future wife Sofia Coppola, along with co-host Zoe Cassavetes, conducted an in-character mock interview with the "cast" of Sabotage on the second episode of her short-lived Comedy Central show Hi Octane (and the clip would later be included on the Beastie Boys Video Anthology DVD released in 2000).

Additionally, in the DVD commentary for the 1996 film Trainspotting, Danny Boyle credits the film's opening credits to those used in "Sabotage."

Actress Amy Poehler reviewed the music video in 2018's Beastie Boys Book saying that "there would be no Anchorman, no Wes Anderson, no Lonely Island, and no channel called Adult Swim if this video did not exist".

=== Censorship ===
Some scenes had to be removed when the video was shown on MTV, including a knife fight sequence, a scene in which a man is thrown out of a car into a street, and one where another man is thrown off a bridge and is shown violently hitting the ground, despite the bodies thrown being shown to be stunt dummies.

=== Awards ===
The video for "Sabotage" was nominated for Video of the Year, Best Group Video, Breakthrough Video, Best Direction in a Video, and Viewer's Choice at the 1994 MTV Video Music Awards. However, it lost all five categories it was nominated in, losing Video of the Year, Best Group Video and Viewer's Choice to Aerosmith's "Cryin'", and Breakthrough Video and Best Direction in a Video to R.E.M.'s "Everybody Hurts". During R.E.M. lead singer Michael Stipe's acceptance speech for the Best Direction award, Beastie Boys member MCA bum-rushed the stage in his "Nathaniel Hornblower" disguise, interrupting Stipe to protest the shutout of "Sabotage" from every category it was nominated in.

"Sabotage" won an award at the 1994 Billboard Music Video Awards in November 1994 for Clip of the Year in the category of Alternative/Modern Rock. In the same year, Spike Jonze won an award in the category for Direction and Eric Zumbrunnen won for Editing at the 1994 Music Video Production Awards in Los Angeles. At the 2009 MTV Video Music Awards, the video won best video in the new category of "Best Video (That Should Have Won a Moonman)".

== Personnel ==
Personnel taken from Sound on Sound.

Beastie Boys

- Adam "Ad-Rock" Horovitz – lead vocals, guitar, turntable scratches
- Adam "MCA" Yauch – bass guitar, backing vocals, turntable scratches
- Michael "Mike D" Diamond – drums, backing vocals

Additional musicians

- Money Mark – organ
- Eric Bobo – timbales

== In popular culture ==
- The song is playing at the Limelight nightclub in Greenwich village where Rictor and Shatterstar are spending the night in X-Force Vol 1 #43
- Beavis and Butthead review the video with Beavis asking when the real Sabotage show is going to come out.
- The band Phish covered the song in their 1998 concerts at Hampton Coliseum, and it appears on the live album of those concerts, Hampton Comes Alive.
- During Saturday Night Live's 25th Anniversary Special in 1999, the band played the first fifteen seconds of the song before their performance was "sabotaged" by Elvis Costello, who in 1977 had done the same to one of his own songs on the show; the Beastie Boys then accompanied him on "Radio, Radio", the song performed during the original incident.
- In the 1999 Futurama episode "Hell Is Other Robots", the Beastie Boys perform several songs, including an a cappella version of the song.
- The song is included in the track list for the 2007 video games Guitar Hero III: Legends of Rock and Rock Band.
- The roller coaster X² at Six Flags Magic Mountain has an on-board soundtrack that features Sabotage, which can be heard from after the first drop until the final brake run.
- The song is heard early in J. J. Abrams' 2009 Star Trek film, played on a car stereo by an adolescent James T. Kirk. This is one of the few uses of licensed music in a Star Trek production. The song also plays a crucial part in the plot of the 2016 sequel Star Trek Beyond, in which it is used by Kirk and his officers to disrupt an alien attack on a Federation starbase.
- The song was covered by hardcore punk band Cancer Bats for their 2010 album Bears, Mayors, Scraps & Bones.
- The song is included on the soundtrack of the 2012 film This Means War.
- In 2013, the song was heavily played and used in the soundtrack of one episode of How I Met Your Mother.
- Finnish band Steve 'n' Seagulls performed a version of the song in November 2015 for The A.V. Club's A.V. Undercover series.
- The song played during the Bronco chase scene in The People v. O.J. Simpson: American Crime Story.
- The animated TV comedy series Family Guy used "Sabotage" in the 2016 episode "The New Adventures of Old Tom" for Peter and Tom Tucker's skateboarding video.
- The song played during the tailgate chase scene in Neighbors 2: Sorority Rising.
- The song is featured in the live-action trailer "New Heroes Will Rise" for the 2017 video game Destiny 2.
- Bubs is shown dressed as Nathan Wind as Cochese in the Homestar Runner 2014 Halloween special, "I Killed Pom Pom".
- The song is featured in the official trailer for Illumination's Minions: The Rise of Gru.
- The animated TV comedy series American Dad featured "Rabbitage" a leporine-themed parody song by "Weird Al" Yankovic in the 2020 episode "First, Do No Farm".
- The song is featured in the 2022 Steven Soderbergh film Kimi during the final action sequence.
- The opening few seconds of the song is used in the movie "Red Notice" during the start of a would-be chase scene.
- The song is used in the starting lineup introductions and lead-up to tip-off at home games of the National Basketball League's Sydney Kings at Qudos Bank Arena since season 2021–22.
- The Seattle Kraken take the ice to the song prior to starting lineups as of the 2022–23 season.
- Members of Korn and Slipknot collaborated on a live version of the song, at a 2015 London concert.
- The song was featured in the video game Fortnite Festival as a jam track.
- In the Amazon MGM Studios film Heads of State (2025) the track is played during a shootout between the lead characters and antagonist’s terrorist unit. The scene follows CIA Agent Marty Comer (Jack Quaid) as he uses technology and wits to kill enemy combatants.
- The song is used in the opening segment of the 2026 Academy Awards, during the montage of show host Conan O'Brien, donning Aunt Gladys makeup, being chased by a group of kids, a reference to the 2025 film Weapons.

== Charts ==
Chart (1994)	Peak position
Australia (ARIA)	94
Canada Top Singles (RPM)	38
Netherlands (Single Top 100)	35
UK Singles (OCC)	19
UK Dance (OCC)	21
US Billboard Bubbling Under Hot 100 Singles	15
US Alternative Airplay (Billboard)	18

== Certifications ==
Region	Certification	Certified units/sales
New Zealand (RMNZ)	Platinum	30,000^{‡}
United Kingdom (BPI)	Platinum	600,000^{‡}
^{‡} Sales+streaming figures based on certification alone.
