= She's on It =

1985 single by Beastie Boys

Single by Beastie Boys

from the album Krush Groove soundtrack
- B-side: "Slow and Low"
- Released: September 12, 1985
- Length: 3:32
- Label: Def Jam; Columbia
- Songwriter: Beastie Boys
- Producer: Rick Rubin

Beastie Boys singles chronology
"Rock Hard" (1984)	"She's on It" (1985)	"Hold It Now, Hit It" (1986)

Music video
- "She's on It" on YouTube

"She's on It" is a song by American rap rock group Beastie Boys. It was released on September 12, 1985, as the fifth single from the soundtrack to the 1985 film Krush Groove. The song's guitar riff is a slightly slower version of the riff in Cheap Trick's 1978 song "Stiff Competition," which in turn was based on the riff in the Who's 1971 song "Won't Get Fooled Again." Despite failing to attract commercial success at the time of its initial release in 1985, a re-release in 1987 was more successful, becoming a top-10 hit on the UK Singles Chart and reaching the top 50 in Ireland, the Netherlands, and West Germany.

== Critical reception ==
Cash Box said that it "makes up in rhythm what it lacks in lyrics and musicianship."

== Music video ==
The song's video was Executive Produced by Rick Rubin produced by Larry Shapiro and directed by producer and filmmaker Sean Travis, who later, in the 2000s, produced MTV's reality television series The Hills and The City. It was the band's first professionally produced music video and their third video overall, after 1981's Holy Snappers and Egg Raid On Mojo in 1982. Filmed in Long Beach in New York's Nassau County, the boys are trying to win the heart of a woman (Sharon Middendorf) on the beach, but their efforts are foiled by stampeding female fans. Not even the assistance of a mentor (played by Rick Rubin) can help them. Their attempts range from using Spanish Fly to flying over her in a helicopter and a net, and they even attempt to blow her up. She survives while the boys struggle to start the dynamite, and suddenly, it blows up and the video concludes. The video was included in the band's 1987 CBS/Fox Video compilation, but has not been included on any video release since.

== Track listings ==
7-inch single (1985)

A. "She's on It" – 3:28
B. "Slow and Low" – 3:37

12-inch single (1985)

A. "She's on It" – 4:15
B. "Slow and Low" – 3:37

12-inch single (1987)

A1. "She's on It" – 4:15
B2. "Hold It Now, Hit It" – 3:30
B2. "Slow and Low" – 3:37

== Charts ==
Chart (1987)	Peak position
Europe (European Hot 100 Singles)	42
Ireland (IRMA)	15
Netherlands (Dutch Top 40 Tipparade)	6
Netherlands (Single Top 100)	23
UK Singles (Official Charts)	10
West Germany (GfK)	44

== Release history ==
Region	Date	Format(s)	Label(s)	Ref.
United States	September 12, 1985	7-inch vinyl; 12-inch vinyl	Def Jam; Columbia	
United Kingdom	July 6, 1987	7-inch vinyl; 12-inch vinyl	Def Jam; Columbia	
