= The Wired CD =

2004 compilation album by various artists

Compilation album by Various artists
- Released: November 2004

Singles from The Wired CD
- 1. "Now Get Busy" Released: 2004

The Wired CD is an album that was released in 2004 as a collaborative effort between Wired magazine, Creative Commons (CC), and sixteen musicians and groups. The Wired CD was distributed inside the front cover of the November 2004 issue of Wired, which also featured a variety of interviews and bios of the performers. Unusually, the songs were released under one of two Creative Commons Licenses, permitting sampling and file-sharing of the songs.

The WIRED CD was the first major compilation of music free to sample and share under Creative Commons' "some rights reserved" copyright. The groundbreaking album features tracks from the Beastie Boys, David Byrne, Zap Mama, My Morning Jacket, Spoon, Gilberto Gil, Dan the Automator, Thievery Corporation, Le Tigre, Paul Westerberg, Fine Arts Militia featuring Chuck D, The Rapture, Cornelius, Danger Mouse & Jemini, DJ Dolores, and Matmos.

In 2005, Creative Commons and Wired Magazine launched The Fine Art of Sampling Contest in which contestants sampled the tracks from The Wired CD to create their own composition. The top winning entries were subsequently compiled onto a CD entitled The Wired CD: Ripped. Sampled. Mashed. Shared.

== Licenses ==
All but three songs are released under the Sampling Plus license:

People can take and transform pieces of [the] work for any purpose other than advertising, which is prohibited. Noncommercial copying and distribution (like file-sharing) of the entire work are also allowed. Hence, "plus".

The songs by the Beastie Boys (track 1), My Morning Jacket (track 4), and Chuck D with Fine Arts Militia (track 11) are released under the Noncommercial Sampling Plus license:

People can take and transform pieces of [the] work for noncommercial purposes only. Noncommercial copying and distribution (like file-sharing) of the entire work are also allowed.

== Tracklist ==
No.	Title	Artist	Length
1.	"Now Get Busy"	Beastie Boys	2:22
2.	"My Fair Lady"	David Byrne	3:28
3.	"Wadidyusay?"	Zap Mama	3:16
4.	"One Big Holiday"	My Morning Jacket	5:19
5.	"Revenge!"	Spoon	2:25
6.	"Oslodum"	Gilberto Gil	3:55
7.	"Relaxation Spa Treatment"	Dan the Automator	3:22
8.	"DC 3000"	Thievery Corporation	4:24
9.	"Fake French"	Le Tigre	2:50
10.	"Looking Up in Heaven"	Paul Westerberg	3:09
11.	"No Meaning No"	Chuck D with Fine Arts Militia	3:10
12.	"Sister Saviour" (Blackstrobe Remix)	The Rapture	7:02
13.	"Wataridori 2"	Cornelius	7:05
14.	"What U Sittin' On?" (starring Cee Lo and Tha Alkaholiks)	Danger Mouse & Jemini	3:24
15.	"Oslodum 2004" (includes (cc) sample of "Oslodum" by Gilberto Gil)	DJ Dolores	3:57
16.	"Action at a Distance"	Matmos	2:41
Total length:			57:52

== The Freestyle Mix Contest ==
All is here.

Entrants in the Fine Art of Sampling Contests were challenged with sampling or mashing up the WIRED tracks to produce new works judged on their originality, incorporation of the sampled songs, and technical merit. The contests included two categories of competition, the winners of which appear below.

WIRED Magazine music editors and contributors chose eleven winners to appear on the forthcoming, Creative Commons-produced WIRED CD—Ripped. Sampled. Mashed. Shared. The winning tracks were:

- "Bored on Your Backside" by Trifonic
- "counterfeit funk (the open source conspiracy)" by jsn
- "My Fair Hiphop (Challenge Mix)" by VEGO featuring DJ AKA
- "Dangerouse" by Ashwan
- "dislocation" by Sllid
- "freemix-simplemix" by Cezary Ostrowski
- "hiphop holiday (stoner rap mix)" by Short Faced Bear
- "Gil's Zapture Loop" by megabuzz
- "out of my way" by Prof. m.Stereo
- "Revolve" by hisboyelroy
- "Beatgorilla's 28 grams Remix" by Pat Chilla The Beat Gorilla

== The Militia Mix Contest ==
All is here.

Brian Hardgroove (Fine Arts Militia) and Scott Egbert (GigAmerica) chose one winner of the Militia Mix Contest for inclusion on the next Fine Arts Militia album (featuring Chuck D), slated for a Spring 2005 release. The winner was "On Meaning On" by heavyconfetti.

== See also ==
- Share-alike
