= The Mix-Up =

Studio album by Beastie Boys
- Released: June 26, 2007
- Recorded: 2006–2007
- Studios: Oscilloscope Laboratories, New York City
- Genres: Instrumental rock; jazz-funk; funk rock; funk; soul jazz
- Length: 42:43
- Label: Capitol
- Producer: Beastie Boys

Beastie Boys chronology
Solid Gold Hits (2005)	The Mix-Up (2007)	Hot Sauce Committee Part Two (2011)

Singles from The Mix-Up
- 1. "Electric Worm" Released: 2007; 2. "Off the Grid" Released: 2007

The Mix-Up is the seventh studio album by the American hip-hop group Beastie Boys, released on June 26, 2007. The album consists entirely of instrumental performances and won a Grammy Award for Best Pop Instrumental Album.

== Background ==
On May 1, 2007, an e-mail sent to those on Beastie Boys' mailing list revealed the album is all instrumental.

OK, here's our blurb about our new album — it spits hot fire! — hot shit! it's official... it's named THE MIX-UP. g'wan. all instrumental record. "see i knew they were gonna do that!" that's a quote from you. check the track listing and cover below. you love us. don't you?"

On June 21, 2007, a legal stream of the entire album was released on BrooklynVegan.com. Drummer Mike D said that "even though The Mix-Up is a 'post-punk instrumental' album, the Beasties have no plans to ditch vocals for good. In fact, they are currently planning another version of the album that will feature collaborations with 'a pretty wide array' of 'mostly newer' vocalists." Two singers speculated to be featured on the vocal version were Jarvis Cocker and M.I.A.

In an interview with The Aquarian Weekly, published in February 2008, the band was asked if they were making a statement about the status of hip-hop music by releasing an album strictly of instrumentals. “In a way, the album was a reaction to our hip-hop," said Ad-Rock "Our last record was an all rap record, so when we started recording [The Mix Up] we wanted to work with some instruments, and it just sounded cool, so we kept with it.” Mike D expanded on Ad-Rock's response, adding, "We get asked, ‘What do you think of the state of hip-hop today?’ a lot. Maybe I’m being defensive, but it seems like people always look for us to come out and criticize hip-hop. But hip-hop is what we grew up on, and it continues to be one of the only forms of music left that strives on evolution and innovation. Yeah, we might be in a spell where we’re waiting for that next record to come out and change everything—but still, that’s what hip-hop is and that’s what puts it in its unique place.”

== Reception ==
Professional ratings
Aggregate scores
Source	Rating
Metacritic	61/100
Review scores
Source	Rating
AllMusic	3.5/5 stars
The A.V. Club	B
Entertainment Weekly	C+
The Guardian	3/5 stars
NME	4/10
Pitchfork	4.6/10
PopMatters	6/10
Rolling Stone	3/5 stars
Stylus Magazine	B−
Uncut	4/5 stars

According to the review aggregator Metacritic, The Mix-Up received "generally favorable reviews" based on a weighted average score of 61 out of 100 from 22 critic scores. Uncut magazine gave it four stars out of five, saying "The Mix-Up is the best record collection ever thoroughly digested and re-imagined by a bunch of guys in love with sound."

The album debuted at number 15 on the U.S. Billboard 200, selling 44,000 copies in its first week. It was their lowest charting album in the US. The Mix-Up won a Grammy in the Best Pop Instrumental category.

== In popular culture ==
=== Radio ===
- "14th St. Break" was featured in the regional disconnection curtain of Chilean radio station Rock & Pop during 2009 to February 2014.

== Track listing ==
All tracks are written by Beastie Boys, except where noted.

No.	Title	Writer(s)	Length
1.	"B for My Name"		3:31
2.	"14th St. Break"		3:34
3.	"Suco de Tangerina"		3:17
4.	"The Gala Event"	Beastie Boys; Mark Nishita	3:47
5.	"Electric Worm"		3:15
6.	"Freaky Hijiki"	Beastie Boys; Nishita	3:05
7.	"Off the Grid"		4:36
8.	"The Rat Cage"		3:37
9.	"The Melee"	Beastie Boys; Nishita	3:10
10.	"Dramastically Different"	Beastie Boys; Nishita	3:57
11.	"The Cousin of Death"		3:06
12.	"The Kangaroo Rat"	Beastie Boys; Nishita	3:28
13.	"Biscuits and Butter" (iTunes bonus track)		4:19

The Mix-Up Bonus Tracks – EP
No.	Title	Length
1.	"Politickin'"	3:57
2.	"Beasley Is a Beast"	3:49
3.	"LTD"	3:12
4.	"The Panda Rat"	3:40
5.	"The Mix-Up"	3:34
6.	"Fibonacci Sequence"	3:13

== Personnel ==
Beastie Boys

- Ad-Rock – guitars, producer, engineer, art direction
- MCA – bass guitar and upright basses, producer, engineer, art direction
- Mike D – drums, producer, engineer, art direction

Additional musicians

- Money Mark – clavinet, Rhodes, Farfisa
- Alfredo Ortiz – percussion

Technical

- Jon Weiner – engineer
- Greg Calbi – mastering
- Bill McMullen – illustration, package design

== Charts ==
Chart (2007)	Peak position
US Billboard 200	15
