= An Exciting Evening at Home with Shadrach, Meshach and Abednego =

EP by Beastie Boys
- Released: October 30, 1989
- Recorded: 1988
- Genre: Rap rock
- Length: 25:03
- Label: Capitol
- Producers: Beastie Boys, Dust Brothers

Beastie Boys chronology
Paul's Boutique (1989)	An Exciting Evening at Home with Shadrach, Meshach and Abednego (1989)	Check Your Head (1992)

Professional ratings
Review scores
Source	Rating
AllMusic	2.5/5 stars

An Exciting Evening at Home with Shadrach, Meshach and Abednego is an EP by rap trio Beastie Boys. It was released on October 30, 1989.

The title refers to the biblical story of Shadrach, Meshach, and Abednego and the fiery furnace in the Book of Daniel. However, the lyrics "Shadrach, Meshach, Abednego" in the title track are used and sampled from Sly Stone's "Loose Booty", where they are repeated and spoken rhythmically throughout the track in an almost rap-like form. The cover of the EP features a painting depicting Shadrach, Meshach, and Abednego in the Catacomb of Priscilla in Rome.

== Track listing ==
All tracks are written by Beastie Boys and Dust Brothers, except "Your Sister's Def" by Andre Brown and Anthony Davis.

Side One
No.	Title	Length
1.	"Shadrach"	4:07
2.	"Caught in the Middle of a 3-Way Mix"	2:32
3.	"And What You Give Is What You Get"	3:42

Side Two
No.	Title	Length
1.	"Car Thief"	3:39
2.	"Some Dumb Cop Gave Me 2 Tickets Already"	3:33
3.	"Your Sister's Def"	4:58
