= Sure Shot =

1994 single by Beastie Boys

Single by Beastie Boys

from the album Ill Communication
- Released: November 14, 1994
- Studio: G-Son, Atwater Village; Tin Pan Alley, New York City
- Length: 3:20
- Label: Grand Royal; Capitol
- Songwriters: Beastie Boys; DJ Hurricane; Mario Caldato Jr.; Jeremy Steig
- Producers: Beastie Boys; Mario Caldato Jr.

Beastie Boys singles chronology
"Get It Together" (1994)	"Sure Shot" (1994)	"Root Down" (1995)

Music video
- "Sure Shot" on YouTube

"Sure Shot" is a song by American hip-hop group Beastie Boys, released by Grand Royal and Capitol as the third single from their fourth album, Ill Communication (1994), in November 1994. The song was co-written by the group with Mario Caldato Jr., who also co-produced it with them. It features a looped sample of jazz flautist Jeremy Steig's song "Howlin' for Judy" from the 1970 album Legwork. The brief vocal sample after the second verse ("Oh yes indeed, it's fun time") was taken from a comedy record by Moms Mabley.

== Release ==
The CD and cassette maxi single (with a total of 7 tracks) features three remixes of the title track, by Large Professor, Mike Nardone and Dred Scott, and the Prunes, respectively.

It also features 3 new songs, "Mullet Head" (a punk-rock-style song whose title references the much-ridiculed mullet hair-style), "Son of Neckbone" (an instrumental track) and "The Vibes", a more traditional rap song akin to "Sure Shot". "Mullet Head" was also featured on the 1994 EP Pretzel Nugget.

== Critical reception ==
Upon the release, Larry Flick from Billboard magazine wrote, "It's in there. The kooky trio rarely misfires, having become experts at their hybrid of frat-rap and rock. Ever aware of the old school, the Beasties shout, scratch, and sample a frantic masterpiece of twisted flutes, barking dogs, and juvenile lyrics. Ill and real." Pan-European magazine Music & Media noted, "Coming to you with a screen saver for your PC, the Brooklyn scumbags have singled out one of the purest hip-hop tracks from their "media rehabilitation" album, III Communication."

According to various publications, the song is noteworthy for including the verse:

“I want to say a little something that’s long overdue/The disrespect to women has got to be through/To all the mothers and sisters and wives and friends/I wanna offer my love and respect to the end.”

The verse is widely considered to be a contrition for the group's early lyrics and demeanor which are perceived by some as misogynous.

== Music video ==
Directed by American filmmaker, actor, musician, and photographer Spike Jonze, the music video for "Sure Shot" features the group, along with DJ Hurricane, performing, skating, and wearing suits while attending a party.

== Track listing ==
1. "Sure Shot" (LP Version)
2. "Sure Shot" (Large Professor Remix)
3. "Mullet Head"
4. "The Vibes"
5. "Sure Shot" (Nardone Mix)
6. "Son Of Neckbone"
7. "Sure Shot" (European B-Boy Mix)

== Charts ==
Chart (1994)	Peak position
Australia (ARIA)	129
Netherlands (Single Top 100)	15
UK Singles (OCC)	27
US Billboard Hot Dance Music/Maxi-Singles Sales	48
