= Ill Communication =

Studio album by Beastie Boys
- Released: May 23, 1994
- Recorded: 1993–1994
- Studios: Tin Pan Alley (New York City); G-Son (Los Angeles)
- Genres: Hip-hop; punk rock; jazz; funk
- Length: 59:37
- Labels: Grand Royal; Capitol
- Producers: Beastie Boys; Mario Caldato, Jr.

Beastie Boys chronology
| Some Old Bullshit (1994) | Ill Communication (1994) | Root Down (1995) |

Singles from Ill Communication
- 1. "Sabotage / Get It Together" Released: May 9, 1994; 2. "Sure Shot" Released: November 14, 1994

Ill Communication is the fourth studio album by the American hip-hop group Beastie Boys, released on May 23, 1994, by Grand Royal and Capitol Records. Co-produced by Beastie Boys and Mario Caldato, Jr., it is among the band's most varied releases, drawing from hip-hop, punk rock, jazz, and funk, and continues their trend away from sampling and towards live instruments, which began with their previous release, Check Your Head (1992). The album features musical contributions from Money Mark, Eric Bobo and Amery "AWOL" Smith, and vocal contributions from Q-Tip and Biz Markie. Beastie Boys were influenced by Miles Davis's jazz rock albums On the Corner (1972) and Agharta (1975) while recording Ill Communication.

The album became the band's second number-one album on the U.S. Billboard 200 chart and their second album to be certified triple platinum by the Recording Industry Association of America (RIAA). It was supported by the single "Sabotage", which was accompanied by a music video directed by Spike Jonze that parodied 1970s cop shows.

The album received critical acclaim both at the time of its release and in years since, and has appeared on best-of lists for albums released in the 1990s.

== Background ==
Coming off of their commercial and critical rebound in Check Your Head, the band became more ambitious in their dealings and projects. They formed their Grand Royal records and signed numerous other artists while also contributing to the AIDS benefit album No Alternative and publishing their magazine Grand Royal Magazine. During this time, from 1993 to 1994, they recorded their fourth album at Tin Pan Alley and G-Son Studios.

== Release ==
The album released on May 23rd, 1994. The album debuted on the Billboard 200 at no. 1 the week of June 18th, 1994, in addition to charting in over a dozen other countries. The album would ultimately remain on the charts for 63 weeks, and would eventually be certified 3× platinum by the RIAA.

=== Singles ===
"Sabotage" was the first single taken from Ill Communication. It was released to radio on May 9, 1994. The backing track of the song was laid down by the band members, driven by MCA's fuzzed and twangy bass, at Tin Pan Alley Studios in New York, and then sat unused for a year, with the working title of "Chris Rock", before vocals were added. According to Ad-Rock in the 2020 documentary Beastie Boys Story, the lyrics are a fictitious rant about how their producer "was the worst person ever and how he was always sabotaging us and holding us back."

It was released together with "Get It Together", which samples The Moog Machine's cover of "Aquarius/Let the Sunshine In".

"Sure Shot" features a sample taken from jazz flautist Jeremy Steig's song "Howlin' For Judy" from the 1970 album Legwork as the main instrumental part of the song, and was released as a single in November 1994. The album's fourth single, "Root Down", was released in May 1995 as its own EP.

== Artwork ==
Mike D and MCA collaborated with Gibran Evans, son of the artist and designer Jim Evans (who designed a hand-drawn typeface specifically for Ill Communication that was used throughout the promotion of the album), to create the album's packaging. The photograph they chose for the front cover was taken by Bruce Davidson in 1964 at a Los Angeles drive-in diner called Tiny Naylor's as part of an assignment for Esquire, but the magazine ultimately did not publish the photos. Although Davidson had not heard the Beastie Boys' music and did not understand it once he did—he later recalled thinking it sounded like a "secret language" when they sent him a demo tape—he agreed to let the band use his photo.

The booklet that came with the album features the artwork "Gaia" by Alex Grey on the middle pages.

== Critical reception ==
Professional ratings
Review scores
| Source | Rating |
|---|---|
| AllMusic | 4/5 stars |
| The A.V. Club | A− |
| Entertainment Weekly | B |
| Los Angeles Times | 3.5/4 stars |
| NME | 8/10 |
| Pitchfork | 8.6/10 |
| Q | 4/5 stars |
| Rolling Stone | 4/5 stars |
| Select | 4/5 |
| The Village Voice | A− |

Ill Communication received critical acclaim and is often regarded as one of Beastie Boys' best albums. Writing for The Village Voice, Robert Christgau rated the album "A-" and wrote, "Although once again it's short on dynamite, at least it starts with a bang. Two bangs, actually, one hip hop and one hardcore--their loyalty to their roots closely resembles an enlightened acceptance of their limitations. With each boy having evolved into his own particular man, the rhymes are rich and the synthesis is complex."

Writing for Pitchfork, Nate Patrin gave the album an 8.6 out of 10, writing, "It's still regarded in some circles as a water-treading attempt to continue drawing off the aggro-punk/garage-funk blueprint of Check Your Head, and lord knows I'll probably draw some what-the-fucks for opining that Ill Communication's actually a fair bit better. But once the Beasties got a steady grip on their live-band sound, the fact that they found a way to reincorporate the gleefully adolescent goofiness of Licensed to Ill and the retro-funk style and pop-culture obsessions of Paul's Boutique is what really let them put together their ideal here-to-stay mission statement."

== Legacy ==
The album has received numerous accolades since its release, placing at number 15 on The Village Voice's 1994 Pazz & Jop critics' poll, number 19 on Spin's list of the "20 Best Albums of '94", number three on NME's list of the "Top 50 Albums of 1994", and number 13 on The Wire's annual critics' poll. Guitar World included the album in its "Superunknown: 50 Iconic Albums That Defined 1994" list. Rolling Stone included the album in its list of "Essential Recordings of the 90s", and Q included the album in its list of the "90 Best Albums of the 1990s". Mojo ranked the album number 54 on its list of "100 Modern Classics". The album was also included in the book 1001 Albums You Must Hear Before You Die.

== Track listing ==
All tracks produced by Beastie Boys and Mario Caldato, Jr.

| No. | Title | Writer(s) | Length |
|---|---|---|---|
| 1. | "Sure Shot" | Beastie Boys; Caldato; DJ Hurricane | 3:19 |
| 2. | "Tough Guy" | Beastie Boys; Amery Smith | 0:57 |
| 3. | "B-Boys Makin' with the Freak Freak" | Beastie Boys | 3:36 |
| 4. | "Bobo on the Corner" | Beastie Boys; "Money" Mark Nishita; Eric Bobo | 1:13 |
| 5. | "Root Down" | Beastie Boys | 3:32 |
| 6. | "Sabotage" | Beastie Boys | 2:58 |
| 7. | "Get It Together" (featuring Q-Tip) | Beastie Boys; Q-Tip | 4:05 |
| 8. | "Sabrosa" | Beastie Boys; Nishita; Bobo | 3:29 |
| 9. | "The Update" | Beastie Boys; Nishita; Caldato | 3:15 |
| 10. | "Futterman's Rule" | Beastie Boys; Nishita | 3:42 |
| 11. | "Alright Hear This" | Beastie Boys | 3:06 |
| 12. | "Eugene's Lament" | Beastie Boys; Nishita; Bobo; Eugene Gore | 2:12 |
| 13. | "Flute Loop" | Beastie Boys; Caldato | 1:54 |
| 14. | "Do It" (featuring Biz Markie) | Beastie Boys; Nishita; Caldato; Biz Markie | 3:16 |
| 15. | "Ricky's Theme" | Beastie Boys; Nishita; Bobo | 3:43 |
| 16. | "Heart Attack Man" | Beastie Boys; Smith | 2:14 |
| 17. | "The Scoop" | Beastie Boys; Caldato | 3:36 |
| 18. | "Shambala" | Beastie Boys; Nishita; Bobo | 3:40 |
| 19. | "Bodhisattva Vow" | Beastie Boys; Caldato | 3:08 |
| 20. | "Transitions" | Beastie Boys; Nishita | 2:31 |
| Total length: | | | 59:37 |

Japanese edition bonus tracks
| No. | Title | Length |
|---|---|---|
| 21. | "Dope Little Song" | 1:51 |
| 22. | "Resolution Time" | 2:49 |
| 23. | "Mullet Head" | 2:52 |
| 24. | "The Vibes" | 3:06 |

2009 Remastered Edition Bonus Disc
| No. | Title | Length |
|---|---|---|
| 1. | "Root Down" (Free Zone Mix) | 3:49 |
| 2. | "Resolution Time" | 2:49 |
| 3. | "Get It Together" (Buck-Wild Remix) | 4:18 |
| 4. | "Dope Little Song" | 1:50 |
| 5. | "Sure Shot" (European B-Boy Mix) | 2:59 |
| 6. | "Heart Attack Man" (Unplugged) | 2:22 |
| 7. | "The Vibes" | 3:07 |
| 8. | "Atwater Basketball Association File No. 172-C" | 1:27 |
| 9. | "Heart Attack Man" (Live) | 2:10 |
| 10. | "The Maestro" (Live) | 3:16 |
| 11. | "Mullet Head" | 2:53 |
| 12. | "Sure Shot" (European B-Boy Instrumental) | 2:58 |

== Personnel ==
- Beastie Boys – producers
  - Adam "Ad-Rock" Horovitz – vocals, guitar
  - Adam "MCA" Yauch – vocals, electric bass, double bass
  - Michael "Mike D" Diamond – vocals, drums
- Money Mark – keyboards, organ
- Eric Bobo – percussion; drums on "Ricky's Theme"
- Amery Smith – drums on "Tough Guy" & "Heart Attack Man"
- Eugene Gore – violin on "Eugene's Lament"
- Q-Tip – vocals on "Get It Together"
- Biz Markie – vocals on "Do It"
- Mario Caldato, Jr. – producer

== Charts ==
=== Weekly charts ===
Initial weekly chart performance for Ill Communication
| Chart (1994–95) | Peak position |
|---|---|
| Australian Albums (ARIA) | 8 |
| Austrian Albums (Ö3 Austria) | 10 |
| Canada Top Albums/CDs (RPM) | 8 |
| Dutch Albums (Album Top 100) | 31 |
| European Albums (European Top 100 Albums) | 11 |
| Finnish Albums (Suomen virallinen lista) | 19 |
| German Albums (Offizielle Top 100) | 11 |
| Hungarian Albums (MAHASZ) | 28 |
| New Zealand Albums (RMNZ) | 6 |
| Swedish Albums (Sverigetopplistan) | 7 |
| Swiss Albums (Schweizer Hitparade) | 12 |
| UK Albums (Official Charts) | 10 |
| US Billboard 200 | 1 |
| US Top R&B/Hip-Hop Albums (Billboard) | 2 |

=== Year-end charts ===
1994 year-end chart performance for Ill Communication
| Chart (1994) | Position |
|---|---|
| Canada Top Albums/CDs (RPM) | 37 |
| European Albums (European Top 100 Albums) | 61 |
| German Albums (Offizielle Top 100) | 32 |
| Swedish Albums (Sverigetopplistan) | 80 |
| Swiss Albums (Schweizer Hitparade) | 43 |
| US Billboard 200 | 63 |
| US Top R&B/Hip-Hop Albums (Billboard) | 60 |

1995 year-end chart performance for Ill Communication
| Chart (1995) | Position |
|---|---|
| US Billboard 200 | 186 |

== Certifications ==
Certifications and sales for Ill Communication
| Region | Certification | Certified units/sales |
|---|---|---|
| Canada (Music Canada) | 3× Platinum | 300,000^{^} |
| United Kingdom (BPI) | Gold | 100,000^{^} |
| United States (RIAA) | 3× Platinum | 3,000,000^{^} |
^{^} Shipments figures based on certification alone.

== See also ==
- List of Billboard 200 number-one albums of 1994
