= Mike D =

American hip-hop musician (born 1965)

- At Mutations Festival Brighton, UK, 24 October 2026

Background information
- Also known as: Mike Diamond; Country Mike; The King of Lunch; Meshach; Sweet Lou; Malibu Mike; Mike D 5D
- Born: Michael Louis Diamond; November 20, 1965 (age 61); Manhattan, New York City, U.S.
- Genres: Hip-hop; rap rock; hardcore punk; alternative hip-hop
- Occupations: Rapper; musician; songwriter; producer
- Instruments: Vocals; drums; percussion; keyboards
- Years active: 1979–present
- Formerly of: The Young Aborigines; Beastie Boys; The Latch Brothers
- Spouse: Tamra Davis (m. 1993, separated)

Signature
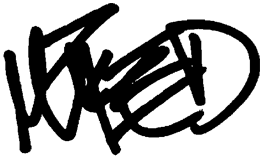

Michael Louis Diamond (born November 20, 1965), known professionally as Mike D, is an American rapper, musician, and music producer. He is a founding member of the hip-hop group Beastie Boys. In 2026, he began performing and releasing music solo with his new band Mike D 5D.

== Early life ==
Diamond was born on November 20, 1965 in Manhattan to a Jewish family, the youngest child of Harold Diamond, an art dealer, and Hester Diamond (née Klein), an interior designer. He had two older brothers, David and Stephen; the latter of whom died in 1999. Diamond's father died in 1982. His mother remarried twice, first to Ralph Kaminsky, an economics professor, followed by David S. Wilson, a psychoanalyst in 2015. He grew up on the Upper West Side surrounded by artwork, including pieces by Willem de Kooning, Mark Rothko, and Barnett Newman. He attended the arts-oriented Saint Ann's School and Walden School, as well as attending Vassar College for one semester.

== Career ==
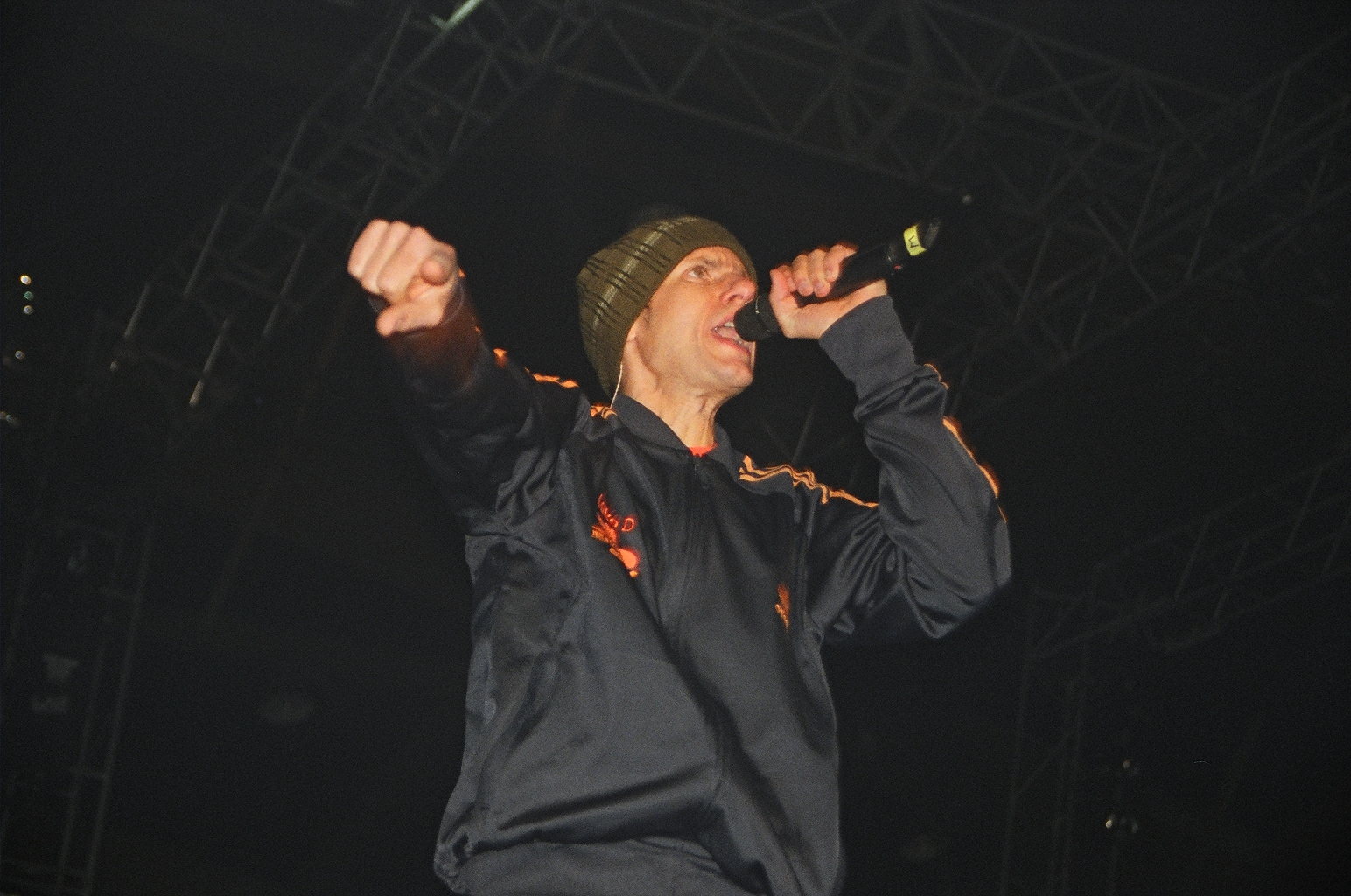
Mike D rapping with the Beastie Boys at Trans Musicales 2004 in Rennes

In 1979, Diamond co-founded the band the Young Aborigines. In 1981, Adam Yauch (known professionally as MCA), a friend and follower of the band, became their bass player, and on the suggestion of their then-guitar player, John Berry, the band changed their name to the Beastie Boys. By 1983, after John Berry exited, Adam Horovitz replaced him as the band's guitarist, performing under the name Ad-Rock. Their sound began to shift away from punk to hip-hop. Drummer Kate Schellenbach subsequently exited the group.

In 1986, the group's debut album Licensed to Ill was released on Def Jam Records and became a huge success. Though it spawned several singles, only one would reach the top twenty of the US Hot 100, the number 7 "(You Gotta) Fight for Your Right (To Party!)". Sales of Licensed to Ill were extremely strong, going multi-platinum during the time of its run. Several years later, it would be certified diamond status. The group would go on to release 7 more full-length and acclaimed studio albums, ultimately disbanding in 2012 after Yauch succumbed to cancer.

In 1992, Diamond had founded the Beastie Boys' now-defunct record label Grand Royal Records, under which he signed his former bandmate Schellenbach's band Luscious Jackson. He is interested in interior design, and designed Brooklyn-themed toile wallpaper; it was used in the renovation of Marquee New York in the city's Chelsea neighborhood, which reopened in January 2013.

A year after the death of Yauch and the dissolution of the Beastie Boys, Diamond told Rolling Stone he was "excited about making new stuff again" and released "Humberto Vs the New Reactionaries (Christine and the Queens Remix)" in July 2013. A remix of Yoko Ono Plastic Ono Band's "Bad Dancer" by Diamond and Adam Horovitz was streamed online in August 2013. The pair is credited with "additional beats, programming and other curve balls". In October 2014, Diamond stated that he had been working in the studio with American rock band Portugal. The Man as a producer. He has also produced English punk duo Soft Play's (formerly Slaves) second studio album, Take Control, which was released on September 30, 2016.

He released his debut solo single, "Switch Up", in May 2026. He hosts the Apple Music radio show The Echo Chamber. He released a second solo single "What We Got" later in May 2026. In June 2026, he released a third single, "True Colors" and announced his first solo album, Thank You. He is scheduled to embark on the Mike D 5D Tour in support of the album, beginning on August 30, 2026 in Boston and concluding on November 5, 2026 in Brussels. It is the first solo album released by any former Beastie Boys member since the band stopped performing after Yauch's death.

== Personal life ==
In 1993, Diamond married film, television and music video director Tamra Davis; they have since legally separated. They have two children, Davis Diamond and Skyler Diamond who formed the group Very Nice Person. They lived in Cobble Hill, Brooklyn. He grew up on Central Park West. He later lived in Brooklyn and Tribeca, and as of 2016 was living in Malibu, California. In an interview with Louis Theroux in 2026, Diamond revealed that he has a partner named Nadia.

== Selected discography ==
With the Beastie Boys

- Licensed to Ill (1986)
- Paul's Boutique (1989)
- Check Your Head (1992)
- Ill Communication (1994)
- Hello Nasty (1998)
- To the 5 Boroughs (2004)
- The Mix-Up (2007)
- Hot Sauce Committee Part Two (2011)

=== Solo ===
- Thank You (2026)
