= Brass monkey =

Brass monkey may refer to:

- Brass Monkey (band), an English folk band formed in 1982
- Brass Monkey (cocktail), an alcoholic drink
- Brass monkey (colloquialism), as used by many English speakers to indicate extremes, especially of cold temperature
- "Brass Monkey" (song), 1986, by the Beastie Boys
- Brass Monkeys, a 1984 Australian sitcom
- Brass Monkey (film), a 1948 feature film
- Brass Monkey Half Marathon, a race held near York, England
- Brass Monkey, karaoke dive bar and restaurant in Koreatown, Los Angeles

== Other ==
- Brass statue of the three wise monkeys
