= Brass monkey (colloquialism) =

Colloquial expression for cold weather

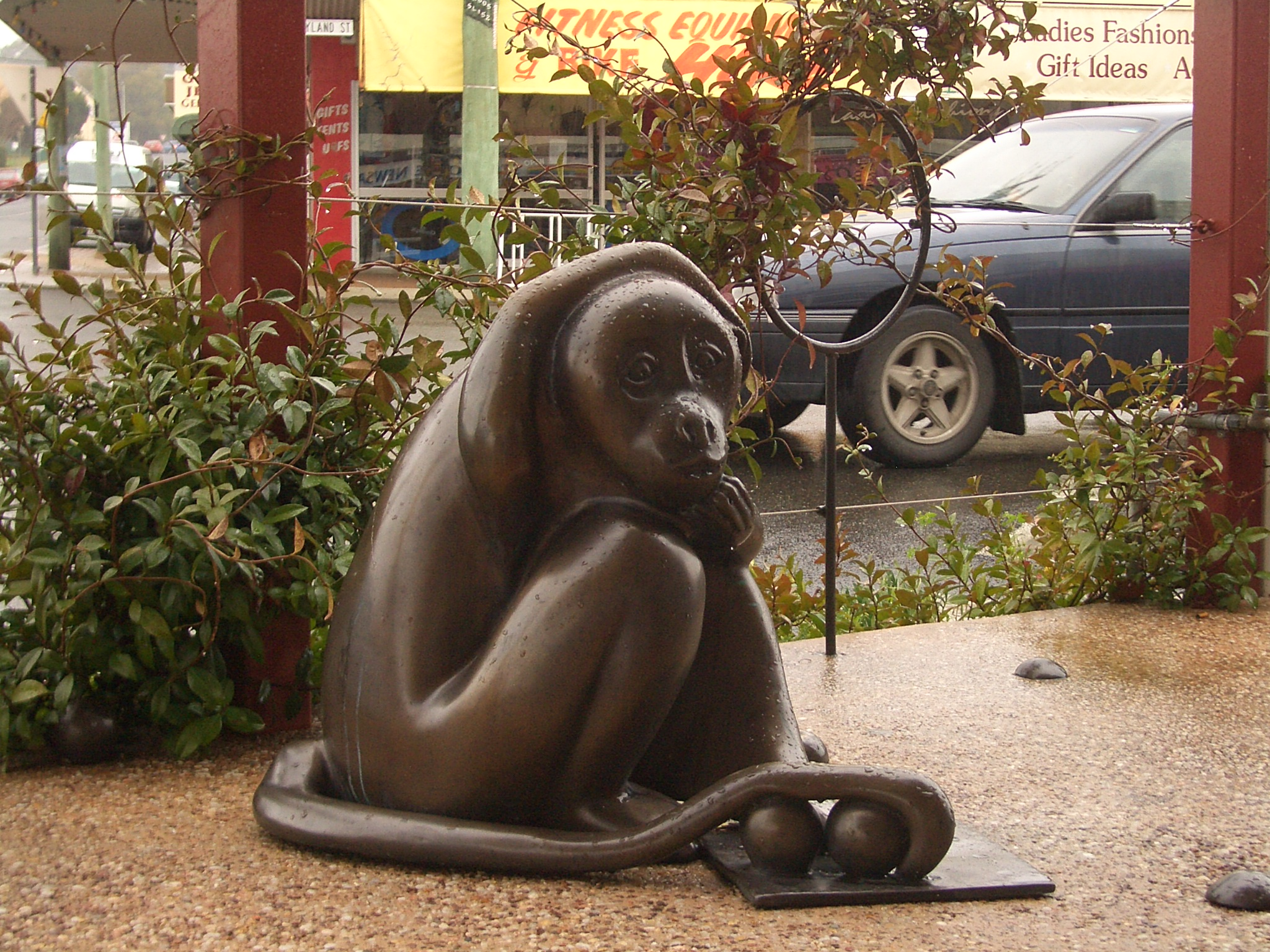
The Brass Monkey of Stanthorpe, Queensland, a place known for its "brass monkey weather", complete with a set of balls

"Cold enough to freeze the balls off (or on) a brass monkey" is a colloquial expression used by some English speakers to describe extremely cold weather. In New Zealand, the phrase is often shortened to “brass monkey weather,” used colloquially to describe extremely cold conditions.

The reference to the testes (as the term balls is commonly understood to mean) of the brass monkey appears to be a 20th-century variant on the expression, prefigured by a range of references to other body parts, especially the nose and tail.

== History ==
During the 19th and 20th centuries, small monkeys cast from the alloy brass were very common tourist souvenirs from China and Japan. They usually, but not always, came in a set of three representing the Three Wise Monkeys carved in wood above the Shrine of Tōshō-gū in Nikkō, Tochigi, Japan. These monkeys were often cast with all three in a single piece. In other sets they were made singly. Old brass monkeys of this type are collector's items. Michael Quinion, advisor to The Oxford English Dictionary and author of the website World Wide Words, writes, "it's more than likely the term came from them".

== Usage ==
Early references to "brass monkeys" in the 19th century have no references to balls at all, but instead variously say that it is cold enough to freeze the tail, nose, ears, and whiskers off a brass monkey; or hot enough to "scald the throat" or "singe the hair" of a brass monkey.

- An early known recorded use of the phrase "brass monkey" appears in the humorous essay "On Enjoying Life" by Eldridge Gerry Paige (writing under the pseudonym Dow, Jr.), published in the New York Sunday Mercury and republished in the book Short Patent Sermons by Dow, Jr.: "When you love, [...] your heart, hands, feet and flesh are as cold and senseless as the toes of a brass monkey in winter."
- Another early published instance of the phrase appeared in 1847, in a portion of Herman Melville's autobiographical narrative Omoo:

"It was so excessively hot in this still, brooding valley, shut out from the Trades, and only open toward the leeward side of the island, that labor in the sun was out of the question. To use a hyperbolical phrase of Shorty's, 'It was 'ot enough to melt the nose h'off a brass monkey.'"

- An early recorded mentioning of the freezing a "brass monkey" dates from 1857, appearing in C.A. Abbey, Before the Mast, p. 108: "It would freeze the tail off a brass monkey".
- The story "Henry Gardner" (10 April 1858) has "its blowing hard enough to blow the nose off a brass monkey".
- The poem "Lines on a heavy prospector and his recent doings in the North-West" (20 June 1865) has "It would freeze off a brass monkey's nose"
- The article "Echoes from England" (23 May 1868) has "that same east wind ... would shave the whiskers off a brass monkey"
- The Story of Waitstill Baxter, by Kate Douglas Wiggin (1913) has "The little feller, now, is smart's a whip, an' could talk the tail off a brass monkey".
- The Ivory Trail, by Talbot Mundy (1919) has "He has the gall of a brass monkey".
- Brass Monkey, a 1948 British comedy thriller film starring Carroll Levis, Carole Landis and Herbert Lom.
- In Yogi Yorgesson's 1949 Christmas novelty parody song, "Yingle Bells", the last lyric says "I wouldn't make brass monkeys ride in a one-horse open sleigh".
- An episode of the TV series M*A*S*H features a cold snap for the camp, during which Lt Col Henry Blake jokes "we better keep the brass monkeys in tonight."

=== Cunard ===
The "brass monkey" is the nickname of the house flag of the Cunard Line, adopted in 1878, a lion rampant or on a field gules holding a globe. The reference is almost certainly irreverent humour, rather than a source of the expression, of which variants predate it.

=== Beverage ===
A "brass monkey" is one of any number of citrus-flavored alcoholic drinks. In 1986, the hip hop band the Beastie Boys released a single called "Brass Monkey" from their album Licensed to Ill, although the song's lyrics are focused on the cocktail of the same name.

=== Inventions ===
US Patent 4634021 (1987) describes:

A release mechanism is disclosed for releasing an object such as a ball from a body under the force of gravity. A bimetallic element obstructs or opens an opening in the body for retaining or releasing the object depending upon the temperature of the bimetallic element. The release mechanism may be incorporated into a novelty "brass monkey" for "emasculating" the monkey when the temperature decreases to a predetermined temperature at which the balls in the "brass monkey" are permitted to drop to a base which is designed to produce an audible sound when struck by the balls.

== Supposed etymology ==
It is often stated that the phrase originated from the use of a brass tray, called a "monkey", to hold cannonballs on warships in the 16th to 18th centuries. Supposedly, in very cold temperatures the "monkey" would contract, causing the balls to fall off. However, nearly all historians and etymologists consider this story to be a myth. This story has been discredited by the U.S. Department of the Navy, etymologist Michael Quinion, and the Oxford English Dictionary (OED).

They give five main reasons:

1. The OED does not record the term "monkey" or "brass monkey" being used in this way.
2. The purported method of storage of cannonballs ("round shot") is simply false. The shot was not stored on deck continuously on the off-chance that the ship might go into battle. Indeed, decks were kept as clear as possible.
3. Furthermore, such a method of storage would result in shot rolling around on deck and causing a hazard in high seas. The shot was stored on the gun or spar decks, in shot racks—wooden planks with holes bored into them, known as shot garlands in the Royal Navy, into which round shot was inserted for ready use by gunners.
4. Shots were not left exposed to the elements where they could rust. Such rust could lead to the ball not flying true or jamming in the barrel and causing the cannon to explode. Indeed, gunners would attempt to remove as many imperfections as possible from the surfaces of balls.
5. The physics does not stand up to scrutiny. The contraction of both balls and plate over the range of temperatures involved would not be particularly large. The effect claimed could be reproduced under laboratory conditions with objects engineered to a high precision for this purpose, but it is unlikely it would ever have occurred in real life aboard a warship.

The phrase is most likely just a humorous reference to emphasize how cold it is.

== Sources ==
- Oxford University Press. "binnacle". The Oxford Companion to Ships and the Sea.
- Roget, Peter Mark. "monkey". Roget's Thesaurus (1911). Archived from the original on May 20, 2009.
  - Beavis, Bill (1994). Salty Dog Talk: The Nautical Origins of Everyday Expressions. New York: Sheridan House. ISBN 0-924486-82-1.
  - Isil, Olivia A. (1996). When a Loose Cannon Flogs a Dead Horse, There's the Devil to Pay. Camden, Maine: International Marine. ISBN 0-07-032877-3. Pages 23–24
  - King, Dean (1995). A Sea of Words. New York: Henry Holt. ISBN 0-8050-3816-7.
  - The Compact Oxford English Dictionary. Oxford: Clarendon Press. 1993. ISBN 0-19-861258-3.
- "The Brass Monkey Motorcycle Rally".
- "Brass Monkeys". The Phrase Finder. itself citing
  - Cassidy, Frederick G.; Houston Hall, Joan, eds. (1996). Dictionary of American Regional English. Vol. 3. Cambridge, Massachusetts: Harvard University Press. p. 642.
  - Granville, Wilfred (1962). A Dictionary of Sailors' Slang. London: Andre Deutch. p. 77.
  - Kemp, Peter, ed. (1976). Oxford Companion to Ships & the Sea. New York: Oxford University; Press. p. 556.
  - The Oxford English Dictionary. New York: Oxford University Press. 1933.
  - Partridge, Eric. A Dictionary of Slang and Unconventional English (8th ed.). New York: Macmillan Publishing Company. p. 917.
  - Longridge, C. Nepean (1981). The Anatomy of Nelson's Ships. Annapolis, Maryland: Naval Institute Press. p. 64.
  - The Visual Dictionary of Ships and Sailing. New York: Dorling Kindersley. 1991. p. 17.
