= The Young and the Useless =

American punk band

The Young and the Useless were an American punk band formed in the early 1980s that consisted of Adam Trese, Arthur Africano, David Scilken and future Beastie Boys member Adam Horovitz. They were managed by former Beastie Boys manager Nick Cooper. Their first recording Real Men Don't Floss was released by Ratcage Records. It is rumoured that they recorded a second album, but it was never released and its whereabouts is unknown. They played shows in New York City clubs including: A7, CBGB, Rock Lounge, Mudd Club, Club 57, Rock Hotel and 2+2; and played with Bad Brains, The Stimulators, Dead Kennedys, Ramones, P.I.L., Hüsker Dü, the Mob, the Necros, Adrenalin O.D. and the Beastie Boys.

On Friday, November 13, 1982, The Young and the Useless opened for the Beastie Boys at a concert produced by Philip Pucci, in honor of his birthday for the purposes of his short concert film of the Beastie Boys, Beastie. Pucci held the concert in Bard College's Preston Drama Dance Department Theatre. This performance marked both The Young and the Useless' and the Beastie Boys' first on screen appearance in a published motion picture, although the segment including The Young and the Useless was not included in the film's final edit.

By late 1984, due to the local success of Beastie Boys' 12" single, "Cooky Puss", the group had fallen apart, as Adam Horovitz began to spend more of his time working with The Beastie Boys. On October 28, 1984, they played their final gig at Club CBGB in New York City.

== Real Men Don't Floss ==
Real Men Don't Floss was their only official recording, released on Rat Cage in 1982. All tracks written by The Young and The Useless except "Funky Music" which is a loose cover of "Play That Funky Music" by Wild Cherry.

No.	Title	Length
1.	"Young and Useless"	0:56
2.	"P.M.H."	0:40
3.	"The Wave"	1:10
4.	"Home Boy"	0:57
5.	"Rise and Shine"	1:53
6.	"Funky Music"	2:00
