= Paul Revere (song) =

Single by Beastie Boys

from the album Licensed to Ill
- Released: 1986
- Recorded: Spring 1986
- Genre: Hardcore hip-hop
- Length: 3:41
- Label: Def Jam/Columbia
- Songwriters: Adam Horovitz, Joseph Simmons, Darryl McDaniels, Rick Rubin
- Producers: Rick Rubin, Beastie Boys

Beastie Boys singles chronology
"Hold It Now, Hit It" (1986)	"Paul Revere" (1986)	"The New Style" (1986)

"Paul Revere" is a song by American hip-hop group Beastie Boys, released as the third single from their debut album Licensed to Ill (1986). It was written by Adam Horovitz, Joseph Simmons, Darryl McDaniels, and Rick Rubin. It was produced by Rick Rubin and the Beastie Boys. The song tells a fictional story of how the Beastie Boys met.

Adam Horovitz told how the song evolved from an incident when the Beastie Boys were waiting outside a recording studio for Run-D.M.C., when Joseph Simmons ("Run") suddenly came running down the street screaming incoherently. When he reached the Beastie Boys, he said "Here's a little story I got to tell...". After much confusion, Simmons stated "THAT's the song". The band worked on it from there.

== Recording ==
Mike D remembered how the group played around with an 808 drum machine during the Ill sessions and Adam Yauch asked what the tracks would sound like if the beats were played backwards. “Run from Run-D.M.C. was there, and he was like, ’Man, this is crazy.’ But Yauch recorded this beat, bounced it to another tape, flipped it around — this is pre-digital sampling — and bounced it back to the multi-track tape,” he said. “The reversed beat basically became ’Paul Revere.’ Yauch saw this thing we couldn't see — and he killed it.”

== Content ==
The song tells a fictional story of how Ad-Rock, Mike D, and MCA first met. Ad-Rock describes riding through the desert on a horse named Paul Revere, also the name of a horse in the musical Guys and Dolls, while he is on the run from the police. He runs into MCA, who asks him for a drink. When Ad-Rock refuses, MCA pulls a gun on him and says, "You got two choices of what you can do...I can blow you away or you can ride with me." Ad-Rock agrees, saying that he'll go if they can get to the border because "The sheriff's after me for what I did to his daughter".

The two ride to a bar and sit down next to Mike D, who tells them he's planning to rob the place. He then pulls out his guns and shoots them in the air, telling the people in the bar, "Your cash and your jewelry is what I expect!" MCA and Ad-Rock help Mike D escape with the money and jewelry, first causing a distraction and then helping him carry the stolen goods out, along with "Two girlies and a beer that's cold".

Whether intentionally or coincidentally, the meter of Paul Revere reflects that of the poem, "Paul Revere's Ride," by Longfellow.. Their opening lines are also similar, as the Longfellow poem begins, "Listen, my children, and you shall hear".

== Charts ==
Chart (1986)	Peak position
U.S. Billboard Hot Dance Club Play	41
U.S. Billboard Hot R&B/Hip-Hop Songs	34

== Legacy and covers ==
Lyrics from the song are referenced and sampled in several rap songs by other artists. Cypress Hill did a cover of the song called "Busted in the Hood" on their album Till Death Do Us Part, with the lyrics changed to be about getting arrested for drug-dealing.

The ending lines were interpolated by Eminem on the song "Bad Guys Always Die" with Dr. Dre from the Wild Wild West soundtrack. The song was re-released on the expanded edition of The Slim Shady LP.

It was covered by Justin Timberlake and Jimmy Fallon on Late Night with Jimmy Fallon as part of their "History of Rap" medley.

N.W.A liked the song so much that they used to perform it with dirty lyrics early in their career, according to Ice Cube.

Rick Ross' single "The Boss" sampled the song's percussion.
