= Girls (Beastie Boys song) =

Single by Beastie Boys

from the album Licensed to Ill
- B-side: "She's Crafty"
- Released: May 6, 1987
- Recorded: 1986
- Genre: Comedy hip-hop
- Length: 2:14
- Label: Def Jam, Columbia
- Songwriters: Beastie Boys, Rick Rubin
- Producer: Rick Rubin

Beastie Boys singles chronology
"No Sleep till Brooklyn" (1987)	"Girls" (1987)	"Hey Ladies" (1989)

"Girls" is a song by American rap rock group the Beastie Boys, released in 1987 as the seventh and final single from their debut album Licensed to Ill.

== Song structure and lyrics ==
The song is the shortest on the album, lasting just over two minutes long.

Lyrically, the song talks about the narrator (Ad-Rock)'s desire for women. He recalls an experience from two years before with a woman who had an interest in the narrator's bandmate MCA. MCA did not share her feelings and permitted the narrator to pursue her romantically. Ad-Rock takes the woman for a walk near a bay and asks her out but she rejects his proposal. She moves to a far away location but in the present day the narrator sees her back in town showing interest in his other bandmate, Mike D.

The arrangement is supplied by a drum machine beat and a simple melody on an electronic keyboard. Mike D and MCA provide wordless backing vocals reminiscent of doo wop that occasionally break into giggles at the song's lyrics and Ad-Rock's exaggerated delivery.

== GoldieBlox cover ==
In 2013, the toy company GoldieBlox used the song with alternative lyrics in a video of a Rube Goldberg machine made primarily out of traditional girls' toys. The group accused the company of copyright infringement, and stated that Adam Yauch's last will prevented the use of their music in advertising. In November 2013, GoldieBlox countersued the Beastie Boys and producer Rick Rubin, saying the use of the song was a parody. The advertising video, which had received more than 8 million views, was also pulled off from YouTube. In March 2014, the Beastie Boys settled out of court, with GoldieBlox issuing a public apology and agreeing to pay $1 million for the settlement, in the form of a donation to a charity of the band's choice.

== Charts ==
Chart (1987)	Peak position
New Zealand Singles Chart	27
UK Singles Chart	34
