= In a World Gone Mad =

Song by Beastie Boys
- Released: March 2003
- Genre: Hip hop, political hip hop
- Length: 3:27
- Songwriters: Michael Diamond, Adam Horovitz, Adam Yauch

"In a World Gone Mad" is an anti-war protest song released by the Beastie Boys. It was made available in March 2003 on the band's website in MP3 format as a free download.

== Background and lyrics ==
In an interview Heeb magazine, Mike D said that the song was created soon after September 11th, which occupied their minds; they became serious and "needed to get out".

In its lyrics it directly references the war on terror and war on Iraq as well as political figures George W. Bush and Saddam Hussein.

== Critical reception ==
The song was named the #26 "50 Worst Songs of the '00s" in a 2009 Village Voice article.

== See also ==
List of anti-war songs
