= The New Style (song) =

Single by Beastie Boys

from the album Licensed to Ill
- Released: November 6, 1986
- Recorded: 1986
- Studio: Rick Rubin Recording Studio
- Genre: Hip-hop; rap rock
- Length: 4:36
- Label: Def Jam
- Songwriters: Beastie Boys; Rick Rubin
- Producer: Rick Rubin

Beastie Boys singles chronology
| "Paul Revere" (1986) | "The New Style" (1986) | "(You Gotta) Fight for Your Right (To Party!)" (1986) |

"The New Style" (also known as "It's the New Style") is a song by American rap rock group the Beastie Boys, released as the third single from their debut album, Licensed to Ill, on November 6, 1986.

Stevie Chick of The Guardian ranked "The New Style" as the Beastie Boys' eleventh-best song, saying that it "still sounds like the future".

The song was prominently sampled in The Pharcyde's 1995 song "Drop", the music video for which contains cameos from Beastie Boys members Mike D and Ad-Rock. The song was produced by J Dilla, who also sampled "The New Style" on multiple songs on his 2006 album Donuts. "The New Style" was also sampled by the Beastie Boys themselves on their 1998 song "Intergalactic".

== Charts ==
| Chart (1986) | Peak position |
|---|---|
| U.S. Billboard Hot Black Singles | 22 |
| U.S. Billboard Hot Dance Music/Maxi-Singles Sales | 20 |
| U.S. Billboard Hot Dance Club Play | 41 |
