= No Sleep till Brooklyn =

1987 single by Beastie Boys

Single by Beastie Boys

from the album Licensed to Ill
- B-side: "Posse in Effect"
- Released: March 1, 1987
- Recorded: Spring 1986
- Genre: Rap rock; hard rock; heavy metal; rap metal
- Length: 4:09
- Label: Def Jam; Columbia
- Songwriters: Rick Rubin; Michael Diamond; Adam Horovitz; Adam Yauch
- Producer: Rick Rubin

Beastie Boys singles chronology
"Brass Monkey" (1987)	"No Sleep till Brooklyn" (1987)	"Girls" (1987)

Music video
- "No Sleep till Brooklyn" on YouTube

"No Sleep till Brooklyn" is a song by the New York hip-hop group the Beastie Boys, and the sixth single from their debut studio album, Licensed to Ill. One of their signature songs, it describes an exhaustive tour and all the events that make it tiresome, but also emphasizes their determination not to rest until they reach their home base of Brooklyn. "No Sleep till Brooklyn" was a popular concert favorite for the Beastie Boys and traditionally used as their closing song. Among other references to heavy metal, the title is a play on the Motörhead album No Sleep 'til Hammersmith. The song has been subject to several covers and parodies including "Stutter Rap (No Sleep til Bedtime)" by Morris Minor and the Majors.

Cash Box called it "a raucous, rambunctious blend of rap, smart-ass and heavy metal."

== Production and play ==
Rick Rubin played the guitar riffs. Kerry King, guitarist for Slayer, played the solo; Slayer had released an album produced by Rubin earlier in 1986 (Reign in Blood). More metal commentary and adaptation is added by the video, directed by Ric Menello, as a parody of glam metal.

Later in their career, the Beastie Boys continued to perform the song live, although with altered lyrics to downplay their early party-boy reputation. "M.C.A.'s in the back because he's skeezin' with a whore," was changed to "M.C.A.'s in the back with the mahjong board", and "Autographed pictures and classy hoes" was changed to "Autographed pictures to nobody knows."

The song features one of many homages to New York City's boroughs, and has been described as "joyful ranting".

Bob Dylan played the song on the "New York" episode of Season 1 of his Theme Time Radio Hour show in 2007, noting the Beastie Boys were not merely a "flash in the pan" in his introduction.

== Music video ==
The music video for "No Sleep till Brooklyn" was co-directed by Ric Menello and Adam Dubin. Menello and Dubin also directed the video for the Beastie Boys' preceding single, "(You Gotta) Fight for Your Right (To Party!)" Kerry King, who plays guitar on this track, also appears in the video. Ruth Collins, an actress best known for 1980s B-movie horrors, is the lead dancer, and actor Vic Noto is an outlaw biker.

== In popular culture ==
"No Sleep till Brooklyn" appears in the 1991 film Out For Justice, 2008 video game Guitar Hero World Tour, the 2016 film The Secret Life of Pets and the 2023 films The Super Mario Bros. Movie and Guardians of the Galaxy Vol. 3; the song is also included on the latter's soundtrack album. It is also featured in the 5th season of the television series Brooklyn Nine-Nine. It is played as a montage in Family Guy Season 15, episode 15 “Cop and a Half-wit”.

== Charts ==
Chart (1987)	Peak position
Belgium (Ultratop 50 Flanders)	28
Netherlands (Dutch Top 40)	22
Netherlands (GfK Dutch Chart)	23
Germany (Media Control Charts)	46
Ireland Irish Singles Chart	17
UK (Official Charts Company)	14

== Certifications ==
Region	Certification	Certified units/sales
United Kingdom (BPI)	Silver	200,000^{‡}
^{‡} Sales+streaming figures based on certification alone.
