= The New Style =

The New Style may refer to the following:

- Naughty by Nature, originally known as the New Style
- "The New Style" (song), 1986 single by the hip-hop group Beastie Boys

== See also ==
- Old Style and New Style dates
