= Brass Monkey Motorcycle Rally (Australia) =

The Brass Monkey Motorcycle Rally is an annual motorcycle rally held in Australia by the Bikers Australia club since 1985.

== See also ==
- Brass monkey (colloquialism)
