= Polly Wog Stew =

EP by Beastie Boys
- Released: July 1982
- Recorded: 1982
- Studios: 171-A Studios, New York City
- Genre: Hardcore punk
- Length: 10:42
- Label: Rat Cage
- Producers: Scott Jarvis, Beastie Boys

Beastie Boys chronology
Polly Wog Stew (1982)	Licensed to Ill (1986)

Polly Wog Stew is the first recorded release by Beastie Boys, released as an EP in 1982 on the independent record label Rat Cage. Now out of print in its original form, all eight songs saw reissue on the 1989 punk rock compilation Killed by Death #1 but were removed from the record's subsequent releases when the band repackaged the entire EP, along with the Cooky Puss 12", as the compilation album Some Old Bullshit.

Professional ratings
Review scores
Source	Rating
AllMusic	3/5 stars
RapReviews	3/10

== Track listing ==
All tracks composed by Beastie Boys (Adam Yauch, John Berry, Kate Schellenbach, Michael Diamond).

No.	Title	Length
1.	"Beastie Boys"	0:56
2.	"Transit Cop"	1:18
3.	"Jimi"	2:06
4.	"Holy Snappers"	1:22
5.	"Riot Fight"	0:30
6.	"Ode To…"	1:33
7.	"Michelle's Farm"	1:38
8.	"Egg Raid On Mojo"	1:20
Total length:		10:43

== Track information ==
=== "Egg Raid On Mojo" ===
This is one of the few hardcore punk songs that the band continued to play in later years. Liner notes from the anthology The Sounds of Science state that the song is based on an event where members of the band were denied entry to a club by a bouncer, later returning, dressed in black, to pelt the offender with eggs. Some of the lyrics, such as "We dressed all in black" were reused in the Paul's Boutique song "Egg Man".

The Some Old Bullshit compilation includes an alternate version taped from Tim Sommer's Noise The Show radio program. Two tracks from Polly Wog Stew also appeared on the 1982 ROIR cassette compilation New York Thrash.

== Personnel ==
=== Beastie Boys ===
- John Berry – guitar
- Michael Diamond – lead vocals, cowbell
- Kate Schellenbach – drums, backing vocals, washboard
- Adam Yauch – bass guitar, backing vocals, acoustic guitar

=== Additional personnel ===
- Donna Parsons, Dave Scilken, Dave-id Busaras, Nick Cooper – backing vocals
