= Tougher Than Leather (film) =

1988 film directed by Rick Rubin

- Movie poster
- Directed by: Rick Rubin
- Written by: Rick Rubin; Ric Menello
- Produced by: Vincent Giordano
- Starring: Run-D.M.C.; Richard Edson; Jenny Lumet; The Beastie Boys
- Music by: Run–D.M.C. Beastie Boys; Public Enemy
- Production companies: Def American Pictures; New Line Cinema
- Distributed by: New Line Cinema
- Release date: September 16, 1988 (NYC)
- Running time: 92 minutes
- Country: United States
- Language: English
- Box office: $3,546,846

Tougher Than Leather is an American musical action film released in 1988 and distributed by New Line Cinema. The film was directed by Rick Rubin and stars the hip-hop superstars Run–D.M.C.. They created the film to coincide with the release of their fourth studio album that was also titled Tougher Than Leather.

== Plot ==
At the beginning of the film, D.M.C. is released from prison, at which time he returns to New York City with his band-mates, Run and Jam Master Jay. They are ready to schedule some gigs and continue their musical careers when things take a dark turn. Their friend Runny Ray, played by Raymond White, has been murdered by Vic Ferrante (Rick Rubin). This pulls the group into a seedy world of crime and violence.

Vic and the one of his henchmen cover up the murder to look like Ray was killed due to a drug deal gone wrong. As the band members attempt to determine who is really responsible for the murder, their own lives become endangered. They take matters into extremities all the while trying to find Ray's killer. The action is of a very well balanced style with a series of musical performances by Run-D.M.C. and also by other 1980s hip-hop and go-go superstars such as Beastie Boys, Slick Rick and Junk Yard Band.

== Cast ==
- Joseph Simmons as Run. (Himself)
- Darryl McDaniels as D.M.C.. (Himself)
- Jason Mizell as Jam Master Jay. (Himself)
- Wendell Fite as DJ Hurricane. (Himself)
- William Drayton Jr. as Flavor Flav. (Himself)
- Richard Walters as Slick Rick. (Himself)
- Richard Edson as Bernie Carteez.
- Rick Rubin as Vic Ferrante.
- Ric Menello as Arthur Ratnor.
- Jenny Lumet as Pam.
- Adam Yauch as MCA. (Himself)
- Adam Horovitz as King Ad-Rock. (Himself)
- Michael Diamond as Mike D. (Himself)
- Samuel Citrin as Sam Sever. (Himself)
- Raymond White as Runny Ray. (Himself)
- Mickey Rubin as Marty Ferrante.
- Lois Ayres as Charlotte Hopper.
- George Godfrey as Nathan Burdette.
- Vic Noto as The Bartender From Tom Milano Bar & Grill.
- Daniel Simmons as The Prison Warden.
- Junk Yard Band as Themselves.
- Russell Simmons as Himself.
- James Drescher as Himself. (Uncredited Cameo)
- Glenn Danzig as Himself. (Uncredited Cameo)
- Tom Araya as Himself. (Uncredited Cameo)
- Kerry King as Himself. (Uncredited Cameo)
- Jeff Hanneman as Himself. (Uncredited Cameo)
- Dave Lombardo as Himself. (Uncredited Cameo)
- Kara Vallow as Herself. (Uncredited Cameo)

== Critical reaction and release ==
While the music usually garners a favorable response, critics generally panned the film. According to The Washington Post, the film is "vile, vicious, despicable, stupid, sexist, racist and horrendously made." It was also described as "poorly executed and exploitative fare." It carried a 43% rating at Rotten Tomatoes.

The film failed at the box office, but it was released on VHS Video Cassette in 1989 and rereleased in 1997. The VHS Video Cassette version features two edits in the film that were not included in its original theatrical presentation. This physical media version has now since completely gone out of print entirely. In 2004, a fullscreen remastered version of the film was released in Thailand on DVD-R with some dialogue newly edited out as well as the original two edits in the film from the VHS Video Cassette as an officially authorized release. This physical media version has also now since completely gone out of print entirely.

== Connections to Blaxploitation ==
In response to the negative reactions to the film, critics like Randall Clark have pointed out the many connections between the release and the history of the "Blaxploitation" genre. Much like earlier films such as Shaft and Black Samson, the plot features inner-city anti-heroes who need to take the law into their own hands as they have been neglected by the more traditional avenues of justice.

== See also ==
- List of hood films
