= Some Old Bullshit =

1994 compilation album by Beastie Boys

Compilation album by Beastie Boys
- Released: February 8, 1994
- Recorded: 1980–1983
- Genre: Hardcore punk; comedy hip-hop
- Length: 27:54
- Label: Capitol
- Producer: Beastie Boys

Beastie Boys chronology
Check Your Head (1992)	Some Old Bullshit (1994)	Ill Communication (1994)

Professional ratings
Review scores
Source	Rating
AllMusic	2/5 stars
Christgau’s Consumer Guide	(neither)
Entertainment Weekly	B−
Rolling Stone	4/5 stars

Some Old Bullshit is a compilation album by the rap rock trio The Beastie Boys, released on February 8, 1994. It compiles several of their early EPs, recorded in the early 1980s. These recordings present a sound radically different from that of the hip-hop sound generally associated with the band. Instead, these songs represent the band's part in the early New York hardcore scene. The album also features taped segments originally heard on Noise The Show, a popular hardcore radio show on WNYU in New York that played early recordings from Beastie Boys. These segments feature the hyperbolic introductions of Noise The Show's host, Tim Sommer, an early supporter of the band.

== Track listing ==
No.	Title	Length
1.	"Egg Raid on Mojo" (Demo Version)	1:41
2.	"Beastie Boys"	0:56
3.	"Transit Cop"	1:18
4.	"Jimi"	2:06
5.	"Holy Snappers"	1:22
6.	"Riot Fight"	0:30
7.	"Ode to..."	1:33
8.	"Michelle's Farm"	1:38
9.	"Egg Raid on Mojo"	1:20
10.	"Transit Cop" (Demo Version)	1:21
11.	"Cooky Puss"	3:19
12.	"Bonus Batter"	2:21
13.	"Beastie Revolution"	5:09
14.	"Cooky Puss" (Censored Version)	3:19

== Song origins ==
- Tracks 1 and 10 were taped from Tim Sommer's Noise The Show radio program.
- Tracks 2–9 are from the Polly Wog Stew EP.
- Tracks 11–14 are from the Cooky Puss single.
