= BS 2000 =

American musical group

- Also known as: Beat Science 2000
- Genres: Hip hop; Sound collage, Lo-fi (early)
- Years active: 1997–2002
- Label: Grand Royal
- Spinoff of: Beastie Boys; Suicidal Tendencies
- Past members: Ad-Rock; Amery Smith

BS 2000 (also known as Beat Science 2000) was an American rock and hip hop group formed by Adam "Ad-Rock" Horovitz (member of Beastie Boys) and Amery "AWOL" Smith (drummer for Suicidal Tendencies and touring drummer for Beastie Boys) featuring Janay North. Their music features short instrumentals fusing hip-hop and electronic effects. Music on this album was inspired by the French underground band X-Ray Pop.

In 1997, BS 2000 released their vinyl-only self-titled debut. BS 2000 later released a limited-edition vinyl/CD, "Buddy", in 2000 and Simply Mortified on vinyl and CD in 2001.

A remix of their song "The Scrappy" (remixed by the Latch Brothers) was featured in the Xbox video game, Jet Set Radio Future.

== Discography ==
=== Studio albums ===
- BS 2000 (1997)
- Simply Mortified (2000)

=== Singles ===
- "The Scrappy" (2000)
- "Buddy" (2000)
- "Beach Blanket Boggle Boogie" (2000)
- "It Feels Like" (2001)
