= Ric Menello =

American filmmaker and screenwriter (1952–2013)

- Born: Richard Menello; August 20, 1952; Brooklyn, New York City, U.S.
- Died: March 1, 2013 (aged 60); Ditmas Park, Brooklyn, New York City, U.S
- Occupations: Filmmaker; screenwriter

Richard "Ric" Menello (August 20, 1952 – March 1, 2013) was an American filmmaker and screenwriter. Menello co-directed the landmark music video for the Beastie Boys' 1987 single, "(You Gotta) Fight for Your Right (To Party!)". His contributions to music during the era led MTV to call him, "one of the most influential visionaries behind the emergence of commercial hip-hop in the 1980s."

Menello's screenwriting credits include the 1988 Run–D.M.C. film, Tougher Than Leather, directed by Rick Rubin, and two films co-written with and directed by James Gray, Two Lovers (2008), starring Gwyneth Paltrow and Joaquin Phoenix, and The Immigrant, (2013), starring Marion Cotillard and Joaquin Phoenix.

== Biography ==
Menello was raised in Brooklyn, New York. He earned a bachelor's degree in dramatic literature and cinema from New York University. He continued to take graduate courses in cinema studies at NYU after completing his bachelor's. Menello started writing film criticism in college for the NYU Journal and the Arts and Humor magazine Cold Duck, and his articles appeared in Film Comment, Photon and Blood Times. He later became a regular contributor to European Trash Cinema, where he critiqued Italian and French genre films. One of those early articles, "Dark Universe: The World of Dario Argento" (Photon July 1975) is cited in Maitland McDonagh's book Broken Mirrors, Broken Minds: The Dark Dreams of Dario Argento.

Wishing to broaden his experiences in the Arts, Menello acted onstage in such Off and Off-Off Broadway groups as Theater At Riverside Church, Program in Educational Theater and Sammarkind Players. He appeared in productions of Romeo And Juliet, She Stoops to Conquer, Guys And Dolls, The Miracle Worker, Wind In The Willows and Bell, Book & Candle.

At NYU, he studied acting with and assisted the legendary filmmaker Nicholas Ray, director of Rebel Without a Cause. He continued to act in many of his music videos and in the feature films Tougher Than Leather and Drop Dead Rock (both of which he co-wrote). He and critic Dan Yakir contributed full-length audio commentary for the DVD release of the late Claude Chabrol's Pleasure Party (Une Partie de Plaisir), as well for Chabrol's Cry of the Owl (Le Cri du Hibou). He maintained a long distance relationship for years with Chabrol, writing to him at length to discuss his many films. Chabrol gifted Menello with his own autographed, personally notated script for his film L'Enfer (Hell). Menello researched the life of the late director Jean-Pierre Melville, that included correspondence with Pierre Lesou, Philippe Labro and Bertrand Tavernier among others. Menello received a special thanks in the acknowledgement section of Ginette Vincendeau's book Jean Pierre Melville: An American in Paris, further sharing his views on Melville with many fellow writers and cinephiles.

During the 1980s, Menello was employed as a part-time desk clerk at Weinstein dormitory at New York University (NYU) while simultaneously attending graduate school at NYU. Menello met record producer Rick Rubin, the founder of Def Jam Recordings, while Rubin was living in the same NYU dorm. He also first met the Beastie Boys while working at NYU. Writer Dan Charnas, author of The Big Payback: The History of the Business of Hip-Hop, credited Menello with forming much of Rubin's musical style and aesthetics, "Those guys {Rubin and the Beastie Boys} would hang out at the front desk watching movies with him and as Rick started bands and the label ... Menello was along for the ride ... But more importantly, as all this stuff is starting, Menello helps to form Rick's aesthetic. Rick knows what he likes, but it takes Menello to help Rick understand it." Charnas has noted that Menello helped Rubin, a longtime fan of Abbott and Costello, understand why he liked the duo, "Rick [Rubin] liked the whole lowbrow setup of the thing, but what Menello helped Rick understand was that it was not the slapstick that Rick liked, but the combination of that lowbrow slapstick with a very highbrow sophisticated form."

Rubin chose Menello and his former roommate, Adam Dubin, to co-direct the music video for the Beastie Boys' 1987 single, "(You Gotta) Fight for Your Right (To Party!)" Menello had already co-written the draft of Tougher Than Leather, which wouldn't be released until 1988, when Rubin approached him about directing the Beastie Boys. Menello later described himself as hesitant to direct "(You Gotta) Fight for Your Right (To Party!)" out of concern of "ruining their careers," but accepted the offer. In a 2012 interview with MTV News, summed up his thoughts on the music video more than a quarter century later saying, "It was kind of a dumb video, but it was done in a very sophisticated way visually. I often say the style of the video is 'stupidity done in an intelligent way ... If I knew that people were going to be looking at them 26 years later, I would've done better! ... I wrote the movie 'Tougher Than Leather,' which the Beastie Boys appeared in, then Rick Rubin suggested I would be a good director for 'Fight for Your Right' because I had new ideas and it was better to fail at a new idea than to succeed with a crappy old idea." The landmark music video mixed in Menello's highbrow and lowbrow humor. Menello, a cinephile, added references to numerous films to the music video, including Breakfast at Tiffany's and Dawn of the Dead. Menello's video effectively launched the Beastie Boys' mainstream hip hop careers. Menello also crafted the low budget TV commercial for the Licensed to Ill album after the album began to take off in 1986.

Menello continued his association with the Beastie Boys by writing a television pilot, The Beastie Boys Get Stupid, which he co-created, with Rubin. He then wrote the screenplay for the feature-length film Scared Stupid, that was to mark The Beastie Boys feature film debut. When relations between Rubin and The Beastie Boys fractured, resulting in the Beasties leaving Def Jam, the feature film was shelved despite receiving full backing from New Line Cinema. Menello and Dubin co-directed the Beastie Boys' music video "No Sleep till Brooklyn" in 1987. Menello then went on to make several other music videos as a solo director including such highly distinct and hugely successful videos as LL Cool J's "Going Back to Cali", Danzig's "Mother", and Slick Rick's "Children's Story". He additionally crafted videos for artists as diverse as MC Lyte ("Cappuccino") and Marcia Griffiths. Rob Tannenbaum, the author of the 2011 book, I Want My MTV: The Uncensored Story of the Music Video Revolution, noted that "There are no more than a handful of music videos that have done more for a band's career and more vividly described their image than 'Fight For Your Right To Party', did for the Beastie Boys."

Menello continued to work behind the scenes writing and co-writing treatments for an endless stream of music videos. In 1993, he collaborated with his cousin and frequent collaborator Vincent Giordano on the treatments for Doro Pesch's "Bad Blood" and "Last Day of My Life," which Giordano both directed and shot. The Bad Blood video was originally influenced by Samuel Fuller's film Verboten! and their treatment further developed into a powerful, thought-provoking clip that was voted Best Anti-Racism video during the first MTV Europe Music Awards ceremony in 1994. The video later spawned a series of commercials and public service announcements by Doro calling for racial tolerance in Germany. Giordano and Menello continued working on music videos, with one of their last MTV collaborations being the low-budget video for Kittie's Funeral For Yesterday that Giordano directed and to which Menello contributed and co-wrote the treatment.

=== Screenwriting ===
Menello also worked as a screenwriter throughout the 1980s, 1990s, 2000s, and 2010s. He often wrote at night at the Vox Pop cafe in the Flatbush neighborhood of Brooklyn. He moved to another Brooklyn bar, Sycamore, when Vox Pop closed in 2011. He hosted a weekly film screening, with guests including Mark Romanek and Darren Aronofsky. Menello also collaborated with actors, including friend Owen Wilson, to revise and strengthen existing dialogue.

Menello and film director, James Gray, teamed up to co-write the 2008 romantic drama, Two Lovers, starring Gwyneth Paltrow and Joaquin Phoenix. Menello also co-wrote Gray's film The Immigrant, which stars Joaquin Phoenix, Marion Cotillard, and Jeremy Renner that screened at the Cannes Film Festival and the New York Film Festival prior to its May 2014 release through The Weinstein Company.

== Death ==
Menello died from a heart attack on March 1, 2013, aged 60.

A mosaic designed by artist Juan Carlos Pinto at the Newkirk Plaza Tunnel in Brooklyn was dedicated to Ric on May 11, 2013.

Immediately after Menello's death, Richard Brody eulogised Menello in series of articles which appeared in the New Yorker. The friends of Menello responded, citing factual inaccuracies in Brody's articles.
