= Juan Carlos Pinto =

United States mosaic artist

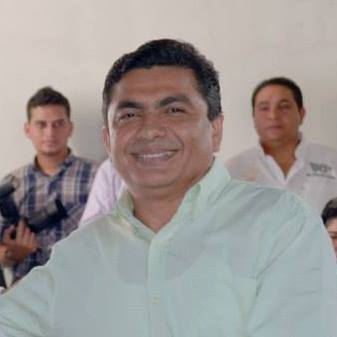
Lic. Juan Carlos Pinto Rodríguez

Juan Carlos Pinto (born 1968) is a Guatemalan-born Brooklyn, New York based United States mosaic artist who often works in the medium of New York City Metrocards along with other mixed-in materials.

== Career ==
Pinto exhibits at the Van Der Plas gallery and Ilon Art Gallery among other fine art venues.

In 2013 when the filmmaker and screenwriter Ric Menello (1952 -2013) died, Pinto designed a mosaic mural in tribute to him at Newkirk Plaza in Brooklyn, nearby his home in the Ditmas Park neighborhood of the New York City borough. Pinto's work along with other categorizations such as found object art is considered part of the street art genre. His metro card mosaic pieces often celebrate migration.

Pinto is the recipient of several awards form the Brooklyn Arts Council (BAC), including in 2025 for his "Brooklyn Recycle Project".

Pinto has also done a series of mosaics and mosaic murals for Two Boots Pizza at its various locations including a large work dedicated to the Puerto Rican and New York City writer and community activist Bimbo Rivas (1939–1992).

in 2014 and 2022 Pinto was featured on the CUNY Emmy Award winning television program "I'm a Dreamer" focusing on his experience and then in turn on his and another artist's he mentored and their of being a Guatemalan immigrant in New York City.

In 2025 director Chris Fiore made a documentary film about public reaction to Pinto's mosaic mural of the Trumpeter Swan the first public mural commissioned by the National Audubon Society and the public's reaction to it, titled Broadway & Swan.
