= John Berry (Beastie Boys) =

American guitarist (1963–2016)

- Born: May 31, 1963; New York City, U.S.
- Died: May 19, 2016 (aged 52) Danvers, Massachusetts, U.S.
- Genres: Hardcore punk
- Occupation: Musician
- Instruments: Guitar
- Formerly of: Beastie Boys
- Website: beastieboys.com

John Berry (May 31, 1963 – May 19, 2016) was an American hardcore punk musician. He was a founding member of the Beastie Boys, although he left the band in 1982 before they secured any commercial success.

Berry is credited with conceiving of the band's name, Beastie Boys, when the members were teenagers.

== Biography ==
Berry was born on May 31, 1963; his father was John N. Berry, a librarian and journal editor. He attended the Walden School in Manhattan. It was there that he met Michael Diamond, with whom he would found the Young Aborigines, later known as the Beastie Boys. The two other founding members were Adam Yauch and Kate Schellenbach.

The Beastie Boys were initially a hardcore punk band. It was formed at a time when the New York punk scene was witnessing a shift, and Berry was an important part of that transition. Berry played guitar on the band's first release, a seven-inch EP, Polly Wog Stew. He exited the band in 1984, and was replaced by Adam Horovitz, who would later become part of the band's core line-up after Schellenbach's subsequent departure.

Their first shows were at Berry’s loft on West 100th Street and Broadway on the Upper West Side.

He died on May 19, 2016, at a hospice in Danvers, Massachusetts, of frontotemporal dementia.
