= Cooky Puss =

1983 single by Beastie Boys

Single by Beastie Boys
- Released: 1983
- Recorded: March 1983
- Studio: Celebration Recording, New York City
- Genre: Electro, old-school hip-hop, comedy hip-hop
- Length: 13:39
- Label: Rat Cage
- Songwriters: Michael Diamond, Adam Horovitz, Kate Schellenbach, Adam Yauch
- Producers: Beastie Boys, Dug Pomeroy

Beastie Boys singles chronology
"Cooky Puss" (1983)	"Rock Hard" (1984)

Professional ratings
Review scores
Source	Rating
AllMusic	2.5/5 stars

"Cooky Puss" is the debut single by Beastie Boys. The song is their first hip-hop recording, their first release featuring band member Adam Horovitz, and their final release to feature drummer Kate Schellenbach. They had previously released the hardcore punk Pollywog Stew EP. It was released in 1983 as a 12-inch single on Rat Cage Records. The title, title track, and lyrics are satirical references to the Cookie Puss ice cream dessert.

All four tracks appear on the compilation album Some Old Bullshit.

The airline corporation British Airways used a portion of "Beastie Revolution" (chosen by Jeremy Healy without the band's permission) in one of their television ads; the Beastie Boys successfully sued the company for $40,000. They used the money to rent an apartment at 59 Chrystie Street in Chinatown, New York City, which provided living space but also a place for the group to rehearse and record. The group later thanked Jeremy Healy; the money from the lawsuit had kick-started their career. The apartment was remembered in "59 Chrystie Street," a song on 1989's Paul's Boutique LP.

== Track listing ==
Side A (listed as This Side)

1. "Cooky Puss" – 3:12
2. "Bonus Batter" – 2:15

Side B (listed as That Side)

1. "Beastie Revolution" – 5:00
2. "Cooky Puss" (censored version) – 3:12
