= Michael Quinion =

British etymologist and writer (born 1942)

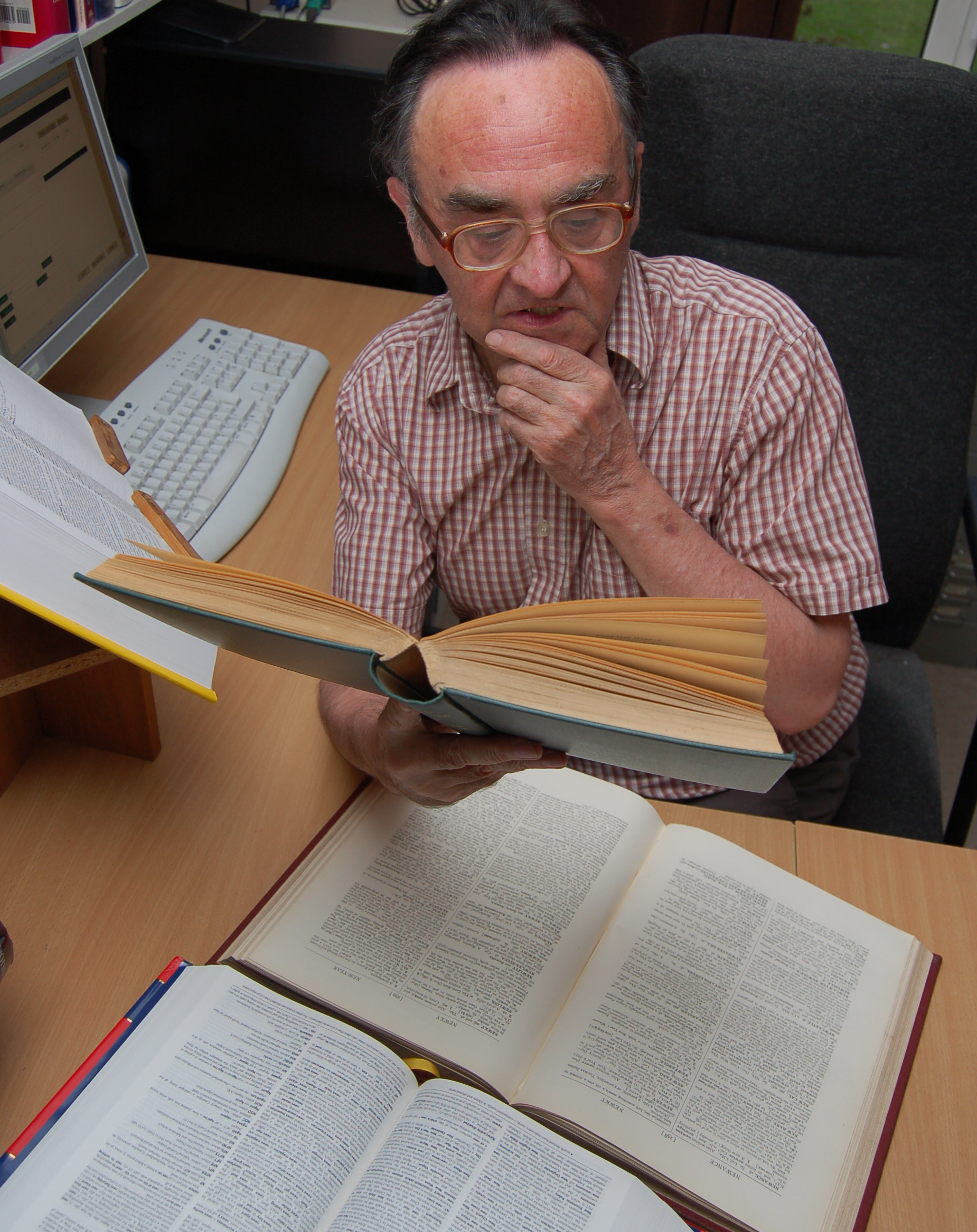
- Michael Quinion in his office
- Born: 1942 (age 83–84); United Kingdom
- Occupations: Etymologist, writer

Michael Brian Quinion (born c. 1942) is a British etymologist and writer. He ran World Wide Words, a website devoted to linguistics. He graduated from Peterhouse, Cambridge, where he studied physical sciences and after which he joined BBC radio as a studio manager.

== Writer ==
Quinion has contributed extensively to the Oxford English Dictionary as well as the Oxford Dictionary of New Words (Second Edition, 1996). He has since written Ologies and Isms (a 2002 dictionary of affixes) and Port Out, Starboard Home: And Other Language Myths (2004), published in the US as Ballyhoo, Buckaroo, and Spuds: Ingenious Tales of Words and Their Origins (Note: Port Out Starboard Home: And Other Language Myths is published outside the US by Penguin Books (Hardcover ISBN 0-14-051534-8/Paperback ISBN 0-14-101223-4) In the United States it is published by the Smithsonian Institution Press as Ballyhoo, Buckaroo, and Spuds (Hardcover ISBN 1-58834-219-0/Paperback ISBN 0-06-085153-8))

His most recent book is Gallimaufry: A Hodgepodge of Our Vanishing Vocabulary (2006). He wrote two books about orcharding and cidermaking, one titled Cidermaking (published by Shire Publications), the other, A Drink for Its Time, published by the Cider Museum in Hereford, where he served as curator.

== World Wide Words ==
Quinion is the author and webmaster of World Wide Words, a site that documents the meaning and derivation of English language words and phrases. It covers a wide range of issues, including etymology, grammar, neologisms, writing style and book reviews. This site explores International English from a British viewpoint. The website features a large database of word-related topics, weird words, articles on word and phrase origins, and answers to questions from site visitors. It also offers a free weekly newsletter, which contains the latest additions to the database one week before they are posted on the website. The time delay allows for newsletter subscribers to respond with additional insights and comments, some of which may be included on the posted articles.

On 18 October 2014, Quinion announced that in future his newsletters would be published less frequently because writing a scheduled weekly newsletter had become increasingly arduous. In early 2017, Quinion sent out a message to newsletter subscribers stating that for unspecified personal reasons he was suspending publication of World Wide Words. Then on 4 March 2017, Quinion released to subscribers confirmation that the newsletter would be immediately permanently ended due to his personal circumstances as well as his own changing personal interests.

A recurring theme in Quinion's articles is the criticism of false etymology. Such popular etymologies often have the effect of obscuring the true origins of a word or expression by providing a misleading and often unsubstantiated story explaining its origin. Quinion's Port Out, Starboard Home (Ballyhoo, Buckaroo, and Spuds in the US) deals with many such etymologies.

== Bibliography ==
- A Drink for Its Time: Farm Cider Making in the Western Counties 1979
- Cidermaking 1982, 2009
- Ologies and Isms: A Dictionary of Word Beginnings and Endings 2002
- Port Out, Starboard Home: And Other Language Myths 2004
- Gallimaufry: A Hodgepodge of Our Vanishing Vocabulary 2006
- Ballyhoo, Buckaroo, and Spuds: Ingenious Tales of Words and Their Origins 2006
- Why is Q Always Followed by U?: Word-Perfect Answers to the Most-Asked Questions About Language 2009
