= Brass Monkey (cocktail) =

Cocktail

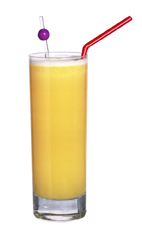
- A Brass Monkey cocktail
- Type: Mixed drink
- Ingredients: 1 part Dark rum 1 part Vodka; 2 parts Orange juice
- Standard drinkware: Highball glass
- Standard garnish: Orange slice
- Served: on the rocks
- Preparation: Shake all ingredients with ice, garnish with an orange slice and serve.

Brass Monkey was a brand of premixed cocktails produced by the Heublein Company. As with many lesser-known cocktails named after colloquial expressions, a variety of different recipes have also been referred to by the same name. After several years off the market, the Brass Monkey premixed cocktail reappeared in the late 2000s as The Club Brass Monkey, part of the Club Cocktails line produced by The Club Distilling Company (then owned by Diageo), but it has since been discontinued.

== History ==
In the 1970s, 1980s, and 1990s, the Heublein Company produced the premixed cocktail called Brass Monkey. Heublein premixed bottled cocktails were inexpensive and offered a portable alternative to mixed drinks. The company was based in Stamford, Connecticut, with production facilities in the Hartford, Connecticut, area. The Brass Monkey cocktail was sold in bottles ranging from half-pint to 750 ml. At the time, liquor stores stocked mainly beer, wine, and spirits, with few premixed alternatives available.

Steve Doniger, an advertising executive, named the brand after The Brass Monkey, a club in Macao which served a signature drink of the same name. According to the company's marketing, the club was frequented during World War II by allied spies who obtained the name of their contact, H. E. Rasske, using letters extracted from "The Brass Monkey". Allan Kaufman, who created stories about Rasske, devised an advertising campaign using an old photograph of his father as Rasske’s image.

In 1982, the R. J. Reynolds Tobacco Company acquired Heublein Inc. for $1.4 billion. RJR Nabisco sold the division to Grand Metropolitan in 1987. Grand Metropolitan merged with Guinness to form Diageo in 1997.

The Brass Monkey cocktail is not classified by the International Bartenders Association (IBA).

=== Beastie Boys song ===
Sales of Brass Monkey increased in the 1980s after the release of the Beastie Boys' song of the same name. It was widely but incorrectly believed that the group were referring to a different drink made from a 40-ounce bottle of malt liquor mixed with orange juice ("forty" is mentioned in the lyrics). Mike D has publicly confirmed that the premixed Heublein cocktail was their inspiration.

=== Cocktail Ratio ===
The Brass Monkey is a free-form cocktail, its ingredients and amounts vary but most versions call for;

- Dark rum 30 ml
- Vodka 30 ml
- Orange juice 60 ml
- Ice with an Orange wedge for garnish
