= Licensed to Ill =

Studio album by Beastie Boys
- Released: November 15, 1986
- Recorded: 1985–1986
- Studio: Chung King (New York City)
- Genres: Rap rock; hip-hop
- Length: 44:32
- Labels: Def Jam; Columbia
- Producer: Rick Rubin

Beastie Boys chronology
Polly Wog Stew (1982)	Licensed to Ill (1986)	Paul's Boutique (1989)

Singles from Licensed to Ill
- 1. "Hold It Now, Hit It" Released: April 15, 1986; 2. "Paul Revere" Released: August 13, 1986; 3. "The New Style" Released: November 6, 1986; 4. "(You Gotta) Fight for Your Right (To Party!)" Released: December 1986; 5. "Brass Monkey" Released: January 5, 1987; 6. "No Sleep till Brooklyn" Released: March 1, 1987; 7. "Girls" Released: May 6, 1987

Licensed to Ill is the debut studio album by the American hip-hop group Beastie Boys, released on November 15, 1986, by Def Jam and Columbia Records. The album became the first rap LP to top the Billboard 200 chart, and was the second rap album to be certified Platinum by the Recording Industry Association of America (RIAA). It is one of Columbia Records' fastest-selling debut records to date and was certified Diamond by the RIAA in 2015 for shipping over ten million copies in the United States. The album received critical acclaim for its unique musical style, chemistry between the group members, and their stylized rapping. Since its release, Licensed to Ill has been ranked by critics as one of the greatest hip-hop and debut albums of all time.

Despite its popularity and success, this would be the group’s only album to be released from Def Jam due to creative differences with producer Rick Rubin, resulting in the group leaving the label to sign with Capitol Records for their next album, Paul's Boutique (1989).

== Background ==
Rubin originally wanted to title the album Don't Be a Faggot, but Columbia Records refused to release the album under this title—arguing that it was homophobic—and pressured Russell Simmons, Beastie Boys' manager and head of Def Jam Recordings at the time, into forcing them to choose another name. Adam Horovitz has since apologized for the album's earlier title.

Kerry King and Jeff Hanneman of Slayer provided uncredited guitar work on the songs "Fight for Your Right" and "No Sleep Till Brooklyn"; King appeared in the music video for the latter, which is a parody of glam metal. The name of the song itself is a spoof on Motörhead's No Sleep 'til Hammersmith album. At the time, Rick Rubin was producing both bands simultaneously (Slayer's Reign in Blood was released one month prior on Def Jam).

CBS/Fox Video released a video album of the five Licensed to Ill videos, plus "She's on It" in 1987 to capitalize on the album's success. A laserdisc version was also released in Japan. All versions of the CBS/Fox release are currently out of print because the rights to the album passed from Columbia and Sony Music to Universal Music Group, and also because of the acrimonious nature of the band's departure from Def Jam Records. Until the 2005 release of the CD/DVD Solid Gold Hits, none of the Def Jam-era videos had been included on any subsequent Beastie Boys video compilations. The Solid Gold Hits DVD includes the videos for "Fight for Your Right" and "No Sleep Till Brooklyn", as well as a live version of "Brass Monkey" from a 2004 concert.

Beastie Boys recorded a loose rendition of the Beatles' "I'm Down" for the album, which included sampling of the original song, but the track was pulled at the last minute due to legal disputes with Michael Jackson who owned the publishing rights. Both "I'm Down," and another track, "Scenario," were cut at the last minute. Bootleg versions of the songs can be found on the internet.

The album is dedicated to Doris Keefe Horovitz, the mother of Beastie Boys member Adam "Ad-Rock" Horovitz, in the credits panel of the record liner. Run-DMC are also acknowledged there.

== Artwork ==
The full album cover, front to back, features an American Airlines Boeing 727 with a Beastie Boys logo on its tail, which has crashed head-on into the side of a mountain, the former taking the shape of an extinguished cannabis joint. The tail of the plane also features the Def Jam logo and the registration number '3MTA3' which spells 'EATME' when viewed in a mirror. The idea for the album's cover came from the album's producer, Rick Rubin, after reading the Led Zeppelin biography Hammer of the Gods. The art director was Stephen Byram and the artwork was created by David Gambale (World B. Omés).

The album cover was featured in Storm Thorgerson's and Aubrey Powell's book, 100 Best Album Covers. Additionally, the design was strongly referenced by rapper Eminem for the cover of his 2018 album, Kamikaze.

== Critical reception ==
Professional ratings
Review scores
Source	Rating
AllMusic	5/5 stars
Christgau's Record Guide	A+
Orlando Sentinel	4/5 stars
Pitchfork	7.8/10
Q	4/5 stars
RapReviews	10/10
The Rolling Stone Album Guide	5/5 stars
The Source	5/5
Smash Hits	6½/10
Spin Alternative Record Guide	10/10

Licensed to Ill was met with critical acclaim. In 1998, the album was selected as one of The Source's 100 Best Rap Albums. It is the only album by a Jewish hip-hop act to receive 5 mics from The Source. In 2003, the album was ranked number 217 on Rolling Stone magazine's list of the 500 greatest albums of all time, 219 in a 2012 revised list, and 192 in a 2020 revised list. In 2013 the magazine named it the 48th best debut album of all time. Vibe included it in Vibe's 100 Essential Albums of the 20th Century. Q gave the album four out of five stars, saying "Licensed to Ill remains the world's only punk rock rap album, arguably superior to Never Mind the Bollocks ... knowing that apathy and slovenliness were just around the corner." Melody Maker gave the album a positive review, saying "There's lots of self-reverential bragging, more tenuous rhymes than are usually permitted by law and, most importantly of all, an unshakably glorious celebration of being alive ... A surprisingly enduring classic." In 2002, Pitchfork ranked the album at number 41 on its list of the "Top 100 Albums of the 1980s", despite their prior unflattering review of the album. In the 2018 edition of the "Top 200 Albums of the 1980s", the album placed number 103.

In 2006, Q magazine placed the album at number 16 in its list of "40 Best Albums of the '80s". In 2012, Slant Magazine listed the album at number 12 on its list of "Best Albums of the 1980s" saying "Rife with layer upon layer of sampling, start-stop transitions, and aggressive beats, it helped transform the genre from a direct dialogue between MC and DJ into a piercing, multi-threaded narrative" and "helped set an exciting template for the future". Eminem said the album was one of his favorites of all time and said it changed hip-hop. The album was also included in the book 1001 Albums You Must Hear Before You Die.

Cash Box called "She's Crafty" a "slamming tongue-in-cheek rocker."

== Commercial performance ==
The album was certified Platinum by the Recording Industry Association of America (RIAA) on February 2, 1987 and eventually was certified Diamond on March 4, 2015. The single "Brass Monkey" was certified Gold for shipment of 500,000+ sales. In 2012, in the week following Adam Yauch's death, which subsequently resulted in a surge in sales of Beastie Boys albums, Licensed to Ill reached number 1 on Billboard's Catalog Albums chart. The album also re-entered the Billboard 200 chart at number 18.

== Track listing ==
All tracks are written by Beastie Boys and Rick Rubin, except where noted.

Side one
No.	Title	Length
1.	"Rhymin & Stealin"	4:08
2.	"The New Style"	4:35
3.	"She's Crafty"	3:35
4.	"Posse in Effect"	2:26
5.	"Slow Ride"	2:56
6.	"Girls"	2:12
7.	"Fight for Your Right"	3:28

Side two
No.	Title	Writer(s)	Length
8.	"No Sleep till Brooklyn"		4:06
9.	"Paul Revere"	Adam Horovitz; Darryl McDaniels; Rubin; Joseph Simmons	3:40
10.	"Hold It Now, Hit It"		3:26
11.	"Brass Monkey"		2:37
12.	"Slow and Low"	McDaniels; Rubin; Simmons	3:38
13.	"Time to Get Ill"		3:39
Total length:			44:32

=== Samples and interpolations ===
- "Rhymin and Stealin" samples the drums from "When the Levee Breaks" by Led Zeppelin, the guitar riff from "Sweet Leaf" by Black Sabbath, and a part from The Clash's cover of "I Fought The Law".
- "She's Crafty" contains a sample of the guitar riff from "The Ocean" by Led Zeppelin.
- "Slow Ride" incorporates the hook of "Low Rider" by War.
- "Hold It Now, Hit It" contains a sample of "Let's Get Small" by Trouble Funk.
- "Time to Get Ill" samples the guitar riff from Led Zeppelin's "Custard Pie".

== Personnel ==
- Beastie Boys – co-producers
- Rick Rubin – producer, rhythm guitar on "No Sleep till Brooklyn"
- Steven Ett – engineer
- Joe Blaney – mixing
- Steve Byram – art direction
- Sunny Bak – photography
- World B. Omes (David Gambale) – cover art
- Nelson Keene Carse, Tony Orbach, Danny Lipman – horns and percussion on "Slow Ride"
- Kerry King – lead guitar on "Fight for Your Right" and "No Sleep till Brooklyn"

== Charts ==
=== Weekly charts ===
Weekly chart performance for Licensed to Ill
Chart (1987–2017)	Peak position
Australian Albums (Kent Music Report)	62
Belgian Albums (Ultratop Flanders)	46
Belgian Albums (Ultratop Wallonia)	38
Canada Top Albums/CDs (RPM)	5
Dutch Albums (Album Top 100)	15
Finnish Albums (Suomen virallinen lista)	25
German Albums (Offizielle Top 100)	23
New Zealand Albums (RMNZ)	12
Swedish Albums (Sverigetopplistan)	30
UK Albums (Official Charts)	7
US Billboard 200	1
US Top R&B/Hip-Hop Albums (Billboard)	2

=== Year-end charts ===
1987 year-end chart performance for Licensed to Ill
Chart (1987)	Position
Dutch Albums (Album Top 100)	20
European Albums (Music & Media)	26
German Albums (Offizielle Top 100)	57
US Billboard 200	3
US Top R&B/Hip-Hop Albums (Billboard)	7

2002 year-end chart performance for Licensed to Ill
Chart (2002)	Position
Canadian R&B Albums (Nielsen SoundScan)	125
Canadian Rap Albums (Nielsen SoundScan)	67

2012 year-end chart performance for Licensed to Ill
Chart (2012)	Position
US Billboard 200	200

== Certifications ==
Certifications and sales for Licensed to Ill
Region	Certification	Certified units/sales
Canada (Music Canada)	2× Platinum	200,000^{^}
United Kingdom (BPI)	Gold	100,000^{^}
United States (RIAA)	Diamond	10,000,000^{^}
^{^} Shipments figures based on certification alone.

== See also ==
- Album era
- Kamikaze, a 2018 Eminem album with an inspired cover.
