= Rat Cage Records =

- Founder: Donna Lee Parsons
- Country of origin: United States
- Location: New York City

Rat Cage was an independent punk record label founded by Donna Lee Parsons in New York City. It was run out of a record store of the same name.

The label is best known for releasing the Beastie Boys’ debut EP, Polly Wog Stew, as well as their first hip-hop release, the maxi-single Cooky Puss. Some of its other notable signees included Agnostic Front and Heart Attack. Donna Parsons is also credited with designing the Bad Brains’ iconic “lighting bolt” cover featured on their self-titled LP.

In 2002, Parsons came out as a trans woman; although they had long achieved worldwide fame, the Beastie Boys paid for her gender-affirming surgery. Knowing she wouldn’t accept such a donation, they sent her money under the guise of royalties for Polly Wog Stew. Parsons died a year later - on September 23rd, 2003 - of colon cancer.

Rat Cage discography:

- CT-001 Crucial T. - Darkened Days (7", EP)
- MOTR 21 Beastie Boys - Polly Wog Stew EP (7")
- MOTR 21C Beastie Boys - Polly Wog Stew EP (Cass)
- MOTR 21CD Beastie Boys - Polly Wog Stew EP (CD)
- MOTR 21T Beastie Boys - Polly Wog Stew EP (12")
- MOTR 24 The Young And The Useless - Real Men Don't Floss (7", EP)
- MOTR 25 Neos - Hassibah Gets The Martian Brain Squeeze (7", EP)
- MOTR 26 Beastie Boys - Cooky Puss (12", Single)
- MOTR 26 CD Beastie Boys - Cooky Puss (CD, Maxi)
- MOTR 27 Heart Attack - Subliminal Seduction (12", EP)
- MOTR 28 Rattus - Rattus (LP, Album)
- MOTR 29 Agnostic Front - Victim In Pain (LP, Album)
- MOTR 29C Agnostic Front - Victim In Pain (Cass)
- MOTR 31 Virus - Dark Ages (12", EP)

== See also ==
- List of record labels
