= Simply Mortified =

Studio album by BS 2000
- Released: February 6, 2001
- Studio: The Dungeon (New York, NY)
- Length: 40:32
- Label: Grand Royal
- Producer: Ad-Rock; Amery "AWOL" Smith

BS 2000 chronology
BS 2000 (1997)	Simply Mortified (2001)

Singles from Simply Mortified
- 1. "Buddy" Released: November 7, 2000

Professional ratings
Review scores
Source	Rating
AllMusic	4/5 stars
Entertainment Weekly	B
NME	2/5 stars
Pitchfork	7.9/10
The Village Voice	(dud)

Simply Mortified is the second and final studio album by American rock duo BS 2000. It was released on February 6, 2001, through Grand Royal. Recording sessions took place at The Dungeon in New York. Production was handled by members Ad-Rock and Amery "AWOL" Smith. It features guest appearance from Janay North. The album was preceded by a single "Buddy" and promotional singles "The Scrappy" and "It Feels Like".

== Track listing ==
All tracks are written by Adam Horovitz and Amery Smith, except track 7 written by Granville "Sascha" Burland.

No.	Title	Length
1.	"N.Y. Is Good"	2:28
2.	"Sick For a Reason"	1:44
3.	"It Feels Like ?!@#?!"	2:18
4.	"Yeah I Like BS" (featuring Janay North)	2:19
5.	"Buddy"	1:46
6.	"Better Better"	1:43
7.	"No Matter What Shape (Your Stomach Is in)"	2:19
8.	"The Side to Side"	3:01
9.	"Extractions"	1:50
10.	"Boodie Bored"	1:21
11.	"Wait a Minute"	1:24
12.	"New Gouda"	2:01
13.	"Save This For Davis"	2:07
14.	"The Scrappy"	3:10
15.	"Mr. Critic"	1:22
16.	"Flossin' at Lawson"	2:00
17.	"Dig Deeper"	1:09
18.	"The Dilemma"	2:11
19.	"In the Basement"	1:24
20.	"Dansk Party"	2:55
Total length:		40:32

Japanese version bonus tracks
No.	Title	Length
21.	"Sing To Your Sink"	2:04
22.	"The Mom Song"	2:31

== Personnel ==
- Adam "Ad-Rock" Horovitz – songwriter (tracks: 1–6, 8–20), producer, mixing (tracks: 10, 13, 15, 18), recording
- Amery "AWOL" Smith – songwriter (tracks: 1–6, 8–20), producer, mixing (tracks: 10, 13, 15, 18), recording
- Granville Alexander "Sascha" Burland – songwriter (track 7)
- Janay North – featured artist (track 4)
- James Murphy – mixing (tracks: 1–12, 14, 16, 17, 19, 20)
- Tim Goldsworthy – mixing (tracks: 1–12, 14, 16, 17, 19, 20)
- Dave Pinsky – mixing (tracks: 10, 13, 15, 18)
