= Brass Monkey (song) =

Single by Beastie Boys

from the album Licensed to Ill
- Released: January 5, 1987
- Recorded: 1986
- Genre: Hip-hop
- Length: 2:37
- Label: Def Jam/Columbia
- Songwriters: Beastie Boys, Rick Rubin
- Producer: Rick Rubin

Beastie Boys singles chronology
"(You Gotta) Fight for Your Right (To Party!)" (1986)	"Brass Monkey" (1987)	"No Sleep till Brooklyn" (1987)

Music video
- "Brass Monkey" on YouTube

"Brass Monkey" is a song by the American hip-hop group Beastie Boys. It was a single released from their first album Licensed to Ill. It is also on the Beastie Boys' compilation album Solid Gold Hits.

== Background ==
"Brass Monkey" samples "Bring It Here" by Wild Sugar. The song features the Roland TR-808 drum machine. The song is named after the Heublein Company alcoholic drink of the same name, which is mentioned several times throughout the song. Cash Box called it a "scratchy rap send up." Notably, professional wrestler "Speedball" Mike Bailey uses "Brass Monkey" as his entrance song on the worldwide independent circuit, particularly in Deadlock Pro Wrestling (DPW), Pro Wrestling Guerrilla (PWG) and Game Changer Wrestling (GCW).

== Covers ==
The Dave Matthews Band covered this song at Jones Beach, New York, in 2013. It was strung in with "Too Much" and "Ants Marching".

Richard Cheese covered the song on his studio album Aperitif for Destruction, as well as on his live album Viva la Vodka as a medley, interpolated with lyrics from "Intergalactic", "Ch-Check It Out", "Sabotage" and "Three MC's and One DJ".

== Charts ==
Chart (1987)	Peak position
US Billboard Hot 100	48
US Hot R&B/Hip-Hop Songs (Billboard)	83

Chart (2012)	Peak position
US Billboard Rap Digital Songs	32

== Certifications ==
Region	Certification	Certified units/sales
United States (RIAA) Mastertone	Gold	500,000^{*}
^{*} Sales figures based on certification alone.
