= Beastie Boys =

American hip-hop group (1981–2012)

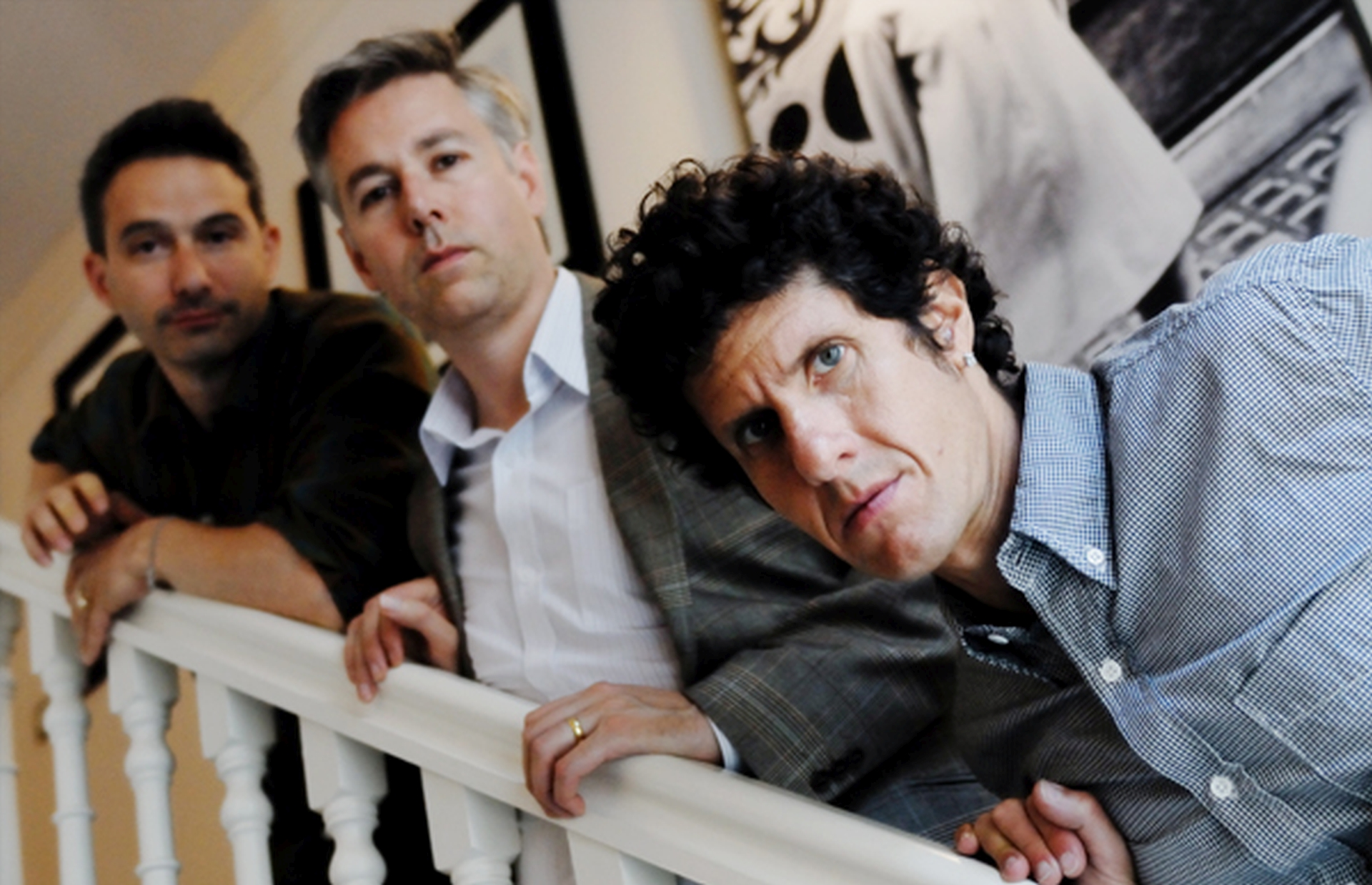
- The Beastie Boys in 2009. From left: Ad-Rock, MCA, Mike D

Background information
- Origin: New York City, U.S.
- Genres: Hip-hop; alternative hip-hop; rap rock; hardcore punk (early)
- Works: Discography
- Years active: 1981–2012
- Labels: Rat Cage; Def Jam; Columbia; Capitol; Grand Royal
- Spinoffs: BS 2000; The Latch Brothers
- Spinoff of: The Young Aborigines
- Past members: MCA; Mike D; Ad-Rock; John Berry; Kate Schellenbach
- Website: beastieboys.com

The Beastie Boys were an American hip-hop group formed in New York City in 1981. Their main line-up consisted of Adam "Ad-Rock" Horovitz (vocals, guitar), Adam "MCA" Yauch (vocals, bass), and Michael "Mike D" Diamond (vocals, drums).

The Beastie Boys were previously members of the hardcore punk band the Young Aborigines, with Diamond on drums, Jeremy Shatan on bass guitar, and John Berry on guitar. Kate Schellenbach later joined on drums. When Shatan left in mid-1981, Yauch replaced him on bass and the band was renamed the Beastie Boys. Berry left shortly thereafter and was replaced by Horovitz, the guitarist of The Young and the Useless. After achieving local success with the 1983 comedy hip-hop single "Cooky Puss", the Beastie Boys made a full transition to hip-hop and Schellenbach subsequently left, with the group's final lineup consisting of Diamond, Horovitz and Yauch. Yauch, a filmmaker, directed many of the Beastie Boys' music videos under the alias Nathanial Hörnblowér.

The Beastie Boys toured with Madonna in 1985, after she discovered them while frequenting Danceteria. In 1986, they released their debut album, Licensed to Ill. It was the first rap album to top the Billboard 200 chart and was influenced by their beginnings in rock. Their second album, Paul's Boutique (1989), was made with the Dust Brothers and consisted almost entirely of samples. It was a commercial failure but received critical and cult acclaim. Check Your Head (1992) and Ill Communication (1994) found mainstream success, followed by Hello Nasty (1998), To the 5 Boroughs (2004), the entirely instrumental album The Mix-Up (2007), and Hot Sauce Committee Part Two (2011), their final album.

Their last live performance was at the 2009 Bonnaroo Music Festival, before they stopped due to Yauch's diagnosis of parotid cancer. In 2012, the Beastie Boys became the third rap group to be inducted into the Rock and Roll Hall of Fame. Later that year, Yauch died and the Beastie Boys disbanded. Retrospective works include the Beastie Boys Book, a documentary and several compilation albums.

== History ==
=== 1981–1983: Formation and early years ===
Prior to forming the Beastie Boys, Michael Diamond, a childhood friend of Adam Yauch, played in bands including the Walden Jazz Band and BAN. The Young Aborigines formed in 1979. In 1981, when the bassist, Jeremy Shatan, left New York City for the summer, the remaining members Diamond, John Berry and Kate Schellenbach began to perform as the Beastie Boys with Yauch.

In a 2007 interview with Charlie Rose, Yauch recalled that it was Berry who suggested the name the Beastie Boys. Although the band stated that "Beastie" is an acronym standing for "Boys Entering Anarchistic States Towards Inner Excellence", in the Charlie Rose interview, both Yauch and Diamond acknowledged that the acronym was an "afterthought" conceived after the name was chosen. The band supported Bad Brains, the Dead Kennedys, the Misfits and Reagan Youth at venues such as CBGB, A7, Trude Heller's and Max's Kansas City, playing at the latter venue on its closing night. In November 1982, the Beastie Boys recorded the 7-inch EP Polly Wog Stew at 171A studios, an early recorded example of New York hardcore.

On November 13, 1982, the Beastie Boys played Philip Pucci's birthday for the purposes of his short concert film Beastie. Pucci held the concert in Bard College's Preston Drama Dance Department Theatre. This performance marked the Beastie Boys' first on-screen appearance in a published motion picture. Pucci's concept for Beastie was to distribute a mixture of both a half dozen 16 mm Bell & Howell Filmo cameras, and 16 mm Bolex cameras to audience members and ask that they capture the Beastie Boys performance from the audience's own point of view while a master sync sound camera filmed from the balcony of the abandoned theater where the performance was held. The opening band for that performance was the Young and the Useless, which featured Adam Horovitz as the lead singer. A one-minute clip of Beastie was subsequently excerpted and licensed by the Beastie Boys for use in the "Egg Raid on Mojo" segment of the "Skills to Pay the Bills" long-form home video released by Capitol Records. "Skills to Pay the Bills" later went on to be certified Gold by the Recording Industry Association of America (RIAA). Berry left the group in 1982 (later forming Thwig, Big Fat Love and Bourbon Deluxe) and was replaced by Horovitz, who had become close friends with the Beastie Boys.

The band also recorded and then performed its first hip-hop track, "Cooky Puss", based on a prank call by the group to a Carvel Ice Cream franchise in 1983. It was a part of the new lineup's first EP, also called Cooky Puss, which was the first piece of work that showed their incorporation of the underground rap phenomenon and the use of samples. It quickly became a hit in New York underground dance clubs and night clubs. After "Beastie Revolution" was later sampled in a British Airways commercial, the Beastie Boys threatened to sue them over the use of the song, and the airline immediately paid them $40,000 in royalties.

=== 1984–1987: Def Jam years and Licensed to Ill ===
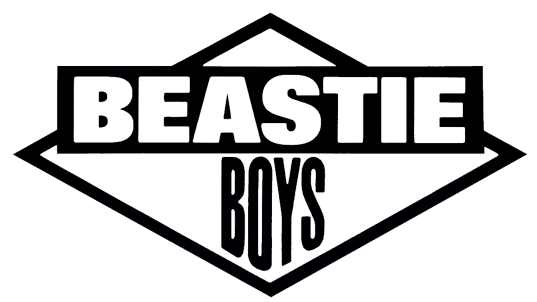
Logo used circa 1985–1987

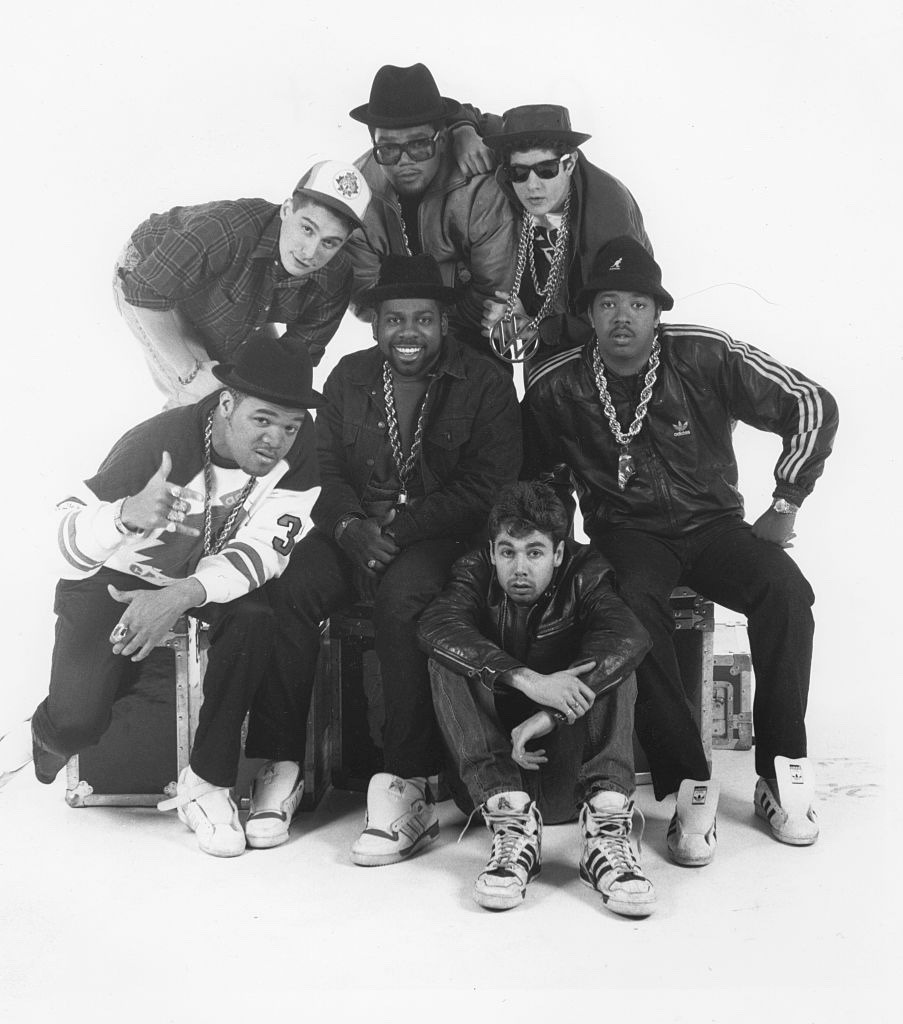
The Beastie Boys in a publicity photo for the 1987 Together Forever tour with DJ Hurricane and the members of Run-DMC.

Following the success of "Cooky Puss", the band began to incorporate rap into their sets. They hired a DJ for their live shows, New York University student Rick Rubin, who began producing records soon thereafter. "I met Mike first," Rubin recalled. "I thought he was an arrogant asshole. Through spending time with the Beasties I grew to see that they had this great sense of humor. It wasn't that they were assholes, and even if it was, they were funny with it." Rubin formed Def Jam Recordings with Russell Simmons, and approached the band about producing them for his new label. As the band was transitioning to hip-hop, Rubin gave them an ultimatum and Schellenbach was forced out of the group in 1984. Rubin told her he "didn't like the sound of women rapping" and that the band wouldn't achieve success with a female member. Diamond took over on drums. In their 2018 memoir, Ad-Rock expressed regret over firing Schellenbach, which he attributed to her not fitting with the "new tough-rapper-guy identity". Schellenbach went on to be the drummer of Luscious Jackson, which signed with the Beastie Boys' label Grand Royal. The group continued to play with Schellenbach and The Young and the Useless during their early days.

The band's 12-inch single "Rock Hard" (later recalled due to copyright disputes with AC/DC) was the second Def Jam record to credit Rubin as producer (the first being "It's Yours" by T La Rock and Jazzy Jay). During 1985, the group was the supporting act of the Virgin Tour, Madonna's first concert series. On July 22, 1986, the Beastie Boys opened for John Lydon's post-Sex Pistols band Public Image Ltd., They headlined with Fishbone and Murphy's Law with DJ Hurricane, and later in the year the group was on the Raising Hell tour with Run-DMC, Whodini, LL Cool J, and the Timex Social Club. Thanks to this exposure, "Hold It Now, Hit It" charted on Billboard's US R&B and dance charts. "She's on It" from the Krush Groove soundtrack continued in a rap/metal vein while a double A-side 12", "Paul Revere/The New Style", was released at the end of the year.

The Beastie Boys worked on their debut album with Simmons and Rubin, the latter of whom suggested the tentative title Don't Be A Faggot. As it contained a homophobic slur, it was met with pushback from Capitol Records and renamed to Licensed to Ill and released on November 15, 1986. It was favorably reviewed by Rolling Stone. Licensed to Ill became one of the best-selling rap albums of the 1980s and the first rap album to go number 1 on the Billboard 200 chart, where it stayed for five weeks. It also reached number 2 on the Top R&B album chart. It was Def Jam's fastest selling debut record to date and sold over nine million copies. The fourth single, "(You Gotta) Fight for Your Right (To Party!)", reached number 7 on the US Billboard Hot 100. Although the group has sold over 26-million records in the US, this is their only single to peak in the US top ten or top twenty. The accompanying video (directed by Ric Menello and Adam Dubin) became an MTV staple. Another song from the album, "No Sleep till Brooklyn", peaked at number 14 on the UK Singles Chart.

The Beastie Boys toured the world the following year. The tour was troubled by lawsuits and arrests, with the band accused of provoking the crowd. The group received overwhelmingly negative press in the United Kingdom tabloids and a session of the British Parliament was held to determine whether the Beastie Boys should be allowed to perform in the country. This culminated in a notorious gig at the Royal Court Theatre, Liverpool, England, on May 30, 1987, that erupted into a riot approximately 10 minutes after the group hit the stage. Horovitz was arrested by Merseyside Police and charged with assault causing grievous bodily harm.

=== 1988–1989: Move to Capitol Records and Paul's Boutique ===
In 1988, the Beastie Boys appeared in Tougher Than Leather, a film directed by Rubin as a star vehicle for Run-D.M.C. and Def Jam Recordings. After Def Jam stopped paying them for work they had already done and were owed money for, the Beastie Boys left Def Jam and signed with Capitol Records.

The second Beastie Boys album, Paul's Boutique, was released on July 25, 1989. Produced by the Dust Brothers, it blends eclectic samples and has been described as an early work of experimental hip-hop. It failed to match the sales of Licensed to Ill, reaching number 14 on the US album charts, but later attracted acclaim; Rolling Stone ranked it number 156 on its list of the 500 Greatest Albums of All Time. It also made it onto the Apple Music 100 Best Albums list at number 48.

=== 1990–1997: Check Your Head and Ill Communication ===
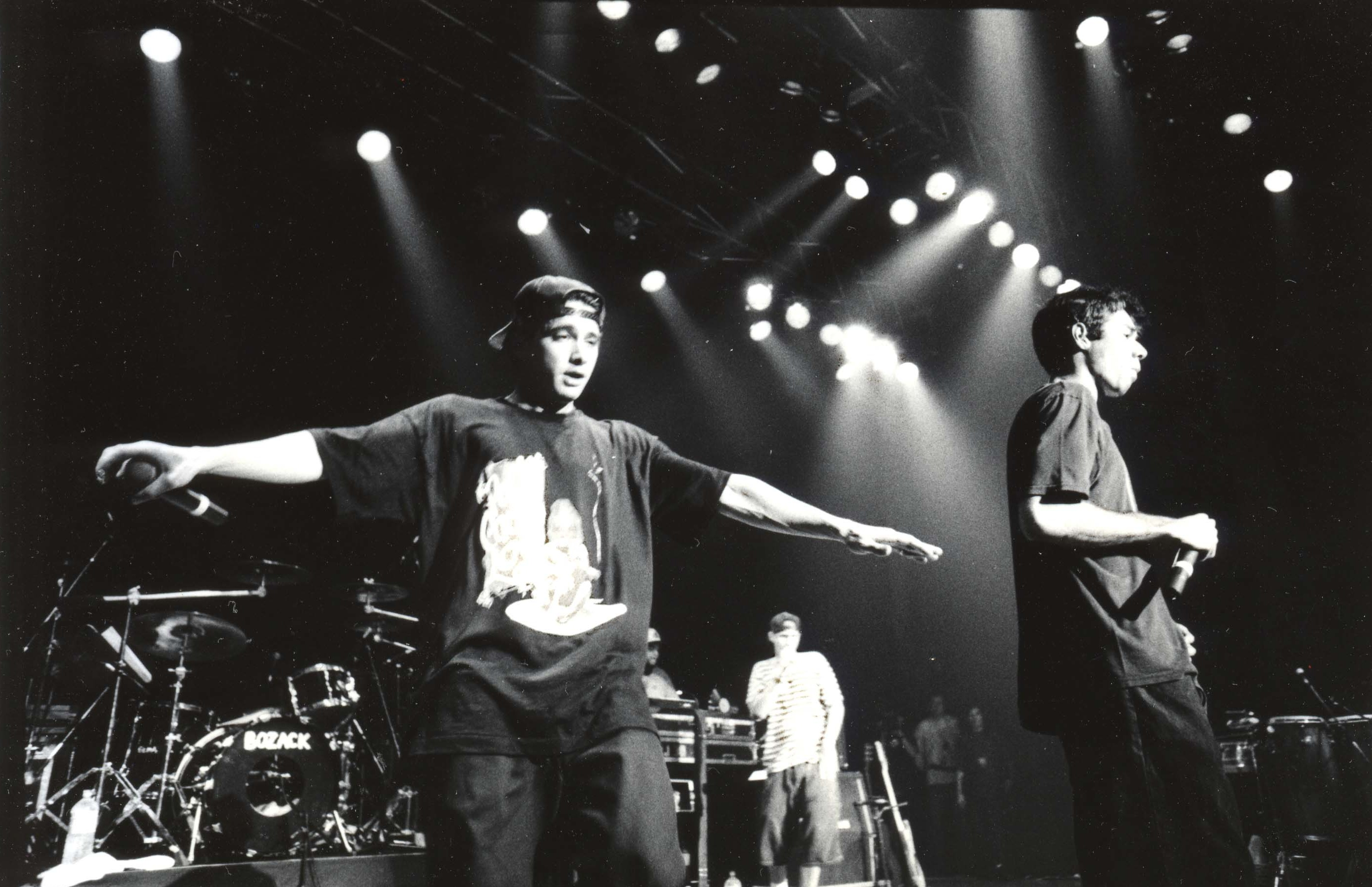
The Beastie Boys at Club Citta Kawasaki, Japan, on the Check Your Head tour, 1992

The third Beastie Boys album Check Your Head was recorded in the band's G-Son studio in Atwater Village, California, and released on its Grand Royal record label. The band was influenced to play instruments on this album by Dutch group Urban Dance Squad; with Mike D on drums, Yauch on bass, Horovitz on guitar and Mark Ramos Nishita ("Keyboard Money Mark") on keyboards. Mario Caldato, Jr., who had helped in the production of Paul's Boutique, engineered the record and became a longtime collaborator. Check Your Head was released in 1992 and was certified double Platinum in the US and peaked at number 10 on the Billboard 200. The single "So What'cha Want" reached number 93 on the Billboard Hot 100 and charted on both the Rap and Modern Rock Chart, while the album's first single, "Pass the Mic", peaked at number 38 on the Hot Dance Music chart. The album also introduced a more experimental direction, with funk and jazz inspired songs including "Lighten Up" and "Something's Got to Give". The band returned to their hardcore punk roots for the song "Time for Livin'", a cover of a 1974 Sly and the Family Stone song. The addition of instruments and the harder rock sound of the album could be considered a precursor to the nu metal genre of music to come out in the later half of the 1990s.

The Beastie Boys signed an eclectic roster of artists to their Grand Royal label, including their ex-bandmate Schellenbach's band Luscious Jackson, Sean Lennon, and Australian artist Ben Lee. The group owned Grand Royal Records until 2001. Grand Royal's first independent release was Luscious Jackson's album In Search of Manny in 1993. Also in 1993, the band contributed the track "It's the New Style" (with DJ Hurricane) to the AIDS benefit album No Alternative, produced by the Red Hot Organization.

The Beastie Boys also published Grand Royal Magazine, which ran for six issues between 1993 and 1997, the first issue featuring a cover story on Bruce Lee, artwork by George Clinton, and interviews with Kareem Abdul-Jabbar and A Tribe Called Quest's MC Q-Tip. The 1995 issue of the magazine contained a piece on the mullet. The Oxford English Dictionary cites this as the first published use of the term, along with the lyrics from the band's 1994 song, "Mullet Head". That term was not heard in the 1980s, even though that decade has retroactively been hailed as the mullet's peak in popularity. The OED says that the term was "apparently coined, and certainly popularized, by US hip-hop group Beastie Boys".

Ill Communication, released in 1994, saw the Beastie Boys' return to the top of the charts when the album debuted at number 1 on the Billboard 200 and peaked at number 2 on the R&B/Hip-Hop Albums chart. The single "Sabotage" became a hit on the modern rock charts and the music video, directed by Spike Jonze, received extensive play on MTV. Also in 1994, the band released Some Old Bullshit, featuring the band's early independent material, which made it to number 46 on the Billboard Independent Albums chart.

The Beastie Boys headlined at Lollapalooza—an American travelling music festival—in 1994, together with the Smashing Pumpkins. In addition, the band performed three concerts (in Los Angeles, New York City, and Washington, D.C.) to raise money for the Milarepa Fund and dedicated the royalties from "Shambala" and "Bodhisattva Vow" from Ill Communication to the cause. The Milarepa Fund aims to raise awareness of Tibetan human rights issues and the exile of the Dalai Lama. In 1996, Yauch organized the largest rock benefit show since 1985's Live Aid – the Tibetan Freedom Concert, a two-day festival at Golden Gate Park in San Francisco that attracted over 100,000 attendees.

In 1995, the popularity of the Beastie Boys was underlined when tickets for an arena tour went on sale in the US and Madison Square Garden and Chicago's Rosemont Horizon sold out within 30 minutes. One dollar from each ticket sold went through Milarepa to local charities in each city on the tour. The Beastie Boys toured South America and Southeast Asia for the first time. The band also released Aglio e Olio (Italian for "Garlic and Oil"), a collection of eight songs lasting just 11 minutes harking back to their punk roots, in 1995. The In Sound from Way Out!, a collection of previously released jazz/funk instrumentals, was released on Grand Royal in 1996 with the title and artwork a homage to an album by electronic pop music pioneers Perrey and Kingsley.

In 1992, the Beastie Boys decided to sample portions of the sound recording of "Choir" by James Newton in various renditions of their song "Pass the Mic". The band did not obtain a license from Newton to use the composition. Pursuant to their license from ECM Records, the Beastie Boys digitally sampled the opening six seconds of Newton's sound recording of "Choir", and repeated this six-second sample as a background element throughout their song. Newton brought suit, claiming that the band infringed his copyright in the underlying composition of "Choir". The district court granted the Beastie Boys summary judgment. The district court said that no license was required because the three-note segment of "Choir" lacked the requisite originality and was therefore not copyrightable. The decision was affirmed on appeal.

=== 1998–2001: Hello Nasty ===
The Beastie Boys began work on the album Hello Nasty at the G-Son studios, Los Angeles in 1995, but continued to produce and record it in New York City after Yauch moved to Manhattan in 1996. The album displayed a substantial shift in musical feel, with the addition of Mix Master Mike. The album featured bombastic beats, rap samples, and experimental sounds. Released on July 14, 1998, Hello Nasty earned first week sales of 681,000 in the US and went straight to number 1 in the US, the UK, Germany, Australia, the Netherlands, New Zealand, and Sweden. The album achieved number 2 rank on the charts in Canada and Japan, and reached top-ten chart positions in Austria, Switzerland, Ireland, Belgium, Finland, France and Israel.

The Beastie Boys won two Grammy Awards in 1999, receiving the Grammy Award for Best Alternative Music Album for Hello Nasty as well as the Grammy Award for Best Rap Performance by a Duo or Group for "Intergalactic". This was the first time that a band had won awards in both rap and alternative categories.

At the 1998 MTV Video Music Awards, the Beastie Boys won the Michael Jackson Video Vanguard Award for their contributions to music videos. The following year at the 1999 MTV Video Music Awards, they also won the award for Best Hip Hop Video for their hit song "Intergalactic". The Beastie Boys used their platform and speeches at the VMAs to advocate for political and social change. At the 1998 ceremony, Yauch spoke out against Islamophobia, in the wake of the US Embassy bombings that had occurred in both Kenya and Tanzania a month earlier. At the 1999 ceremony, in the wake of the sexual assaults at Woodstock 99, Horovitz, encouraged by his then-girlfriend Kathleen Hanna, addressed the incidents and encouraged artists to work with security to encourage the safety of women attending their concerts.

The Beastie Boys started an arena tour in 1998. Through Ian C. Rogers, the band made live downloads of their performances available for their fans, but were temporarily thwarted when Capitol Records removed them from its website. The Beastie Boys was one of the first bands to make MP3 downloads available on their website. The group got a high level of response and public awareness as a result including a published article in The Wall Street Journal on the band's efforts.

The Beastie Boys released The Sounds of Science, a two-CD anthology of their works in 1999. This album reached number 19 on the Billboard 200, number 18 in Canada, and number 14 on the R&B/Hip-Hop Albums chart. The one new song, the single "Alive", reached number 11 on the Billboard Modern Rock chart.

In 2000, the Beastie Boys had planned to co-headline the Rhyme and Reason Tour with Rage Against the Machine and Busta Rhymes, but the tour was canceled when Diamond sustained a serious injury due to a bicycle accident. The official diagnosis was fifth-degree acromioclavicular joint dislocation; he needed surgery and extensive rehabilitation. By the time he recovered, Rage Against the Machine had disbanded, although they would reunite seven years later.

Under the name Country Mike, Mike D recorded an album, Country Mike's Greatest Hits, and gave it to friends and family for Christmas in 2000. Adam "Ad-Rock" Horovitz's side project BS 2000 released Simply Mortified in 2001. In October 2001, after the September 11, 2001 attacks, the Beastie Boys organized and headlined the New Yorkers Against Violence Concert at the Hammerstein Ballroom.

=== 2002–2008: To the 5 Boroughs and The Mix-Up ===
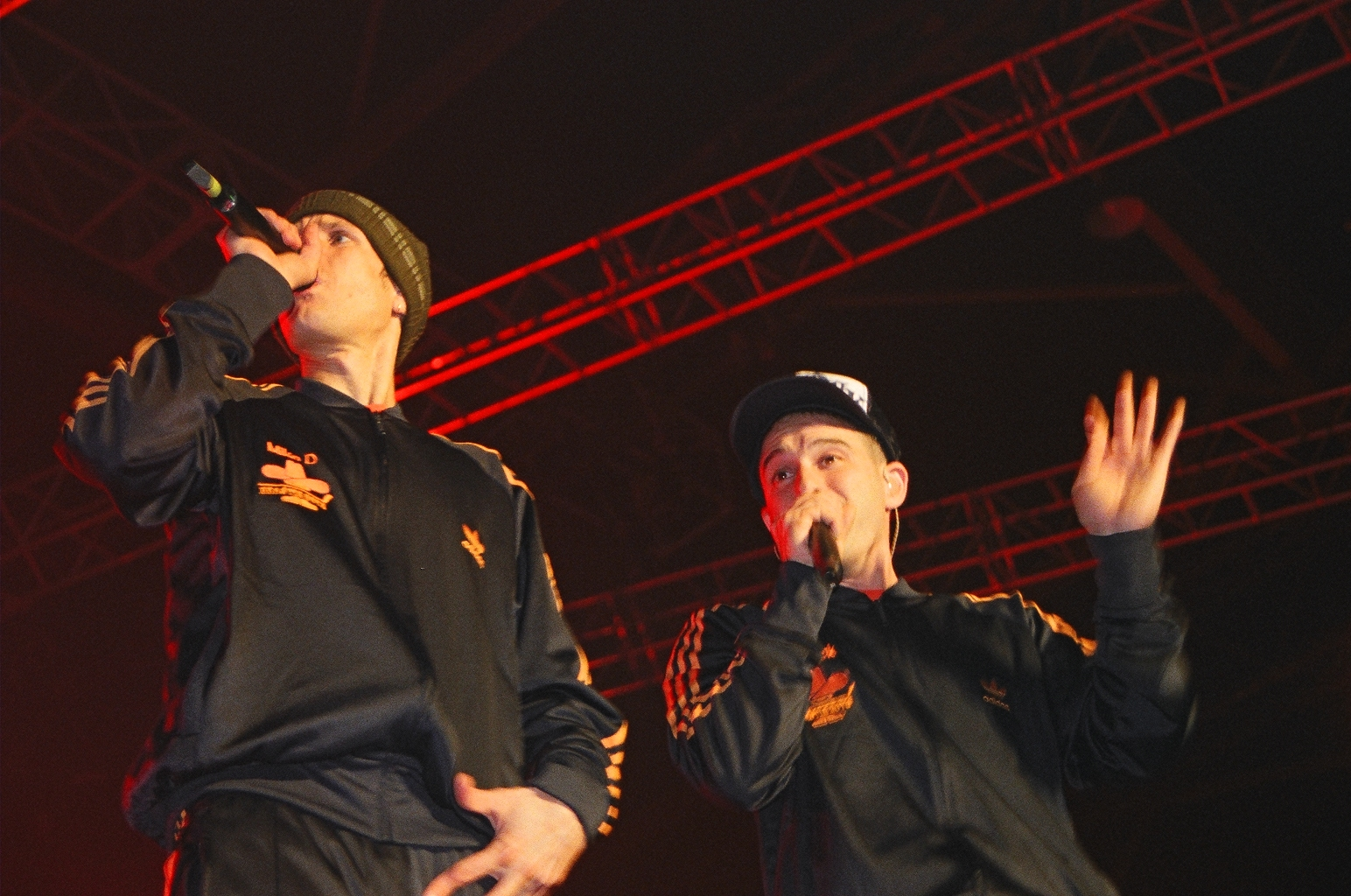
The Beastie Boys at Trans Musicales 2004 in Rennes

In 2002, Adam Yauch started building a new studio facility, Oscilloscope Laboratories, in downtown Manhattan, New York and the band started work on a new album there. The band released a protest song, "In a World Gone Mad", against the 2003 Iraq war as a free download on several websites, including the Milarepa website, the MTV website, MoveOn.org, and Win Without War. The 19th and 20th Tibetan Freedom Concerts were held in Tokyo and Taipei, the Beastie Boys' first Taiwan appearance. The Beastie Boys also headlined the Coachella Valley Music and Arts Festival.

Their single, "Ch-Check It Out", debuted on The O.C. in the season 1 episode "The Vegas", which aired April 28, 2004.

To the 5 Boroughs was released worldwide on June 15, 2004. It was the first album the band produced themselves and reached number 1 on the Billboard albums chart, number 2 in the UK and Australia, and number 3 in Germany. The first single from the album, "Ch-Check It Out", reached number 1 in Canada and on the US Modern Rock Tracks chart.

The album was the cause of some controversy with allegations that it installed spyware when inserted into the CD drive of a computer. The band denied this allegation, defending that there is no copy protection software on the albums sold in the US and UK. While there is Macrovision CDS-200 copy protection software installed on European copies of the album, this is standard practice for all European releases on EMI/Capitol Records released in Europe, and it does not install spyware or any form of permanent software. The band stated in mid-2006 that they were writing material for their next album and would be producing it themselves.

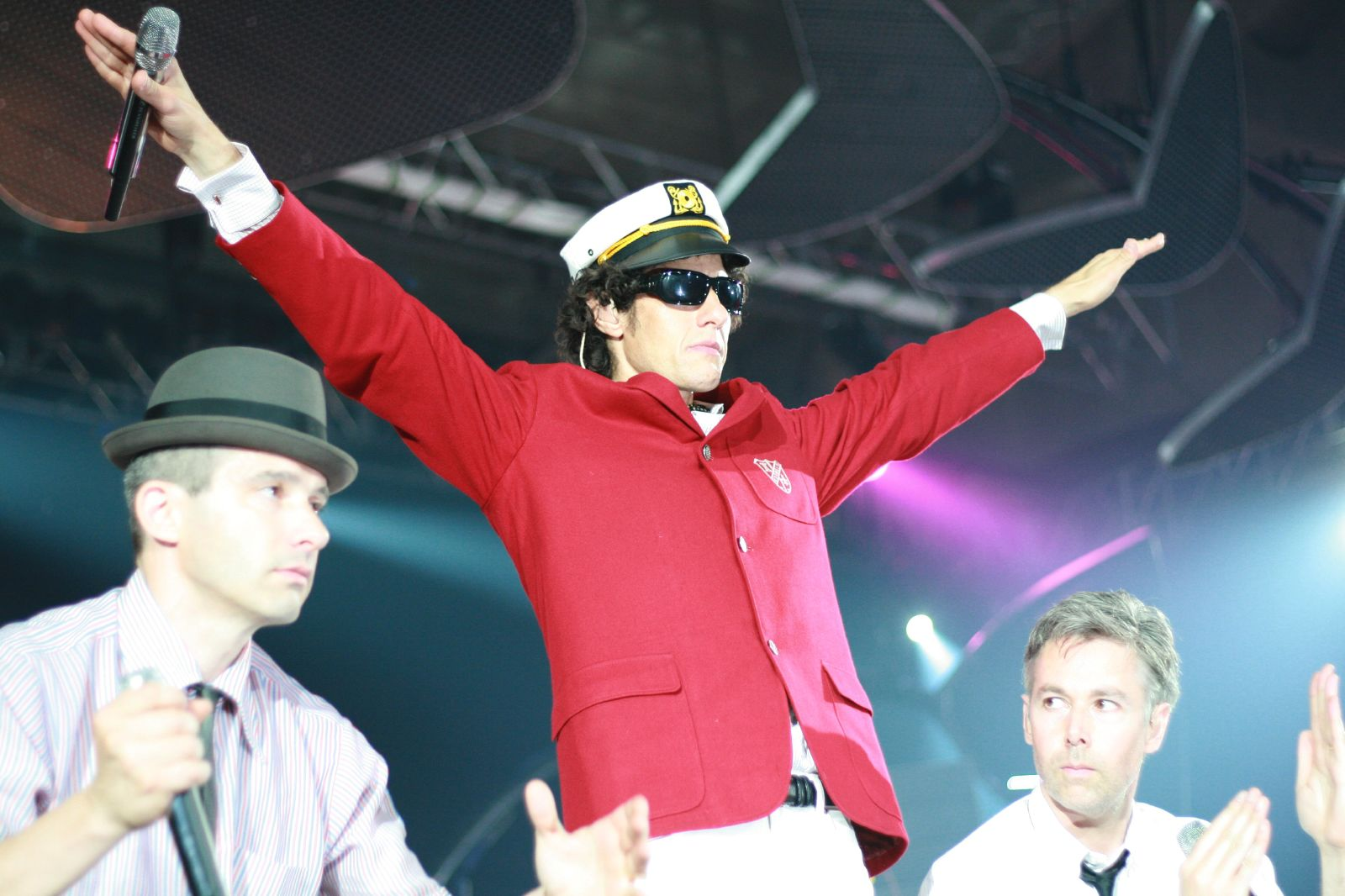
Left to right: Ad-Rock, Mike D, and MCA performing in Barcelona, Spain in September 2007

Speaking to British music weekly NME (April 26, 2007), Diamond revealed that a new album was to be called The Mix-Up. Despite initial confusion regarding whether the album would have lyrics as opposed to being purely instrumental, the Mic-To-Mic blog reported that Capitol Records had confirmed it would be strictly instrumental and erroneously reported a release date scheduled for July 10, 2007. (The album was eventually released June 26, as originally reported.) On May 1, 2007, this was further cemented by an e-mail sent to those on the band's mailing list– explicitly stating that the album would be all instrumental:

OK, here's our blurb about our new album—it spits hot fire!—hot shit! it's official... it's named The Mix-Up. g'wan. all instrumental record. "see I knew they were gonna do that!" that's a quote from you. check the track listing and cover below. you love us. don't you?

The band subsequently confirmed the new album and announced a short tour that focused on festivals as opposed to a traditional tour, including the likes of Sónar (Spain), Roskilde (Denmark), Hurricane/Southside (Germany), Bestival (Isle of Wight), Electric Picnic (Ireland) and Open'er Festival (Poland). The Beastie Boys performed at the UK leg of Live Earth July 7, 2007 at Wembley Stadium, London with "Sabotage", "So What'cha Want", "Intergalactic", and "Sure Shot".

They worked with Reverb, a non-profit environmental organization, on their 2007 summer tour, and headlined the Langerado Music Festival in South Florida on Friday, March 7, 2008. The band won a Grammy for The Mix-Up in the "Best Pop Instrumental Album" category at the 50th Annual Grammy Awards in 2008.

=== 2009–2012: Hot Sauce Committee ===
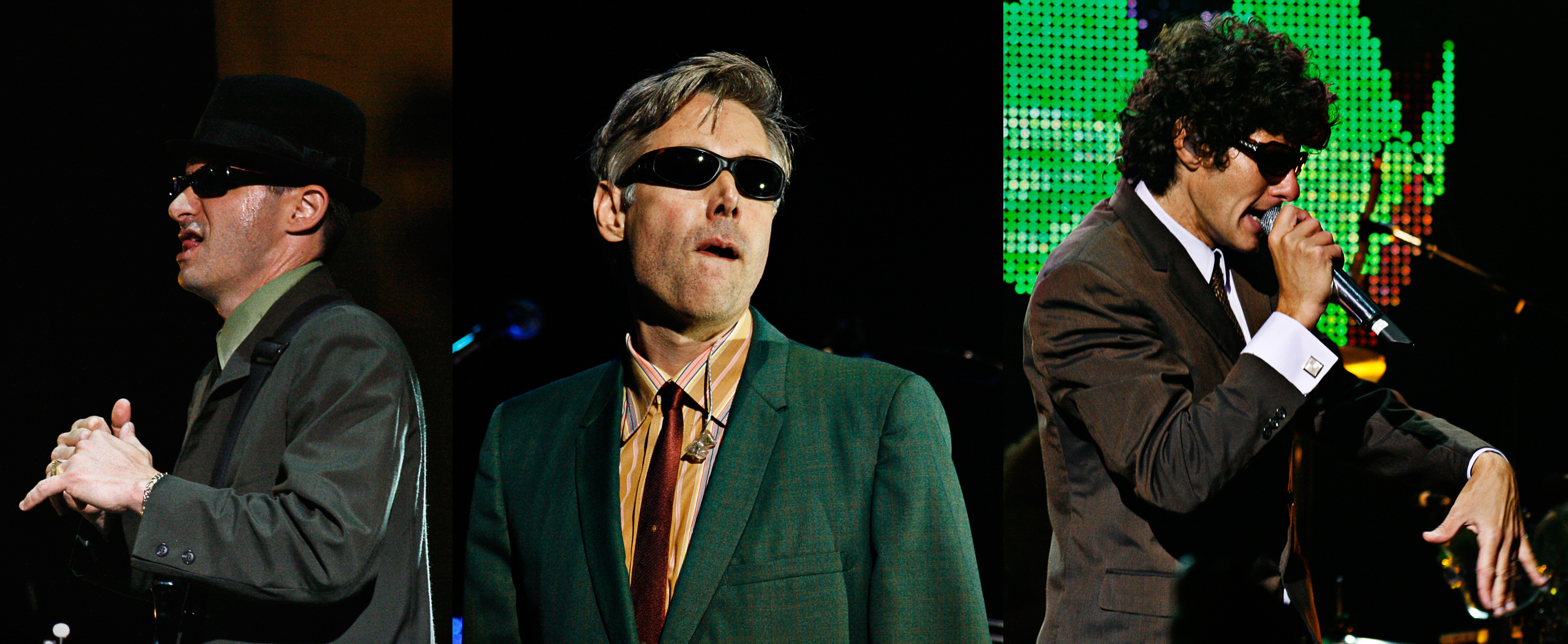
Left to right: Ad-Rock, MCA and Mike D in 2007

In February 2009, Yauch revealed their forthcoming new album had taken the band's sound in a "bizarre" new direction, saying "it's a combination of playing and sampling stuff as we're playing, and also sampling pretty obscure records". The tentative title for the record was Tadlock's Glasses, of which Yauch explained the inspiration behind the title:

We had a bus driver years ago who used to drive Elvis' back up singers. His name was Tadlock and Elvis gave him a pair of glasses which he was very proud of. So for some reason that title—Tadlock's Glasses—has just been bouncing around.

On May 25, 2009, it was announced during an interview on Late Night with Jimmy Fallon that the name of their new album would be Hot Sauce Committee and was set for release on September 15 (with the track listing of the album announced through their mailing list on June 23). The album included a collaboration with Santigold who co-wrote and sang with the band on the track "Don't Play No Game That I Can't Win".

In June, the group appeared at Bonnaroo Music and Arts Festival and performed the new single from the album titled "Too Many Rappers" alongside rapper Nas who appears on the track. It was the last live performance by the Beastie Boys as a trio. The group would have toured the UK later in the year in support of the new record.

Speaking to Drowned in Sound, the Beastie Boys revealed that Part 2 was done. Mike D also hinted it may be released via unusual means:

Pt. 2 is pretty much done. Basically we were making ...Pt 1, had too many songs, so we recorded some more songs. Which sounds bizarre but it actually worked out, because it made it clear to us which songs were going to be on ...Pt 1. Then we had this whole other album of songs: ...Pt 2. ...Pt 1's going to be your regular CD in the stores and to download, but ...Pt 2 is going to be released in...we're still figuring it out, but a different way. More of a 2009 style. You could get in the shower one day and, boom, all of a sudden you're showered with MP3s. Or we might send people a seven-inch every few weeks, so you have a whole box set.

On July 20, Yauch announced on the band's official YouTube channel and through the fan mailing list, the cancellation of several tour dates and the postponement of the new album due to the discovery of a cancerous tumor in his parotid gland and a lymph node. The group also had to cancel their co-headlining gig at the Osheaga Festival in Montreal and another headlining spot for the first night of the All Points West Festival in Jersey City, New Jersey.

In late October 2010, the Beastie Boys sent out two emails regarding the status of Hot Sauce Committee Pts. 1 and 2 to their online mailing list. An email dated October 18 read: "Although we regret to inform you that Hot Sauce Committee Part 1 will continue to be delayed indefinitely, Hot Sauce Committee Part 2 will be released on time as originally planned in spring of 2011." One week later, a second email was sent out, reading as follows:

In what can only be described as a bizarre coincidence, following an exhaustive re-sequence marathon, Beastie Boys have verified that their new Hot Sauce Committee Part 2 will be composed of the same 16 tracks originally slated for inclusion on Hot Sauce Committee Part 1. The record (part 2 that is) will be released as planned in spring 2011 on Capitol. The tracks originally recorded for Hot Sauce Committee Part 2 (which now are actually back on Part 1) have now apparently been bumped to make room for the former Hot Sauce Committee Part 1 material. Wait, what? I know it's weird and confusing, but at least we can say unequivocally that Hot Sauce Committee Part 2 is coming out on time, which is more than I can say about Part 1, and really is all that matters in the end." says Adam "MCA" Yauch. "We just kept working and working on various sequences for part 2, and after a year and half of spending days on end in the sequencing room trying out every possible combination, it finally became clear that this was the only way to make it work. Strange but true, the final sequence for Hot Sauce Committee Part 2 works best with all its songs replaced by the 16 tracks we originally had lined up in pretty much the same order we had them in for Hot Sauce Committee Part 1. So we've come full circle.

The official release dates were April 27, 2011, for Japan; April 29 in the UK and Europe, and May 3, 2011, in the US. The third single for the album "Make Some Noise" was made available for download on April 11, 2011, as well as a limited edition 7-inch vinyl single for Record Store Day five days later with a Passion Pit remix of the track as a b-side. The track was leaked online on April 6 and subsequently made available via their blog.

On April 22, the Beastie Boys emailed out the cryptic message "This Sat, 10:35 am EST – Just listen, listen, listen to the beat box". A day later, they live streamed their album online via beatbox inside Madison Square Garden.

The band was announced as an inductee into the Rock and Roll Hall of Fame in December 2011. They were inducted by Chuck D and LL Cool J on April 14, 2012. Yauch was too sick to attend the ceremony, having been admitted to NewYork–Presbyterian Hospital the same day, therefore the group didn't perform; instead Black Thought, Travie from Gym Class Heroes and Kid Rock performed a medley of their songs. Diamond and Horovitz accepted and read a letter that Yauch had written.

=== 2012–present: Deaths of Yauch and Berry, and disbandment ===
On May 4, 2012, Yauch died from parotid cancer at the age of 47. Mike D told Rolling Stone that the Beastie Boys had recorded new music in late 2011, but did not say if these recordings would be released. He also said that the Beastie Boys would likely disband, though he was open to making new music with Ad-Rock and that "Yauch would genuinely want us to try whatever crazy thing we wanted but never got around to". In June 2014, Mike D confirmed that he and Ad-Rock would no longer make music under the Beastie Boys name.

The founding Beastie Boys guitarist John Berry died on May 19, 2016, aged 52, as a result of frontotemporal dementia, following several years of ill health. He was credited with naming the band and played guitar on the first EP. The first Beastie Boys show took place at Berry's loft.

Yauch's will forbids the use of Beastie Boys music in advertisements. In June 2014, the Beastie Boys won a lawsuit against Monster Energy for using portions of "Sabotage", "So What'cha Want", "Make Some Noise" and "Looking Down the Barrel of a Gun" in a commercial without permission. They were awarded $1.7 million in damages and $668,000 for legal fees.

In October 2018, Mike D and Ad-Rock released a memoir, Beastie Boys Book, recounting events throughout the group's history. The book was adapted into a live show, later released as a documentary in April 2020, Beastie Boys Story. It was directed by the band's longtime collaborator Spike Jonze and premiered on Apple TV+. The book and documentary were accompanied by the compilation album Beastie Boys Music, released in October 2020. The remaining members of the band took on other projects; Horovitz played for Bridget Everett's back-up band, as well as acting roles, and Diamond hosted a radio show and released his solo album, Thank You, in 2026.

== Activism ==
In 1994, Yauch and activist Erin Potts organized the Tibetan Freedom Concert to raise awareness of China's human rights violations in Tibet; Yauch became aware of this after speaking with Tibetan refugees while hiking in Nepal. The events became annual, and shortly after went international with acts such as Live, Mike Mills and Michael Stipe of R.E.M., Rage Against the Machine, the Smashing Pumpkins, and U2.

== Musical style and influences ==
Originally a hardcore punk band, the Beastie Boys had largely abandoned the genre in favor of hip-hop and rap rock by the time work began on their debut studio album, Licensed to Ill. The group mixed elements of hip-hop, punk, funk, electro, jazz and Latin music into their music. They have also been described as alternative hip-hop and punk rap.

== Legacy and influence ==
Around the time of the release of their debut album, Licensed to Ill, Mike D started to appear on stage and in publicity photographs wearing a large Volkswagen emblem attached to a chain-link necklace. This started a rash of thefts of the emblem from vehicles around the world as fans tried to emulate him. A controversial concert in Columbus, Georgia, in 1987 led to the passage of a lewdness ordinance in that city.

The Beastie Boys are influential in the hip-hop and rock music scenes, with artists such as Eminem, Rage Against the Machine, Hed PE, Limp Bizkit, Sublime, and Blur citing them as an influence. In the 2022 book What's That Sound?: An Introduction to Rock Music and Its History, music journalists Andrew Flory and John Covach surmised "perhaps the Beastie Boys will prove to be the Elvises of rap—the inevitable white catalysts necessary for exploding black music innovations into Anglo ears."

The Beastie Boys have had four albums reach the top of the Billboard album charts (Licensed to Ill, Ill Communication, Hello Nasty and To the 5 Boroughs) since 1986. In the November 2004 issue, Rolling Stone named "Sabotage" the 475th song on their 500 Greatest Songs of All Time list. In their April 2005 issue, Rolling Stone ranked them number 77 on their list of the 100 Greatest Artists of All Time. VH1 ranked them number 89 on their list of their 100 Greatest Artists of All Time. On September 27, 2007, it was announced that the Beastie Boys were one of the nine nominees for the 2008 Rock and Roll Hall of Fame Inductions. In December 2011, they were announced to be official 2012 inductees.

The Beastie Boys have many high-profile longtime fans, including Ultimate Fighting Championship (UFC) president Dana White, who has a bass guitar signed by all three members and a copy of Beastie Boys Book in his office. Speaking on the death of Adam Yauch, White said, "I seriously haven't been impacted by a death in a long time like I was with the Beastie Boys". Actor Seth Rogen, who appeared in the video for "Make Some Noise", also said, "I'm a huge Beastie Boys fan and they just called and asked if I wanted to be a part of it, and I said yes without hesitation. I didn't need to hear anything. I didn't need to see anything, any concepts. I was just like, 'I will literally do anything you ask me to do'". Ben Stiller was seen in the crowd for the DVD release Awesome; I Fuckin' Shot That! and featured Horovitz in his movie While We're Young, where he said, "I'm a huge Beastie Boys fan, so doing that, for me, was beyond anything". Eminem was highly influenced by the Beastie Boys and cited them alongside LL Cool J as being the reason he got into rap. During an interview with MTV after the death of Yauch, he said, "Adam Yauch brought a lot of positivity into the world and I think it's obvious to anyone how big of an influence the Beastie Boys were on me and so many others. They are trailblazers and pioneers and Adam will be sorely missed. My thoughts and prayers are with his family, Mike D., and Ad-Rock." His album cover for Kamikaze paid homage to Licensed to Ill and he also paid homage in his "Berzerk" video. In an interview with Rolling Stone, Beavis and Butt-Head creator Mike Judge acknowledged he was a fan of the band, citing his favorite song as "Fight for Your Right", as the Beastie Boys appeared on Beavis and Butt-Head on numerous occasions. Kid Rock wrote an in-depth tribute to Yauch after being influenced by the band, which said, "I thought I was the 4th member of Beastie Boys in 7th grade. You couldn't tell me I wasn't. The first time I ever saw them on stage was a very early show of theirs before Licensed to Ill came out, opening for Run DMC at Joe Louis Arena. My jaw dropped to the floor!" In 2020, Spin ranked the Beastie Boys as the 12th-most influential artist of the previous 35 years.

== Tributes ==
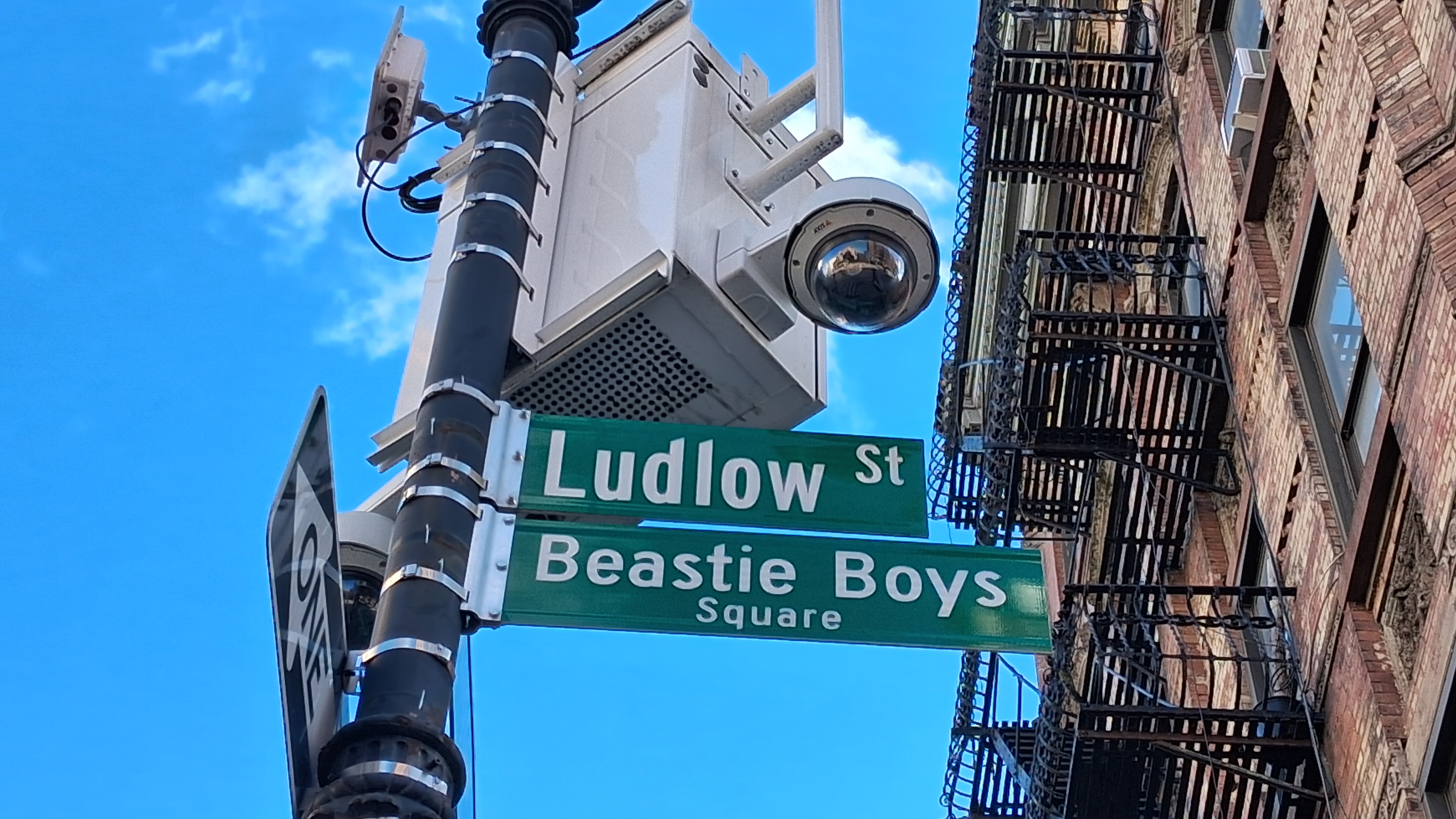
Beastie Boys Square in New York City, where the cover of Paul's Boutique was shot.

The Onion paid homage to Yauch with the headline "Following Death of Adam Yauch, Grieving China Frees Tibet".

In 2022, the New York City Council voted to rename the intersection of Ludlow and Rivington streets in Manhattan's Lower East Side—the location of the Paul's Boutique album cover—"Beastie Boys Square". The vote was the result of a grassroots campaign started in 2013 by historian LeRoy McCarthy. The renaming was voted down when first proposed in 2014, but it passed on July 14, 2022. The square was renamed on September 9, 2023, coinciding with the 50th anniversary of hip-hop.

== Sampling legal case ==
In 2003, the Beastie Boys were involved in the landmark sampling decision Newton v. Diamond. In that case, a federal judge ruled that the band was not liable for sampling James Newton's "Choir" in their track "Pass the Mic". The sample used is the six-second flute stab. In short, the Beastie Boys cleared the sample but obtained only the rights to use the sound recording and not the composition rights to the song "Choir". In the decision, the judge found that:

when viewed in relation to Newton's composition as a whole, the portion is neither quantitatively nor qualitatively significant ... Because Beastie Boys' use of the sound recording was authorized, the sole basis of Newton's infringement action is his remaining copyright interest in the 'Choir' composition. We hold today that Beastie Boys' use of a brief segment of that composition, consisting of three notes separated by a half-step over a background C note, is not sufficient to sustain a claim for copyright infringement.

== Members ==
Members

- Mike D – vocals (1981–2012), drums (1991–2012)
- Kate Schellenbach – drums, percussion, backing vocals (1981–1984)
- John Berry – guitars (1981–1982; died 2016)
- MCA – vocals (1981–2012; his death), bass (1981–1984, 1991–2012)
- Ad-Rock – vocals (1982–2012), guitars (1982–1984, 1991–2012)

Touring musicians

- DJ Double R (Rick Rubin) – disc jockey (1984–1985)
- Sam Sever – disc jockey (1986)
- Doctor Dré – disc jockey (1986)
- DJ Hurricane – disc jockey, backing vocals (1986–1997)
- Eric Bobo – percussion, drums (1992–1996)
- Money Mark (Mark Ramos-Nishita) – keyboards, vocals (1992–2012)
- Amery "AWOL" Smith – drums, backing vocals, percussion (1992–1998)
- Alfredo Ortiz – drums, percussion (1996–2012)
- Mix Master Mike – disc jockey, backing vocals (1998–2012)

== Discography ==
Studio albums

- Licensed to Ill (1986)
- Paul's Boutique (1989)
- Check Your Head (1992)
- Ill Communication (1994)
- Hello Nasty (1998)
- To the 5 Boroughs (2004)
- The Mix-Up (2007)
- Hot Sauce Committee Part Two (2011)

== Tours ==
- The Virgin Tour (1985) (supporting Madonna)
- Raising Hell Tour (1986) (supporting Run-D.M.C.)
- Licensed to Ill Tour (1987) (with Public Enemy)
- Together Forever Tour (1987) (with Run-D.M.C.)
- Check Your Head Tour (1992) (with Cypress Hill, Rollins Band, Firehose, and Basehead)
- Lollapalooza (1994)
- Ill Communication Tour (1994–1995)
- In the Round Tour (1998–1999) (with A Tribe Called Quest and Money Mark)
- To the 5 Boroughs Tour (2004)
- The Mix-Up Tour (2007–2008)

== Awards and nominations ==
Grammy Awards

Year	Nominee / work	Award	Result
1992	Check Your Head	Best Rap Performance by a Duo or Group	Nominated
1995	"Sabotage"	Best Hard Rock Performance	Nominated
1999	"Intergalactic"	Best Rap Performance by a Duo or Group	Won
1999	Hello Nasty	Best Alternative Music Album	Won
2001	"Alive"	Best Rap Performance by a Duo or Group	Nominated
2005	"Ch-Check It Out"	Best Rap Performance by a Duo or Group	Nominated
2005	To The 5 Boroughs	Best Rap Album	Nominated
2008	"Off the Grid"	Best Pop Instrumental Performance	Nominated
2008	The Mix-Up	Best Contemporary Instrumental Album	Won
2010	"Too Many Rappers" (featuring Nas)	Best Rap Performance by a Duo or Group	Nominated

MTV Video Music Awards

Year	Nominee / work	Award	Result
1994	"Sabotage"	Video of the Year	Nominated
1994	"Sabotage"	Best Group Video	Nominated
1994	"Sabotage"	Breakthrough Video	Nominated
1994	"Sabotage"	Best Direction (Director: Spike Jonze)	Nominated
1994	"Sabotage"	Viewer's Choice	Nominated
1998	Beastie Boys	Michael Jackson Video Vanguard Award	Won
1999	"Intergalactic"	Best Hip-Hop Video	Won
2009	"Sabotage"	Best Video (That Should Have Won a Moonman)	Won
2011	"Make Some Noise"	Video of the Year	Nominated
2011	"Make Some Noise"	Best Direction (Director: Adam Yauch)	Won

MTV Europe Music Awards

Year	Nominee / work	Award	Result
1994	Beastie Boys	Best Group	Nominated
1998	"Intergalactic"	Best Video	Nominated
1998	Hello Nasty	Best Album	Nominated
1998	Beastie Boys	Best Group	Nominated
1998	Beastie Boys	Best Hip-Hop	Won
1999	Beastie Boys	Best Hip-Hop	Nominated
2004	Beastie Boys	Best Group	Nominated
2004	Beastie Boys	Best Hip-Hop	Nominated
2011	"Make Some Noise"	Best Video	Nominated

MTV Video Music Awards Japan

Year	Nominee / work	Award	Result
2005	"Ch-Check It Out"	Best Hip-Hop Video	Won
2009	Beastie Boys	MTV Street Icon Award	Won

== Filmography ==
- Beastie (1982)
- Krush Groove (1985)
- Tougher Than Leather (1988)
- Futurama episode "Hell Is Other Robots" (1999)
- Awesome; I Fuckin' Shot That! (2006)
- Fight for Your Right Revisited (2011)
- Beastie Boys Story (2020)
- The Best Summer (2026)
