= Ad-Rock =

American rapper, guitarist, and actor (born 1966)

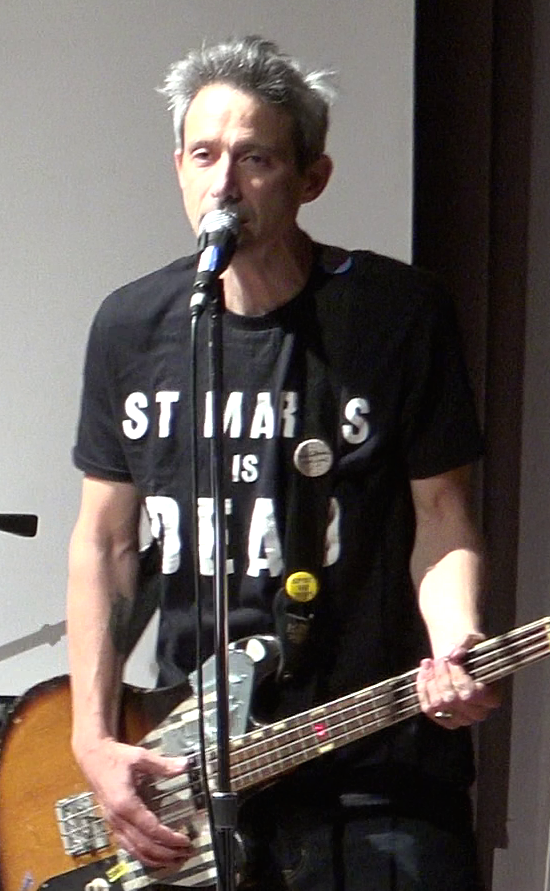
- Ad-Rock in 2015

Background information
- Also known as: King Ad-Rock; Shadrach
- Born: Adam Keefe Horovitz; October 31, 1966 (age 60); New York City, U.S.
- Genres: Hip-hop; rap rock; hardcore punk; alternative hip hop
- Occupations: Rapper; musician; songwriter; actor
- Instruments: Vocals; guitar; keyboards; bass; drums; sampler; turntables
- Years active: 1982–present
- Formerly of: Beastie Boys; BS 2000; Dead Fucking Last; The Young and the Useless
- Spouses: Ione Leitch (m. 1992; div. 1999); Kathleen Hanna (m. 2006)

Adam Keefe Horovitz (born October 31, 1966), known professionally as Ad-Rock, is an American rapper, guitarist, and actor. He was a member of the hip-hop group the Beastie Boys. While the Beastie Boys were active, Horovitz performed with a side project, BS 2000. Since the group's dissolution, Horovitz has participated in several Beastie Boys projects, worked as a remixer, producer, and guest musician for other artists, and acted in a number of films.

== Early life and education ==
Horovitz was born on October 31, 1966, and raised on Park Avenue, Manhattan, New York City, the son of playwright Israel Horovitz and his second wife, Doris (née Keefe). He has two full siblings, Rachael and Matthew, and three half-siblings; Julie, from his father's first marriage, and Hannah and Oliver, from his father's third marriage. His father was Jewish, whereas his mother, who was of Irish descent, was Catholic. He had a secular upbringing. Horovitz briefly attended Brooklyn Technical High School, before switching to the McBurney School, which he dropped out of around the time he began pursuing music. His mother died in 1985, shortly before the release of the Beastie Boys' debut album.

== Career ==
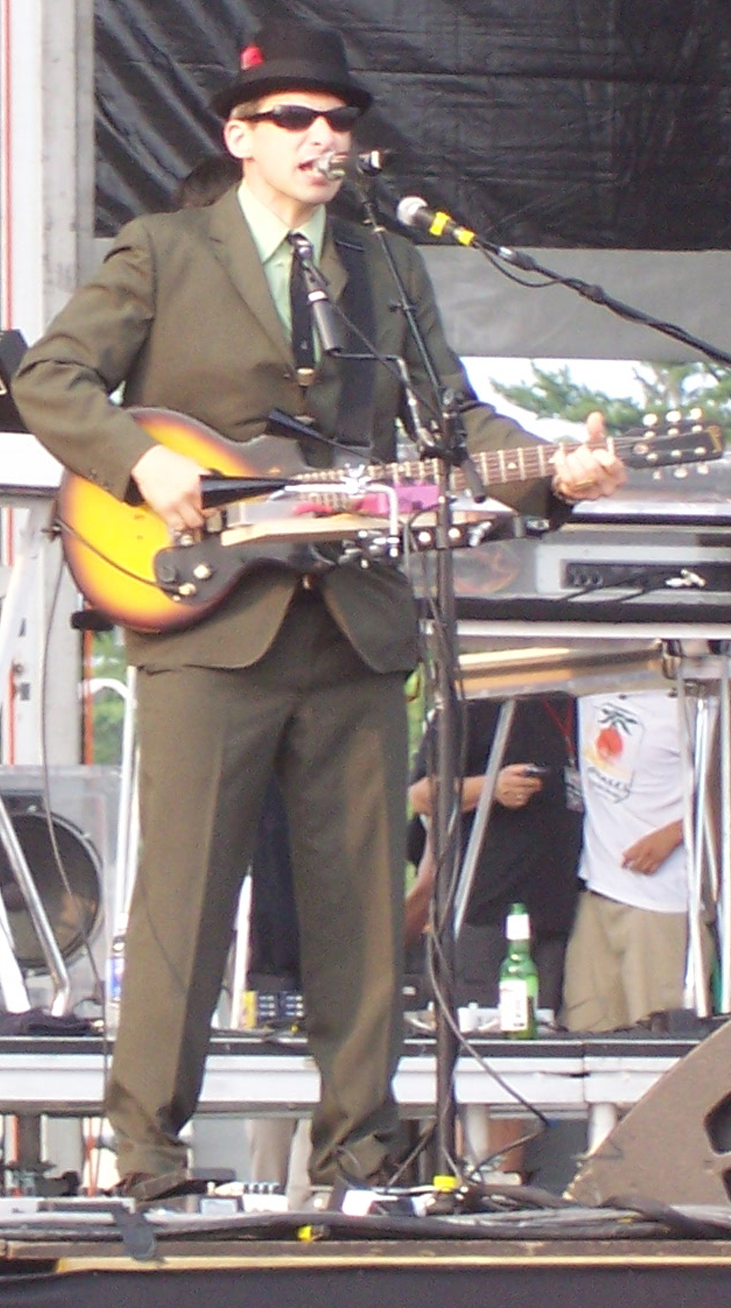
Horovitz in 2007

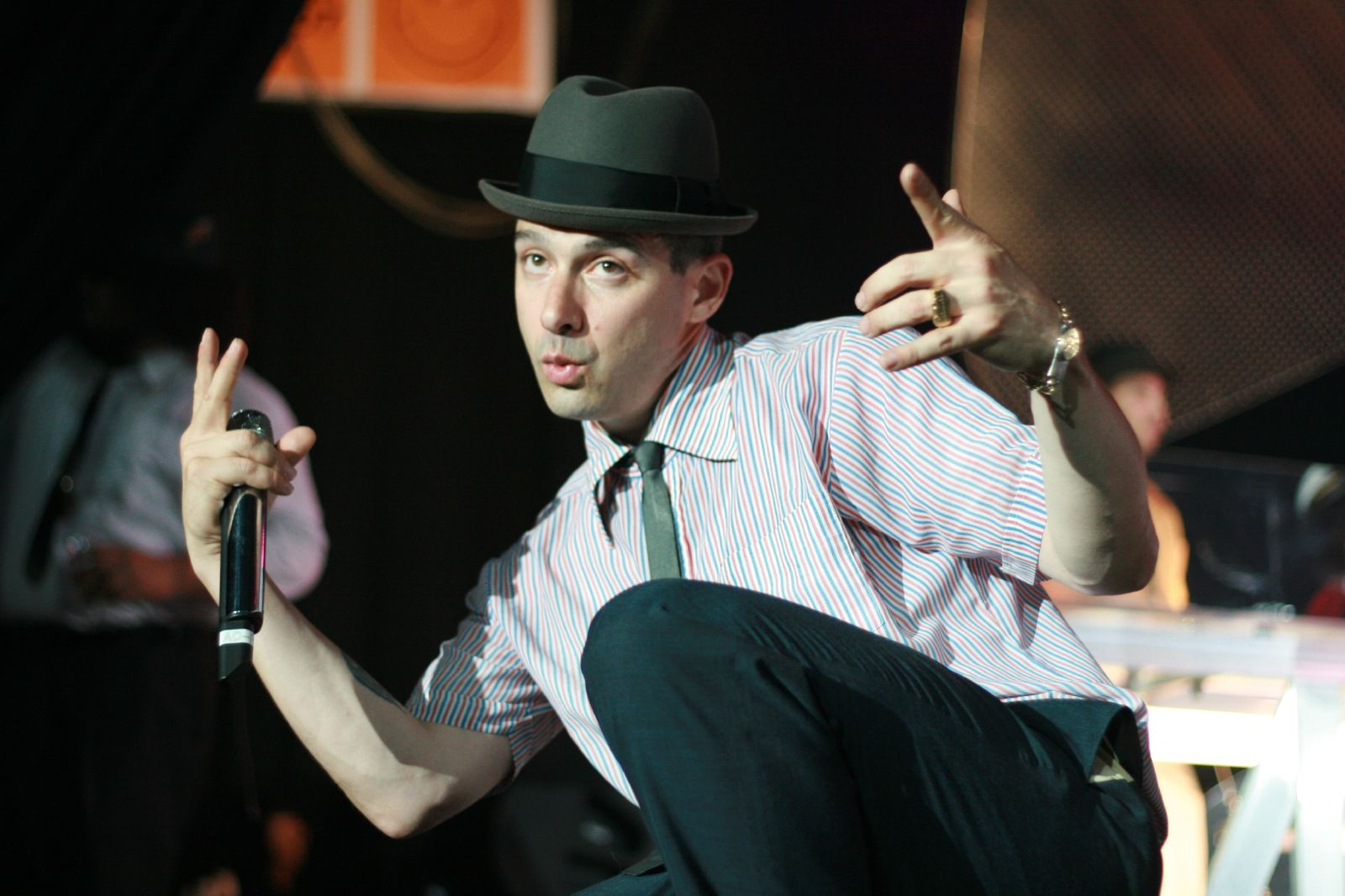
Horovitz with the Beastie Boys in Barcelona, Spain, on September 5, 2007

Horovitz began his music career with a stint in the punk rock band The Young and the Useless, who often performed with the Beastie Boys. In 1982, the Beastie Boys' guitarist, John Berry, quit and was replaced by Horovitz, who was 16 at the time. After Horovitz joined, the Beastie Boys changed their sound, evolving from a hardcore punk band to a more of a hip-hop group. With the departure of Kate Schellenbach, the group's final lineup consisted of Horovitz, Adam Yauch and Michael Diamond. The band was signed to Def Jam, and released its debut album, Licensed to Ill, in 1986. The album was a huge commercial success and spawned six singles, of which one, "(You Gotta) Fight for Your Right (To Party!)", reached the top 20 of the US Hot 100 (US #7). The album was certified diamond several years later. The group would go on to release seven studio albums and form their own label Grand Royal. By 2010, the Beastie Boys had sold 40 million albums worldwide, including 22 million in the U.S. In 2012, the Beastie Boys were inducted into the Rock and Roll Hall of Fame. Shortly after, the group dissolved due to Yauch's death. Their final live performance was at Bonnaroo 2009.

In addition to his work with the Beastie Boys, Horovitz remixes numerous tracks for other artists under the alias 41 Small Stars. He plays bass in the Tender Moments, the backing band of New York-based cabaret performer Bridget Everett.

Horovitz has acted in several motion pictures and television shows. His roles include Tim "Chino" Doolan in Lost Angels (1989), Sam in Roadside Prophets (1992), Repulski in Godspeed (2007), Fletcher in While We're Young (2014), and Nick in Golden Exits (2017). He also had cameos and guest spots in Futurama, 30 Rock, The Equalizer (1985), Krush Groove (1985), and A Kiss Before Dying (1991). In 2020, he appeared in the documentary Have a Good Trip after previously having appeared in his wife's documentary The Punk Singer.

== Personal life ==
In the late 1980s, Horovitz was in a relationship with the American actress Molly Ringwald. They met on the set of The Pick-up Artist. Horovitz was married to actress Ione Skye Leitch from 1992 to 1999. She is mentioned in the song "Get It Together". They separated in 1995, got back together in 1996, and separated again that year. They divorced in 2000.

After his separation in 1996, he began a relationship with the riot grrrl musician and frontwoman of Bikini Kill, Kathleen Hanna; they married in 2006. Horovitz appeared prominently in The Punk Singer, a 2013 documentary film about Hanna's life and career, and even shot some scenes. Horovitz and Hanna adopted a son in 2013.

Horovitz began to wear a medical alert bracelet after having a tonic–clonic seizure in 2003. Horovitz has been close friends with the actress Nadia Dajani since childhood; the two attended elementary school together.

As of 2026, Horovitz lives in Pasadena, California.

== Discography ==
with the Beastie Boys

- Licensed to Ill (1986)
- Paul's Boutique (1989)
- Check Your Head (1992)
- Ill Communication (1994)
- Hello Nasty (1998)
- To the 5 Boroughs (2004)
- The Mix-Up (2007)
- Hot Sauce Committee Part Two (2011)

with BS 2000

- BS 2000 (1997)
- Simply Mortified (2000)

== Filmography ==
Film and Television credits
Year	Title	Role	Notes
1982	Beastie	Himself	Documentary Film
1985	Krush Groove	Himself	Film
1985	The Equalizer	Ronald Baines	Episode: "Mama's Boy"
1988	Tougher Than Leather	Himself	Film
1989	Lost Angels	Tim "Chino" Doolan	Film
1991	A Kiss Before Dying	Jay Faraday	Film
1992	Roadside Prophets	Sam	Film
1999	Futurama	Himself	Episode: "Hell Is Other Robots"
2007	Godspeed	Repulski	Short Film
2011	Fight For Your Right Revisited	Cop Number One	Short Film
2013	The Punk Singer	Himself	Documentary Film
2014	While We're Young	Fletcher	Film
2015	808	Himself	Documentary Film
2017	Golden Exits	Nick	Film
2018	Bad Reputation	Himself	Documentary Film
2020	Beastie Boys Story	Himself	Documentary Film
TBA	Time Out		Film; filming
