= Beastie Boys Music =

Compilation album by Beastie Boys
- Released: October 23, 2020
- Recorded: 1986–2009
- Genres: Rap rock; hip-hop
- Length: 71:26
- Label: Universal Music Enterprises
- Producers: Beastie Boys; Rick Rubin; Dust Brothers; Mario Caldato Jr.

Beastie Boys chronology
Hot Sauce Committee Part Two (2011)	Beastie Boys Music (2020)

Beastie Boys Music is a compilation album by the American hip-hop group Beastie Boys, released on October 23, 2020.

== Critical reception ==
Professional ratings
Review scores
Source	Rating
AllMusic	4.5/5 stars
Spill Magazine	8/10

AllMusic reviewer Stephen Thomas Erlewine said Beastie Boys Music is a superior compilation to Solid Gold Hits and wrote that it "has all the major items, presented in a lively fashion".

== Track listing ==
No.	Title	Writer(s)	Producer(s)	Length
1.	"So What'cha Want" (from Check Your Head, 1992)	Michael Diamond; Adam Horovitz; Adam Yauch	Beastie Boys; Mario Caldato Jr.	3:36
2.	"Paul Revere" (from Licensed to Ill, 1986)	Diamond; Horovitz; Rick Rubin; Yauch	Rick Rubin; Beastie Boys	3:41
3.	"Shake Your Rump" (from Paul's Boutique, 1989)	Diamond; Horovitz; Yauch; Matt Dike; John King; Mike Simpson	Beastie Boys; Dust Brothers	3:19
4.	"Make Some Noise" (from Hot Sauce Committee Part Two, 2011)	Diamond; Horovitz; Yauch	Beastie Boys	3:40
5.	"Sure Shot" (from Ill Communication, 1994)	Diamond; Horovitz; Yauch; Wendell Fite; Caldato Jr.; Jeremy Steig	Beastie Boys; Mario Caldato Jr.	3:20
6.	"Intergalactic" (from Hello Nasty, 1998)	Diamond; Horovitz; Yauch; Caldato Jr.	Beastie Boys; Mario Caldato Jr.	3:51
7.	"Ch-Check It Out" (from To the 5 Boroughs, 2004)	Diamond; Horovitz; Yauch	Beastie Boys	3:12
8.	"(You Gotta) Fight for Your Right (To Party!)" (from Licensed to Ill, 1986)	Diamond; Horovitz; Rubin; Yauch	Rick Rubin; Beastie Boys	3:20
9.	"Pass the Mic" (from Check Your Head, 1992)	Diamond; Horovitz; Yauch; Caldato Jr.	Beastie Boys; Mario Caldato Jr.	4:16
10.	"Don't Play No Game That I Can't Win" (featuring Santigold) (from Hot Sauce Committee Part Two, 2011)	Diamond; Horovitz; Yauch; Santi White	Beastie Boys	4:11
11.	"Body Movin'" (from Hello Nasty, 1998)	Diamond; Horovitz; Yauch; Caldato Jr.	Beastie Boys; Mario Caldato Jr.	3:09
12.	"Sabotage" (from Ill Communication, 1994)	Diamond; Horovitz; Yauch	Beastie Boys; Mario Caldato Jr.	2:58
13.	"Hold It Now, Hit It" (from Licensed to Ill, 1986)	Diamond; Horovitz; Rubin; Yauch	Rick Rubin; Beastie Boys	3:27
14.	"Shadrach" (from Paul's Boutique, 1989)	Diamond; Horovitz; Yauch; Dike; King; Simpson	Beastie Boys; Dust Brothers	4:08
15.	"Root Down" (from Ill Communication, 1994)	Diamond; Horovitz; Yauch	Beastie Boys; Mario Caldato Jr.	3:32
16.	"Brass Monkey" (from Licensed to Ill, 1986)	Diamond; Horovitz; Rubin; Yauch	Rick Rubin; Beastie Boys	2:37
17.	"Get It Together" (featuring Q-Tip) (from Ill Communication, 1994)	Diamond; Horovitz; Yauch; Jonathan Davis	Beastie Boys; Mario Caldato Jr.	4:05
18.	"Jimmy James" (Single Version) (from Check Your Head, 1992)	Diamond; Horovitz; Yauch; Caldato Jr.; Ed Chalpin	Beastie Boys; Mario Caldato Jr.	3:04
19.	"Hey Ladies" (from Paul's Boutique, 1989)	Diamond; Horovitz; Yauch; Dike; King; Simpson; Ronald Ford; Barbarella Bishop; Garry M. Shider; Linda Shider	Beastie Boys; Dust Brothers	3:47
20.	"No Sleep till Brooklyn" (from Licensed to Ill, 1986)	Diamond; Horovitz; Rubin; Yauch	Rick Rubin; Beastie Boys	4:09

Note: The 2 vinyl version reordered the songs into chronological order.

== Personnel ==
Beastie Boys

- Ad-Rock
- MCA
- Mike D

Guest musicians

- Q-Tip on "Get It Together"
- Santigold on "Don't Play No Game That I Can't Win"

Production

- Beastie Boys – production (all tracks)
- Rick Rubin – production ("Fight for Your Right", "Brass Monkey", "No Sleep till Brooklyn", "Paul Revere", and "Hold It Now, Hit It")
- Dust Brothers – production ("Shake Your Rump", "Shadrach", and "Hey Ladies")
- Mario Caldato Jr. – production ("Pass the Mic", "So What'cha Want", "Jimmy James", "Sure Shot", "Root Down", "Sabotage", "Get It Together", "Body Movin'", and "Intergalactic")

== Charts ==
Chart performance for Beastie Boys Music
Chart (2020)	Peak position
US Billboard 200	64
US Top R&B/Hip-Hop Albums (Billboard)	34
US Top Rock Albums (Billboard)	12
