= Beastie Boys Anthology: The Sounds of Science =

Compilation album by Beastie Boys
- Released: November 23, 1999
- Recorded: 1982–1999
- Genres: Alternative hip-hop; alternative rock; hardcore punk; jazz fusion
- Length: 124:10
- Label: Grand Royal
- Producer: Mario Caldato Jr.

Beastie Boys chronology
Scientists of Sound (The Blow Up Factor Vol. 1) (1999)	Beastie Boys Anthology: The Sounds of Science (1999)	To the 5 Boroughs (2004)

Singles from Beastie Boys Anthology: The Sounds of Science
- 1. "Alive" Released: October 19, 1999

Professional ratings
Review scores
Source	Rating
AllMusic	4/5 stars
Christgau’s Consumer Guide	A−
Entertainment Weekly	A+
Rolling Stone	3.5/5 stars
Tom Hull – on the Web	A−

Beastie Boys Anthology: The Sounds of Science is the first anthology album by American rap rock group Beastie Boys composed of greatest hits, B-sides, and previously unreleased tracks. The retail release comes with a tri-fold sleeve that displays the majority of the band's album covers, as well as a booklet of liner notes. The title of the anthology is from the song of the same name, featured on their second album, Paul's Boutique. The title was actually submitted by Grand Royal Records employee Kenny "Tick" Salcido to the band, and the title was chosen for the anthology.

Customers could also purchase through mail order a custom version of the album from Grand Royal featuring the B-sides and rarities.

== Track listing ==
Disc One
No.	Title	Writer(s)	Original source	Length
1.	"Beastie Boys"	Michael Diamond; Adam Yauch; John Berry; Kate Schellenbach	Polly Wog Stew	0:56
2.	"Slow and Low"	Beastie Boys; Joseph Simmons; Darryl McDaniels; Rick Rubin; Daniel Hayden	Licensed to Ill	3:38
3.	"Shake Your Rump"	Beastie Boys; Matt Dike; John King; Michael Simpson	Paul's Boutique	3:19
4.	"Gratitude"	Beastie Boys; Tom Cushman	Check Your Head	2:45
5.	"Skills to Pay the Bills"	Beastie Boys	"So What'cha Want" single	3:13
6.	"Root Down"	Beastie Boys; Mario Caldato Jr.; Mark Nishita	Ill Communication	3:32
7.	"Believe Me"	Beastie Boys; Amery Smith	Aglio e Olio	1:19
8.	"Sure Shot"	Beastie Boys; M. Caldato Jr.; Wendell Fite; Jeremy Steig	Ill Communication	3:20
9.	"Body Movin'" (Fatboy Slim Remix)	Beastie Boys; M. Caldato Jr.; Tito Puente	"Body Movin'" single	5:31
10.	"Boomin' Granny"	Beastie Boys	"Jimmy James" single	2:18
11.	"Fight for Your Right"	Beastie Boys; R. Rubin	Licensed to Ill	3:27
12.	"Country Mike's Theme"	Beastie Boys	Country Mike's Greatest Hits	0:35
13.	"Pass the Mic"	Beastie Boys; M. Caldato Jr.	Check Your Head	4:17
14.	"Something's Got to Give"	Beastie Boys; M. Caldato Jr.; M. Nishita	Check Your Head	3:28
15.	"Bodhisattva Vow"	Beastie Boys; M. Caldato Jr.	Ill Communication	3:12
16.	"Sabrosa"	Beastie Boys; Eric Correa; M. Nishita	Ill Communication	3:31
17.	"Song for the Man"	Beastie Boys	Hello Nasty	3:11
18.	"Soba Violence"	Beastie Boys; A. Smith	Aglio e Olio (Japanese)	1:14
19.	"Alive"	Beastie Boys	Previously unreleased	3:48
20.	"Jimmy James" (Original Version)	Beastie Boys; M. Caldato Jr.; Ed Chalpin	"Jimmy James" single	3:05
21.	"Three MC's and One DJ" (Live Video Version)	Beastie Boys; M. Caldato Jr.; W. Fite; Michael Schwartz	Remote Control / 3 MCs & 1 DJ single	2:18

Disc Two
No.	Title	Writer(s)	Original Album	Length
1.	"The Biz vs. the Nuge"	Marcel Hall; Ted Nugent	Check Your Head	0:33
2.	"Sabotage"	Beastie Boys	Ill Communication	2:59
3.	"Shadrach"	Beastie Boys; M. Dike; J. King; M. Simpson	Paul's Boutique	4:10
4.	"Brass Monkey"	Beastie Boys; R. Rubin	Licensed to Ill	2:37
5.	"Time for Livin'"	Noah Evans; Miles Kelly; Sylvester Stewart	Check Your Head	1:48
6.	"Dub the Mic"	Beastie Boys; M. Caldato Jr.	"Pass the Mic" single	3:01
7.	"Benny and the Jets"	Elton John; Bernie Taupin	Previously unreleased	4:06
8.	"The Negotiation Limerick File"	Beastie Boys; M. Caldato Jr.	Hello Nasty	2:52
9.	"I Want Some"	Beastie Boys; A. Smith	Aglio e Olio	2:00
10.	"She's on It"	Adam Horovitz; R. Rubin	Krush Groove soundtrack	4:18
11.	"Son of Neckbone"	Beastie Boys; E. Correa; M. Nishita	"Sure Shot" single	3:19
12.	"Get It Together"	Beastie Boys; Jonathan Davis	Ill Communication	4:06
13.	"Twenty Questions"	Beastie Boys	Previously unreleased	2:28
14.	"Remote Control"	Beastie Boys	Hello Nasty	2:59
15.	"Railroad Blues"	Beastie Boys	"Country Mike's Greatest Hits"	2:38
16.	"Live Wire"	Beastie Boys	Previously unreleased	3:06
17.	"So What'cha Want"	Beastie Boys	Check Your Head	3:37
18.	"Netty's Girl"	Beastie Boys; M. Nishita	"Pass the Mic" single	3:00
19.	"Egg Raid on Mojo"	M. Diamond; A. Yauch; J. Berry; K. Schellenbach	Polly Wog Stew	1:27
20.	"Hey Ladies"	Beastie Boys; M. Dike; J. King; M. Simpson	Paul's Boutique	3:47
21.	"Intergalactic"	Beastie Boys; M. Caldato Jr.	Hello Nasty	3:30
22.	"Big Shot (Live)" (Japan bonus track)		"Alive" single	3:03

=== Omission of "Rock Hard" ===
The band wanted to include their first major-label single "Rock Hard", which had been out of print since 1985, on this compilation. However, the song was not included because it contained samples from the AC/DC song "Back in Black", which were used without permission. Their desire to include the song was thwarted when AC/DC refused to grant clearance for the sample to be used. Mike D spoke to AC/DC's Malcolm Young personally on the phone when their lawyers refused to clear the sample, to no avail.

== Charts ==
=== Weekly charts ===
Chart (1999)	Peak position
Australian Albums (ARIA)	14
Austrian Albums (Ö3 Austria)	42
Belgian Albums (Ultratop Flanders)	37
Canadian Albums (Billboard)	18
Dutch Albums (Album Top 100)	62
Finnish Albums (Suomen virallinen lista)	12
German Albums (Offizielle Top 100)	50
New Zealand Albums (RMNZ)	4
Norwegian Albums (VG-lista)	11
Scottish Albums (Official Charts)	35
Swedish Albums (Sverigetopplistan)	8
Swiss Albums (Schweizer Hitparade)	72
UK Albums (Official Charts)	36
US Billboard 200	19

=== Year-end charts ===
Chart (2000)	Position
US Billboard 200	108

== Certifications ==
Region	Certification	Certified units/sales
Australia (ARIA)	Gold	35,000^{^}
Canada (Music Canada)	2× Platinum	200,000^{^}
Japan (RIAJ)	Gold	100,000^{^}
United Kingdom (BPI)	Gold	100,000^{*}
United States (RIAA)	2× Platinum	2,000,000^{^}
^{*} Sales figures based on certification alone.^{^} Shipments figures based on certification alone.

== Publication ==
- The Beastie Boys (2004). Beastie Boys Anthology: The Sounds of Science. PowerHouse Books. ISBN 978-1-5768-7105-8.
