= Scientists of Sound (The Blow Up Factor Vol. 1) =

EP by Beastie Boys
- Released: 1999
- Recorded: 1999
- Genres: Hip-hop, alternative hip-hop, old school hip-hop
- Label: Grand Royal/Capitol Records
- Producer: Beastie Boys

Beastie Boys chronology
Hello Nasty (1998)	Scientists of Sound (The Blow Up Factor Vol. 1) (1999)	The Sounds of Science (1999)

Professional ratings
Review scores
Source	Rating
AllMusic	3/5 stars

Scientists of Sound (The Blow Up Factor Vol. 1) is a Beastie Boys EP released in 1999. The tracks are remixes and alternate versions of songs released on their previous album, Hello Nasty (1998). Mike D and Kenny "Tick" Salcido worked on this release's track listing as well as "Tick" naming the release "Scientists of Sound" after a lyric from "Hello Nasty".

== Track listing ==
=== Side one ===
1. "The Negotiation Limerick File" (Adam Horovitz Remix)
2. "Intergalactic" (Colleone/Webb Remix)
3. "Three MC's And One DJ" (Live Video Version)
4. "Body Movin'" (KutMasta Kurt Remix)

=== Side two ===
1. "Putting Shame in Your Game" (Prunes RMX 2)
2. "The Negotiation Limerick File" (Handsome Boy Modeling School Makeover)
3. "Body Movin'" (KutMasta Kurt Remix Instrumental)
4. "The Negotiation Limerick File" (A Cappella Wet)
