= Beastie Boys Video Anthology =

2000 DVD by Beastie Boys

Video by Beastie Boys
- Released: October 10, 2000
- Recorded: 1982–2000
- Labels: The Criterion Collection, under license from Capitol Records

Beastie Boys chronology
Sabotage (1997)	Beastie Boys Video Anthology (2000)	Awesome; I Fuckin' Shot That! (2006)

Professional ratings
Review scores
Source	Rating
Allmusic	link

Beastie Boys Video Anthology is a 2000 DVD compilation of video clips by the Beastie Boys.

The compilation was issued by The Criterion Collection as their 100th DVD title. This compilation is Criterion's first, and currently only, music video compilation.

Each music video featured on this set contains numerous video angles and audio mixes which the viewer can mix-and-match, as well as storyboards, single covers, production photographs, commentaries and credits.

== Track listing ==
=== Disc 1 ===
1. "Intergalactic"
2. "Shake Your Rump"
3. "Gratitude"
4. "Something's Got to Give"
5. "Sure Shot"
6. "Hey Ladies"
7. "Looking Down the Barrel of a Gun"
8. "Body Movin'"
9. "So What'cha Want"

=== Disc 2 ===
1. "Sabotage"
2. "Shadrach"
3. "Three MCs and One DJ"
4. "Ricky's Theme"
5. "Pass the Mic"
6. "Holy Snappers"
7. "Root Down"
8. "Netty's Girl"
9. "Alive"

== Certifications ==
Region	Certification	Certified units/sales
Canada (Music Canada)	2× Platinum	20,000^{^}
United States (RIAA)	Gold	50,000^{^}
^{^} Shipments figures based on certification alone.
