= Beastie Boys Anthology =

Beastie Boys Anthology may refer to:

- Beastie Boys Anthology: The Sounds of Science - audio anthology composed of greatest hits, B-sides, and previously unreleased tracks
- Beastie Boys Video Anthology - a 2000 DVD compilation of video clips
