= The Sounds of Science =

The Sounds of Science may refer to:

- Beastie Boys Anthology: The Sounds of Science, a Beastie Boys anthology
- "The Sounds of Science" (song), the 6th track on the album Paul's Boutique by the Beastie Boys
