= Get It Together (Beastie Boys song) =

Single by Beastie Boys

from the album Ill Communication
- Released: May 9, 1994
- Genre: Hip-hop
- Length: 4:05
- Label: Capitol
- Songwriters: Michael Diamond, Adam Horovitz, Adam Yauch, Kamaal Fareed
- Producers: Beastie Boys, Mario Caldato Jr.

Beastie Boys singles chronology
"Sabotage" (1994)	"Get It Together" (1994)	"Sure Shot" (1994)

"Get It Together" is a song by American hip-hop group the Beastie Boys, released as a single from their fourth studio album, Ill Communication. The album version of the song features rapper Q-Tip of A Tribe Called Quest.

"Get It Together" is a hip-hop song containing elements of funk, boom bap and soul-jazz. The song contains vocal samples from the song "Headless Heroes" by Eugene McDaniels, and heavily samples a loop from "Aquarius/Let the Sunshine In" by the Moog Machine, from the album Switched-On Rock. "Get It Together" also appears on the group's compilation albums The Sounds of Science and Beastie Boys Music.

== Track listing ==
- CD single
1. "Get It Together" (LP version) – 4:07
2. "Sabotage" (LP version) – 3:00
3. "Dope Little Song" – 1:48
- US 12" single
1. Side A - 01 – "Get It Together" (LP Version)
2. Side A - 02 – "Get It Together" (Buck-Wild Remix)
3. Side A - 03 – "Resolution Time"
4. Side A - 04 – "Get It Together" (Buck-Wild Instrument)
5. Side B - 01 – "Get It Together" (A.B.A. Remix)
6. Side B - 02 – "Sabotage" (LP Version)
7. Side B - 03 – "Dope Little Song"
8. Side B - 04 – "Get It Together" (A.B.A. Instrumental)
- UK CD single
1. "Get It Together"
2. "Sabotage"
3. "Get It Together" (Beastie Boys Remix)
4. "Resolution Time"

== Charts ==
Chart (1994)	Peak position
Australia (ARIA)	94
Netherlands (Dutch Top 40 Tipparade)	2
Netherlands (Single Top 100); With Sabotage	35
UK Singles (OCC)	19
UK Dance (OCC)	21
UK Dance (Music Week)	21
US Bubbling Under Hot 100 Singles (Billboard)	1
US Bubbling Under R&B/Hip-Hop Songs (Billboard)	13
US Hot Dance Music/Maxi-Singles Sales (Billboard)	5
US Hot Rap Tracks (Billboard)	43
