= (You Gotta) Fight for Your Right (To Party!) =

1986 song by the Beastie Boys

Single by Beastie Boys

from the album Licensed to Ill
- B-side: "Paul Revere"
- Released: December 1986
- Genre: Rap rock; hard rock
- Length: 3:29
- Label: Def Jam; Columbia
- Songwriters: Adam Yauch; Rick Rubin; Adam Horovitz
- Producer: Rick Rubin

Beastie Boys singles chronology
"The New Style" (1986)	"(You Gotta) Fight for Your Right (To Party!)" (1986)	"Brass Monkey" (1987)

Music video
- "(You Gotta) Fight for Your Right (To Party!)" on YouTube

"(You Gotta) Fight for Your Right (To Party!)" (shortened to "Fight for Your Right" on album releases) is a song by American hip-hop/rap rock group Beastie Boys, released as the fourth single from their debut album Licensed to Ill (1986). One of their best-known songs, it reached No. 7 on the Billboard Hot 100 in the week of March 7, 1987, becoming the group's highest-charting single and only top-10 hit. It was later named one of The Rock and Roll Hall of Fame's 500 Songs that Shaped Rock and Roll. The song was also included on their compilation albums The Sounds of Science in 1999, Solid Gold Hits in 2005, and Beastie Boys Music in 2020.

== History ==
The song, written by Adam Yauch and band friend Tom "Tommy Triphammer" Cushman (who appears in the video), was initially written for their side band called Brooklyn; however, Yauch proposed to use the song for the Beastie Boys. The song was meant as an insignificant portrayal of "party" and "attitude"-themed songs, such as "Smokin' in the Boys Room" and "I Wanna Rock", but unintentionally became representative of their artistic style. Although the group initially embraced the booze-fueled party identity, their style changed when their social habits became more marijuana-centric after touring. Though they continued playing their early hits, including "Fight for Your Right to Party", on future tours, this change had the welcome effect of alienating a significant population of their audience who preferred the previous style. Mike D commented that, "The only thing that upsets me is that we might have reinforced certain values of some people in our audience when our own values were actually totally different. There were tons of guys singing along to 'Fight for Your Right' who were oblivious to the fact it was a total goof on them." One writer noted that the Beasties had simply “taken the over-the-top, MTV Spring Break-party mentality and rude excesses of the 80s, and pushed it all over the edge.” Writing credits were given to Yauch, Ad-Rock and the Beastie Boys' producer, Rick Rubin.

== Music video ==
The music video for "Fight for Your Right" begins as a mother and father tell their two sons to stay out of trouble while they are away. When they leave, the two boys decide to have a party including soda and pie, hoping "no bad people show up"; this prompts the arrival of the Beastie Boys (Ad-Rock, Mike D, and MCA) at the party. The trio start all kinds of trouble within the house, such as chasing and kissing girls, starting fires, bringing more troublesome people into the house, infusing the punch with alcohol, smashing objects, and starting a pie fight. As the pie fight reaches its peak, the Beastie Boys run away, the party having become too out of hand. As the video ends, the remaining partygoers shout along to the final chorus of "party!" before hitting the returning mother in the face with a pie.

Directed by Ric Menello and Adam Dubin, there are numerous cameos in this video, including an unknown-at-the-time Tabitha Soren, Cey Adams, Ricky Powell, members of the punk rock band Murphy's Law, as well as the Beastie Boys' producer, Rick Rubin, who was shown wearing an AC/DC and Slayer shirt, the latter of whom were also signed to Def Jam at the time.

Soren, whose hair was dyed blonde for the shoot, got her chance to be in the video because she was a friend of Rubin's and attended nearby New York University. "I worked hard at not getting any pie goo on me," she recalls, because the whipped cream used had been scoured from supermarket trash cans since there was no money in the budget for it. As a result, it was rancid and had a foul odor. "The smell in that room, when everyone was done throwing pies, was like rotten eggs. You wanted to throw up."

== Fight for Your Right Revisited ==
In 2011, Yauch directed and wrote a surreal comedic short film entitled Fight for Your Right Revisited to commemorate the 25th anniversary of the original video's release. The short film serves as a video for the single "Make Some Noise" from Hot Sauce Committee Part Two. Most of the non-sequitur dialogue between characters were a result of improvisation by the cast.

Revisited acts as a sequel to the events that took place in the original music video and features Mike D, Ad-Rock and MCA (played by Seth Rogen, Elijah Wood, and Danny McBride, respectively) as they get into more drunken antics, before being challenged to a dance battle by the future Mike D, Ad-Rock and MCA (John C. Reilly, Will Ferrell, and Jack Black, respectively), coming out of a DeLorean. Eventually, both sets of Beasties get rousted by a trio of cops (played by the actual Beastie Boys) and taken to jail.

The short features numerous cameo appearances, some appearing onscreen for only a few seconds. They include Stanley Tucci and Susan Sarandon (as the parents seen in the original video), Adam Scott, Alicia Silverstone, Amy Poehler, Chloë Sevigny, David Cross, Jason Schwartzman, Kirsten Dunst, Laura Dern, Mary Steenburgen, Martin Starr, Maya Rudolph, Orlando Bloom, Rashida Jones, Rainn Wilson, Shannyn Sossamon, Steve Buscemi, Ted Danson, and Will Arnett.

Although "Fight for Your Right" is not performed, its outro can be heard at the beginning of the short.

== Accolades ==
Year	Publisher	Country	Accolade	Rank
1986	The Village Voice	United States	"Singles of the Year" (25)	12
1987	NME	United Kingdom	"Singles of the Year" (60)	14
1987	Record Mirror	United Kingdom	"Singles of the Year" (20)	20
1994	Dave Marsh & James Bernard	United States	"Greatest Eighties Protest Songs"	*
1995	Rock and Roll Hall of Fame	United States	"500 Songs That Shaped Rock and Roll"	*
1998	Triple J Hottest 100	Australia	"Hottest 100 of All Time"	38
1999	MTV	United States	"100 Greatest Music Videos Ever Made"	66
2001	Uncut	United Kingdom	"The 100 Greatest Singles of the Post-Punk Era"	50
2001	VH1	United States	"100 Greatest Videos"	100
2003	PopMatters	United States	"The 100 Best Songs Since Johnny Rotten Roared"	99
2003	Q	United Kingdom	"The 1001 Best Songs Ever"	121
2003	VH1	United States	"100 Greatest Songs of the Past 25 Years"	96
2004	Q	United Kingdom	"150 Greatest Rock Lists" (30 Best Hip Hop Songs)	20
2005	Q	United Kingdom	"Ultimate Music Collection" (Rap Tracks)	*
2006	Q	United Kingdom	"100 Greatest Songs of All Time"	51
2006	VH1	United States	"100 Greatest Songs of the 80's"	49
2007	Mojo	United Kingdom	"80 from the 80's"	*
2009	The Guardian	United Kingdom	"1000 Songs Everyone Must Hear" (Party Songs)	*
2010	XFM	United Kingdom	"Top 1000 Songs of All Time"	191
2014	NME	United Kingdom	"500 Greatest Songs of All Time"	166

(*) indicates the list is unordered.

== Charts ==
=== Weekly charts ===
Chart (1987)	Peak position
Australia (Kent Music Report)	37
Belgium (Ultratop 50 Flanders)	16
Canada Top Singles (RPM)	7
Ireland (IRMA)	16
Netherlands (Dutch Top 40)	10
Netherlands (Single Top 100)	10
New Zealand (Recorded Music NZ)	17
UK Singles (Official Charts)	11
US Billboard Hot 100	7
US Cash Box	3
West Germany (GfK)	25

Chart (2012)	Peak position
Belgium (Back Catalogue Singles Flanders)	35
Japan Hot 100 Singles	74

=== Year-end charts ===
Chart (1987)	Rank
Canada Top Singles (RPM)	71
Netherlands (Single Top 100)	66
US Billboard Hot 100	98
US Cash Box	49

== Certifications ==
Region	Certification	Certified units/sales
United Kingdom (BPI)	Gold	400,000^{‡}
^{‡} Sales+streaming figures based on certification alone.

== Cover versions ==
=== N.Y.C.C. version ===
"Fight for Your Right (To Party)"
- Standard artwork

Single by N.Y.C.C.

from the album Greatest Hits
- B-side: "Paaarty"; "Highway to Hell"; "We Are N.Y.C.C."
- Released: January 28, 1998
- Studio: Boogie Park (Hamburg, Germany)
- Genre: Hip house
- Length: 3:20
- Label: Control
- Songwriters: Beastie Boys; Rick Rubin
- Producer: Dee Jay Sören

In 1998, the song was covered by German hip-hop act N.Y.C.C. as "Fight for Your Right (To Party)". It reached the top 20 in nine countries across Europe and in Australia and New Zealand. In the United Kingdom, where it peaked at number 14, it was the first song by a German hip-hop group to reach the top 25.

==== Track listings ====
European CD single

1. "Fight for Your Right" (single version) – 3:20
2. "Fight for Your Right" (extended version) – 5:55
3. "Fight for Your Right" (Disco Selection Mix) – 5:52
4. "Fight for Your Right" (long instrumental version) – 4:21

UK and European 12-inch single

A1. "Fight for Your Right" (extended version)
A2. "Fight for Your Right" (long instrumental version)
B1. "Fight for Your Right" (Disco Selection Mix)
B2. "Paaarty" (Deep Star version)

Australian maxi-CD single

1. "Fight for Your Right (To Party)" (single version) – 3:20
2. "Fight for Your Right (To Party)" (extended version) – 5:55
3. "Paaarty" (Deep Star version) – 10:14

==== Credits and personnel ====
Credits are lifted from the European CD single liner notes.

Studio

- Recorded and mixed at Boogie Park Studio (Hamburg, Germany)

Personnel

- Rick Rubin, Beastie Boys – writing
- Dee Jay Sören – production, recording, mixing
- Lacarone – executive production
- CASK – "N.Y.C.C." tag

==== Charts ====
===== Weekly charts =====
Chart (1998)	Peak position
Australia (ARIA)	12
Austria (Ö3 Austria Top 40)	13
Belgium (Ultratop 50 Flanders)	16
Europe (Eurochart Hot 100)	22
Finland (Suomen virallinen lista)	14
Germany (GfK)	11
Ireland (IRMA)	11
New Zealand (Recorded Music NZ)	13
Norway (VG-lista)	2
Scottish Singles Sales (Official Charts)	2
Sweden (Sverigetopplistan)	3
Switzerland (Schweizer Hitparade)	19
UK Singles (Official Charts)	14
UK Dance (Official Charts)	23
UK Indie (Official Charts)	2

===== Year-end charts =====
Chart (1998)	Rank
Australia (ARIA)	51
Belgium (Ultratop 50 Flanders)	91
Germany (Media Control)	68
Sweden (Hitlistan)	31

==== Certifications ====
Region	Certification	Certified units/sales
Australia (ARIA)	Gold	35,000^{^}
Sweden (GLF)	Gold	15,000^{^}
^{^} Shipments figures based on certification alone.

=== Other notable covers and cultural usage ===
On August 2, 2009, Coldplay performed an acoustic piano-based version of this song during their concert on the final night of the All Points West concert series as a tribute to the Beastie Boys, who were unable to perform on opening night following Adam Yauch's announcement that he had cancer. The band performed this version again on May 4, 2012, at their concert at the Hollywood Bowl as a tribute to Yauch, who had died earlier that day.

Singer/songwriter Cara Quici sampled the song and added new lyrics for her 2013 song "Fight" personally approved by Rick Rubin and licensed by Sony ATV and Universal Music Group. The "Fight" video by Cara Quici features a cameo by Dennis Rodman.

After winning the 2019 AFC Championship Game, Kansas City Chiefs tight end Travis Kelce chanted "You gotta fight for your right to party!" in his postgame interview. After the Chiefs' victory in Super Bowl LIV, Kelce again used the chant from the song at the victory parade in Kansas City. The song's main chorus has since become a cultural reference among Chiefs fans, and in the 2020 season became the song played at Chiefs home games to celebrate after each touchdown scored by the team. Kelce continued the tradition through his second and third Super Bowl wins with the Chiefs, even performing the song with Jimmy Fallon and The Roots on The Tonight Show.

Mötley Crüe covered this song on their 2024 EP Cancelled.

Slipknot used a sample from the music video for the song in the intro for their song "Arsenal" released in 2026.
