= Spin Psycle =

Mixtape by Mix Master Mike
- Released: September 11, 2001
- Genres: Hip-hop, turntablism
- Length: 63:11
- Label: Moonshine Music

Mix Master Mike chronology
Anti-Theft Device (1998)	Spin Psycle (2001)	Bangzilla (2004)

Spin Psycle is a 2001 hip-hop mix album by Mix Master Mike. It was released on September 11, 2001.

== Track listing ==
No.	Title	Original artist	Length
1.	"Intro"		0:24
2.	"N.Y. Is Good"	BS 2000	2:39
3.	"Board Burner"	Mix Master Mike	3:28
4.	"Cosmic Assassins"	Mix Master Mike & DJ Q-Bert	3:49
5.	"Now You're Mine"	Gang Starr	2:52
6.	"Get Yourself Up"	KRS-One	3:51
7.	"Bumpy Knuckles Baby"	Freddie Foxxx	3:29
8.	"Ice Age"	Encore	3:53
9.	"U Know the Name"	K-Otix	2:34
10.	"The Good Life"	Cali Agents	2:47
11.	"Under Pressure"	El Da Sensei	3:07
12.	"Analyze"	Mass Influence	2:40
13.	"Introducing the Raw"	Rawcotiks	2:39
14.	"Solar Powered"	Binary Star	2:39
15.	"Grand Agent"	Patience	2:13
16.	"Back to Back"	Large Professor	3:30
17.	"Strong Island"	JVC Force	2:20
18.	"Goldmine"	Fatlip	3:34
19.	"One for the Treble"	Davy DMX	3:12
20.	"Me and Him"	Porn Theater Ushers	1:28
21.	"Positive Contact (Mario C remix)"	Deltron 3030	3:43
22.	"Three MC's and One DJ"	Beastie Boys	2:11

== Reception ==
Professional ratings
Review scores
Source	Rating
AllMusic	4.5/5 stars

AllMusic gave a positive review of the album and praised the artist lineup, stating "Anyone who can round up all those guys for some exclusive material and have it cut up by one of the world's best DJs is bound to create something beautiful, and that's exactly what this is."
