= Alive (Beastie Boys song) =

Single by Beastie Boys

from the album Beastie Boys Anthology: The Sounds of Science
- Released: October 19, 1999
- Recorded: 1999
- Genre: Hip-hop (Original): Rap rock; alternative hip-hop (At Yauch's House Remix)
- Length: 3:48
- Label: Capitol
- Songwriters: Michael Diamond, Adam Horovitz, Adam Yauch
- Producers: Beastie Boys, Mario Caldato, Jr.

Beastie Boys singles chronology
"Remote Control / Three MC's and One DJ" (1999)	"Alive" (1999)	"Ch-Check It Out" (2004)

Music video
- "Alive" on YouTube

"Alive" is a song by American hip-hop group the Beastie Boys, released as the first single from their compilation album Beastie Boys Anthology: The Sounds of Science.

"Big Shot" is a live cover originally by Billy Joel. "Start!" is a mainly instrumental cover originally by The Jam.

== Track listing ==
CD 1

1. "Alive" – 3:50
2. "You + Me Together" – 3:13
3. "Big Shot (Live)" – 3:04
4. "Alive" (Video)

CD 2

1. "Alive" – 3:50
2. "Alive (B.R.A. Remix)" – 3:36
3. "Start!" – 2:50
4. "Start!" (Video)

== Charts ==
Chart (1999)	Peak position
New Zealand Singles Chart	22
UK Singles Chart	28

== Release history ==
Region	Date	Formats(s)	Label(s)	Ref(s).
United States	October 19, 1999	Alternative radio	Grand Royal; Capitol	
