= Cara Quici =

Cara Elizabeth Quici (born May 30) is an American singer, songwriter, and actress born and raised in Corpus Christi, Texas now living in Los Angeles. Due to the difficulty many people had pronouncing her last name, she now performs professionally under the name CARA.

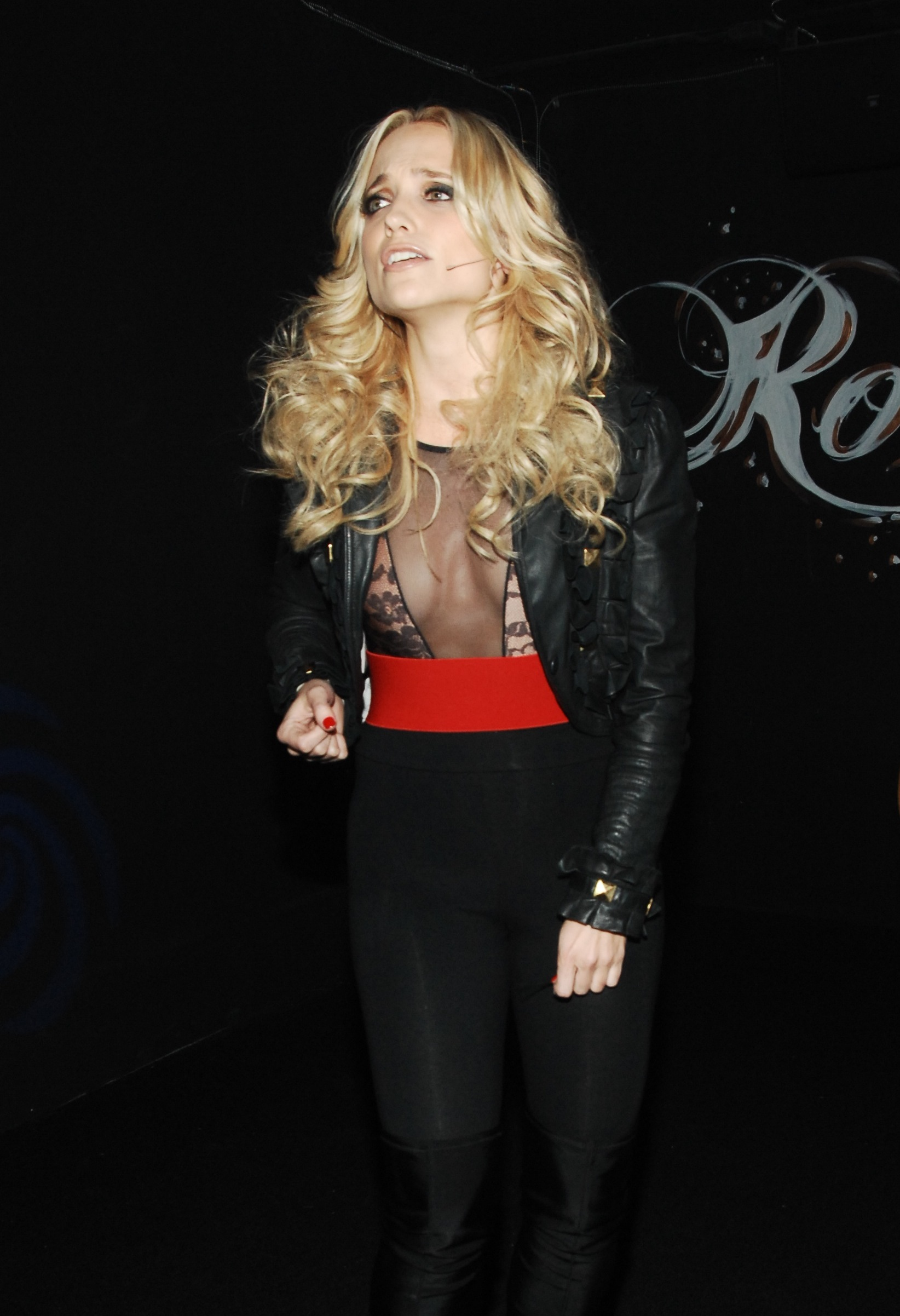
Cara Quici performing "FALL" in New York City to benefit the Humane Society at Rokk City, 2011

== Early life ==
Quici began singing church hymns at the age of 4. She also participated in school musicals and band where she was the first-chair flautist. Quici's family owned and operated a pro-sound, lighting, and DJ equipment business for over 30 years in Texas. Quici's father is a guitarist.

== Career ==
=== Career beginnings ===
As a teenager, Quici signed with Infinity Model and Talent Agency in Texas. She later competed at the International Modeling and Talent Association (IMTA) Convention in Hollywood, California, and at several Universal Cheerleaders Association competitions. On her 18th birthday, she moved to New York City, and later set up residence in Los Angeles, CA, splitting her time between the two cities.

=== 2009-Present ===
==== Music ====
Quici trained for her first professional recording sessions with Oksana Kolesnikova at the Oksana School of Music and Musician's Institute, and with Carol Rogers in Hollywood.

Quici has written over 30 songs with top producers and writers across the country. Her first single, "Away From You", was produced by Max Gousse and Billboard Hot 100 producer Fuego. "Away From You (Jump Smokers Remix)" reached the number 27 on the Dance Billboard charts.

Quici's unreleased songs "Adios", "OAI" and "Clone" were featured on four episodes of CMT's hit show Southern Nights. Her single "Fight", a remake of the Beastie Boys' classic "Fight For Your Right (To Party)", was released in 2013 and became available on iTunes in 2014. The music video, featuring Dennis Rodman, reached over a million views within two weeks of its release. In February/March 2014, Quici was the number-one most active independent artist in US TOP 40 radio rotation for four weeks straight.

==== Return to Music and The Kronicles (2014–present) ====
After releasing the single “FIGHT” in 2014, CARA stepped away from music and entered the cannabis industry. That same year, she became involved with a licensed medical marijuana collective in Southern California. In 2021, she founded her own cannabis business, which she has cited as influential to her personal development and creative direction during this period.

Later in 2021, CARA began writing new material while residing in Corpus Christi, Texas. She remained there following the death of her brother in June 2022 and her mother in August 2023. These events significantly influenced the thematic focus of her debut album, The Kronicles, which is largely autobiographical in nature.

Upon returning to music, she began performing and releasing material under the stage name CARA, which she trademarked, distinguishing her current work from her earlier releases under the name Cara Quici.

In May 2024, CARA began recording at Orb Recording Studios in Austin, Texas, where she has continued work on the project through June 2025. The Kronicles is a concept album currently in development, structured around key events in her life. Musically, the album incorporates pop and trap production alongside classical elements, including the use of flute, referencing CARA’s early musical training.

The Kronicles is scheduled for release in 2027.

The album’s lead single, “BLVD,” was released in late 2024 and reached No. 2 on the Mediabase Top 40 Pop Independent Artist chart, as well as No. 41 on the Mediabase Top 40 Pop chart overall. The accompanying music video, filmed in Los Angeles, received coverage from publications including SPIN, LA Weekly, and Rolling Stone UK.

In June 2025, CARA released the follow-up single “TEARS.” The single reached No. 6 on the Mediabase Top 40 Pop Independent Artist chart and No. 47 on the Mediabase Top 40 Pop chart. “TEARS” also reached No. 70 on the U.S. iTunes Pop Chart and debuted at No. 19 on the YouTube Daily Charts in Canada. The song trended on social media platforms in the United States and Canada, reaching No. 5 in the United States and No. 2 in Canada on Instagram’s trending audio charts, and No. 34 on TikTok’s Top 50 chart in Canada.

During the promotional cycle for “TEARS,” CARA appeared on the covers of Marie Claire Spain and Playboy South Africa. She was also featured in publications including Galore Magazine, The Blast, Jamo Magazine, Naluda Magazine, and Flaunt Magazine. In October 2025, CARA performed at a Los Angeles Fashion Week Spring/Summer 2026 event held at One Culver: The Atrium in Los Angeles. The appearance included a live musical performance and marked her runway debut featured on The Daily Front Row,ET & OK Magazine.

The next single from The Kronicles, titled “YEA WZUP,” is scheduled for release in the summer of 2026.

Quici releases her music through her own label, QMH Records. In early 2015, Quici began recording her debut EP.

==== Television appearances ====
Quici was interviewed on the Playboy Morning Show in 2013.

In 2012, Quici appeared on Season 5 of The Real Housewives of New York City as the entertainment. She was also featured performing live in 2012 on Bravo TV's "Watch What Happens Live" hosted by Andy Cohen season 7, episode 22. She appeared in 2009 on The Millionaire Matchmaker, where she declared herself a Scientologist.

She appeared on the Howard Stern show as a contestant for the "Dumb As a Rock" contest. She also portrayed a nurse on two episodes of Scrubs in 2009.

=== Press coverage ===
CARA has been featured in :

Maxim Magazine[9] 
Esquire Magazine[10]
FHM Magazine[11]
Marie Claire Spain[12]

== Discography ==
=== Singles ===
Title	Year
Away From You	2010
Away From You (Jump Smokers Remix)	2010
Away From You (Jump Smokers Extended Club Remix)	2010
Away From You (Manuel Tilca Remix)	2010
As We Live	2011
Without You	2011
Bad Girl	2011
Fall	2011
Bass	2012
Do It Now	2012
Fight	2014
Sweat	2022
Day in my Life	2022
Adios	2022
Away From You	2022
End of the Universe	2022
Clone	2022
Breakthrough	2022
As We Live	2022
Last Laugh	2022
Rock You on the Floor	2022
Away From You (Jump Smokers Remix)	2022
Without You	2022
Bad Girl	2022
Fall	2022
BLVD	2024
TEARS	2025

=== Albums ===
Title	Year
Day in My Life	2022
