= Remote Control / Three MC's and One DJ =

1999 single by Beastie Boys

"Remote Control" / "Three MCs and One DJ"

Single by Beastie Boys

from the album Hello Nasty
- Released: May 8, 1999
- Recorded: 1998
- Genre: Rap rock ("Remote Control"); Alternative hip-hop ("Three MCs and One DJ")
- Length: 2:58 ("Remote Control"); 2:50 ("Three MCs and One DJ")
- Label: Grand Royal, Capitol
- Songwriter: Beastie Boys
- Producers: Beastie Boys, Mario Caldato, Jr.

Beastie Boys singles chronology
"The Negotiation Limerick File" (1998)	"Remote Control" / "Three MCs and One DJ" (1999)	"Alive" (1999)

Music video
- "Three MC's and One DJ" on YouTube

"Remote Control" and "Three MCs and One DJ" are songs by American hip-hop group Beastie Boys, from their fifth studio album, Hello Nasty. The two were released as a double A-side single, serving as Hello Nasty's fourth single.

"Three MCs and One DJ" features scratching by Mix Master Mike, and marks his debut song with the group. The single peaked at #21 on the UK Singles Chart.

"Remote Control" was used in a commercial for ESPN's Winter X Games XV featuring two talking deer.

During the performance of "Three MCs and One DJ" in their 2006 concert film Awesome; I Fuckin' Shot That!, a young Donald Glover can be seen rapping along.

== Music video ==
The video for "Three MC's and One DJ" opens with Mike D, Ad-Rock and MCA posing in formation in the basement room of an apartment waiting for their DJ, Mix Master Mike. After a short while, he appears at the apartment's entrance door in a Ghostbuster costume. He rings the bell but the three do not move, so he has to wait for someone to exit the apartment to sneak in. Mike arrives at the room, gets behind the deck and the four start to perform. After the performance, the three go back to the same position as they were before the performance started and Mix Master Mike leaves.

The video was shot in the basement of 262 Mott Street in the Little Italy neighborhood of Manhattan, New York City. That was also where the Beastie Boys recorded Hello Nasty.

The Beastie Boys Video Anthology DVD features a version of the video with 6 switchable angles.

The alternate version of the song featured in the video is present on the Beastie Boys compilation album Beastie Boys Anthology: The Sounds of Science.

== Charts ==
Chart (1999)	Peak position
UK Singles Chart	21
