= Lee Majors Come Again =

Single by Beastie Boys

from the album Hot Sauce Committee Part Two
- B-side: "B-Boys in the Cut" (Acapella)
- Released: 2009
- Genre: Hardcore punk; punk rap; alternative rock; rap rock; noise rock
- Length: 3:43 (Album version); 3:38 (Single version)
- Label: Capitol
- Songwriters: Michael Diamond, Adam Horovitz, Adam Yauch
- Producer: Beastie Boys

Beastie Boys singles chronology
"The Electric Worm" (2007)	"Lee Majors Come Again" (2009)	"Too Many Rappers" (2009)

"Lee Majors Come Again" is a song by alternative hip hop group Beastie Boys, released as the first single from their eighth studio album Hot Sauce Committee Part Two (2011).

Promo singles of the track were given out in very select copies of the Check Your Head quadruple reissue boxset. The track made its first appearance in media on the game DJ Hero, where it was mixed with Daft Punk's "Da Funk", listed as the final mix in the game when sorted by intensity. The track also appears in the EA game Skate 3.

The title of the song refers to American actor Lee Majors.

== Track listing ==
7" single

No.	Title	Length
1.	"Lee Majors Come Again"	3:38
2.	"B-Boys in the Cut" (a capella)	2:33
