= Too Many Rappers =

2009 single by Nas and Beastie Boys

Single by Beastie Boys featuring Nas

from the album Hot Sauce Committee Part Two
- Released: July 21, 2009
- Recorded: 2008
- Genre: Hip hop; industrial rock
- Length: 4:51 (New Reactionaries/Album version); 4:24 (Single version)
- Label: Capitol
- Songwriters: Michael Diamond, Adam Horovitz, Adam Yauch, Nasir Jones
- Producer: Beastie Boys

Beastie Boys singles chronology
"Lee Majors Come Again" (2009)	"Too Many Rappers" (2009)	"Make Some Noise" (2011)

Nas singles chronology
"My President" (2008)	"Too Many Rappers" (2009)	"As We Enter" (2010)

Music video
- "Too Many Rappers" on YouTube

"Too Many Rappers" is a song by American hip hop group the Beastie Boys, released as the second single from their eighth studio album Hot Sauce Committee Part Two. It features fellow American rapper Nas. The song was nominated for Best Rap Performance by a Duo or Group at the 52nd Grammy Awards.

The song was released digitally to iTunes and Amazon, as well as on 12" vinyl, on July 21, 2009, about two years prior to the release of the album. The version featured on Hot Sauce Committee Part Two is an alternate version, known as the "New Reactionaries" version.

== Music video ==
The four-and-a-half-minute video for "Too Many Rappers" was directed by Roman Coppola but, for undisclosed reasons, never got an official premiere. The clip intercuts seemingly raw footage of Ad-Rock, Mike D, MCA and Nas rolling through various vignettes—Nashville's Centennial Park, a bridge, a store—with live and studio footage.

In January 2015, a contributor to the BeastieBoys.com message board discovered and posted the clip, which had been hosted on the website of film editor Neal Usatin. News of the discovery made headlines internationally; the Beastie Boys' official YouTube account would begin to host the videoclip a short time later.

== Track listing ==
=== 12" single ===
Side one
No.	Title	Length
1.	"Too Many Rappers"	4:21

Side two
No.	Title	Length
1.	"Too Many Rappers" (Instrumental)	4:21
2.	"Too Many Rappers" (A Capella)	4:20

== Charts ==
Chart (2009)	Peak position
Canadian Hot 100	70
U.S. Billboard Hot 100	93
