= Shadrach (Beastie Boys song) =

Single by Beastie Boys

from the album Paul's Boutique
- B-side: "And What You Give Is What You Get"
- Released: October 30, 1989
- Recorded: 1988
- Genre: Hip-hop; funk; sampledelia
- Length: 4:08
- Label: Capitol
- Songwriters: Michael Diamond; Matt Dike; Adam Horovitz; John King; Michael Simpson; Adam Yauch
- Producers: Beastie Boys; Mario Caldato Jr.; Dust Brothers

Beastie Boys singles chronology
"Hey Ladies" (1989)	"Shadrach" (1989)	"Pass the Mic" (1992)

Music video
- "Shadrach" on YouTube

"Shadrach" is a song by American hip-hop group Beastie Boys from their second studio album Paul's Boutique (1989). It was released as the album's second single on October 30, 1989, as a 7-inch vinyl backed with the non-album track "And What You Give Is What You Get". Both songs appear on the EP An Exciting Evening at Home with Shadrach, Meshach and Abednego (1989).

== Composition ==
The song refers to the Biblical story of Shadrach, Meshach, and Abednego and the fiery furnace in the Book of Daniel. However, the lyrics "Shadrach, Meshach, Abednego" in the track are used and sampled from Sly and the Family Stone's "Loose Booty", in which they are repeated and spoken rhythmically throughout the track in an almost rap-like form.

The drum beat is a loop from the song "Hot & Nasty" by Black Oak Arkansas and played by drummer Wayne "Squeezebox" Evans. In 2012, The Beastie Boys were sued for copyright infringement for sampling "Say What" in the song "Shadrach".

== Music video ==
The video released to promote the Beastie Boys' song was directed by Adam Yauch under his pseudonym Nathaniel Hörnblowér. Utilizing an abstract impressionist style, each frame of the video was hand-painted by animators working for Los Angeles–based animation studio Klasky Csupo. It was later included in the 22nd International Tournée of Animation. The video can be seen on the Beastie Boys Video Anthology DVD compilation released by The Criterion Collection.

They performed a live version of the song on Soul Train in 1990.

== Track listing ==
No.	Title	Length
1.	"Shadrach"	4:07
2.	"And What You Give Is What You Get"	3:42

== Personnel ==
- Produced & arranged by the Beastie Boys and the Dust Brothers.
- Engineered by Mario Caldato and Allen Abrahamson.
