= Hot Sauce Committee Part Two =

Studio album by Beastie Boys
- Released: May 3, 2011
- Recorded: 2008–2009
- Studio: Oscilloscope Laboratories (New York City)
- Genres: Hip-hop; electro
- Length: 44:07
- Label: Capitol
- Producer: Beastie Boys

Beastie Boys chronology
The Mix-Up (2007)	Hot Sauce Committee Part Two (2011)	Beastie Boys Music (2020)

Singles from Hot Sauce Committee Part Two
- 1. "Lee Majors Come Again" Released: 2009; 2. "Too Many Rappers" Released: July 21, 2009; 3. "Make Some Noise" Released: April 11, 2011; 4. "Don't Play No Game That I Can't Win" Released: July 26, 2011

Hot Sauce Committee Part Two is the eighth and final studio album by the American hip-hop group Beastie Boys, released on May 3, 2011, through Capitol Records. The project was originally planned to be released in two parts, with Hot Sauce Committee Pt. 1 originally planned for release in 2009. The release was delayed after band member Adam "MCA" Yauch's cancer diagnosis. After a two-year delay, only one collection of tracks, Part Two, was released, and the plan for a two-part album was eventually abandoned after Yauch's death on May 4, 2012.

The album was critically acclaimed upon release, with the energetic rapping, experimental production, and disregard for contemporary hip-hop trends being praised. It also performed well commercially, debuting at No. 2 on the Billboard 200 chart. The release was supported by four singles: "Lee Majors Come Again", "Too Many Rappers" featuring Nas, "Make Some Noise", and "Don't Play No Game That I Can't Win" featuring Santigold.

== Background ==
Cover of the unreleased Hot Sauce Committee Pt. 1.

The album was previously known by the working title Tadlock's Glasses, which was stated to refer to a former bus driver named Tadlock, who used to drive for Elvis Presley's back-up singers. Presley once gave Tadlock a pair of glasses which he was proud of. It was later speculated that the Tadlock's Glasses story was simply a joke misinterpreted by the media.

A large amount of material was recorded, and the plan was to release the album, now called Hot Sauce Committee, in two parts, as the Beastie Boys revealed to Drowned in Sound. Regarding the album's structure, Yauch stated: "It’s a combination of playing and sampling stuff as we’re playing, and also sampling pretty obscure records. There are a lot of songs on the record and there are a lot of short songs and they kind of all run into each other." A commentary track included with the Check Your Head re-release mentions that Bob Dylan would appear on the album.

=== Part 1 ===
The first part of the album was intended to be called Hot Sauce Committee Pt. 1, and was prepared for release, with artwork revealed and a planned release date of September 15, 2009. In an interview, the trio stated that the album was completed and that they would tour the United Kingdom to support the new record. This was delayed after Adam "MCA" Yauch was diagnosed with cancer. On July 20, 2009, Yauch announced the cancellation of tour dates, and assured fans that he should be fine after surgery. That October, he announced that the band had not yet decided on a new release date, but was quoted as saying he was hoping to release it in the first half of 2010.

Drowned in Sound published a review of Pt. 1 on June 28, 2009, the same day as an interview with the Beastie Boys about the album. The tracklist described in the review features most of the tracks that would later appear on Part Two, but in a different order, with the additional skit "Bundt Cake", which was described as "Another skit, this time a mere 21 seconds over a crisp drum break with snatches of cyber vocals". The tracklist given was as follows:

No.	Title	Length
1.	"Tadlock's Glasses"
2.	"B-Boys in the Cut"
3.	"Make Some Noise"
4.	"Nonstop Disco Powerpack"
5.	"OK"
6.	"Too Many Rappers" (featuring Nas)
7.	"Say It"
8.	"The Bill Harper Collection"
9.	"Don't Play No Game That I Can't Win" (featuring Santigold)
10.	"Long Burn The Fire"
11.	"Bundt Cake"
12.	"Funky Donkey"
13.	"Lee Majors Come Again"
14.	"Multilateral Nuclear Disarmament"
15.	"Pop Your Balloon"
16.	"Crazy Ass Shit"
17.	"Here's A Little Something For Ya"

=== Part 2 ===
The Beastie Boys sent out an email on October 17, 2010, to announce that Hot Sauce Committee Pt. 1 would be shelved indefinitely, and Hot Sauce Committee Pt. 2 would be released in 2011. An email sent the following week clarified that Pt. 2 would be released with almost exactly the same track list as was announced for Pt. 1, excluding the track "Bundt Cake." No date was set for Pt. 1. The project was finally released in May 2011 under the title Hot Sauce Committee Part Two, with a slightly altered track listing, and a new version of "Too Many Rappers".

According to Andrew Eastwick of Tiny Mix Tapes, "Long Burn the Fire" paid homage to the 1970s soul-rock band Black Merda, with its fuzz-inflected guitar riffs. The song's title, Eastwick continued, "may also be a sly nod" to music critic Robert Christgau, who recommended the band's 1972 record of the same name to the Beastie Boys in his review of their 1994 album Ill Communication.

== Leaks and promotion ==
On April 6, 2011, five days ahead of its scheduled release date, "Make Some Noise" was leaked online, and it was subsequently made available via the band's blog. It was released on time as a digital download and as a limited edition 7" vinyl single for Record Store Day five days later, with a Passion Pit remix of the track as a B-side. To promote the album, the Beastie Boys released clips of two songs: "Lee Majors Come Again" features hardcore punk, while "B-Boys in the Cut" is an a cappella piece. The tracks were previously released with a select few copies of the Check Your Head vinyl edition package.

The Beastie Boys sent out an email on April 22, 2011, with the cryptic message: "This Sat, 10:35 a.m. EST – Just listen, listen, listen to the beat box." The next day, the album was launched by live-streaming it online via boombox from inside Madison Square Garden. Two days later, the group streamed the explicit version of the album via SoundCloud to combat the leak of the clean promo version the previous weekend.

"Lee Majors Come Again" and "Here's a Little Something for Ya" are featured in remixed form on the Activision video game DJ Hero. "Lee Majors Come Again" also appears in Skate 3. A clean version of "Pop Your Balloon" was released on the soundtrack to NBA Live 10 in mid-2009. "Here's a Little Something for Ya" also features on the soundtrack for 2011 film Real Steel.

== Singles ==
"Lee Majors Come Again" was released as the album's first single in 2009. It was released as a 7" single, and some of these singles were distributed with select copies of a reissue box set of the group's third studio album ,Check Your Head.

A version of the song "Too Many Rappers" featuring Nas, was released as the album's second single in July 2009. It peaked at #93 on the Billboard Hot 100, becoming the Beastie Boys' first single in five years to chart on the Hot 100, after 2004's "Ch-Check It Out", which peaked at #68. "Too Many Rappers" was nominated for a Best Rap Performance by a Duo or Group at the 52nd Annual Grammy Awards. This nomination was for the version of the song intended for and promoted as part of the (never released) Hot Sauce Committee Pt. 1 album, rather than for the revised version of the song that was included on Hot Sauce Committee Part Two.

The next single, "Make Some Noise" was released as a download on April 11, 2011, and five days later as 7" vinyl single for Record Store Day. "Make Some Noise" reached #7 on Billboard's Alternative Songs chart, #15 on Billboard's Rock Songs chart, #18 on Japan's Hot 100, and #76 on the Canadian Hot 100.

On July 26, 2011, "Don't Play No Game That I Can't Win" featuring Santigold was released as the album's fourth single. It debuted at #80 on Billboard's R&B/Hip-Hop Songs chart, marking the group's first appearance on the chart in 24 years, after 1987's "Brass Monkey", which peaked at #83.

== Critical reception ==
Professional ratings
Aggregate scores
Source	Rating
AnyDecentMusic?	7.6/10
Metacritic	83/100
Review scores
Source	Rating
AllMusic	4.5/5 stars
The A.V. Club	A−
Entertainment Weekly	A−
The Guardian	4/5 stars
Los Angeles Times	4/4 stars
MSN Music (Expert Witness)	A−
NME	7/10
Pitchfork	7.0/10
Rolling Stone	4/5 stars
Spin	6/10

According to the review aggregator Metacritic, Hot Sauce Committee Part Two received "universal acclaim" based on a weighted average score of 83 out of 100 from 42 critic scores. Stephen Thomas Erlewine of AllMusic gave the album four and a half stars out of five, saying that "The Hot Sauce Committee, Pt. 2 does find the Beastie Boys at their best." Dave Simpson of The Guardian gave the album four out of five stars, writing: "Now in their fourth decade of working together, the Beasties' eighth studio album revisits their old-skool roots. However, their wit and invention transforms such tired cliches into their freshest offering in years."

Rob Sheffield of Rolling Stone gave the album four out of five stars, and said that, on it, "We get the sound of master musicians in their comfort zone, doing everything their own way. Nobody would want to hear the Beasties try anything else." Matt Diehl of the Los Angeles Times gave the album four out of four stars, writing: "This is vintage Beasties, all exuberant pass-the-mike battle rhymes and gritty break-beats so funky, it’s near impossible not to head-bob through the entire record." Mark Richardson of Pitchfork Media gave the album a 7.0 out of 10, concluding that, "Taken together, these 16 songs, which seem to touch on just about everything the Beastie Boys have said and done, may not add up to something amazing, but they do the job."

== Commercial performance ==
Hot Sauce Committee Part Two debuted at number two on the Billboard 200, behind Adele's 21, which was in its seventh non-consecutive week at the top. It sold 128,000 copies in its first week of release.

== Track listing ==
All tracks are written by Beastie Boys; additional lyrics on "Too Many Rappers" by Nasir Jones, and on "Don't Play No Game That I Can't Win" by Santi White. All tracks are mixed by Cassius band member Philippe Zdar.

No.	Title	Length
1.	"Make Some Noise"	3:30
2.	"Nonstop Disco Powerpack"	4:09
3.	"OK"	2:49
4.	"Too Many Rappers (New Reactionaries Version)" (featuring Nas)	4:51
5.	"Say It"	3:25
6.	"The Bill Harper Collection"	0:24
7.	"Don't Play No Game That I Can't Win" (featuring Santigold)	4:11
8.	"Long Burn the Fire"	3:33
9.	"Funky Donkey"	1:56
10.	"The Larry Routine"	0:30
11.	"Tadlock's Glasses"	2:19
12.	"Lee Majors Come Again"	3:43
13.	"Multilateral Nuclear Disarmament"	2:54
14.	"Here's a Little Something for Ya"	3:08
15.	"Crazy Ass Shit"	1:56
16.	"The Lisa Lisa/Full Force Routine"	0:49

iTunes deluxe bonus tracks / Vinyl edition bonus 7"
No.	Title	Length
17.	"Pop Your Balloon"	3:00
18.	"B-Boys in the Cut" (contains "The Larry Routine")	2:33

Note: The bonus 7" has tracks 17 and 18 reversed.

Vinyl digital download Redeem bonus track
No.	Title	Length
17.	"Make Some Noise" (The Bug remix)	3:47

Japan bonus track
No.	Title	Length
17.	"Make Some Noise" (Cornelius remix)	3:01

== Personnel ==
Personnel adapted from album liner notes.

- Ad-Rock – vocals, guitars
- MCA – vocals, bass guitar, upright bass
- Mike D – vocals, drums
- Money Mark – keyboards
- DJ Hurricane – turntables
- Mix Master Mike – turntables
- Beastie Boys – producers, engineers, art direction

== Charts ==
=== Weekly charts ===
Chart (2011)	Peak position
Australian Albums (ARIA)	7
Austrian Albums (Ö3 Austria)	20
Belgian Albums (Ultratop Flanders)	3
Belgian Albums (Ultratop Wallonia)	13
Canadian Albums (Billboard)	3
Danish Albums (Hitlisten)	8
Dutch Albums (Album Top 100)	6
Finnish Albums (Suomen virallinen lista)	29
French Albums (SNEP)	26
German Albums (Offizielle Top 100)	3
Irish Albums (IRMA)	12
Italian Albums (FIMI)	71
Norwegian Albums (VG-lista)	9
New Zealand Albums (RMNZ)	17
Scottish Albums (Official Charts)	10
Swiss Albums (Schweizer Hitparade)	3
UK Albums (Official Charts)	9
US Billboard 200	2
US Top R&B/Hip-Hop Albums (Billboard)	1
US Top Rap Albums (Billboard)	1
US Top Rock Albums (Billboard)	1

=== Year-end charts ===
Chart (2011)	Position
Belgian Albums (Ultratop Flanders)	71
Swiss Albums (Schweizer Hitparade)	91
US Billboard 200	92
US Top R&B/Hip-Hop Albums (Billboard)	25
US Top Rock Albums (Billboard)	11

== See also ==
- List of Billboard number-one R&B albums of 2011
- List of number-one rap albums of 2011 (U.S.)
