= The Negotiation Limerick File =

1998 single by Beastie Boys rapped in the form of a limerick

Single by Beastie Boys

from the album Hello Nasty
- Released: May 1999 (Aus)
- Genre: Alternative hip-hop
- Length: 2:46 (Album version); 3:16 (Single version)
- Label: Capitol
- Songwriters: Michael Diamond, Adam Horovitz, Adam Yauch, Mario Caldato Jr.
- Producers: Beastie Boys, Mario Caldato Jr.

Beastie Boys singles chronology
"Body Movin'" (1998)	"The Negotiation Limerick File" (1999)	"Remote Control / Three MC's and One DJ" (1999)

"The Negotiation Limerick File" is a song by American hip-hop group the Beastie Boys, released as a single from their fifth studio album Hello Nasty.

It peaked at #29 on the Billboard Modern Rock Tracks Chart.

The version on the CD single is 30 seconds longer (3:16) than the album version (2:46). It features extended instrumental sections with flanging effects. This song is unique because every verse is made up of five-line limericks.

== Track listing ==
1. "The Negotiation Limerick File" – 3:16
2. "Three MCs and One DJ" (Live Video version) – 2:46
3. "Putting Shame in Your Game" (Prunes Remix) – 4:17
4. "The Negotiation Limerick File" (Handsome Boy Modeling School Makeover) – 4:33
5. "The Negotiation Limerick File" (The 41 Small Star Remix) – 3:24

== Charts ==
Chart (1999)	Peak position
Australia (ARIA)	111
US Billboard Modern Rock Tracks	29
