= Make Some Noise (Beastie Boys song) =

Single by Beastie Boys

Single by Beastie Boys

from the album Hot Sauce Committee Part Two
- B-side: "Passion Pit Remix"
- Released: 11 April 2011
- Recorded: 2009
- Genre: Alternative hip-hop
- Length: 3:30
- Label: Capitol
- Songwriters: Michael Diamond, Adam Keefe Horovitz, Adam Nathaniel Yauch
- Producer: Beastie Boys

Beastie Boys singles chronology
"Too Many Rappers" (2009)	"Make Some Noise" (2011)	"Don't Play No Game That I Can't Win" (2011)

Music video
- "Make Some Noise" on YouTube

"Make Some Noise" is a song by American hip-hop group Beastie Boys, released as the third single from their eighth and final studio album, Hot Sauce Committee Part Two (2011). Following two other singles from the album, "Make Some Noise" was released on 11 April 2011, prior to the album's release. The song is also their highest-charting single since 2004's "Ch-Check It Out", peaking at No. 1 on the Nielsen BDS alternative rock indicator chart. The song appears on the soundtrack to the video game Madden NFL 12.

== Music videos ==
A standard length music video for "Make Some Noise" was released on 20 April 2011. The video is a sequel to the music video for the Beastie Boys' 1987 single "(You Gotta) Fight for Your Right (To Party!)". Seth Rogen, Danny McBride, and Elijah Wood portray MCA, Mike D, and Ad-Rock, respectively, as they continue the party throughout town. The music video features many notable film and television actors in cameo roles: Rashida Jones, Will Arnett, Rainn Wilson, Jason Schwartzman, Mary Steenburgen, Ted Danson, Amy Poehler, Steve Buscemi, Chloë Sevigny, Maya Rudolph, Kirsten Dunst, David Cross (portraying recurring Beastie Boys character Nathaniel Hornblower), Orlando Bloom, Will Ferrell, John C. Reilly, and Jack Black (the last three playing a future older version of the Boys).

A 30-minute-long version written and directed by MCA and entitled Fight for Your Right Revisited was released the following day to commemorate the 25th anniversary of "(You Gotta) Fight for Your Right (To Party!)". It is an extended version of the music video with additional segments, followed by a dance battle between the Beastie Boys and their future selves that ends with both past and future versions urinating on each other and everyone getting arrested by the police (played by the actual Beastie Boys). There are cameos from Susan Sarandon, Rashida Jones, Stanley Tucci, Amy Poehler, Mary Steenburgen, Alicia Silverstone, Laura Dern, Milo Ventimiglia and Martin Starr. Additional performers include Ted Danson, Adam Scott, Roman Coppola, Shannyn Sossamon, Jody Hill, Mike Mills, Arabella Field, Alfredo Ortiz, and Silvia Šuvadová. MCA's daughter Losel also makes a brief appearance in the videos.

== Charts ==
Chart (2011)	Peak position
Australia (ARIA)	128
Belgium (Ultratip Flanders)	24
Belgium (Ultratip Wallonia)	16
Canada (Canadian Hot 100)	76
Canada Rock (Billboard)	15
Germany (German Youth Airplay Chart)	40
Japan Hot Overseas (Billboard)	6
Netherlands (Mega Single Top 100)	87
US Bubbling Under Hot 100 (Billboard)	2
US Rock Songs (Billboard)	12
