= Don't Play No Game That I Can't Win =

Single by Beastie Boys and Santigold

Single by Beastie Boys featuring Santigold

from the album Hot Sauce Committee Part Two
- Released: July 26, 2011
- Recorded: 2008–09
- Genre: Alternative hip-hop; dub; neo-psychedelia; alternative rock; reggae fusion
- Length: 4:11
- Label: Capitol
- Songwriters: Michael Diamond; Adam Yauch; Adam Horovitz; Santi White
- Producer: Beastie Boys

Beastie Boys singles chronology
"Make Some Noise" (2011)	"Don't Play No Game That I Can't Win" (2011)

Santigold singles chronology
"Please Don't" (2010)	"Don't Play No Game That I Can't Win" (2011)	"Car Song" (2011)

Music video
- "Don't Play No Game That I Can't Win" (Full Length on YouTube "Don't Play No Game That I Can't Win" (Episodic) on YouTube

"Don't Play No Game That I Can't Win" is a song by American rap rock group Beastie Boys, from their eighth studio album Hot Sauce Committee Part Two. Featuring American singer Santigold, the song was released as the fourth and final single from the album on July 26, 2011. "Don't Play No Game That I Can't Win" was written and produced by group members Michael "Mike D" Diamond, Adam "MCA" Yauch and Adam "Ad-Rock" Horovitz, with additional writing by Santigold.

"Don't Play No Game That I Can't Win" was the last Beastie Boys single released before the death of Adam Yauch.

== Critical reception ==
"Don't Play No Game That I Can't Win" received generally positive reviews from critics, who praised Santigold's guest appearance and its reggae feel. Dave Simpson of The Guardian wrote: "Santigold gives 'Don't Play No Game That I Can't Win' some instantly infectious pop reggae sunshine." Kyle Anderson of Entertainment Weekly praised the song, calling it "a perfect reggae-kissed summer jam". Matt Diehl of the Los Angeles Times called Santigold's guest appearance memorable, and wrote that she added to the track "Brooklyn dancehall fire and a welcome feminine contrast to the b-boy stances." Mark Richardson of Pitchfork Media wrote that the pairing between the Beastie Boys and Santigold on the track "feels natural and obvious", adding that one "could argue that the Beastie Boys' polyglot approach in the 90s helped clear the way for her style, which mixes an ear for the sound of other cultures with a touch of Lower East Side artiness."

== Music video ==
The music video for "Don't Play No Game That I Can't Win" was directed by the group's longtime collaborator Spike Jonze. In the video, the Beastie Boys, along with Santigold, are portrayed in action figure form. The Beastie Boys play a concert that is attacked by enemy soldiers. After the Beastie Boys battle with the soldiers, Nazi zombies reanimate from the snow to attack the Beastie Boys. A yeti comes to their aid and kills the Nazi zombies. The yeti then helps the Beastie Boys escape in a helicopter. More enemy soldiers with jet packs shoot down the helicopter. The Beastie Boys parachute into shark-infested waters, where they are rescued by submarine. A boat full of enemy soldiers attack the submarine with depth charges. The Beastie Boys manage to sink the boat full of enemy soldiers, and then go water skiing.

== Formats and track listings ==
- Digital download
1. "Don't Play No Game That I Can't Win" (Edit) – 2:51
2. "Don't Play No Game That I Can't Win" (SebastiAn Remix) – 3:27
3. "Don't Play No Game That I Can't Win" (Bangladesh Remix) – 4:12
4. "Don't Play No Game That I Can't Win" (Major Lazer Beastie Remix Edition) – 4:04
5. "Don't Play No Game That I Can't Win" (K. Flay Remix) – 3:32
6. "Don't Play No Game That I Can't Win" (Z-Trip's Evil Twin Remix) – 4:13
7. "Don't Play No Game That I Can't Win" (Acapella – Make Your Own Remix) – 4:05

== Charts ==
Chart (2011)	Peak position
US Hot R&B/Hip-Hop Songs (Billboard)	80
