= Intergalactic (song) =

1998 single by Beastie Boys

Single by Beastie Boys

from the album Hello Nasty
- Released: June 22, 1998
- Genre: Hip-hop; electro
- Length: 3:51
- Label: Capitol; Grand Royal
- Songwriters: Michael Diamond; Adam Horovitz; Adam Yauch; Mario Caldato, Jr.
- Producer: Mario Caldato, Jr.

Beastie Boys singles chronology
"Root Down" (1995)	"Intergalactic" (1998)	"Body Movin'" (1998)

Music video
- "Intergalactic" on YouTube

"Intergalactic" is a song by the American hip-hop group Beastie Boys. It was released on June 22, 1998 as the lead single from their fifth studio album, Hello Nasty (1998). The single reached number 28 on the US Billboard Hot 100, making it the band's third and final top-40 single, and number five on the UK Singles Chart, where it remains the band's biggest hit. It received a Grammy Award for Best Rap Performance by a Duo or Group at the 1999 Grammy Awards.

== Music video ==
The "Intergalactic" video was directed by Adam Yauch under the pseudonym Nathanial Hörnblowér. The storyline revolves around a giant robot ("Sweepy" from Rock Steady Crew) causing destruction by fighting a giant octopus-headed creature (Joey Garfield) in a city while popping, a parody of, or tribute to,^{¿Por qué no los dos?} Japanese Kaiju films (specifically the series finale of Johnny Sokko and his Flying Robot). Various scenes are filmed in the Shibuya and Shinjuku train stations in Tokyo, Japan; the Tokyo Metropolitan Government Building No. 1 makes a brief appearance. Throughout the video, the band wear bright uniforms of (Koji) Japanese street construction workers. The opening excerpt from Mussorgsky's Night on Bald Mountain is played during the beginning of the video. The music video was added to MTV on the week ending June 14, 1998. The video was a regular on Total Request Live and won the award for Best Hip-Hop Video at the 1999 MTV Video Music Awards. Beastie Boys performed "Three MC's and One DJ" and "Intergalactic" at the 1998 MTV Video Music Awards.

The music video also somewhat parodies Japanese Super Sentai shows, which are the basis for Power Rangers and ranked number 64 on MuchMusic's 100 Best Videos. Complex wrote that, "We get the feeling Godzilla creator Tomoyuki Tanaka, who passed the year before the 'Intergalactic' single was released, would be proud."

== Track listings ==
CD single 1

No.	Title	Length
1.	"Intergalactic" (album version)	3:33
2.	"Hail Sagan (Special K)"	4:06
3.	"Intergalactic" (Prisoners of Technology Mix)	5:46
4.	"Intergalactic" (Fuzzy Logic Re-Mix)	3:47

CD single 2

No.	Title	Length
1.	"Intergalactic" (album version)	3:32
2.	"Intergalactic" (Remix No. 1)	3:54
3.	"Intergalactic" (Remix No. 2)	4:02
4.	"Intergalactic" (Remix No. 1 Instrumental)	3:56
5.	"Intergalactic" (Remix No. 2 Instrumental)	3:59

Vinyl single

Side A
No.	Title	Length
1.	"Intergalactic" (Album Version)
2.	"Intergalactic" (Instrumental)
3.	"Intergalactic" (Strawberry Bath And Jelly Souls Version)

Side B
No.	Title	Length
1.	"Intergalactic" (Prisoners Of Technology/TMS 1 Re-mix)
2.	"Intergalactic" (Fuzzy Logic Re-mix)
3.	"Intergalactic" (Acapella Version)

== Charts ==
=== Weekly charts ===
Chart (1998)	Peak position
Australia (ARIA)	21
Austria (Ö3 Austria Top 40)	26
Belgium (Ultratop 50 Flanders)	36
Canada Top Singles (RPM)	21
Canada Dance/Urban (RPM)	3
Europe (Eurochart Hot 100)	13
Germany (GfK)	40
Iceland (Íslenski Listinn Topp 40)	2
Ireland (IRMA)	24
Netherlands (Dutch Top 40)	15
Netherlands (Single Top 100)	16
New Zealand (Recorded Music NZ)	4
Norway (VG-lista)	6
Scottish Singles Sales (Official Charts)	3
Sweden (Sverigetopplistan)	9
Switzerland (Schweizer Hitparade)	33
UK Singles (Official Charts)	5
UK Dance (Official Charts)	1
UK Hip Hop/R&B (Official Charts)	1
US Billboard Hot 100	28
US Alternative Airplay (Billboard)	4
US Dance Singles Sales (Billboard)	6
US Pop Airplay (Billboard)	32
US Rhythmic Airplay (Billboard)	37

=== Year-end charts ===
Chart (1998)	Position
Canada Dance (RPM)	13
Iceland (Íslenski Listinn Topp 40)	10
Netherlands (Dutch Top 40)	104
New Zealand (RIANZ)	21
Sweden (Hitlistan)	38
US Maxi-Singles Sales (Billboard)	22
US Modern Rock Tracks (Billboard)	14

== Certifications ==
Region	Certification	Certified units/sales
Norway (IFPI Norway)	Gold	
Sweden (GLF)	Platinum	30,000^{^}
United Kingdom (BPI)	Gold	400,000^{‡}
^{^} Shipments figures based on certification alone.^{‡} Sales+streaming figures based on certification alone.

== Release history ==
Region	Date	Format(s)	Label(s)	Ref.
United States	June 2, 1998	Modern rock radio	Capitol; Grand Royal	
United Kingdom	June 22, 1998	12-inch vinyl; CD; cassette	Capitol; Grand Royal	
Japan	July 8, 1998	CD	Capitol; Grand Royal	
United States	July 14, 1998	12-inch vinyl	Capitol; Grand Royal	
United States	July 28, 1998	Contemporary hit radio	Capitol; Grand Royal	

== Other versions ==
The Japanese girl group Atarashii Gakko! produced a Japanese-language version of "Intergalactic" with a music video shot in Shinjuku, emulating the original music video.
