= Hello Nasty =

Studio album by Beastie Boys
- Released: July 6, 1998
- Recorded: 1997–1998
- Studios: G-Son (Los Angeles); Oscilloscope Laboratories (New York City)
- Genre: Hip-hop
- Length: 67:28
- Labels: Grand Royal; Capitol
- Producers: Beastie Boys; Mario Caldato Jr.

Beastie Boys chronology
The In Sound from Way Out! (1996)	Hello Nasty (1998)	Scientists of Sound (The Blow Up Factor Vol. 1) (1999)

Singles from Hello Nasty
- 1. "Intergalactic" Released: June 22, 1998; 2. "Body Movin'" Released: October 26, 1998; 3. "Remote Control / Three MC's and One DJ" Released: May 8, 1999; 4. "The Negotiation Limerick File" Released: May 1999 (Aus)

Hello Nasty is the fifth studio album by the American hip-hop group Beastie Boys, released on July 6, 1998 in Europe and on July 14 in the United States, by Grand Royal and Capitol Records. The album sold 681,000 copies in its first week, debuting at No. 1 on the Billboard 200 chart, and won Best Alternative Music Album and Best Rap Performance by a Duo or Group (for "Intergalactic") at the 41st Annual Grammy Awards. In Beastie Boys Book (2018), Ad-Rock said he felt Hello Nasty was the group's "best record".

== Background ==
The album was released in July 1998, just over four years after the previous Beastie Boys album, Ill Communication. It marked the addition of DMC champion Mix Master Mike to the group's line-up, and was the last time the band worked with percussionist Eric Bobo or a co-producer. There are several guest vocalists on the album, including Miho Hatori of Cibo Matto on "I Don't Know", and Jamaican dub musician Lee "Scratch" Perry on "Dr. Lee, PhD".

On the many musical styles on the album, Mike D said in 1998: "We spent so much time in the studio that we weren't in touch with the things that happened around us, not what's going on in the music scene and not what other people think about our music. We didn't even hear other opinions; we were rather reclusive. You know, there is nothing planned on the album, we didn't plan anything. All you hear are different sounds, sounds we experimented with, nothing else. Maybe that's our problem: we were so far removed from everything, it was like being underground, really underground, like in a hole in the ground."

The title of the album was allegedly inspired by the receptionist of the band's NY-based publicity firm Nasty Little Man, who would answer the phone with the greeting "Hello, Nasty."

There were CD, double-vinyl LP, MiniDisc, and cassette tape releases of the album. One of the cassette formats was packaged for a limited run by BioBox in a small cardboard box, rather than a clear plastic case, in an attempt to distinguish the retail product and augment sales.

== Music ==
Evan Rytlewski of Pitchfork assessed: "At its core, the album is a revisionist love letter to ’80s hip-hop, built from repurposed trappings of that era—808s, disco breaks, beatboxing, analogue synthesizers, Kool Moe Dee and Kurtis Blow samples, and scratches. But its true character lies in its tangents and outliers—the leisurely electronic pastiches, tipsy dub tracks, and earnest ballads that break up all the instant-gratification rap songs."

== Critical reception ==
Professional ratings
Review scores
Source	Rating
AllMusic	4.5/5 stars
Chicago Sun-Times	4/4 stars
Entertainment Weekly	B+
The Guardian	4/5 stars
Los Angeles Times	3/4 stars
NME	9/10
Pitchfork	8.5/10
Rolling Stone	4/5 stars
Spin	7/10
The Village Voice	A

Hello Nasty received acclaim upon its release. Caroline Sullivan, writing for The Guardian, named it the "Pop CD of the Week" and said it "fills a gap created by the current profusion of serious rock bands like Radiohead; elbowing its way up front, [and letting] rip with adolescent vigour." She went on to summarize the record as "the perfect party soundtrack by the perfect party band." Select's John Harris praised the Beastie Boys' lyrics for being as "fantastically off-beam as ever", while at the same time noting that they had "broadened their musical vistas yet further". Although AllMusic's Stephen Thomas Erlewine felt the album's ending was "a little anticlimactic", he also saw Hello Nasty as a progressive step forward from the group's 1992 LP Check Your Head and praised the contributions of the group's new recruit, Mix Master Mike: "Hiring DJ Mixmaster Mike turned out to be a masterstroke; he and the Beasties created a sound that strongly recalls the spare electronic funk of the early '80s, but spiked with the samples and post-modern absurdist wit that have become their trademarks." In his review for Entertainment Weekly, David Browne highlighted the album's multi-genre sound as its most engaging aspect:

Hello Nasty is a sonic smorgasbord in which the Beasties gorge themselves with reckless abandon. They dabble in lounge-pop kitsch (the loser put-down "Song for the Man"), make like a summit of Santana and Traffic (the Latin-flavored "Song for Junior"), and subtly incorporate a drum-and-bass shuffle into the mix ("Flowin' Prose"). The melange makes for a looser, more free-spirited record than their earlier albums; the music invites you in, rather than threatening to shut you out.

=== Accolades ===
* denotes an unranked list

Accolades for Hello Nasty
Publication	Country	Accolade	Year	Rank
Les Inrockuptibles	France	Best 50 Albums of the Year	1998	44
Melody Maker	United Kingdom	Best 50 Albums of the Year	1998	2
Mixmag	United Kingdom	Best 10 Albums of the Year	1998	5
Musikexpress	Germany	Best 50 Albums of the Year	1998	22
Muzik	United Kingdom	Best 75 Albums of the Year	1998	2
NME	United Kingdom	Best 50 Albums of the Year	1998	2
Pitchfork	United States	Best 50 Albums of the Year	1998	20
Q	United Kingdom	Best Albums of the Year	1998	*
Rocksound	France	Best 50 Albums of the Year	1998	17
Rolling Stone	United States	Best 5 Albums of the Year; The Essential Recordings of the 90s	1998; 2009	2 *
Select	United Kingdom	Best 30 Albums of the Year	1998	13
SPIN	United States	Best 20 Albums of the Year	1998	10
Technikart	France	Best 10 Albums of the Year	1998	2
The Face	United Kingdom	Best 20 Albums of the Year	1998	11
The Village Voice	United States	Albums of the Year Poll	1998	9
Uncut	United Kingdom	Best 40 Albums of the Year	1998	12

== Track listing ==
All tracks are written by Beastie Boys, except where noted.

Hello Nasty
No.	Title	Writer(s)	Length
1.	"Super Disco Breakin'"		2:07
2.	"The Move"		3:35
3.	"Remote Control"		2:58
4.	"Song for the Man" (with Brooke Williams)		3:13
5.	"Just a Test"		2:12
6.	"Body Movin'"	Beastie Boys; Mario Caldato Jr.	3:03
7.	"Intergalactic"	Beastie Boys; Caldato	3:51
8.	"Sneakin' Out the Hospital"		2:45
9.	"Putting Shame in Your Game"		3:37
10.	"Flowin' Prose"		2:39
11.	"And Me"		2:52
12.	"Three MC's and One DJ"	Beastie Boys; "Mix Master" Mike Schwartz; Wendell "DJ Hurricane" Fite	2:50
13.	"The Grasshopper Unit (Keep Movin')" (with Biz Markie)		3:01
14.	"Song for Junior" (with Jill Cunniff)	Beastie Boys; "Money" Mark Nishita; Eric Bobo; Jill Cunniff	3:49
15.	"I Don't Know" (with Miho Hatori)		3:00
16.	"The Negotiation Limerick File"	Beastie Boys; Caldato	2:46
17.	"Electrify"	Beastie Boys; Caldato	2:22
18.	"Picture This" (with Brooke Williams)	Beastie Boys; Brooke Williams	2:25
19.	"Unite"		3:31
20.	"Dedication"	Beastie Boys; Nishita	2:32
21.	"Dr. Lee, PhD" (with Lee "Scratch" Perry)	Beastie Boys; Nishita; Lee "Scratch" Perry	4:50
22.	"Instant Death"		3:22
Total length:			67:28

Japanese Edition bonus track
No.	Title	Length
23.	"Slow and Low" (Mix Master Mike Version)	3:00

Tour Edition bonus disc
No.	Title	Length
1.	"Hail Sagan (Special K)"	4:06
2.	"Body Movin'" (Fatboy Slim Remix)	5:34
3.	"Intergalactic" (Prisoners of Technology Remix)	5:46
4.	"Peanut Butter & Jelly"	2:16

2009 Remastered Edition Bonus Disc
No.	Title	Length
1.	"Description of a Strange Man"	1:21
2.	"Dirty Dog"	0:47
3.	"Intergalactic" (Colleone & Webb Remix)	3:54
4.	"Dr. Lee, PhD" (Dub Mix)	4:39
5.	"Switched On"	1:35
6.	"Body Movin'" (Fatboy Slim Remix)	5:33
7.	"Auntie Jackie Poom Poom Delicious"	1:39
8.	"Putting Shame in Your Game" (Prunes Remix)	4:26
9.	"Stink Bug"	2:02
10.	"Peanut Butter & Jelly"	2:14
11.	"Piano Jam"	1:51
12.	"Happy to Be in That Perfect Headspace"	0:50
13.	"The Negotiation Limerick File" (The 41 Small Star Remix)	3:20
14.	"The Drone"	2:44
15.	"20 Questions Version"	2:26
16.	"The Biz Grasshopper Experiment"	1:13
17.	"Hail Sagan (Special K)"	4:04
18.	"Body Movin'" (KutMasta Kurt Remix)	3:16
19.	"Creepin'"	2:32
20.	"Learning Remote Control"	1:50
21.	"Oh My Goodness This Record's Incredible"	0:04

== Personnel ==
Adapted from the AllMusic credits.

- Beastie Boys – producers
- Mario Caldato Jr. – producer
- Mix Master Mike – DJ (8, 9, 12, 13, 19)
- "Money" Mark Nishita – keyboards (4, 14, 20, 21)
- Eric Bobo – percussion (3, 8, 14, 21)
- Brooke Williams – vocals (4, 18)
- Nelson Keane Carse – trombone (4)
- Paul Vercesi – alto sax (4)
- Biz Markie – vocals (7, 12, 13)
- Jill Cunniff – vocals (14)
- Joe Locke – vibraphone (14)
- Steve Slagle – flute (14)
- Miho Hatori – vocals (15)
- Duduka Da Fonseca – percussion (15)
- Richard Siegler – percussion (15)
- Jane Scarpantoni – cello (15)
- Brian Wright – violin, viola (15)
- Lee "Scratch" Perry – vocals (21)
- Pat Shannahan – sample clearance
- Steve Revitte – engineering
- Suzanne Dyer – engineering
- Andy VanDette – mastering
- Howie Weinberg – mastering
- Michael Lavine – photography
- Cey Adams – art direction
- Bill McMullen – design

== Charts ==
=== Weekly charts ===
Weekly chart performance for Hello Nasty
Chart (1998)	Peak position
Australian Albums (ARIA)	1
Austrian Albums (Ö3 Austria)	2
Belgian Albums (Ultratop Flanders)	2
Belgian Albums (Ultratop Wallonia)	11
Canadian Albums (Billboard)	2
Danish Albums (IFPI Denmark)	6
Dutch Albums (Album Top 100)	2
European Albums (Billboard)	1
Finnish Albums (Suomen virallinen lista)	3
French Albums (SNEP)	5
German Albums (Offizielle Top 100)	1
Hungarian Albums (MAHASZ)	5
New Zealand Albums (RMNZ)	1
Norwegian Albums (VG-lista)	2
Scottish Albums (Official Charts)	2
Swedish Albums (Sverigetopplistan)	2
Swiss Albums (Schweizer Hitparade)	1
UK Albums (Official Charts)	1
UK R&B Albums (Official Charts)	4
US Billboard 200	1

=== Year-end charts ===
1998 annual chart performance for Hello Nasty
Chart (1998)	Position
Australian Albums (ARIA)	70
Austrian Albums (Ö3 Austria)	29
Belgian Albums (Ultratop Flanders)	55
Dutch Albums (Album Top 100)	84
German Albums (Offizielle Top 100)	33
New Zealand Albums (RMNZ)	25
Swedish Albums (Sverigetopplistan)	72
UK Albums (OCC)	58
US Billboard 200	13

1999 annual chart performance for Hello Nasty
Chart (1999)	Position
US Billboard 200	104

== Certifications ==
Certifications and sales figures for Hello Nasty
Region	Certification	Certified units/sales
Australia (ARIA)	Platinum	70,000^{^}
Belgium (BRMA)	Gold	25,000^{*}
Canada (Music Canada)	3× Platinum	300,000^{^}
Japan (RIAJ)	Platinum	200,000^{^}
Netherlands (NVPI)	Gold	50,000^{^}
New Zealand (RMNZ)	Platinum	15,000^{^}
Norway (IFPI Norway)	Gold	25,000^{*}
Sweden (GLF)	Gold	40,000^{^}
Switzerland (IFPI Switzerland)	Gold	25,000^{^}
United Kingdom (BPI)	Platinum	300,000^{‡}
United States (RIAA)	3× Platinum	3,000,000^{^}
^{*} Sales figures based on certification alone.^{^} Shipments figures based on certification alone.^{‡} Sales+streaming figures based on certification alone.
