= Body Movin' =

1998 single by Beastie Boys

Single by Beastie Boys

from the album Hello Nasty
- B-side: "Peanut Butter and Jelly"
- Released: October 26, 1998
- Recorded: 1997
- Genre: Alternative hip-hop; big beat
- Length: 3:09
- Label: Grand Royal; Capitol Records
- Songwriters: Michael Diamond; Adam Horovitz; Adam Yauch; Mario Caldato, Jr.; Tito Puente
- Producers: Beastie Boys; Mario Caldato, Jr.

Beastie Boys singles chronology
"Intergalactic" (1998)	"Body Movin'" (1998)	"The Negotiation Limerick File" (1998)

Music video
- "Body Movin'" on YouTube

"Body Movin'" is a song by American hip-hop group Beastie Boys, released as the second single from their fifth studio album Hello Nasty.

== Remixes ==
The Fatboy Slim remix has the same lyrics, but has differences in the instrumental. This remix features a sample of "Fido" by The Byrds. This song is also featured on the Beastie Boys compilation The Sounds of Science which was released in the United States.

There is also a radio remix featuring Redman, Biz Markie and Erick Sermon—utilizing the backing of the Fatboy Slim remix. This remix is also featured on the Xbox 360 game, Dance Central and the Wii dancing video game, Just Dance 2.

== Music video ==
The music video uses the Fatboy Slim remix version and was directed by MCA, under his alias Nathanial Hörnblowér. It parodies and incorporates scenes from the 1968 Italian action film Danger: Diabolik (based on the comic character Diabolik) with Ad-Rock playing the titular character, MCA playing the villain and Mike D as the villain's assistant. It was released in two versions: censored and uncensored, with the censored version replacing machine gun fire with that of a laser gun, and omitting a comedic but bloody decapitation.

== Track listing ==
CD single

1. "Body Movin'" – 3:09
2. "Body Movin'" (Fatboy Slim Remix) – 5:33
3. "Peanut Butter and Jelly" – 2:16

CD single v.2

1. "Body Movin'" – 3:05
2. "Body Movin'" (Moving in Kent Mix) – 5:58
3. "Dr. Lee PhD" (Dub Mix) – 4:31

== Chart positions ==
Chart performance for "Body Movin'"
Chart (1998–1999)	Peak position
Australia (ARIA)	28
Netherlands (Single Top 100)	82
Netherlands (Tipparade)	18
New Zealand (Recorded Music NZ)	20
Sweden (Sverigetopplistan)	30
UK Singles (OCC)	15
US Billboard Hot Dance Club Play	44
US Billboard Hot Dance Music/Maxi-Singles Sales	25
US Billboard Modern Rock Tracks	15
