= Hey Ladies =

Single by Beastie Boys

from the album Paul's Boutique
- B-side: "Shake Your Rump"
- Released: July 25, 1989
- Genre: Hip-hop; punk-funk
- Length: 3:47 (single); 14:28 (EP)
- Label: Capitol
- Songwriters: Beastie Boys, Barbarella Bishop, Matt Dike, Ronald Ford, John King, Gaary Shider, Linda Shider, Michael Simpson, Larry Troutman, Roger Troutman
- Producers: Beastie Boys, Dust Brothers

Beastie Boys singles chronology
"Girls" (1987)	"Hey Ladies" (1989)	"Shadrach" (1989)

Music video
- "Hey Ladies" on YouTube

"Hey Ladies" is a song by American hip-hop group Beastie Boys, featured on their album Paul's Boutique. It was the album's only charting single, hitting No. 36 on the Billboard Hot 100. It is also the first single in history to chart in the Top 20 of both the Billboard Hot Rap Singles and Modern Rock Tracks charts, hitting No. 10 on the former and No. 18 on the latter.

Cash Box said, "This is extremely funky, and way catchy."

The 12" record and CD versions of the single were released as an EP entitled Love American Style.

In the vein of Saturday Night Fever and the Dolemite series of blaxploitation films, a music video was made for the song.

The music video was directed by Adam Bernstein.

== Track listings ==
7" single

1. "Hey Ladies" – 3:54
2. "Shake Your Rump" – 3:18

Love American Style EP

1. "Hey Ladies" – 3:47
2. "Shake Your Rump" – 3:19
3. "33% God" – 3:40
4. "Dis Yourself in '89 (Just Do It)" – 3:26

== Charts ==
Chart (1989)	Peak position
Australian Singles Chart	141
Dutch Top 40 Tipparade Chart	2
Dutch Singles Chart	31
German Singles Chart	43
New Zealand Singles Chart	37
UK Singles (OCC)	76
U.S. Billboard Hot 100	36
U.S. Billboard Dance Singles Sales	16
U.S. Billboard Hot Dance Club Play	15
U.S. Billboard Hot Rap Tracks	10
U.S. Billboard Modern Rock Tracks	18
