= Paul's Boutique =

1989 studio album by the Beastie Boys

Studio album by Beastie Boys
- Released: July 25, 1989
- Recorded: 1988–1989
- Studios: Mario C's and the Record Plant, Los Angeles; The Opium Den, Koreatown, Los Angeles
- Genres: Hip-hop; sampledelia
- Length: 53:03
- Label: Capitol
- Producers: Beastie Boys; The Dust Brothers; Mario Caldato Jr.

Beastie Boys chronology
Licensed to Ill (1986)	Paul's Boutique (1989)	An Exciting Evening at Home with Shadrach, Meshach and Abednego (1989)

Singles from Paul's Boutique
- 1. "Hey Ladies" Released: July 25, 1989; 2. "Shadrach" Released: October 30, 1989

Paul's Boutique is the second album by the American hip-hop group the Beastie Boys, released on July 25, 1989, by Capitol Records. Produced by the Beastie Boys and the Dust Brothers, it makes extensive use of samples drawn from genres including funk, soul, rock and jazz. It was recorded over two years in Los Angeles at Matt Dike's apartment and the Record Plant studio.

Paul's Boutique did not match the sales of the Beastie Boys' 1986 debut Licensed to Ill and was promoted minimally by Capitol. However, it became recognized as the group's breakthrough achievement, with its innovative lyrical and sonic style earning the group a position as critical favorites within the hip-hop community. Sometimes described as the "Sgt. Pepper of hip-hop", Paul's Boutique has placed on several lists of the greatest albums of all time, and is viewed by many critics as a landmark album of golden age hip-hop and a seminal work in sampledelia. It was certified gold in the US in 1989 and double platinum in 1999.

== Background ==
The Beastie Boys released their debut album, Licensed to Ill, in 1986. It was a commercial success and was acclaimed by mainstream and hip-hop music critics, although its simple, heavy beats and humorous juvenile lyrics led to criticism as frat hip-hop. Derided as one-hit wonders and estranged from their previous producer, Rick Rubin, and their record label, Def Jam, the Beastie Boys were in self-imposed exile in Los Angeles during early 1988, after being written off by most music critics. For their second album, the Beastie Boys signed with Capitol Records and EMI Records. They focused on making an album with more creative depth and less commercial material.

== Production ==
Put together on samplers with tiny memories, small fragments of staggeringly disparate musics drop in, then are snatched away abruptly; rhythms and melodies remain in focus as textures and sounds constantly shift.

— Mojo

Paul's Boutique was produced with the Dust Brothers, whose use of sampling helped establish the practice of multi-layered sampling as an art. While the Dust Brothers were set on making a hit record, they agreed to produce a more experimental and sonically different record. In total, 105 songs are sampled, including 24 individual samples on the last track alone. The Dust Brothers produced the backing tracks with the intention of releasing an instrumental album but were persuaded by Beastie Boys to use them as the basis of their album.

Contrary to popular belief, most of the sampling for Paul's Boutique was eventually cleared but at dramatically lower costs compared to today's rates. According to Sound on Sound, most of the samples were authorized "easily and affordably, something that [...] would be 'unthinkable' in today's litigious music industry." Mario "Mario C" Caldato Jr., the engineer on the album, said, "We realized we had spent a lot of money in the studio. We had spent about a $1/4 million in rights and licensing for samples." This type of sampling was only possible before Grand Upright Music, Ltd. v. Warner Bros. Records Inc., the landmark lawsuit against Biz Markie by Gilbert O'Sullivan, which changed hip-hop artists' approach to sampling.

Speaking about the album 20 years on, Adam Yauch said:

The Dust Brothers had a bunch of music together, before we arrived to work with them. As a result, a lot of the tracks come from songs they'd planned to release to clubs as instrumentals – "Shake Your Rump," for example. They'd put together some beats, basslines and guitar lines, all these loops together, and they were quite surprised when we said we wanted to rhyme on it, because they thought it was too dense. They offered to strip it down to just beats, but we wanted all of that stuff on there. I think half of the tracks were written when we got there, and the other half we wrote together.

All the tracks were recorded in Matt Dike's living room in Los Angeles, with the exception of "Hello Brooklyn" and "A Year and a Day" from the "B-Boy Bouillabaisse" suite; "A Year and a Day" was recorded in Yauch's apartment building in Koreatown, Los Angeles; this location was credited in the album liner notes as the Opium Den. The recordings for Paul's Boutique were later mixed by the Dust Brothers at Record Plant Studios in Los Angeles.

The album is named after a store the group made up called Paul's Boutique. On the cover of the album, the group hung a sign saying "Paul's Boutique" on an existing clothing store called Lee's Sportswear at the corner of Rivington and Ludlow streets, in Manhattan's Lower East Side.

== Packaging ==
The panoramic photograph of Ludlow Street by Jeremy Shatan.

The cover art and gatefold is a photograph of Ludlow Street (as shot from 99 Rivington Street), credited to Nathanial Hörnblowér, but shot by Jeremy Shatan, who was the original bassist for Beastie Boys, when they were known as the Young Aborigines.

== Release ==
On its initial release, Paul's Boutique was commercially unsuccessful because of its experimental and dense sampling and lyricism, in contrast to the group's previous album, Licensed to Ill. It was a commercial disappointment, peaking at number 24 on the Billboard Top R&B/Hip-Hop Albums chart, and number 14 on the Billboard 200 chart. It was certified gold in the US on September 22, 1989. In January 1999, it was certified platinum for sales of more than two million. On January 27, 2009, Paul's Boutique was rereleased in a 20th anniversary package remastered in 24-bit audio and featuring a commentary track.

== Critical reception ==
Retrospective professional ratings
Review scores
Source	Rating
AllMusic	5/5 stars
The A.V. Club	A
Christgau's Record Guide	A
Mojo	5/5 stars
NME	9/10
Pitchfork	10/10
Q	5/5 stars
Rolling Stone	5/5 stars
The Rolling Stone Album Guide	5/5 stars
Spin Alternative Record Guide	10/10

Contemporary reviews of Paul's Boutique were uniformly positive, with the production singled out for praise. David Handelman of Rolling Stone said the songs are "buoyed by the deft interplay of the three voices and a poetic tornado of imagery", featuring "equally far-flung" musical samples on an album that is "littered with bullshit tough-guy bravado, but it's clever and hilarious bullshit". Greg Kot of the Chicago Tribune commended the Dust Brothers' "deft" production and Beastie Boys' rhymes, which he called "hilarious, vicious, surreal, snotty". David Stubbs of Melody Maker agreed, praising the Dust Brothers' production and calling the record "an outrageously funky triumph". Although he felt the group's performance did not match the quality of the production, he nevertheless considered the album a welcome return for the band after a three-year hiatus. In Musician magazine, Jon Young noted the group's various pop culture references and numerous samples, and overall commended them for releasing another "classic LP".

Writing for NME, Roger Morton gave praise to Paul's Boutique, finding that in terms of "weight of ideas", Licensed to Ill "shrinks to nothing in comparison". Danny Weizmann in LA Weekly commended the group's evolution from "juvenile delinquents" on Licensed to Ill, to "psychedelic gurus". He went on to praise the Dust Brothers' production, the layers of samples, and felt the closing track "B-Boy Bouillabaisse" will "probably change the face of all hip-hop for a long time to come". He concluded his review stating: "This album will surely put an end to any notion that the Beastie Boys were a one-shot or a producer's creation." In Q, Charles Shaar Murray was less positive. He felt that the group failed to evolve from their debut, calling them "still unlistenable and uncivilized". He considered the samples "ill-matched" and the group's performance subpar.

Robert Christgau said although it "doesn't jump you the way great rap usually does", "the Beasties and Tone-Lōc's Dust Brothers have worked out a sound that sneaks up on you with its stark beats and literal-minded samples, sometimes in a disturbing way." He commended them for "bearing down on the cleverest rhymes in the biz" and wrote, "the Beasties concentrate on tall tales rather than boasting or dissing. In their irresponsible, exemplary way, they make fun of drug misuse, racism, assault and other real vices fools may accuse them of." In Christgau's Record Guide: The '80s (1990), he said the album's "high-speed volubility and riffs from nowhere will amaze and delight you", calling it "an absolutely unpretentious and unsententious affirmation of cultural diversity, of where [the group] came from and where they went from there."

== Legacy ==
Since Paul's Boutique was first released, its critical standing has improved significantly. NME critic Paul Moody found it was "still an electrifying blast of cool" in a 1994 review, viewing it as a "younger incarnation" of Ill Communication. Rob Chapman, writing for Mojo, asserted that the album "shredded the rulebook" and called it "one of the most inventive rap albums ever made". In a 2003 review for Rolling Stone, Rob Sheffield called it "a celebration of American junk culture that is still blowing minds today—even fourteen years of obsessive listening can't exhaust all the musical and lyrical jokes crammed into Paul's Boutique". In a 2009 review, Mark Kemp of Rolling Stone called the album a "hip-hop masterpiece". Nate Patrin of Pitchfork described it "a landmark in the art of sampling, a reinvention of a group that looked like it was heading for a gimmicky early dead-end, and a harbinger of the pop-culture obsessions and referential touchstones that would come to define the ensuing decades' postmodern identity". Stephen Thomas Erlewine summed the initial reaction to Paul's Boutique and praised the density that the album contains:

Musically, few hip-hop records have ever been so rich; it's not just the recontextulations of familiar music via samples, it's the flow of each song and the album as a whole, culminating in the widescreen suite that closes the record. Lyrically, the Beasties have never been better — not just because their jokes are razor-sharp, but because they construct full-bodied narratives and evocative portraits of characters and places. Few pop records offer this much to savor, and if Paul's Boutique only made a modest impact upon its initial release, over time its influence could be heard through pop and rap, yet no matter how its influence was felt, it stands alone as a record of stunning vision, maturity, and accomplishment.

In a Vibe interview the Beastie Boys, Chuck D of Public Enemy was quoted as saying that the "dirty secret" among the black hip-hop community at the time of release was that "Paul's Boutique had the best beats". During the same interview, Mike D was asked about any possible hesitation he or the band might have had regarding their overt sampling of several minutes of well-known Beatles background tracks, including the song "The End" on "The Sounds of Science". He claimed that the Beatles filed preliminary legal papers, and that his response was, "What's cooler than getting sued by the Beatles?"

In the book For Whom the Cowbell Tolls: 25 Years of Paul's Boutique, host of KDOC's Request Video Gia DeSantis discussed the appeal of the album to local markets and the missed opportunity by Capitol Records to take the album over the top. The book was a follow-up to 33 1/3's book Paul's Boutique. Noting that Paul's Boutique was less commercially successful than the group's chart-topping debut had been, Consequence's Marcus Shorter wrote, "Paul's Boutique sat at a finish line waiting for the rest of the world to catch up." In 2014, NME wrote: "The Beastie’s classic celebrates its 25th anniversary this year, and its snot-nosed, bratty brilliance remains undimmed: a masterclass in sampling, lyrical greatness and top-notch production courtesy of the Dust Brothers."

=== Accolades ===
List of the album's rankings and listings on selected publications and top album lists:

- Ranked number 5 on Slant Magazine's "Best Albums of the 1980s"
- Ranked number 37 on Blender's "The 100 Greatest American Albums of All Time"
- Ranked number 2 on Ego Trip's "Hip Hop's 25 Greatest Albums by Year (1980–1998)"
- Ranked number 125 on "Rolling Stone's 500 Greatest Albums of All Time"
- Ranked number 12 on Spin's "100 Greatest Albums, 1985–2005"
- Ranked number 74 on VH1's "Top 100 Albums"
- Ranked number 98 on Q's "Q Magazine Readers' 100 Greatest Albums Ever"
- Ranked number 3 on Pitchfork's 2002 "Top 100 Albums of the 1980s", number 15 on its 2018 "200 Best Albums of the 1980s", and number 38 on its 2025 "100 Best Rap Albums of All Time"
- Selected as one of Rolling Stone magazine's "The Essential Rock Collection"
- Selected as one of TIME magazine's "100 Greatest Albums of All TIME"
- Selected by Rhapsody as one of "The 10 Best Albums by White Rappers"

The album was also included in the book 1001 Albums You Must Hear Before You Die.

=== Beastie Boys Square ===
The historian LeRoy McCarthy began to advocate for the intersection of Ludlow and Rivington streets on the Lower East Side of Manhattan, the location of the Paul's Boutique album cover, to be renamed "Beastie Boys Square" after Adam Yauch's death in 2012. In 2014, Manhattan Community Board 3 voted against the renaming. A subsequent proposal to rename the intersection passed on July 14, 2022. The square was officially renamed on September 9, 2023, coinciding with celebrations of the 50th anniversary of hip-hop.

== Lost tracks ==
In 2013, music journalists Dan LeRoy and Peter Relic revealed that they had uncovered and restored a tape that represented Beastie Boys' first recording session in Delicious Vinyl's colloquially named Delicious Studios. The tape includes demo versions of six tracks, five of which were produced and utilized in some form on Paul's Boutique. Most notably, the track "The Jerry Lewis" was omitted. Mike D was presented with the restored version of this track in 2013, and when asked if it deserved an official release, he said "Probably not this year." After widespread publication of the story, "The Jerry Lewis" has become a highly sought-after "lost track" among dedicated fans.

== Track listing ==
All tracks are written by Beastie Boys (Mike Diamond, Adam Horovitz, Adam Yauch) and the Dust Brothers (John King, Mike Simpson, Matt Dike).

Side A
No.	Title	Length
1.	"To All the Girls"	1:29
2.	"Shake Your Rump"	3:19
3.	"Johnny Ryall"	3:00
4.	"Egg Man"	2:57
5.	"High Plains Drifter"	4:13
6.	"The Sounds of Science"	3:11
7.	"3-Minute Rule"	3:39
8.	"Hey Ladies"	3:47
Total length:		25:22

Side B
No.	Title	Length
9.	"5-Piece Chicken Dinner"	0:23
10.	"Looking Down the Barrel of a Gun"	3:28
11.	"Car Thief"	3:39
12.	"What Comes Around"	3:07
13.	"Shadrach"	4:07
14.	"Ask for Janice"	0:11
15.	"B-Boy Bouillabaisse": Some releases separate the nine sections of the "B-Boy Bouillabaisse" suite: a. "59 Chrystie Street" (0:57); b. "Get on the Mic" (1:14); c. "Stop That Train" (1:59); d. "A Year and a Day" (2:22); e. "Hello Brooklyn" (1:32); f. "Dropping Names" (1:03); g. "Lay It on Me" (0:54); h. "Mike on the Mic" (0:48); i. "A.W.O.L." (1:46)"	12:33
Total length:		27:16

Japanese bonus tracks
No.	Title	Length
16.	"33% God"	3:53
17.	"Dis Yourself in '89 (Just Do It)"	3:29
Total length:		60:25

=== Samples ===
- "To All the Girls" contains a sample of "Loran's Dance" by Idris Muhammad.
- "Shake Your Rump" contains samples from "Johnny the Fox meets Jimmy the Weed" by Thin Lizzy, "That's the Joint" by Funky 4 + 1, "8th Wonder" by Sugarhill Gang and "Unity" by James Brown and Afrika Bambaataa.
- "Johnny Ryall" contains a sample of "Momma Miss America" by Paul McCartney.
- "Egg Man" contains a sample of the "Main Title (Theme From Jaws)" composed by John Williams.
- "High Plains Drifter" contains a sample of "Those Shoes" by the Eagles.
- "The Sounds of Science" contains samples from "The End", "Sgt. Pepper's Lonely Hearts Club Band (Reprise)", "When I'm Sixty-Four" and "Back in the U.S.S.R." by the Beatles. It also contains a sample of "Don't Sniff Coke" by Pato Banton.
- "Looking Down the Barrel of a Gun" contains samples of "Put Your Hand in the Hand" by Ocean, "Last Bongo in Belgium" by the Incredible Bongo Band, "Mississippi Queen" by Mountain and "Time" by Pink Floyd.
- "Car Thief" contains a sample of Max Yasgur's opening speech from the Woodstock soundtrack.
- "What Comes Around" contains samples of "Moby Dick" by Led Zeppelin, "It's Hot Tonight" by Alice Cooper and "Put on Train" by Gene Harris.
- "Shadrach" contains samples of "Loose Booty" by Sly and the Family Stone, "Hot and Nasty" by Black Oak Arkansas and "Say What" by Trouble Funk.
- "A Year and a Day" from the "B-Boy Bouillabaisse" contains a sample of "When the Levee Breaks" by Led Zeppelin.

== Personnel ==
- Beastie Boys – production, vocals
- The Dust Brothers – production, turntables
- Mario Caldato Jr. – engineer, production on "Ask for Janice"
- Allen Abrahamson – assistant engineer
- Ricky Powell – photography
- Jeremy Shatan – photography
- Nathaniel Hörnblowér – photography
- Dominick Watkins – photography

== Charts ==
1989 weekly chart performance for Paul's Boutique
Chart (1989)	Peak position
Canada Top Albums/CDs (RPM)	30
Dutch Charts	30
Finnish Albums (Suomen virallinen lista)	30
German Charts	28
New Zealand Charts	50
Swedish Charts	38
UK Albums (OCC)	44
US Billboard 200	14
US Top R&B/Hip-Hop Albums (Billboard)	24

== Certifications ==
Certifications and sales for Paul's Boutique
Region	Certification	Certified units/sales
Canada (Music Canada)	Platinum	100,000^{^}
United Kingdom (BPI)	Gold	100,000^{‡}
United States (RIAA)	2× Platinum	2,000,000^{^}
^{^} Shipments figures based on certification alone.^{‡} Sales+streaming figures based on certification alone.

== See also ==
- Album era
