= Mario Caldato Jr. =

Brazilian-born record producer

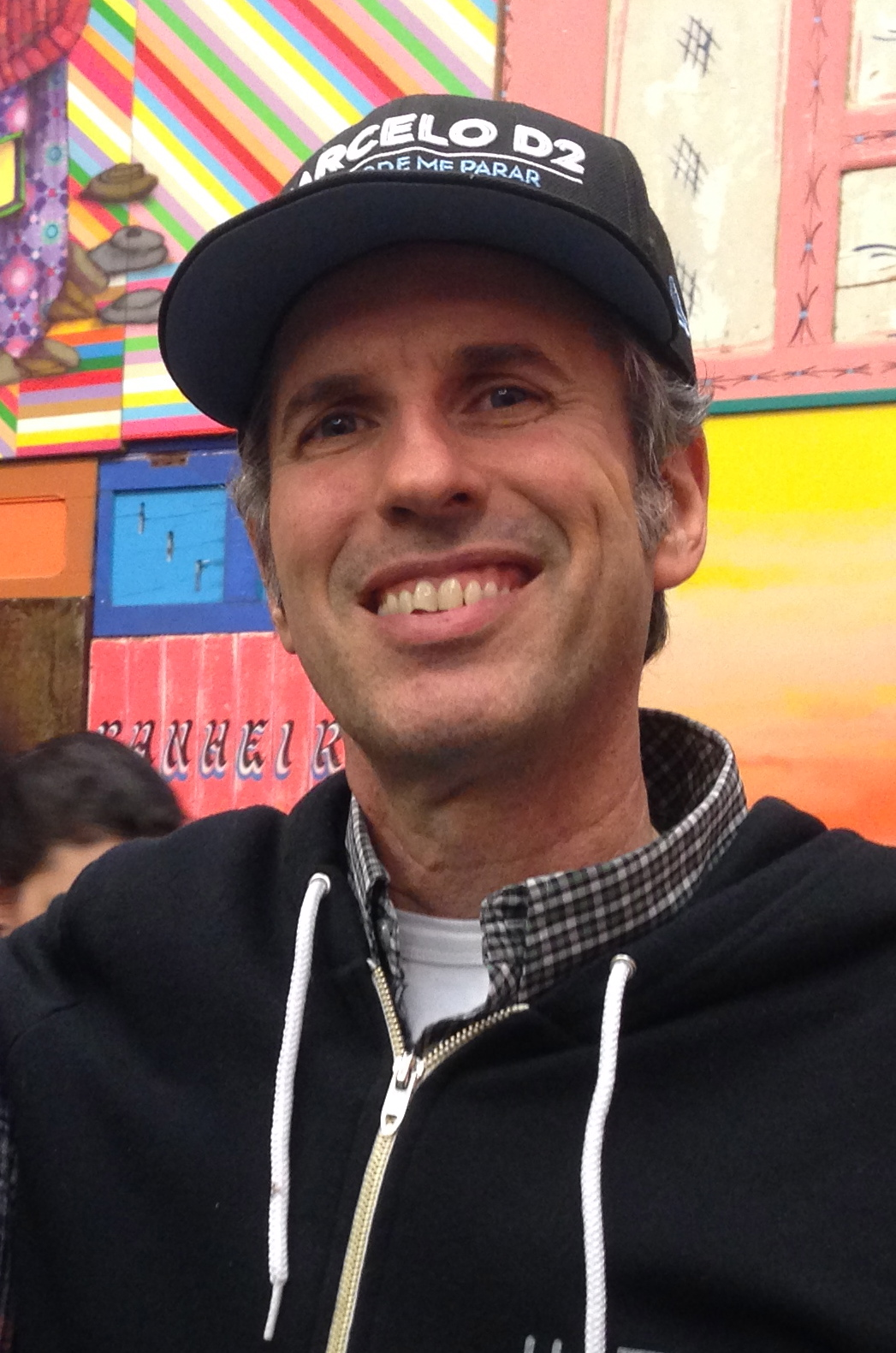

Background information
- Also known as: Mario C.
- Born: February 24, 1961 (age 65); São Paulo, Brazil
- Occupations: Producer, engineer, mixer
- Instruments: Keyboards, bass, drum programming and Efx
- Website: marioc.com

Mario Caldato Jr. (born February 24, 1961), also known as Mario C., is a Brazilian-born record producer and studio engineer best known for his work with Beastie Boys, Jack Johnson in the US, Marcelo D2 and Seu Jorge in Brazil.

== Early life ==
Caldato was born in São Paulo, Brazil. When he was two years old, his family moved to Los Angeles. Caldato began playing keyboards as a youth and took classical music lessons.

== Career ==
In 1986, Caldato met DJ Matt Dike at Los Angeles nightclub Power Tools. At Dike's request, Caldato built a recording studio in Dike's apartment, where he engineered and co-produced Tone Loc and Young MC's hit singles and albums. In 1988, Caldato began his long-term professional association with Beastie Boys when he engineered their second album, Paul's Boutique. He co-produced their albums Check Your Head, Ill Communication and Hello Nasty.

Caldato also oversaw many remixes with the Beastie Boys during the Grand Royal era, under the name The ABA All-Stars. MCA added upright bass to a remix of Bjork's Army of Me; Mike D and Money Mark added drums and vibes to Ween's Freedom of '76 for a session that director Spike Jonze attended.

Through his association with the Beastie Boys, Caldato also produced DJ Hurricane's first album, The Hurra. With Adam Horovitz, he produced two albums for the hardcore punk band D.F.L. Caldato also toured extensively worldwide with Beastie Boys during Check Your Head and Ill Communication, and mixed their live sound.

Caldato has also worked with such artists as Money Mark, Jack Johnson, Soulfly, Beck, Björk, Blur, Cibo Matto, The Cult, Day One, Los Lobos, John Lee Hooker, Manu Chao, Molotov, Super Furry Animals, Gruff Rhys, The John Butler Trio, Yoko Ono, and One Day as a Lion.

=== Work with artists in South America ===
Caldato, a Portuguese speaker, has collaborated and produced many Brazilian artists, including Planet Hemp, Marcelo D2, Seu Jorge, Nação Zumbi, Bebel Gilberto, Marisa Monte, Vanessa da Mata, Os Paralamas do Sucesso and Mallu Magalhães. In 2008 he mixed the debut album of the Argentinian group Banda de Turistas titled Magico Corazon Radiofonico. In 2010 Caldato mixed and co-produced the Seu Jorge and Almaz self-titled album released by Now-Again Records. Caldato organized, recorded and produced a charitable album with Anglo-Brazilian collaboratory supergroup, The Bottletop Band.
