= Boing =

Boing may refer to:

== Arts, entertainment, and media ==
=== Music ===
- "Boing", a song by Ween from the album The Pod
- "Boing!" (song), a 2006 song by Nik & Jay
- "Boing!", a single by DJ Quicksilver, 1996

=== Television ===
- Boing (TV channel), a brand used for children's television channels owned by Turner Broadcasting System Europe:
  - Turner Broadcasting System:
    - Boing (Africa), owned by TBS Europe
    - Boing (France), owned by TBS France
  - Mediaset:
    - Boing (Italy), owned by Mediaset and TBS Italia through joint venture Boing S.p.A.
    - Boing (Spain), owned by Mediaset España and TBS España
- Gerald McBoing-Boing (TV series), a children's television series based on the film

=== Other uses in arts, entertainment, and media ===
- Boing Boing, a group blog
- Boing! Docomodake DS, a 2007 video game
- Gerald McBoing-Boing, a 1950 animated short film

== Other uses ==
- Pascual Boing, a Mexican beverage company that produces Boing! drinks
- Boing, South Sudan, a town in Upper Nile state on the Yabus River

== See also ==
- Big Boing (disambiguation)
- Boeing, an American multinational aerospace and defense corporation
- Booing, showing displeasure by loudly yelling "Boo!" and sustaining the "oo" sound
- Boingo (disambiguation)
