= Do You Want It Right Now =

1985 song by Siedah Garrett

Single by Siedah Garrett

from the album Fast Forward
- Released: 1985
- Recorded: 1985
- Genre: Freestyle
- Length: 5:36
- Label: Qwest
- Songwriters: China Burton; Nick Straker
- Producer: Tom Bahler

Siedah Garrett singles chronology
"Curves" (1985)	"Do You Want It Right Now" (1985)	"I Just Can't Stop Loving You" (1987)

"Do You Want It Right Now" is a song by American singer Siedah Garrett from the 1985 film Fast Forward. It was a bigger hit for Degrees of Motion in 1991. It has also been recorded by Taylor Dayne for her debut studio album, Tell It to My Heart (1988). A lyric sample of it was also used in Gat Decor's song "Passion", as well as in Armand Van Helden's 2007 hit "I Want Your Soul".

== Taylor Dayne version ==
In 1988, American singer Taylor Dayne recorded her version of "Do You Want It Right Now" for her debut studio album, Tell It to My Heart (1988), and despite never being released as a single it is one of the most well-known versions of the song.

=== Critical reception ===
Andrew Panos from Number One described the song as a "saucy number", noting Dayne's "'I'm a chick who goes for what she wants' attitude". Matthew Collin from Record Mirror declared it as a "glossy pop" song, that "glow like a nuclear reactor gone critical."

== Degrees of Motion version ==
"Do You Want It Right Now"

Single by Degrees of Motion

from the album Degrees of Motion
- Released: 1991
- Genre: Dance; house
- Label: Esquire Records
- Songwriters: China Burton; Nick Straker
- Producer: Richie Jones

Degrees of Motion singles chronology
"Do You Want It Right Now" (1991)	"Shine On" (1992)

Music video
- "Do You Want It Right Now" on YouTube

American group Degrees of Motion released a version of "Do You Want It Right Now" in 1992, reaching #31 on the UK Singles Chart in May 1992. The song was re-released in 1994, peaking at #26 in June. It wasn't their most successful single, Degrees of Motion had a top 10 single with "Shine On" in 1994, prior to the re-release of Do You Want it Right Now?. It featured Biti Strauchn on vocals. British magazine Mixmag ranked the song number 54 in its "100 Greatest Dance Singles Of All Time" list in 1996.

=== Critical reception ===
Larry Flick from Billboard magazine wrote, "Producer Ric Wake has previously been at the helm for hits by pop divas like Mariah Carey and Taylor Dayne—and his magic touch is warmly felt here. Sizzling, seductive vocals jump over percussive, bass-driven synth instrumentation." Electronic dance and clubbing magazine Mixmag commented, "'Good groovy tune', said the sticker in the record shop. Fiver for an import. Snapped it up and I've played it ever since, Biti's optimistic love-song vocal swaying high above an uproarious, lean 'n' funky piano groove. It became a big club hit when FFRR picked it up for release and remains a classic because, well, it just is."

Andy Beevers from Music Week felt the song "is a superb commercial garage out that was a club fave on US import. Given some mainstream radio play, it could well follow in the footsteps of 'Too Blind to See It' and 'Finally'." On the 1994 re-release, Alan Jones gave it four out of five and named it Pick of the Week, calling it a "glorious house anthem", adding, "Watch it fly." Seamus Quinn from NME named it Single of the Week, stating that the original 'King Street Mix' "is practically perfect: shuffling heavy drums and sub bass rhythm, brilliant horns, disco guitar licks and smooth organs. The happy "so in love" vocals are a dream." James Hamilton from the Record Mirror Dance Update remarked that "this Richie Jones produced breathily surging diva wailed garage shuffler" has the "current sound" with keyboards by Eric Kupper. Alex Kadis from Smash Hits wrote, "Well, it's a strapping dancerama of a song and deserves more recognition than it got last time around".

=== Impact and legacy ===
In 1995, British DJ Dave Lambert picked "Do You Want It Right Now" as one of his "classic cuts", calling it a "gorgeous garage classic. Perfect end of the night tune."

In 1996, British DJ duo Sharp Boyz chose the track as one of their favourites. George Mitchell said, "It's a favourite of ours, the best vocal-with-piano track ever made. It's so uplifting, you never get tired of it. It gives me goose pimples."

=== Track listing ===
- 12", US (1991)
1. "Do You Want It Right Now" (King St. Mix) – 9:00
2. "Do You Want It Right Now" (Bump Mix) – 5:15
3. "Do You Want It Right Now" (Extended Club Mix) – 7:50
4. "Do You Want It Right Now" (Motion Beats) – 5:00
5. "Do You Want It Right Now" (Biti-Pella) – 3:10
- 12", UK (1992)
1. "Do You Want It Right Now" (King St. Mix) – 9:17
2. "Do You Want It Right Now" (Extended Club Mix) – 7:55
3. "Do You Want It Right Now" (Scream Up Mix) – 11:33
4. "Do You Want It Right Now" (Ministry Vocal Mix) – 6:48
- CD single, UK (1994)
1. "Do You Want It Right Now" (King Street Edit) – 4:05
2. "Do You Want It Right Now" (Richie's '94 Edit) – 4:24
3. "Do You Want It Right Now" (King Street Mix) – 9:19
4. "Do You Want It Right Now" (Richie's '94 MiX) – 9:18
5. "Do You Want It Right Now" ('94 Dub) – 7:33
- CD maxi, Europe (1994)
1. "Do You Want It Right Now" (King Street Edit) – 4:05
2. "Do You Want It Right Now" (Richie's '94 Edit) – 4:25
3. "Do You Want It Right Now" (King Street Mix) – 9:20
4. "Do You Want It Right Now" (Richie's '94 Mix) – 7:09

=== Charts ===
==== Weekly charts ====
Chart (1992)	Peak position
Europe (European Dance Radio)	17
UK Singles (OCC)	31
UK Airplay (Music Week)	23
UK Dance (Music Week)	2
UK Club Chart (Music Week)	1

Chart (1994)	Peak position
Scotland (OCC)	46
UK Singles (OCC)	26
UK Dance (OCC)	24
UK Dance (Music Week)	2
UK Club Chart (Music Week)	12

==== Year-end charts ====
Chart (1992)	Position
UK Club Chart (Music Week)	3

== Gat Decor version ==
Gat Decor released an instrumental Ibiza anthem called "Passion" in 1992, it peaked at #29 on the UK Singles Chart. Four years later the instrumental was remixed and re-released as "Passion (Do You Want it Right Now Edit)" with the vocals by Beverly Skeete. This became the biggest hit version of "Do You Want it Right Now", peaking at #6 on the UK Singles Chart in March 1996.
