= Live'r Than You'll Ever Be – Bestival 2007 =

Live album by The Kleptones
- Released: December 2007
- Recorded: 2007
- Genre: Bastard pop
- Length: 1:02:23
- Producer: The Kleptones

The Kleptones chronology
'24 Hours' (2006)	Live'r Than You'll Ever Be – Bestival 2007 (2007)	'Uptime / Downtime' (2010)

Live'r Than You'll Ever Be – Bestival 2007 is a recording of a show by The Kleptones at the 2007 Bestival. The title is taken from the celebrated 1969 Rolling Stones bootleg.

== Track listing ==
1. "Precession" 2:32
2. "See" 3:33
  - Queen, "One Vision"
  - Quentin Harris, "Let's Be Young"
  - KRS-One, "Hip Hop v. Rap"
  - Grandmaster Flash and the Furious Five, "The Message"
  - Kelis, "Milkshake"
  - vocals same as ANatHHg
3. "War of Confusion" 3:24
  - Edwin Starr, "War"
  - Genesis, "Land of Confusion"
  - Cypress Hill, "Insane in the Brain"
4. "Life in the E-Pro" 1:38
  - The Eagles, "Life in the Fast Lane"
  - Rage Against the Machine, "Bullet in the Head"
  - Beck, "E-Pro"
  - Run D.M.C., "King of Rock"
5. "Black Cocaine" 1:30
  - Run D.M.C., "King of Rock"
  - AC/DC, "Back in Black"
  - Eric Clapton, "Cocaine"
6. "Need You This Way" 2:34
  - Aerosmith, "Walk This Way"
  - INXS, "Need You Tonight"
  - Indeep, "Buffalo Boys"
7. "Cowboy's Delight" 0:48
  - The Sugarhill Gang, "Rapper's Delight"
8. "Delight Years" 2:09
  - The Sugarhill Gang, "Rapper's Delight"
  - The Rolling Stones, "2000 Light Years from Home"
  - David Bowie, "Golden Years"
  - Prince, "Housequake"
9. "Bite" 3:28
  - Ol' Dirty Bastard, "Got Your Money"
  - Queen, "Another One Bites the Dust"
10. "Can't Breathe" 1:49
  - Q-Tip, "Breathe and Stop"
  - Hall & Oates, "I Can't Go for That"
  - Spin Doctors, "Two Princes"
11. "Know How Frogs Function" 3:04
  - Shorty Long, "Function at the Junction"
  - The Doors, "Peace Frog"
12. "Cymbalicker" 4:23
  - Aphex Twin, "Windowlicker"
  - Bon Jovi, "You Give Love a Bad Name"
  - Brian Fahey and his Orchestra, "At the Sign of the Swingin' Cymbal"
13. "Underground Hand" 5:34
  - Queen, "It's a Kind of Magic"
  - Aerosmith, "Dude Looks Like a Lady"
  - Nine Inch Nails, "The Hand That Feeds"
  - The White Stripes, "The Hardest Button to Button"
  - Tori Amos, "Professional Widow"
14. "Wayward Beats" 0:43
  - Kansas, "Carry On Wayward Son"
  - Justice, "We Are Your Friends"
15. "Second Hand Volume" 2:09
  - Fleetwood Mac, "Second Hand News"
  - M.A.R.R.S., "Pump Up the Volume"
16. "Three Girl Bump" 2:26
  - Spank Rock (w/Amanda Blank), "Bump"
  - Wire, "Three Girl Rhumba"
  - Trio, "Da Da Da"
17. "Inferno" 2:12
  - The Trammps, "Disco Inferno"
  - Ash, "Burn Baby Burn"
  - Van Halen, "Jump"
  - Amy Winehouse, "Rehab"
  - Britney Spears, "Toxic"
18. "Hella Phat" 3:32
  - Leftfield, "Phat Planet"
  - Britney Spears, "Toxic"
  - No Doubt, "Hella Good"
  - Madonna, "Music"
19. "Run Outside" 2:53
  - Martha and the Vandellas, "Nowhere to Run"
  - George Michael, "Outside"
20. "Uptight Jet" 3:05
  - Stevie Wonder, "Uptight (Everything's All Right)"
  - Jet, "Get What You Need"
21. "22 Grand Hop" 2:03
  - Dead Prez, "It's Bigger Than Hip Hop"
  - The Rakes - "22 Grand Job"
22. "Break On Miserlou" 6:52
  - The Doors, "Break On Through"
  - audio clip from Pulp Fiction
  - Dick Dale and the Del-Tones, "Miserlou"
