= Uptime / Downtime =

Remix album by The Kleptones
- Released: January 2010
- Genre: Bastard pop
- Length: 2:32:17
- Producer: The Kleptones

The Kleptones chronology
Live'r Than You'll Ever Be (2007)	Uptime / Downtime (2010)	Shits & Giggles (2010)

Uptime / Downtime is a 2010 mashup double album by The Kleptones.

== Track listing ==
=== Uptime ===
1. Call To Mind - 2:30
  - Samples - Jim Steinman - Love, Death, and an American Guitar
2. Voodoo Sabotage - 4:32
  - Sound Bites - Cheap Trick - I want you to want me (announcement of next song Surrender at the end of live version)
  - Samples - Beastie Boys - Sabotage
  - Samples - The Prodigy - Voodoo People (Pendulum Remix)
3. Welcome Back - 5:04
  - Samples - Boney M. - Rivers of Babylon
  - Samples - Emerson, Lake & Palmer - Karn Evil 9
  - Samples - Guns N' Roses - Welcome to the Jungle
  - Samples - The Chemical Brothers - Hey Boy Hey Girl which samples - Rock Master Scott & the Dynamic Three - The Roof Is on Fire
  - Samples - Basement Jaxx - Where's Your Head At?
  - Samples - Missy Elliott - Lose Control (which samples Cybotron - Clear)
  - Samples - LFO - LFO
  - Samples - Meat Beat Manifesto - Radio Babylon (which samples Boney M - Rivers of Babylon)
  - Samples - Joey Beltram - Energy Flash
  - Samples - The Future Sound of London - We Have Explosive
4. Hella Touch - 4:32
  - Samples - No Doubt - Hella Good
  - Samples - Busta Rhymes - Don't Touch Me (Throw Da Water On 'Em)
  - Samples - The Flying Pickets - Only You (Yazoo cover)
  - Samples - Diana Ross - Upside Down
5. Can't Be Paranoid - 2:33
  - Samples - Genesis - I Can't Dance
  - Samples - Garbage - I Think I'm Paranoid
  - Samples - B-Line - Herbal Hand (which samples Herbie Hancock - Hang Up Your Hang Ups)
  - Samples - Diana Ross - Upside Down
6. Care - 3:43
  - Samples - Faith No More - We Care a Lot
  - Sound bites - Batman, The Joker: "Gentlemen, let's broaden our minds"
7. Deeper Sand - 3:14
  - Samples - Aretha Franklin - A Deeper Love
  - Samples - Metallica - Enter Sandman
  - Samples - Electric Light Orchestra - Fire on High
  - Sound bites -The 'Burbs
  - Sound bites - Michael Mills - Radio Show: Hidden and Satanic Messages in Rock Music
8. MKY Da HVN - 4:54
  - Samples - Nas - Hip Hop Is Dead
  - Samples - Iron Butterfly - In-A-Gadda-Da-Vida
  - Samples - Cream - Sunshine of Your Love
  - Samples - Munk - Live fast, die old
  - Samples - The Pixies - Monkey Gone to Heaven
  - Samples - Rage Against the Machine - Killing in the Name
9. Come Again - 8:12
  - Samples - The Beatles - Come Together
  - Samples - Dezo - Y'all Know What It Iz
  - Samples - Lil Wayne - Best Rapper Alive
  - Samples - Beastie Boys - No Sleep till Brooklyn
  - Samples - Breakwater - Release The Beast
  - Samples - Rare Earth - I Just Want to Celebrate
  - Samples - Queen & David Bowie - Under Pressure
  - Samples - Cypress Hill - Insane in the Brain
  - Samples - John Lennon - Power to the People
  - Samples - Boston - More Than a Feeling
  - Samples - Freeez - I.O.U.
  - Samples - Criminal Element Orchestra - Put The Needle to the Record
  - Samples - Art of Noise - Close (to the Edit)
  - Samples - S'Express - Theme from S'Express
10. Destiny And Tenacity - 6:45
  - Samples - Genesis - Turn It on Again
  - Samples - Simple Minds - New Gold Dream (81-82-83-84)
  - Samples - Art of Noise - Close (to the Edit)
  - Samples - U.S.U.R.A. - Open Your Mind
  - Samples - Richie Havens - Going Back to My Roots
  - Samples - A. R. Rahman & M.I.A. - O…Saya
  - Samples - Dizzee Rascal & Armand Van Helden - Bonkers
  - Samples - Kicksquad - Soundclash (Champion Sound)
  - Samples - The Hives - Tick Tick Boom
11. Cubikini - 3:20
  - Samples - S'Express - Theme from S'Express
  - Samples - Bikini Kill - Rebel Girl
  - Samples - Bizarre Inc - Playing with Knives
  - Samples - 808 State - Cubik
  - Samples - Chemical Brothers - Song to the Siren
12. Brightness And Contrast - 5:47
  - Samples - Pixies - La La Love You
  - Samples - MC Hammer - U Can't Touch This
  - Samples - New Order - Blue Monday
  - Samples - Nirvana - On a Plain
  - Samples - Bruce Springsteen - 57 Channels (And Nothin' On)
  - Samples - The Cure - The Hanging Garden
13. The Highest Kite - 4:03
  - Samples - Weezer - Troublemaker
  - Samples - Hot Chip - Ready for the Floor
  - Samples - Saxon - Dallas 1PM
  - Samples - Motörhead - We Are the Road Crew
  - Samples - The Prodigy - Charly
  - Samples - Purple Ribbon All-Stars - Kryptonite (I'm on It)
  - Samples - Nine Inch Nails - Discipline
  - Samples - Rusko - Cockney Thug (Caspa Remix)
14. Body Jump - 3:17
  - Samples - Caper ft Sweetie Irie - Jump Up
  - Samples - DJ C & Zulu - Body Work
15. Nothing Beats A Large - 3:12
  - Samples - Aphrodite - King of the Beats (which samples Pumpkin and The Profile All-Stars "Here Comes That Beat")
  - Samples - Ultramagnetic MCs - Poppa Large
  - Samples - Average White Band - Pick Up the Pieces
  - Samples - Madonna - Frozen
  - Samples - Gat Decor - Passion
16. Mad Groove - 5:44
  - Samples - Gat Decor - Passion
  - Samples - Sub Focus - Rock It
  - Samples - Yellow Magic Orchestra - Behind the Mask (Orbital Remix)
  - Sound bites - Peter Finch - Mad As Hell (speech from Network)
  - Samples - Kraftwerk - Tour de France
  - Samples - Double 99 - RIP Groove
  - Samples - Shut Up And Dance - Green Man (or 'The Rain' by Ryuichi Sakamoto which it samples)
17. This Song Smells - 4:19
  - Sound bites - Donald Sutherland - Wedding sermon from Little Murders
  - Sound bites - Roger Hill - Cyrus' speech from The Warriors
  - Samples - Nirvana - Smells Like Teen Spirit
  - Samples - Blur - Song 2
18. Final Word - 0:55
  - Sound bites - Bill Drummond - Foreword to German audiobook version of The Manual
  - Samples - Prefab Sprout - When Love Breaks Down

=== Downtime ===
1. Interlude - 4:37
  - Sound bites - Graham Crowden - Professor Millar introducing the Genesis Project (from Britannia Hospital)
  - Samples - Karlheinz Stockhausen - Stimmung
  - Samples - Le Système Crapoutchik - Aussi Loin Que Je Me Souvienne
2. Freeze - 2:53
  - Samples - Scott Walker - 30 Century Man
  - Samples - Philip Glass - Knee 1 (from Einstein on the Beach)
  - Sound bites - Bob Dylan - "I don't believe you" (from The Bootleg Series Vol. 4: Bob Dylan Live 1966, The "Royal Albert Hall" Concert)
  - Sound bites - Ginger Lynn (from Metallica - "Turn The Page" music video)
3. Seed Of Idumea - 3:54
  - Samples - Current 93 - Idumæa (Vocals: Antony Hegarty)
  - Samples - The Seeds - Faded Picture
4. Stay - 4:49
  - Samples - Yeah Yeah Yeahs - Maps
  - Sound bites - Al Pacino and Paul Sorvino - Dialogue from Cruising
5. Untired - 6:03
  - Samples - Foo Fighters - Tired of You
6. Hammer - 5:59
  - Samples - Sensational Alex Harvey Band - Hammer Song
  - Samples - David Sylvian - The Healing Place
  - Samples - Brand X - Isis Mourning (Part II)
7. Black Medicine - 8:32
  - Sound bites - Dialogue from The Decline of Western Civilization
  - Samples - John Mayall - Medicine Man
  - Samples - Nick Drake - Black Eyed Dog
  - Samples - Peter Gabriel - Lead a Normal Life
  - Sound bites - Dark Star - Computer, various warning messages
8. Unbroken - 2:14
  - Sound bites - John Lennon - 1971 Rolling Stone interview
9. Correspondence - 9:17
  - Samples - David Bowie - Warszawa
  - Samples - Neil Young - Words (Between the Lines of Age)
  - Samples - Pearl Jam - Alive
  - Samples - Rush - Closer to the Heart
  - Samples - The Planets - Lines
  - Samples - Ian Dury - Deus Ex Machina (video game)
  - Sound bites - Harry Dean Stanton - Dialogue from the 1996 spoken word adaptation of Fear and Loathing in Las Vegas
10. Incandescence - 3:14
  - Samples - ZZ Top - Hot, Blue, & Righteous
11. Exit - 3:02
  - Samples - John Mayall - Fly Tomorrow
  - Samples - Beck - Farewell Ride
  - Samples - Aesop Rock & Del tha Funkee Homosapien - Preservation (which samples Mike Brant - Mais Dans La Lumière)
12. Entrance - 6:52
  - Sound bites - Michael Moorcock & The Deep Fix - Narration 3 from New Worlds Fair
  - Samples - Nick Cave and the Bad Seeds - Messiah Ward
  - Samples - Dorothy Ashby - For Some We Loved
  - Samples - Black Rebel Motorcycle Club - As Sure as the Sun
  - Samples - Dinosaur Jr. - Feel the Pain
  - Samples - Neil Young - After the Gold Rush
  - Samples - Adam and the Ants - Prince Charming
  - Sound bites - Michael Moorcock & The Deep Fix - Narration 4 from New Worlds Fair
  - Sound bites - Dialogue from The Decline of Western Civilization
13. Killing Jah - 6:35
  - Sound bites - Dialogue from The Decline of Western Civilization
  - Samples - Siouxsie and the Banshees - The Killing Jar
  - Samples - Thompson Twins - Kamikaze/Frozen in Time
14. Resignation - 7:40
  - Samples - Marianne Faithfull - I Ain't Goin' Down to the Well No More
  - Samples - Poco - Magnolia
  - Sound bites - Paul Newman - Dialogue from Cool Hand Luke

The cover is from a photo from Yonge–Dundas Square (now Sankofa Square).
