= EP2 (Kleptones EP) =

EP by The Kleptones
- Released: 2006
- Recorded: Winter 2005–2006
- Genre: Bastard pop
- Length: 18:11
- Producer: The Kleptones

The Kleptones chronology
'EP1' (2006)	EP2 (2006)	'EP3' (2006)

EP2 is a 2006 bastard pop EP by The Kleptones. This is the second in a series of three EPs that were released in the three weeks preceding the release of the double album, 24 Hours.

The first track of this EP is included on the album, 24 Hours, although the audio clips sampled are not the same. The remaining tracks are B-sides, which are no longer obtainable on the official site of The Kleptones.

== Track listing ==
1. "11:00 - C.A.E" – 4:09
  - Samples - The Clash - Rock the Casbah
  - Samples - David Bowie - It Ain't Easy
2. "Eyesight To The Killer – 5:14
  - Samples - Wesley Willis
    - "Rock music pays off. Rock music takes me on a joyride. Rock music keeps me off the hell city bus. Rock music will always look out for me. But I will not let my tortured profanity shoot it down."
  - Samples - Sonny Boy Williamson II - Eyesight to the Blind
  - Samples - Adamski - Killer
  - Samples - ETA - Casual Sub (Burning Spear)
3. "Tronolith – 3:14
  - Samples - Mick Jagger
    - "We're going to do a slow blues for you now people."
  - Samples - T. Rex - Monolith
  - Samples - Deltron 3030 - Love Story
  - Samples - The White Stripes - Truth Doesn't Make A Noise
4. "Thieving Up The Bob – 5:34
  - Samples - Bob Dylan - You're a Big Girl Now
