= Shits & Giggles =

Remix album by The Kleptones
- Released: August 2010
- Genre: Bastard pop
- Length: 1:19:49
- Producer: The Kleptones

The Kleptones chronology
Uptime / Downtime (2010)	Shits & Giggles (2010)	OV (2018)

Shits & Giggles is a 2010 mashup album by The Kleptones. It is a compilation of old songs that did not fit into the previous albums. Some songs date back to 2004 when the album A Night At The Hip-Hopera was released. In 2025 a follow-up compilation named Shirts & Gurgles with even more ill-fitting mashups was released.

== Track listing ==
1. Surf Mountain - 4:13
  - Samples - Jane's Addiction - Mountain Song
  - Samples - Trentemøller - Silver Surfer, Ghost Rider Go!!!
2. Sick Mouth - 3:54
  - Samples - Queens of the Stone Age - Sick Sick Sick
  - Samples - Foxy Brown feat. Sizzla - Come Fly With Me
3. Gimme Gimme - 4:29
  - Samples - Black Sabbath - Supernaut
  - Samples - Rolling Stones - Gimme Shelter
  - Samples - Rick James - Give It to Me Baby
4. Flik Flok - 3:42
  - Samples - Ke$ha - TiK ToK
  - Samples - Dizzee Rascal - Flex
5. Saturday White - 4:53
  - Samples - Elton John - Saturday Night's Alright (For Fighting)
  - Samples - Billy Idol - White Wedding, Pt. 1
6. Kool Hunting - 3:36
  - Samples - The Police - Synchronicity II
  - Samples - Sonic Youth - Kool Thing
  - Samples - Bloc Party - Hunting for Witches
7. Electric Boing - 3:52
  - Samples - Foals - Electric Bloom
  - Samples - Nik & Jay - Boing!
8. Rocksteady Clash - 3:09
  - Samples - Zoe - Rock Steady
  - Samples - The Clash - Train in Vain
9. Dubby Monks - 3:46
  - Samples - Red Hot Chili Peppers - Funky Monks
  - Samples - Latyrx - Lady Don't Tek No
10. Dub It Away - 4:23
  - Samples - Red Hot Chili Peppers - Give It Away
11. Kill - 3:11
  - Samples - Queen - Death on Two Legs (Dedicated to...)
  - Samples - Kool Keith - Recoupment (Skit)
  - Samples - Frontline - The Way The Music Died
12. Smash - 3:42
  - Samples - Queen - Hammer to Fall
  - Samples - Sirius B. Feat. HardyHard - Tellievision
  - Samples - Chicks on Speed - Wordy Rappinghood
13. Psycho Dreams - 4:11
  - Samples - Talking Heads - Psycho Killer
  - Samples - Fleetwood Mac - Dreams
14. Rodeo Street - 4:02
  - Samples - Blackstreet - No Diggity
  - Soundbites - Pete Townshend - The Kids Are Alright
15. Lung Cancer - 5:01
  - Samples - Amerie - Take Control
  - Samples - Radiohead - My Iron Lung
  - Soundbites - "Drimble Wedge and the Vegetation!" - Bedazzled
16. Lost In The Ballroom - 4:24
  - Samples - Sweet - The Ballroom Blitz
  - Samples - Ali Love - K-Hole
17. Heydrum - 3:49
  - Samples - Florence and the Machine - Drumming Song
  - Samples - No Doubt - Hey Baby
18. Hit Me With Your Numbers - 3:00
  - Samples - Kraftwerk - Numbers
  - Samples - Pat Benatar - Hit Me With Your Best Shot
19. Lazy Dancer - 3:55
  - Samples - Silversun Pickups - Lazy Eye
  - Samples - Yuksek - I Could Never Be A Dancer
20. Unwanted Whisper - 4:37
  - Samples - Bon Jovi - Wanted Dead or Alive
  - Samples - George Michael - Careless Whisper
  - Soundbites - Reg Presley - The Troggs Tapes
