= EP1 (Kleptones EP) =

EP by The Kleptones
- Released: 2006
- Recorded: Winter 2005–2006
- Genre: Bastard pop
- Length: 14:47
- Producer: The Kleptones

The Kleptones chronology
From Detroit to J.A. (2005)	EP1 (2006)	EP2 (2006)

EP1 is a 2006 bastard pop EP by The Kleptones. This is the first in a series of three EPs that were released in the three weeks preceding the release of the double album, 24 Hours.

The first track of this EP is included on the album, 24 Hours, although the audio clips sampled are not the same. The remaining tracks are B-sides, which are no longer obtainable on the official site of The Kleptones.

== Track listing ==
1. "2100 - Uptight Jet" – 4:07
  - Samples - Stevie Wonder - Uptight (Everything's Alright)
  - Samples - Jet - Get What You Need
2. "I Want Jah Back" – 3:49
  - Samples - The Jackson 5 - I Want You Back
3. "Take Me In Your Broken Arms" – 3:35
  - Samples - The Isley Brothers - Take Me In Your Arms
  - Samples - Lexicon - Brokenhearted
4. "Jeepster Riddim" – 3:45
  - Samples - William Shatner featuring Henry Rollins - I Can't Get Behind That
    - "Can you turn around, do one more?" "Always can do one more." "Let's hit it."
  - Samples - Seeed - Lock Down
  - Samples - T. Rex - Jeepster
  - Samples - Waking Life
    - "Umm, pick a colour" "Blue" "B-L-U-E, pick a number" "Eight" "One-Two-Three-Four-Five-Six-Seven-Eight, pick one more number" "Fifteen" "One-Two-Three-Four-Five-Six-Seven-Eight-Nine-Ten-Eleven-Twelve-Thirteen-Fourteen-Fifteen, pick another number" "Six" "Okay ... Dream is Destiny."
