= 24 Hours (The Kleptones album) =

24 Hours – A drama in two acts

Remix album by The Kleptones
- Released: March 2006
- Recorded: 2005–2006
- Genre: Bastard pop
- Length: 2:16:24
- Producer: The Kleptones

The Kleptones chronology
EP3 (2006)	24 Hours – A drama in two acts (2006)	Live'r Than You'll Ever Be (2007)

24 Hours is a 2006 mashup double concept album by The Kleptones. Like other albums by The Kleptones, the album intersperses quotes from movies and television in its songs.

In the three weeks preceding the online release, an EP was released weekly which featured one song along with two to three b-sides which were not included on the album.

On 16 May 2006, an edited version of the track "19:00 Careless Or Dead" was posted on the Bootie website under the title "Careless Or Dead (Bootie Version)".

== Track listing ==
1. "07:00 – Still Start" – 3:03
  - Samples – Thomas Newman – American Beauty soundtrack
  - Samples – Fatboy Slim – Weapon of Choice
  - Samples – Underworld – Pearl's Girl
  - Samples – Will Smith – Gettin' Jiggy Wit It
  - Samples – Foo Fighters – Still
  - Samples – Laurie Anderson – O Superman
  - Samples – Global Communication – 14:31
  - Samples - Apocalyptica - The Unforgiven
2. "07:30 – Up" – 1:36
  - Samples – AC/DC – For Those About to Rock (We Salute You)
  - Samples – Harry Nilsson – Jump Into the Fire
  - A spoof morning radio show is heard featuring Manchester comedian Nick Fraser and DJ Laurie Laptop
3. "08:10 – Down On Bennies" – 3:36
  - Samples – Elton John – Bennie and the Jets
  - Samples – Rage Against the Machine – Down on the Street
4. "08:35 – Kick The Bus, Kick The Train" – 4:13
  - Samples – Steve Miller Band – Fly Like an Eagle
  - Samples – ZZ Top – Waitin' for the Bus
  - Samples – White Stripes – Hello Operator
  - Samples – Dilated Peoples – Bullet Train
  - Samples – Korn & the Dust Brothers – Kick the P.A.
5. "09:00 – Daft Purple" – 4:06
  - Samples – The Breakfast Club
    - "Well, well. Here we are." | "What can I say? I'm thrilled." | "I want to congratulate you for being on time."
  - Samples – Deep Purple – Fireball
  - Samples – Marshall McLuhan/Quentin Fiore/Jerome Agel – The Medium Is The Massage (Columbia LP, 1968)
    - "Ours is a brand new world of all-at-once-ness..."
  - Samples – Daft Punk – Harder, Better, Faster, Stronger
  - Samples – Daft Punk – Technologic
  - Samples – Hijack – The Badman is Robbin'
    - "Pow! Automatic, feel the panic, got to have ya. I'm the joker, i'm smoker..."
  - Samples – Pink Floyd – Money
  - Samples – Jethro Tull – War Child
    - "Would you like another cup of tea, dear?"
6. "10:25 – Sixteen Sisters" – 2:50
  - Samples – Paul Morley
    - "Cell phones, faxes, voicemail, pagers, couriers, email, radio, catalogues....."
  - Samples – Madonna – Hung Up
  - Samples – Harry Nilsson – Sixteen Tons
  - Samples – The Soundtrack of Our Lives – Sister Surround
7. "11:00 – Casbah Ain't Easy" – 4:27
  - Samples – Purple Rain
    - "That's life, man." | "Life my ass, motherfucker! This is a business, and you ain't too far gone to see that yet."
  - Samples – The Clash – Rock the Casbah
  - Samples – David Bowie – It Ain't Easy
  - Samples – Tha Alkaholiks – J-Ro Late Skit
  - Samples – Dilbert
    - "Remember, the first rule of brainstorming is to openly mock the opinions of others."
  - Samples – Another State of Mind
    - "There's — we're just living in too fast of a society, it's like — nobody has... a lot of people don't have time to do that, they're so preoccupied with other things"
8. "11:50 – Closer to the Boxer" – 4:55
  - Samples – Waking Life
    - "It might be true that there are six billion people in this world, and counting, but nevertheless – what you do makes a difference. It makes a difference, first of all, in material terms, it makes a difference to other people, and it sets an example. In short, I think the message here is..."
  - Samples – Asheru & Blue Black of the Unspoken Heard feat. Lone Catalysts – Think About
  - Samples – The Cure – Close to Me
  - Samples – Simon & Garfunkel – The Boxer
9. "12:30 – Nu Rip Off" – 3:29
  - Samples – Ozzy Osbourne
    - "Fuck that business shit man. Just give me cocaine and drugs and a flash car and a night club and a couple of groupies and I'll be sound you know."
  - Samples – Attack of the Show – Kevin Pereira
    - Insulting Kevin Federline appearing in a video where he displays his new song – "I gotta say like, I.. I respect artists, don't get me wrong, but this is something anybody could whip up in 10 minutes with GarageBand. And watch as the moron at the mixing board, like just loved his pathetic little track. Yeah, exactly."
    - "That's the fire! | That's the fire. | Fire! | That's the fire."
  - Samples – DJ Nu-Mark – Imagine – John Lennon cover
  - Samples – T. Rex – Rip-Off
  - Samples – The Jetsons – Uniblab
    - "Back to work, back to work! Everybody; work, work, work, work!"
10. "13:30 – The Black Devil Is Not Enough" – 3:29
  - Samples – Hitchhiker's Guide to the Galaxy (BBC Radio Drama)
    - "Aahhhhhh" – Sirius Cybernetics Corporation door with a 'Genuine People Personality'
  - Samples – Footloose
    - "You know what it is, you've got an attitude problem. | Oh, I've got an attitude problem? | I'm not the only one who's noticed."
  - Samples – Bill Hicks
    - "I don't fit in anywhere, man. I really don't. I don't agree with anything either, not even what I just said, so I think you see the fucking problem here."
  - Samples – Nine Inch Nails – Love is Not Enough
  - Samples – The Doors – An American Prayer
    - "We're perched headlong on the edge of boredom. We're trying for something that has already found us."
  - Samples – Jarvis Cocker
    - "It's a bit like Groundhog Day..."
11. "14:40 – Quicksilver Manuva" – 5:16
  - Samples – Quicksilver Messenger Service – Fire Brothers
  - Samples – Perry Farrell – Letters to Xiola
  - Samples – This Mortal Coil – Firebrothers
  - Samples – Roots Manuva – Motion 5000
  - Samples – Irene Handl – Metal Mickey
    - "Oi! Wake up! You'll have to go in there, dear, it's gettin' a bit much, I can't cope!"
12. "16:05 – Unfinished Turkey" – 4:38
  - Samples – Massive Attack – Unfinished Sympathy
  - Samples – John Lennon & The Plastic Ono Band – Cold Turkey
  - Samples – Napoleon Dynamite
    - "Gosh!"
  - Samples – Bill Hicks
    - "I know it doesn't make a lot of sense, but work with me on this..."
13. "17:00 – Run Outside" – 3:02
  - Samples – George Michael – Outside
  - Samples – Martha and the Vandellas – Nowhere to Run
  - Samples – Bernard Herrmann – Theme from Twisted Nerve
  - Samples – Kill Bill
14. "17:30 – Know How Frogs Function" – 3:23
  - Samples – The Doors – Peace Frog
  - Samples – Shorty Long – Function at the Junction
  - Samples – Young MC – Know How
    Which contains:
    - Samples – The Incredible Bongo Band – Apache
    - Samples – Isaac Hayes – Theme from Shaft
  - Samples – Aqua Teen Hunger Force – Mayhem of the Mooninites
    - "Is your ego satisfied? | Damn no!"
    - "Not if you need it; and you need it."
15. "18:00 – War of Confusion" – 4:13
  - Samples – The Disposable Heroes of Hiphoprisy – Television
    Which contains:
    - Samples – Revenge trailer
      - "It was a place where everything was legal"
    - Samples – Frasier
      - "If you're looking for emotional satisfaction, my advice to you is seek professional help."
  - Samples – BBC News theme
  - Samples – Peter Gabriel – Games Without Frontiers
  - Samples – Peter Gabriel – Sledgehammer
  - Samples – Stevie Wonder – Superstition
  - Samples – Genesis – Land of Confusion
  - Samples – Edwin Starr – War
  - Samples – George W Bush's 2006 State of the Union
    - "The best way to break this addiction is through technology."
16. "19:00 – Careless Or Dead" – 5:51
  - Samples – Top of the Pops
  - Samples – Amerie – 1 Thing
  - Samples – George Michael – Careless Whisper
  - Samples – Bon Jovi – Wanted Dead or Alive
  - Samples – Krusty from The Simpsons
    - "Sorry about this, kids. Stay tuned, we got some real good commercials coming right up! I swear. Heh heh heh... ehh."
  - Samples – Waking Life
    - "Hey. You a dreamer?" "Yeah." "Haven't seen too many of you around lately. Things have been tough lately for dreamers. They say dreaming's dead: no one does it anymore. It's not dead, it's just that it's been forgotten. Removed from our language. Nobody teaches it, so nobody knows it exists. Dreamers are banished to obscurity. I'm trying to change all that, and I hope you are too. By dreaming, everyday. Dreaming with our hands and dreaming with our minds. Our planet is facing the greatest problems it's ever faced, ever. So whatever you do, don't be bored. This is absolutely the most exciting time we could have possibly hoped to be alive. Things have just started." "Hey, thanks." "Not a problem!"
17. "21:00 – Uptight Jet" – 4:01
  - Samples – The Kleptones – Bite
  - Samples – The Kleptones – Really Rappin' Something
  - Samples – Frank Sinatra and Dean Martin from The Rat Pack Live At The Sands
    - "Let's have a drink!" "You are drinking." "Oh, is that my hand?"
  - Samples – Stevie Wonder – Uptight (Everything's Alright)
  - Samples – Jet – Get What You Need
18. "22:00 – The Underground Hand That Buttoned The Widow" – 5:37
  - Samples – Circuit Boy (featuring Alan T.) – The Door
    - "You, to the left: can you move? Marcello, please assist me in rounding up the cattle. Not you, perhaps you, and never you...yes, you, with the large hairdo. Yes, fierceness is always welcome. These are role models."
  - Samples – Billy Elliot
    - "What does it feel like when you're dancing?" "Don't know. Sorta feels good. Sorta stiff and that, but once I get going... then I, like, forget everything. And... sorta disappear. Like I feel a change in my whole body. And I've got this fire in my body. I'm just there."
  - Samples – David Byrne interview
    - "Because music is very physical. Enough in the body understands it before the head. You understand what I'm trying to say?"
  - Samples – Primal Scream – Get Your Rocks Off
  - Samples – Aerosmith – Dude (Looks Like a Lady)
  - Samples – Nine Inch Nails – The Hand that Feeds
  - Samples – White Stripes – The Hardest Button to Button
  - Samples – Tori Amos – Professional Widow
  - Samples – Mirwais – Miss You
  - Samples – Radio 4 – Dance to the Underground
19. "22:45 – Babua Number One" – 3:44
  - Samples – Goldfrapp – Number 1
  - Samples – Future Sound of London – Papua New Guinea
  - Samples – Meat Beat Manifesto – Radio Babylon
20. "23:30 – Get it on the Long Hard Road" – 4:29
  - Samples – Future Sound of London – Papua New Guinea
  - Samples – Marilyn Manson (Featuring Sneaker Pimps) – Long Hard Road Out of Hell
  - Samples – T. Rex – Bang a Gong (Get It On)
21. "00:20 – Need You This Way" – 4:13
  - Samples – Jarvis Cocker
    - "Everybody wants to be sexy..."
  - Samples – Waking Life
    - "What's your name? | So, What about you? | What you doing? | Um, I'm just trying to get a sense of where I am and what's going on."
  - Samples – Kate Bush – Running Up that Hill
  - Samples – Aerosmith – Walk This Way
  - Samples – Run-D.M.C. – Walk This Way
  - Samples – INXS – Need You Tonight
  - Samples – Tom Waits – What's He Building?
22. "01:00 – What's The Matter With Your Lines, Baby?" – 2:56
  - Samples – Fear and Loathing in Las Vegas
    - "Very soon we would both be completely twisted, but there was no going back."
  - Samples – Marvin Gaye & Mary Wells – What's the Matter With You Baby
  - Samples – Duran Duran – White Lines
  - Samples – Dr. Dre (Featuring Snoop Dogg) – Still D.R.E.
    - "Still doin' that shit, huh? Oh for sure."
  - Samples – Hitchhiker's Guide to the Galaxy (BBC Radio Drama)
    - "Aahhhhhh"
  - Samples – Willy Wonka & the Chocolate Factory
    - "Do you love it too, Charlie? Oh yes, I think it's the most wonderful 'Charlie' in the whole world."
23. "01:30 – Psyche Haze" – 2:59
  - Samples – The Rocky Horror Picture Show
    - "I see you shiver with antici–pation."
  - Samples – Jimi Hendrix – Purple Haze
  - Samples – Pierre Henry – Psyché Rock
24. "02:05 – Drunk Machine" – 5:58
  - Samples – The Jackson 5 – Dancing Machine
  - Samples – Pierre Henry – Psyché Rock (William Orbit Invisible Mix)
  - Samples – Tha Alkaholiks – Only When I'm Drunk
  - Samples – Pink Floyd – The Dark Side of the Moon
    - "There's no dark side of the moon, really – matter of fact, it's all dark. The only thing that makes it look light is the sun."
  - Samples – Pixies – La La Love You
  - Samples – Bob Dylan
    - "...sell my animal ... bathe my bird ... collect my clip and buy my bath ... return me back to the cigarette"
  - Samples – Simon & Garfunkel – Punky's Dilemma
  - Samples – The Breakfast Club
    - "WOAH SHIT! Jesus Christ almighty!" | "Go to hell!"
  - Samples – Kahlil Gibran – The Prophet
  - Samples – "Daisy Bell" — excerpt from synthesized speech created by John Larry Kelly Jr at Bell Labs in 1962 using an IBM 704 computer
25. "02:45 – If Not for the Ambulance Driver" – 5:07
  - Samples – Danger: Diabolik
    - "Relax. We've got him in a box! He's too far gone on the girl. | Is she very beautiful? | Yes!"
  - Samples – The Flaming Lips – Mr. Ambulance Driver
  - Samples – George Harrison – If Not For You
  - Samples – T. Rex – Life's a Gas
  - Samples – Godley & Creme – Consequences
    - "I wonder if there is an afterlife. I've given it a great deal of thought, read a fair share of learned tomes, but have yet to come down on one side or the other."
  - Samples – Harold and Maude
    - "A lot of people enjoy being dead. But they're not dead, really. They're just backing away from life."
  - Samples – "Accident and Emergency" (Sound No. 7 from Soundgrabs:::The Phone)
  - Samples – Waking Life
    - "I'm starting to think that I'm dead. | Doesn't it make sense that death too would be wrapped in dream? That after death, your conscious life would continue in what might be called a dream body? It would be the same dream body you experience in your everyday dream life. Except that in the post-mortal state, you could never again wake up."
26. "03:15 – Imagine the End of the World" – 4:04
  - Samples – John Lennon – Imagine
  - Samples – Super Furry Animals – It's Not the End of the World?
  - Samples – Seven
    - "The world is a fine place, and worth fighting for. | I agree with the second part."
  - Samples – Flash Gordon
    - "Good morning! Are you injured? | The Lord knows why, but it seems not. | A Miracle. I expect you'd like to use my phone. | Thanks, I would. | Well it's right in there."
  - Samples – The Breakfast Club
    - "What's the matter with you? Come on!" | "What are you babbling about?" | "[...] the world's an imperfect place [...]"
  - Samples – Animal House
    - "What? Over? Did you say over?"
27. "03:40 – Crazy Tonight = Strong Teeth" – 7:06
  - Samples – Animal House
    - "Nothing is over until we decide it is!"
  - Samples – Beyoncé Knowles – Crazy in Love
  - Samples – Genesis – Tonight, Tonight, Tonight
  - Samples – Beastie Boys – Jimmy James
  - Samples – Quincy Jones – Soul Bossa Nova
  - Samples – Dire Straits – The Man's Too Strong
  - Samples – Nine Inch Nails – With Teeth
28. "04:15 – Oops Speak Louder Than Words" – 4:02
  - Samples – The Breakfast Club
    - "It's kind of a double edged sword, isn't it? | "Obscene finger gestures from such a pristine girl" | "You want to but you can't and when you do you wish you didn't, right?" | "You're just feeling sorry for yourself..."
  - Samples – Bright Eyes – At The Bottom Of Everything
  - Samples – Britney Spears
    - "It's just me. And I need to do what I feel like doing. So let me go. And just listen."
  - Samples – Tweet & Missy Elliott – Oops (Oh My)
  - Samples – Chocolate Milk – Actions Speak Louder Than Words
29. "04:40 – Amazing Temptation" – 4:41
  - Samples – Purple Rain
    - "I'm going to be totally honest with you. I think you've been full of shit."
  - Samples – Bright Eyes – At The Bottom Of Everything
  - Samples – The Breakfast Club
    - "It was an accident. | You're an asshole. | Let's end the suspense! | You did that on purpose just to fuck me over! | You're pretty sexy when you get angry."
  - Samples – Pixies – Hey
  - Samples – The Rolling Stones – Let's Spend the Night Together
  - Samples – Queen – Now I'm Here
  - Samples – Kill Bill
    - "You and I have unfinished business."
  - Samples – The Temptations – Get Ready
  - Samples – Madonna – Amazing
  - Samples – Cornelius – Smoke
30. "05:10 – If Les Fleur Were Mine" – 4:05
  - Samples – Waking Life
    - "I...you know I can't really remember right now, I can't really recall that, but that's beside the point. | You wanna do it?"
  - Samples – Luther Vandross – If This World Were Mine
  - Samples – 4Hero – Les Fleur
  - Samples – Marvin Gaye – If This World Were Mine
31. "05:35 – Anything New" – 4:22
  - Samples – Diana Ross & The Supremes and The Temptations – I'll Try Something New
  - Samples – Spiritualized – Anything More
32. "06:10 – We All Fall Through The Air" – 3:40
  - Samples – Elton John – We All Fall In Love Sometimes
  - Samples – Air – J'ai Dormi Sous L'Eau
  - Samples – Waking Life
    - "There's only one instant, and it's right now, and it's eternity. | To say yes to one instant is to say yes to all of existence."
33. "07:00 – Still Ending" – 3:13
  - Samples – Foo Fighters – Still
