= Shine On (Degrees of Motion song) =

1992 song by Degrees of Motion

Single by Degrees of Motion featuring Biti with Kit West

from the album Degrees of Motion
- Released: July 6, 1992
- Studio: Cove City Sound
- Genre: House; garage
- Length: 4:01
- Label: Esquire; FFRR
- Songwriters: Stephanie Lewis; Mike Mangini; Shane Faber; Ann Curless
- Producer: Richie Jones

Degrees of Motion singles chronology
"Do You Want It Right Now" (1992)	"Shine On" (1992)	"Soul Freedom (Free Your Soul)" (1992)

Music video
- "Shine On" on YouTube

"Shine On" is a song by American house music project Degrees of Motion, featuring vocals by Biti Strauchn and Kit West. It was originally released in July 1992 by Esquire and FFRR Records as a single from their album, Degrees Of Motion (1991), peaking at number 43 on the UK Singles Chart. Following a re-release in March 1994 after popular demand, it charted higher, peaking at number eight on the same listing. It also reached number one on the Music Week Dance Singles chart same year.

== Critical reception ==
Larry Flick from Billboard magazine described the song as "a rousing, gospel-flavored pop/houser. Anthemic chorus is empowered by Biti's inspiring lead vocal and a rush of choral chants. Fast picking up club adds, this contagious ditty is a worthy addition to pop and urban radio formats." Upon the 1994 re-release, Maria Jimenez from Music & Media praised it as "outstanding", noting that it "rides high on a positive tip charged by an up-tempo house beat." Andy Beevers from Music Week gave it a score of four out of five and complimented it as an "excellent garage song".

James Hamilton from the Record Mirror Dance Update named it a "frisky" and "striking Biti wailed snappy disco-garage canterer" in his weekly dance column. Pete Stanton from Smash Hits also praised the track, giving it four out of five. He wrote, "Little is known about Degrees of Motion. There's four of them and they've got names like ice-cream flavours — Biti, Kit, Bali and Mariposa. 'Shine On' was released last year to nil effect. And that's a crime! This is fabulous dance track sort of thing that makes your arms wave around in the air like you just don't... oh, you know the rest. Come on Mr Charts — let this record into your house."

== Track listings ==
- 12-inch, US (1992)
1. "Shine On" (club mix) — 8:25
2. "Shine On" (trance dub) — 4:05
3. "Shine On" (extended album mix) — 7:07
4. "Shine On" (Inspiration mix) — 5:00
5. "Shine On" (Bonus Chant) — 1:38
- CD single, UK and Europe (1992)
1. "Shine On" (7-inch) — 4:01
2. "Shine On" (extended LP mix) — 7:11
3. "Shine On" (Inspiration mix) — 5:02
4. "Shine On" (Junior Style dub) — 7:27
- CD single, UK and Europe (1994)
1. "Shine On" (Radiant edit) — 4:07
2. "Shine On" (Radiant remix) — 8:16
3. "Shine On" (original extended LP mix) — 7:10
4. "Shine On" (Inspiration mix) — 5:04
5. "Shine On" (Junior Style dub) — 7:25
- Remixes (2008)
1. "Shine On" (EDX Dubai Skyline Radio Edit) — 3:48
2. "Shine On" (EDX Dubai Skyline Remix) — 7:32
3. "Shine On" (EDX Dubai Skyline Dub) - 8:02
4. "Shine On" (Tristan Ingram & Jason Still Remix) - 8:45
5. "Shine On" (Smilecrusher House of Gangsters Remix) - 5:35
6. "Shine On" (7th Heaven Radio Mix) - 3:50
7. "Shine On" (7th Heaven Club Mix) - 8:02

== Charts ==
=== Weekly charts ===
Chart (1992)	Peak position
UK Singles (OCC)	43
UK Dance (Music Week)	6
UK Club Chart (Music Week)	7

Chart (1994)	Peak position
Europe (Eurochart Hot 100)	28
Europe (European Dance Radio)	14
Ireland (IRMA)	28
Israel (Israeli Singles Chart)	28
Scotland (OCC)	12
UK Singles (OCC)	8
UK Dance (Music Week)	1
UK Club Chart (Music Week)	5

=== Year-end charts ===
Chart (1992)	Position
UK Club Chart (Music Week)	100

Chart (1994)	Position
UK Singles (OCC)	97

== Release history ==
Region	Date	Format(s)	Label(s)	Ref.
United Kingdom	July 6, 1992	7-inch vinyl; 12-inch vinyl; CD; cassette	FFRR	
United Kingdom (re-release)	March 7, 1994	7-inch vinyl; 12-inch vinyl; CD; cassette	FFRR	
