= EP3 (Kleptones EP) =

EP by The Kleptones
- Released: 2006
- Recorded: Winter 2005–2006
- Genre: Bastard pop
- Length: 13:30
- Producer: The Kleptones

The Kleptones chronology
'EP2' (2006)	EP3 (2006)	'24 Hours' (2006)

EP3 is a 2006 bastard pop EP by The Kleptones. This is the last in a series of three EPs that were released in the three weeks preceding the release of the double album, 24 Hours.

The first track of this EP is included on the album, 24 Hours, although the audio clips sampled are not the same. The remaining tracks are B-sides, which are no longer obtainable on the official site of The Kleptones.

== Track listing ==
1. "01:00 - What's The Matter With Your Lines, Baby?" – 2:58
  - Samples - Marvin Gaye & Mary Wells - What's the Matter With You Baby
  - Samples - Duran Duran - White Lines
2. "I Second That Riddim" – 3:27
  - Samples - Smokey Robinson & the Miracles - I Second That Emotion
  - Samples - Chaka Demus & Pliers - Murder She Wrote
3. "Not That Town - Snoop Street" – 7:05
  - Samples - Peter Gabriel - Love Town
  - Samples - Snoop Dogg featuring Pharrell - Drop It Like It's Hot
  - Samples - Peter Gabriel - Mercy Street
