= The Kleptones =

- Origin: Brighton, England
- Genres: Experimental, mashup
- Years active: 2002–present
- Members: Eric Kleptone
- Website: Kleptones.com

The Kleptones are a one-man English electronic music act fronted by music producer and DJ Eric Kleptone. They are best known for their Internet-exclusive mashup albums. Typically, Eric Kleptone mixes rock/R&B instrumentals with rap and hip-hop vocals in a style that is "fun... and often surprising". Both his name and the group's name are parodies of the famous guitarist Eric Clapton, and a play on the fact that he is a "klepto of tones" (that is, he "steals" others' music).

== History ==
The group's first release was a mix of Yoshimi Battles the Pink Robots by The Flaming Lips with hip-hop/rap vocals and various soundbites from television programs and movies entitled Yoshimi Battles the Hip-Hop Robots.

A Night at the Hip-Hopera was the group's breakthrough and most highly acclaimed album, fusing Queen's rock music with rap vocals and many soundbites from movies and other sources. On 8 November 2004, Waxy, the main site that was mirroring A Night at the Hip-Hopera, received a cease and desist notice from the Walt Disney Company for illegal sampling of songs by Queen, similar to the banning of DJ Danger Mouse's The Grey Album.

From Detroit to J.A. was created originally for the radio program The Rinse on XFM, and was originally broadcast on 23 January 2005. Subsequently, it was released as an internet-only album, which fused R&B instrumentals with pop, rap, and R&B vocals.

In mid-2005, Eric Kleptone was awarded the Webby Award for Artist of the Year by the International Academy of Digital Arts and Sciences, who stated he had "taken the art of mash-up to a new level" and become "a global sensation".

In 2006, the group released 24 Hours, a double length album. The release of 24 Hours was preceded by three EP length releases, EP1, EP2 and EP3. Each EP was available for download for a limited time—EP2 replaced EP1, and in turn was replaced by EP3. EP3 itself was removed when 24 Hours was released.

In May 2006, the Creative Commons-licensed film project A Swarm of Angels announced the Kleptones as soundtrack producers.

In late 2006, Eric Kleptone was invited to speak at the Web 2.0 Summit in San Francisco, as half of "The Pirate and the Suit", a head-to-head discussion with EMI Music vice-chairman David Munns.

On 7 December 2006, Eric Kleptone posted a podcast, titled Hectic City on the Kleptones' blog, stating that the intention is to make it a weekly release. The podcast contains mash-ups by the Kleptones, and other artists.

In early 2008 the group released Live'r Than You'll Ever Be - Bestival 2007, a live album containing a recording of their show at Bestival, in the Isle of Wight, on Saturday 8 September 2007.

On 1 January 2010, Uptime / Downtime was released. One preview of the album, the track "Voodoo Sabotage" was released on the Kleptones blog a few weeks prior to release. Later that year, on 9 August 2010, a collection of B-sides and tracks that didn't make it onto an album, Shits & Giggles was released.

On 28 January 2018 a new EP, "COUNT-IN (1234)" was released. On 25 April 2018, The Kleptones announced via their mailing list that a new album would be released later in the year and preceded by four mixtapes. On 18 October 2018, the first of these albums, OV, was released through their mailing list after an experimental release, in which random subscribers received tracks from the album and were asked to compile the album together, was unsuccessful. The second part, LO, was released through the mailing list on 11 February 2019, after a similar experimental release. The third part, ER, was released 18 February 2020; the experimental release system was bypassed and the final album was sent directly to subscribers. The final part, AD, making the entire project come together as "OVERLOAD", was released 13 July 2021; the entire project adding up to over 8 hours.

Starting on 22 March 2020, The Kleptones started releasing a series of "Lockdown Radio" mixes.

== Discography ==
=== Albums ===
==== Remix albums ====
List of albums
Title	Album details
Yoshimi Battles the Hip-Hop Robots	Released: March 2003; Format: Digital download
A Night at the Hip Hopera	Released: 2004; Format: Digital download
From Detroit to J.A.	Released: 2005; Format: Digital download
24 Hours	Released: March 2006; Format: Digital download
Uptime / Downtime	Released: 1 January 2010; Format: Digital download
Shits & Giggles	Released: 9 August 2010; Format: Digital download
OV	Released: 18 October 2018; Format: Digital download
LO	Released: 11 February 2019; Format: Digital download
ER	Released: 18 February 2020; Format: Digital download
AD	Released: 13 July 2021; Format: Digital download
Shirts & Gurgles	Released: 1 January 2025; Format: Digital download

==== Live albums ====
List of albums
Title	Album details
Live'r Than You'll Ever Be - Bestival 2007	Released: December 2007; Format: Digital download

==== Extended plays ====
List of extended plays
Title	Album details
Never Trust Originality	Released: 2003; Format: Digital download
EP1	Released: 2006; Format: Digital download
EP2	Released: 2006; Format: Digital download
EP3	Released: 2006; Format: Digital download
COUNT-IN (1234)	Released: 2018; Format: Digital download

=== Singles ===
List of singles, showing year released and album name
Title	Year	Album
"Madonna Is a Breeder"/"Material Cannon"	2002	Non-album singles
"Bling Crosby"	2003	Non-album singles
"Bo Rhap"	2004	Non-album singles
"Careless or Dead" (Bootie version)	2006	24 Hours
"Jump You Fucker"	2010	Non-album single

=== Mixtapes ===
List of mixtapes
Title	Mixtape details
HC01 - Funk Hop & Electro Rock	Released: 2006; Format: Digital download
HC02 - A String Quartet Tribute To The Kleptones	Released: 2006; Format: Digital download
HC03a - Best Of 2006 Part 1 "Hip-Hop Started In Ipswich"	Released: 2006; Format: Digital download
HC03b - Best Of 2006 Part 2 "Sounds For The Festive Vortex"	Released: 2006; Format: Digital download
HC03c - Best Of 2006 Part 3 "If There's A Glitch, You're An Ostrich"	Released: 2006; Format: Digital download
HC04 - Live At Wired Magazine Second Life Office Launch Party	Released: 2018; Format: Digital download
HC05 - Live At Glastonbury 2010	Released: 2018; Format: Digital download
HC06 - Leaving Here	Released: 2007; Format: Digital download
HC07 - May Daze	Released: 2008; Format: Digital download
HC08a - Best Of 2008 part 1 "Songs For Magic Feet"	Released: 2008; Format: Digital download
HC08b - Best Of 2008 part 2 "We have the machine ready fi dem"	Released: 2009; Format: Digital download
HC08c - Best Of 2008 part 3 "La Blouse Piscine"	Released: 2009; Format: Digital download
HC08d - Best Of 2008 part 4 "My boss has the imagination of a gnat"	Released: 2009; Format: Digital download
HC08e - Best Of 2008 part 5 "Burned In A Feathering Pyre"	Released: 2009; Format: Digital download
HC09 - Rough And Ready On The Plinth	Released: 2009; Format: Digital download
HC10 - Once Upon A Time In The Seventies	Released: 2010; Format: Digital download
HC11 - Moombahtronica	Released: 2010; Format: Digital download
HC12 - No Wrong Show	Released: 2010; Format: Digital download
HC13 - Walking Under Ladders	Released: 2012; Format: Digital download
HC14a - M3B part 1 "A Massage From The Swedish Prime Minister"	Released: 2012; Format: Digital download
HC14b - M3B part 2 "Stop That, It's Silly…"	Released: 2012; Format: Digital download
HC14c - M3B part 3 "I'm Sorry, I'm Going To Have To Shoot You"	Released: 2012; Format: Digital download
HC15 - Paths To Graceland	Released: 2012; Format: Digital download
HC16 - Lucem Diem	Released: 2016; Format: Digital download
HC17 - Tenebris Noctis	Released: 2016; Format: Digital download
HC18 - Absolute Elsewhere	Released: 2018; Format: Digital download
HC19 - Tightening Up	Released: 2018; Format: Digital download
HC20 - Azimuth Divider	Released: 2018; Format: Digital download
HC21 - Liquid Oxygen	Released: 2018; Format: Digital download
HC22 - Electromagnetic Radiation	Released: 2018; Format: Digital download
HC23 - Occipital Vapour	Released: 2018; Format: Digital download
