= Never Trust Originality =

EP by The Kleptones
- Released: 2003
- Genre: Bastard pop
- Length: 21:24
- Producer: The Kleptones

The Kleptones chronology
Never Trust Originality (2003)	Yoshimi Battles the Hip-Hop Robots (2003)

'Never Trust Originality' is a 2003 bastard pop album by The Kleptones.

The cover image is of Porter Wagoner.

== Track listing ==
1. "Their Prayer" – 1:05
2. "Maybe Another Here" – 8:32
3. "Homesick" – 6:26
4. "Potato Salad" – 5:21

== See also ==
- Bastard pop
