= Bestival 2007 =

Music festival on the Isle of Wight

- Genre: Alternative, boutique
- Dates: 7–9 September 2007
- Locations: Robin Hill, Downend, Isle of Wight, England
- Website: Official website

The Bestival 2007 was the fourth installment of the Bestival a boutique music festival at Robin Hill on the Isle of Wight. It was held between 7 and 9 September. Tickets went on general sale on Friday 2 March, around 20,000 have been admitted for general release. Tickets were officially announced as sold out on 12 May.

The Bestival 2007 won the Best Medium Sized Festival award, at the UK Festival Awards. This was the third consecutive award for the Bestival, a feat achieved by no other festival in the awards history to date.

Many of the established features were retained including the Bollywood Bar, Hidden Disco, The Farmers Market, Come Dancing Tent, Bestival 87.7FM, Solar Powered Cinema, The Inflatable Church and the Fancy dress parade. The new features for the 2007 Bestival include:

- Swim to Bestival – A charity initiative involving swimming the Solent with the assistance of Royal Navy lifeguards for protection.
- Club Dada – A cabaret/circus themed club tent
- Laughter Clubs – Inspired by the influx of laughter clubs of India.
- Night of 100 Ukes – A performance of a 100 ukulele players comprising festival goers, organised by the Dulwich Ukulele Club.

BBC Radio 1 broadcast live from the Bestival, they also had a stage present at the Bestival showcasing many talented artists.

2007 marked the launch of Bestival Radio. The station broadcast on-site over the frequency 87.7FM and kept listeners camping at the festival up-to-date on news and events over the weekend. Bestival FM was sponsored by Jokers' Masquerade

There were 14 different musical venues at the Bestival 2007, these are – Main Stage, The Big Top, The Bollywood Bar, House of Bamboo, BBC Introducing..., Hidden Disco, Club Dada, Jestival, Bandstand, Restival, Come Dancing, The Rizla Arena, Time For Tease and Loose Tea Party.

== Line up ==
There were three surprise guests appearing over the course of the weekend.

=== Main stage ===
==== Friday ====
- Chemical Brothers
- Nathan Detroit
- The Go! Team
- Rev Milo Speedwagon
- Barry Peters
- DJ Dave Grogan
- The Maccabees
- The Levellers
- Holy Goat Soundsystem
- Noisettes
- The Hat
- Adjagas
- Hugo Frusslinky

==== Saturday ====
- Beastie Boys
- Zane Lowe
- The Cuban Brothers
- Night of 100 Ukes
- Soul II Soul
- Michael Cock
- Madness
- Spank Rock
- Easy Star All-Stars
- The Bees
- Gregory Isaacs
- Billy Bragg
- Fionn Regan

==== Sunday ====
- Primal Scream
- Rob Da Bank
- Gossip
- Queens of Noise
- Ska Cubano
- Kate Nash
- MC Beardy Man
- Beastie Boys
- DJ Yoda
- Marlena Shaw
- Colin Toogood
- Kitty Daisy & Lewis
- Bat for Lashes

=== Other Stages ===
==== Friday ====
- Calvin Harris
- Tim Westwood
- Fields
- Jon Hopkins
- John Foxx
- David Guetta
- Architecture in Helsinki

==== Saturday ====
- François K
- Simian Mobile Disco
- The Rumble Strips
- Erol Alkan
- Candie Payne
- Robyn
- Annie Mac
- Daedelus
- Foals
- Kid Carpet
- Fujiya & Miyagi
- Phill Jupitus
- Ed Byrne

==== Sunday ====
- The Orb
- Dan Le Sac Vs Scroobius Pip
- Róisín Murphy
- Dub Pistols
- Remi Nicole
- Horace Andy

== Bestival Spring Launch Parties ==
These were a new concept for 2007, allowing people to experience the atmosphere of the Bestival around the country in small gigs. Details of the events are listed below -

Saturday 7 April – Komedia, Brighton
Feat. The Cuban Brothers, Sombrero Sound System and Lost & Found.

Saturday 14 April – Mayrhofen, Austria
Feat. Kitty, Daisy & Lewis, The Cuban Brothers, Louie Austen, Rob Da Bank, Dub Pistols and Sombrero Sound System.

Friday 20 April – The Bloomsbury Ballroom, London
Feat. Candie Payne, Dan Le Sac vs Scroobius Pip, Natty, Planning To Rock, Rob Da Bank, Trojan Sound System, Sombrero Sound System.

Thursday 26 April – The Lizard Lounge, Southampton
Feat. DJ Yoda and Tommy Gunn.

Saturday 28 April – Turnmills, London
Feat. Rob Da Bank, Kitty, Daisy and lewis, Dub Pistols and Rodney P.
