= Boingo =

Boingo may refer to:

- Boingo (album), a 1994 music album by Oingo Boingo
- BOI-NGO, a 1987 music album by Oingo Boingo
- Boingo Wireless, an American wireless communication services provider
