= Passion (Gat Decor song) =

Single by Gat Decor
- Released: 1992; 1996 (remix)
- Genre: House
- Length: 3:47 (7" edit); 4:24 (Naked Mix edit)
- Label: Blanco Y Negro; BMG; Buzz; Effective Records; Flying International; Logic Records; On the Beat; Tag Records
- Songwriter: Gat Decor
- Producer: Gat Decor

Gat Decor singles chronology
"Passion" (1992)	"In the Head/Barefoot in the Head" (1996)

Music video
- "Passion" on YouTube

"Passion" is a song by English electronic music group Gat Decor. It is their best-known work and was originally released in 1992 on Effective Records. The 12-inch single contained the original, instrumental version (The Naked Mix) along with Darren Emerson's remix on the B-side. This was Emerson's first remix, and also his first record label. The 1992 release was an immediate success in underground dance clubs, and eventually became a hit on the UK Singles Chart, peaking at number 29. In 1996, a new version featuring vocals by Beverley Skeete reached number six in the UK.

== Critical reception ==
Alan Jones from Music Week described "Passion" as "an uplifting house tune" in his review of the 1992 version.

== Impact and legacy ==
"Passion" is one of the first songs to be referred to as "progressive house". Nick Warren has described the single as one of the first to create a distinctive British house sound. The distinctive "piano-house" progression in its second half was played by Simon Slater who said, "The piano break was played by me and the break is actually 1 semitone up from the bass line which is unusual but it worked and was kept like it is in the track as you know it. Then I delayed the track and added delays to create the piano rhythm."

In 1996, Mixmag magazine ranked the 1992 single number 33 on their list of the "50 Most Influential Records of All Time". In addition, Mixmag (and their readers) ranked "Passion" number 22 on Mixmag's list of "100 Best Dance Singles of All Time". British DJ Tony De Vit named the song one of his favourites that year, saying, "I don't like piano tunes but the production here is 101% and I like everything about it. I wish I'd made that record. It's relentless, dancey, soulful and so well put together. It is the perfect song — and I hate piano tunes, that's how good it is. If I made this record I could stop tomorrow."

In 2020, Mixmag featured "Passion" in their list of "The Biggest Drops in Dance Music", while NME ranked it among "The 20 Best House Music Songs... Ever!", writing, "Stick on 'Passion' and you'll immediately find yourself transported to hedonistic, early '90s Ibiza, – this euphoric dance track is the sensation of a club of revellers raising their arms as the sun comes up, bottled." Same year, Tomorrowland featured it in their official list of "The Ibiza 500".

Since its original release, "Passion" has been officially and unofficially re-issued several times. Remixed by East London DJ Mervyn Victor after playing it live in the mix for several years he finally put out a few DJ only copies in 1994 on vinyl calling it "Degrees of Passion". This was a version of the 1992 seven-minute instrumental with a mixed in vocal from "Do You Want It Right Now?" by Degrees of Motion featuring Biti. The vocal used from Degrees of Motion was sung by Biti Strauchn At the time nearly every major DJ in the UK jumped on it making it a cult hit. In 1996 a four-minute version subtitled the "Do You Want It Right Now Mix", featured a new version of the "Do You Want It Right Now" vocal recorded by Beverley Skeete peaked at number six in the UK.

As of 2008, countless bootlegs have been released, consisting of remixes and other mash-ups. The track has appeared on an abundance of compilation albums and DJ-mix sets (both official and unofficial). Other producers who have mixed the song throughout the years include Junior Vasquez and DJ Chus. The track, in both its original and various bootleg forms, is still widely played in nightclubs to this day.

== Track listing ==
- 12" single, UK (1992)
1. "Passion" (Naked Mix) — 7:43
2. "Passion" (D. Emerson Mix) — 14:06
- 12", Germany (1996)
1. "Passion" (Do You Want It Right Now Mix) — 7:27
2. "Passion" (Original Mix) — 7:43
3. "Passion" (Junior Vasquez X Beat Instrumental) — 9:46
4. "Passion" (Grant Nelson Vocal Pressure Mix) — 7:54
- 12" maxi, Europe (1992)
1. "Passion (of Your Passion)" — 7:46
2. "Passion" (D. Emerson 12" Edit) — 8:15
- CD single, Germany (1992)
1. "Passion (of Your Passion)" (7" Edit) — 3:47
2. "Passion (of Your Passion)" — 7:46
3. "Passion" (D. Emerson 12" Edit) — 8:15
- CD single, UK (1992)
1. "Passion" (Naked Mix Edit) — 4:24
2. "Passion" (D. Emerson Mix Edit) — 3:28
3. "Passion" (Naked Mix) — 7:46
4. "Passion" (D. Emerson Mix) — 14:07
- CD single (CD1), UK (1996)
1. "Passion" (Do You Want It Right Now Edit) — 4:05
2. "Passion" (Original Mix) — 7:43
3. "Passion" (Mr Roy Disko Dub) — 6:23
4. "Passion" (Grant Nelson Vocal Pressure Mix) — 7:54
5. "Passion" (Junior Vasquez X Beat Mix) — 9:46
- CD single (CD2), UK (1996)
1. "Passion" (Original Radio Edit) — 4:20
2. "Passion" (Do You Want It Right Now Mix) — 7:27
3. "Passion" (Mr Roy Full On Mix) — 6:42
4. "Passion" (Junior Vasquez X Beat Instrumental) — 9:43
5. "Passion" (No Zero Mix) — 8:00
- CD maxi, Europe (1996)
1. "Passion" (Do You Want It Right Now Edit) — 4:05
2. "Passion" (Original Mix) — 7:43
3. "Passion" (Mr Roy Disko Dub) — 6:23
4. "Passion" (Grant Nelson Vocal Pressure Mix) — 7:54
5. "Passion" (Junior Vasquez X Beat Mix) — 9:46

== Charts ==
=== Weekly charts ===
Chart (1992)	Peak position
UK Singles (OCC)	29
UK Dance (Music Week)	1
UK Club Chart (Music Week)	4

Chart (1996)	Peak position
Europe (Eurochart Hot 100)	24
Ireland (IRMA)	17
Netherlands (Dutch Top 40 Tipparade)	9
Netherlands (Dutch Single Tip)	9
Scotland (OCC)	10
UK Singles (OCC)	6
UK Dance (OCC)	2
UK Airplay (Music Week)	30
UK Club Chart (Music Week)	23

=== Year-end charts ===
Chart (1992)	Position
UK Club Chart (Music Week)	32

== Certifications ==
Region	Certification	Certified units/sales
United Kingdom (BPI)	Silver	200,000^{‡}
^{‡} Sales+streaming figures based on certification alone.
