= Chocolate Milk (band) =

American funk and soul band

- Origin: New Orleans, Louisiana, United States
- Genres: Funk, R&B, Soul
- Years active: 1974–1983
- Label: RCA
- Past members: Frank Richard; Amadee Castenell; Joe Foxx; Robert Dabon; Dwight Richards; Mario Tio; Earnest Dabon

Chocolate Milk was an American funk and soul band from New Orleans, Louisiana, active in the 1970s and early 1980s.

== Biography ==
Chocolate Milk was formed in 1974 in New Orleans, Louisiana, after the emergence of the bands Kool & the Gang and Earth, Wind & Fire. The eight-piece band included Frank Richard (vocals), Amadee Castenell (saxophone), Joe Foxx (trumpet), Mario Tio (guitars), Earnest Dabon (bass), Robert Dabon (keyboards/piano) and Dwight Richards (drums/percussion). The band also worked as the studio group for songwriter and producer Allen Toussaint, following the tenure of the Meters as Toussaint's band. Chocolate Milk backed Toussaint as a live band and on his album New Orleans Jazz and Heritage Festival (1976), and also recorded with Paul McCartney. The band then signed with RCA Records.

Their first of eight albums released on RCA was Action Speaks Louder than Words, an album that included a political message. The title cut, "Action Speaks Louder Than Words" (1975), has a break beat that has been sampled numerous times in hip hop music, including "Move the Crowd" from the 1987 album Paid in Full by Eric B. & Rakim, and "Don't Let Your Mouth Write a Check Your Ass Can't Cash" (1991) by Stetsasonic.

The band became known for "Action Speaks Louder than Words", and other hit songs: "Girl Callin'" (1978), "Say Won't Cha" (1979), and "I'm Your Radio" (1980). The band was also known for their versatility in musical styles, later adding elements of disco, prevalent on their 1981 hit, "Blue Jeans" which peaked at number fifteen on the soul chart. Chocolate Milk broke up in 1983 due to the waning popularity of disco, numerous personnel changes, and changes in producers after splitting with Toussaint in 1980.

Ernest Dabon died in San Antonio, Texas on October 3, 2015, at the age of 67. Amadee Castenell died on September 26, 2024, at the age of 74.

== Discography ==
=== Studio albums ===
- Action Speaks Louder than Words (RCA, 1975)
- Chocolate Milk (RCA, 1976)
- Comin' (RCA, 1976)
- We're All in This Together (RCA, 1977)
- Milky Way (RCA, 1979)
- Hipnotism (RCA, 1980)
- Blue Jeans (RCA, 1981)
- Friction (RCA, 1982)

=== Compilation albums ===
- Ice Cold Funk: The Greatest Grooves of Chocolate Milk (Razor & Tie, 1998)
- Best of Chocolate Milk (Camden, 2002)

=== Singles ===
| Year | Song | Peak chart positions | | |
| Year | Song | US Dance | US R&B | US Pop |
|---|---|---|---|---|
| 1975 | "Action Speaks Louder than Words" | — | 15 | 69 |
| 1976 | "How About Love" | — | 79 | ― |
| 1976 | "Comin'" | — | 56 | — |
| 1978 | "Girl Callin'" | — | 14 | 103 |
| 1979 | "Say Won'tcha" | — | 39 | ― |
| 1979 | "Groove City" | — | 59 | ― |
| 1980 | "Hey Lover" | — | 40 | ― |
| 1981 | "Blue Jeans" | ― | 15 | ― |
| 1982 | "Let's Go All the Way" | ― | 41 | ― |
| 1982 | "Take It Off" | ― | 39 | ― |
| 1982 | "Who's Getting It Now" | 50 | 65 | ― |
"—" denotes releases that did not chart or were not released in that territory.
