= Big Boing =

Big Boing may refer to:

- Big Bounce, a cosmic theory
- A character in Zatch Bell!, a manga/anime series
