= From Detroit to J.A. =

Remix album by The Kleptones
- Released: 2005
- Genre: Bastard pop
- Length: 60:03
- Producer: The Kleptones

The Kleptones chronology
A Night at the Hip-Hopera (2004)	From Detroit to J.A. (2005)	EP1 (2006)

From Detroit to J.A. is The Kleptones' third album, which blends R&B instrumentals with Pop, Rap, and R&B vocals.

The mashups were initially created for The Rinse radio show (on the London station XFM). It was originally broadcast on 23 January 2005, and later released as an internet-only album.

== Track listing ==
1. "Fox Intro" – 2:07
  - Samples - 20th Century Fox, Intro Music
  - Samples - Counter-Strike
    - "Ok, let's go."
  - Samples - The Cars - Hello Again (The Cars song)
    - "Hello...Hello Again."
2. "Let's Get The Dirt" – 4:51
  - Samples - Marvin Gaye - Let's Get It On
  - Samples - Peter Gabriel - Digging in the Dirt
3. "What Is... ?" – 1:29
  - Samples - Cypress Hill - I want to get high / Hits from the Bong
4. "Keep Love Right" – 3:55
  - Samples - Marvin Gaye - Running from Love (Version 2 w/Strings)
  - Samples - Erykah Badu - On and On
5. "Topknot Tears" – 4:10
  - Samples - Cornershop - Topknot
  - Samples - Smokey Robinson and the Miracles - Baby, Baby Don't Cry
  - Sound bites - Jason Lee as Brodie Bruce in Mallrats ("Jesus Christ man there are just some things...")
  - Sound bites - Macaulay Culkin in the video for Michael Jackson's Black or White ("But Dad, this is the best part")
6. "Caught out Nightclubbing" – 4:51
  - Samples - Shaggy featuring Ricardo Ducent - It Wasn't Me
  - Samples - Smokey Robinson and the Miracles - The Tracks of My Tears
  - Samples - Kelis - Caught out There
  - Samples - Tears for Fears - Shout
7. "Jayout" – 1:21
  - Samples - Jurassic 5 - Jayou
  - Samples - Tears for Fears - Shout
8. "I Want An Affair" – 4:20
  - Samples - Marvin Gaye - I Want You
  - Samples - Mary J. Blige - Family Affair
9. "Running From Da Squeeze" – 2:18
  - Samples - Gangstarr - Tha Squeeze
  - Samples - Marvin Gaye - Mandota
10. "Waking Groove" – 0:58
  - Sound bites - Waking Life
  - Samples - MARRS - Pump Up the Volume
11. "Bowified Rebelution" – 3:38
  - Samples - Jurassic 5 - Unified Rebellion
  - Samples - David Bowie - Fame
  - Samples - Eddie Kendricks - Keep on Truckin'
  - Samples - Eric B. & Rakim - Paid in Full (Coldcut Remix)
12. "Mandota Drop" – 3:28
  - Samples - Marvin Gaye - Running from Love (Version 1)
  - Samples - Snoop Dogg featuring Pharrell - Drop It Like It's Hot
13. "Words Of Wisdom" – 0:22
  - Sound bites - Ol' Dirty Bastard
14. "Juxtaposed With Riddim" – 2:53
  - Samples - Super Furry Animals - Juxtaposed With U
  - Samples - Seeed - Shake Baby Shake
15. "Interview 1" – 0:23
  - Samples - Monty Python's Flying Circus - Fish Licence sketch
    - "Take it away Eric the orchestra leader."
16. "Close To My Girl" – 3:18
  - Samples - The Temptations - My Girl
  - Samples - T.O.K - Shining Star (The beat of Shining Star is essentially the same as The Cure's Close to Me.)
17. "Interview 2" – 1:20
  - Sound bites - Jason Mewes as Jay - ("OK Lunchbox, let's try this again")
18. "Dancin' Papa" – 5:39
  - Samples - The Temptations - Papa Was a Rolling Stone
  - Samples - David Bowie - Let's Dance
  - Samples - Run–D.M.C.
19. "Really Rappin' Something" – 2:50
  - Samples - Velvelettes - Really Saying Something
  - Samples - Chicks on Speed - Wordy Rappinghood
20. "Revolverlution" – 5:41
  - Samples - Michael Jackson - Ben
  - Samples - Smoove - The Revolution Will Be Televised
  - Sound bites - Keanu Reeves as Neo in The Matrix
