= Boing! (song) =

"Boing!" was a single of the new album "3 : Fresh - Fri - Fly" of the Danish Hip-Hop band, Nik & Jay. It reached #1 in the Danish Club and the Danish charts.
