= A Night at the Hip Hopera =

Remix album by The Kleptones
- Released: 2004
- Genre: Bastard pop
- Length: 78:18
- Producer: The Kleptones

The Kleptones chronology
Yoshimi Battles the Hip-Hop Robots (2003)	A Night at the Hip Hopera (2004)	From Detroit to J.A. (2005)

A Night at the Hip Hopera is the third album by The Kleptones. It fused Queen's rock music with rap vocals and many sound bites from movies (such as Ferris Bueller's Day Off) and other sources. Unlike 1992's cancelled BASIC Queen Bootlegs album and despite its title, it is considered a bastard pop album rather than a hip-hop album.

On 8 November 2004 Waxy, the main site that hosted A Night At The Hip Hopera, received a cease & desist notice from the Walt Disney Company (Hollywood Records) for illegal sampling of songs by Queen, similar to the banning of DJ Danger Mouse's The Grey Album.

The album was remastered and re-released 20 years later.

== Track listing ==
1. "Precession" – 2:06
  - Samples – Queen, "Procession"
  - Samples – Queen, Queen: The eYe soundtrack
  - Sound bites – Sigue Sigue Sputnik, "She's My Man"
  - Sound bites – Flash Gordon
  - Sound bites – The Dramatics, "Introduction"
  - Sound bites – GG Allin, "Intro (M. Board)"
  - Sound bites – Kosmo Vinyl, introducing The Clash (Kingston Advice: Live in Jamaica 1982 bootleg)
  - Sound bites – Frankie Goes to Hollywood, "One February Friday"
2. "See" – 4:14
  - Samples – Queen, "One Vision"
  - Samples – Queen, Queen: The eYe soundtrack
  - Samples – Quentin Harris, "Let's Be Young"
  - Samples – KRS-One, "Hip Hop vs. Rap"
  - Samples – Grandmaster Flash & the Furious Five, "The Message"
  - Samples – Kelis, "Milkshake"
  - Sound bites – Aqua Teen Hunger Force (episode: "Revenge of the Mooninites")
  - Sound bites – Ferris Bueller's Day Off
  - Sound bites – Lil Jon and the Eastside Boyz, "Luke Talkin Shit"
  - Sound bites – Ludacris
  - Sound bites – JAM Creative Productions jingles
  - Sound bites – World News Tonight (9 March 2004 broadcast)
3. "Live" – 3:10
  - Samples – Queen, "Keep Yourself Alive"
  - Samples – Afrika Bambaataa & Family, "Got to Get Up/Just Get Up and Dance"
  - Sound bites – Calvert DeForest, Run-D.M.C. music video – "King of Rock"
4. "Bite" – 4:02
  - Samples – Queen, "Another One Bites the Dust"
  - Samples – Justin Timberlake featuring Clipse, "Like I Love You"
  - Samples – Ol' Dirty Bastard featuring Kelis, "Got Your Money"
  - Samples – Missy Elliott, "Pass That Dutch"
  - Sound bites – Disco Fever infomercial
  - Sound bites – Fear, "I Don't Care About You" (live, as featured in The Decline of Western Civilization)
  - Sound bites – TV Offal ("Honest Obituary" segment)
5. "Jazz" – 4:48
  - Samples – Queen, "More of That Jazz"
  - Samples – Queen, "We Will Rock You"
  - Samples – Task Force, "Tears on My Pillowcase"
  - Sound bites – 5 Headed Retard
  - Sound bites – Jane's Addiction bootleg
  - Sound bites – Timothy Leary
6. "Rock" – 2:45
  - Samples – Queen, "We Will Rock You"
  - Samples – Peaches, "Rock Show"
  - Samples – Killa Kela, "Heavy Artillery"
  - Sound bites – Jane's Addiction bootleg
7. "Love" – 0:31
  - Samples – Queen, "Tenement Funster"
  - Sound bites – Brian May interview
8. "Fight" – 3:20
  - Samples – Queen, "Fight from the Inside"
  - Samples – Dilated Peoples, "Marathon"
9. "Fuck" – 1:09
  - Samples – Queen, "Seven Seas of Rhye"
  - Samples – Queen, "Keep Yourself Alive"
  - Sound bites – PAMS jingles
  - Sound bites – Stereophile test CD
  - Sound bites – Pink Noise at -20dB
10. "Play" – 3:41
  - Samples – Queen, "Play the Game"
  - Samples – De La Soul, "Much More"
  - Samples – Electric Six, "Gay Bar"
  - Samples – Meat Loaf, "You Took the Words Right Out of My Mouth"
  - Sound bites – 50 Cent
11. "Ride" – 3:10
  - Samples – Queen, "Bicycle Race"
  - Samples – Eminem, "My Name Is"
  - Sound bites – 5 Headed Retard
  - Sound bites – Black Chiney
  - Sound bites – Ferris Bueller's Day Off
  - Sound bites – Britney Spears
12. "Sniff" – 4:20
  - Samples – Queen and David Bowie, "Under Pressure"
  - Samples – Belinda Carlisle, "Heaven Is a Place on Earth"
  - Samples – Vanilla Ice, "Ice Ice Baby"
  - Samples – Prince Paul featuring De La Soul, "More Than U Know"
  - Samples – Adam Freeland, "We Want Your Soul"
  - Sound bites – The Lox, "Brains...Take One (Skit)"
  - Sound bites – Lil Jon and the Eastside Boyz, "Weedman (Skit)"
13. "Ridicule" – 0:36
  - Samples – Queen, "Queen Talks"
14. "Plan" – 4:49
  - Samples – Queen, "I'm Going Slightly Mad"
  - Samples – Herbaliser featuring Latyrx, "8-Point Agenda"
15. "Break" – 3:11
  - Sound bites – Ferris Bueller's Day Off
  - Samples – Queen, "I Want to Break Free"
  - Samples – Aaliyah featuring Timbaland, "Try Again"
  - Samples – Beastie Boys, "Shake Your Rump"
  - Samples – Beastie Boys, "Body Movin'"
  - Samples – Beastie Boys, "Alive"
16. "Listen" – 3:59
  - Samples – Queen, "Radio Ga Ga"
  - Samples – Beastie Boys, "Shake Your Rump"
  - Samples – Beastie Boys, "Intergalactic"
  - Samples – Beastie Boys, "Root Down"
  - Samples – Beastie Boys, "Sure Shot"
  - Sound bites – Hancock's Half Hour
17. "Work" – 2:21
  - Samples – Queen, "Machines (Back to Humans)"
  - Samples – Missy Elliott, "She's a Bitch"
  - Sound bites – Dilbert (episode: "The Gift")
  - Sound bites – Flavor Flav
  - Sound bites – Richard Hamming, IBM slogan "Machines should work, people should think" (From Raymond Scott's "IBM MT/ST: The Paperwork Explosion")
  - Sound bites – Star Trek: The Next Generation
18. "Come" – 4:26
  - Samples – Queen, "Spread Your Wings"
  - Samples – Common featuring Erykah Badu and Q-Tip, "Come Close"
19. "Expose" – 3:15
  - Samples – Queen, "Flash"
  - Samples – Brandy and Monica, "The Boy Is Mine"
  - Samples – Beats International, "Dub Be Good to Me"
  - Samples – Jethro Tull, "The Third Hoorah"
  - Samples – Randall Jones, "Up Out of Here"
20. "Jerk" – 5:04
  - Samples – Queen, "A Kind of Magic"
  - Samples – Morris Day and The Time, "Jerk Out"
  - Samples – Detroit Grand Pubahs, "Sandwiches"
  - Sound bites – 5 Headed Retard
  - Sound bites – Ferris Bueller's Day Off
  - Sound bites – Keith Murray
  - Sound bites – The Kinks interview (as featured on BBC Sessions 1964-1977)
  - Sound bites – Neon Genesis Evangelion (English dub)
21. "Save" – 4:13
  - Samples – Queen, "Save Me"
  - Samples – DJ Vadim featuring Atmosphere, "Edie Brickell"
  - Sound bites – Keith Murray
22. "Stop" – 3:28
  - Samples – Queen, "Don't Stop Me Now"
  - Samples – Looptroop featuring Chords and Timbuktu, "Heads Day Off"
  - Sound bites – Keith Murray
  - Sound bites – Erick Sermon
  - Sound bites – Kanye West, "Lil Jimmy Skit"
23. "Question" – 5:28
  - Samples – Queen, "Who Wants to Live Forever"
  - Sound bites – Alfasound jingle
  - Sound bites – Aqua Teen Hunger Force (episode: "Revenge of the Mooninites")
  - Sound bites – The Big Lebowski
  - Sound bites – Blade Runner
  - Sound bites – The Decline of Western Civilization
  - Sound bites – Fight Club
  - Sound bites – Head
  - Sound bites – Hugh Hefner interview
  - Sound bites – JAM Creative Productions jingle
  - Sound bites – Neon Genesis Evangelion
  - Sound bites – World News Tonight (9 March 2004 broadcast)

== Related track ==
- "Bo Rhap" – 6:50
  - Although not part of the A Night At The Hip Hopera album, this unique track mashes up multiple versions of Queen's legendary song, Bohemian Rhapsody. It was released as a Christmas 2004 single (after the album), and since Bohemian Rhapsody was not among the songs sampled by the Kleptones for the album, it's possible that "Bo Rhap" was meant to be part of it, or at the very least a bonus track.
- "Kill" & "Smash"
  - While neither are on the album, they are included on the unreleased tracks compilation Shits & Giggles.

== See also ==
- Bastard pop
