= Gat Decor =

English electronic music group

- Origin: Hammersmith, London, England
- Genres: Progressive house, electronic
- Years active: 1992–1997
- Members: Simon Slater; Laurence Nelson-Boudville; Simon Hanson
- Website: www.gatdecor.com

Gat Decor (or Gat Décor) were an English electronic music group popular with the 1992 song "Passion". The song is considered to be one of the best-known works of the early progressive house genre.

The main contributors of the team are the British DJs and producers, Simon Slater, Laurence Nelson-Boudville and Simon Hanson. The name 'Gat Decor' was derived from an anagram of 'Tag Records', a record store based in Soho, London.

Although Gat Decor does not have an extensive catalog (two proper singles and a handful of remixes), the act and "Passion" are widely considered influential to electronic dance music in the early 1990s; and Slater still continues to license "Passion".

== Discography ==
=== Singles ===
- 1992 "Passion" (#29 UK)
- 1996 "Passion" (remix) (#6 UK)
- 1996 "In the Head" / "Barefoot in the Head"

=== Remixes ===
- 1992 Euphoria "Love You Right"
- 1992 The Odd Company "Swing in Trance"
- 1992 D'lusion "Take You There"
- 1993 Latitude "Building a Bridge"
- 1993 JFK "Here They Come Again"
- 1993 Country & Western "Positive Energy"
- 1994 Jean-Michel Jarre "Chronologie Part 6"
- 1994 The Good Strawberries "Eyes on a Summer Day"

== See also ==
- Phunky Phantom
