= Esquire Records =

Esquire Records was an Australian record label based in Sydney. In 1951 it acquired the Australian and New Zealand distribution rights for Discovery Records and later that year the distribution rights for Prestige Records. In 1955 Esquire acquired the Australian rights to Mercury Records. In 1962 the label closed, to re-emerge as Philips' Recording Mercury, after being taken over by Philips Records.

The label distributed Petula Clark's first singles in Australia.

== See also ==
- List of record labels
