= Change Is Coming (album) =

Studio album by Money Mark
- Released: September 18, 2001
- Length: 38:51
- Label: Emperor Norton
- Producer: Mario C.; Money Mark

Money Mark chronology
Push the Button (1998)	Change Is Coming (2001)	Brand New by Tomorrow (2007)

Professional ratings
Aggregate scores
Source	Rating
Metacritic	78/100
Review scores
Source	Rating
AllMusic	3/5 stars
Pitchfork	6.5/10
The New Rolling Stone Album Guide	3/5 stars

Change Is Coming is the fourth solo studio album by American musician Money Mark. It was released on September 18, 2001, through Emperor Norton Records. Production was handled by Money Mark himself together with Mario C.

Upon its release, the album was met with generally favourable reviews from music critics. At Metacritic, which assigns a normalized rating out of 100 to reviews from mainstream publications, Change Is Coming received an average score of 78 based on ten reviews.

== Track listing ==
No.	Title	Length
1.	"Chocochip"	2:30
2.	"Information Contraband"	3:27
3.	"Caught Without a Race"	2:58
4.	"Glitch in da System"	3:24
5.	"Another Day to Love You"	3:11
6.	"Soul Drive Sixth Avenue"	3:46
7.	"People's Party (Red Alert)"	4:00
8.	"Love Undisputed"	2:45
9.	"Doo Doo Doo"	2:30
10.	"Use Your Head"	2:49
11.	"Pepe y Irene"	3:34
12.	"Rain (NYC)"	3:57
Total length:		38:51

== Personnel ==
- "Money Mark" Ramos-Nishita – songwriter & producer, Fender Rhodes electric piano & Korg Triton synthesizer (track 1), electric guitar (tracks: 2, 7), Ring Mod guitar & Roland SH-101 synthesizer (track 2), bass (tracks: 2, 5, 12), organ (tracks: 3, 9–11), electric bass (tracks: 3, 4, 6, 7, 9, 10), drums (tracks: 3–7, 10), talk-box guitar & mbira (track 4), acoustic piano (tracks: 5, 11), Korg MS2000 synthesizer & electric tres (track 5), clavinet (track 6), flute (tracks: 6, 7), electric organ & ARP Odyssey synthesizer (track 7), percussion (track 7), Cx-3 organ & foot bass (track 8), humming & Pianet electric piano (track 9), nylon guitar (tracks: 9, 10), electric piano (track 10), vibraphone (tracks: 11, 12), cowbell (track 11), steel string guitar & synthesizer (track 12), mixing & editing (tracks: 1–9, 12), engineering & tracking (tracks: 3, 8), recording (tracks: 10, 12), concept
- Sean Lennon – electric bass (track 1)
- Peter Yanowitz – drums (tracks: 1, 2, 4), percussion programming & recording (track 12)
- John Paul "Japa" Keenon – drums (track 2)
- Alfredo Ortiz – percussion (tracks: 2–5), Korg 770 percussion synthesizer (track 5), congas (track 6), additional percussion (track 7), drums (track 9), cuíca (track 10)
- José "Crunchy" Espinoza – saxophone (track 3)
- Seth Zwerling – trumpet & flugelhorn (track 3)
- Timo Ellis – distorted guitar (track 4)
- Walter Miranda – flute synthesizer (track 4), Sequential Circuits Six-Trak (track 5), drums (track 8)
- Ulises Bella – baritone saxophone (track 6), saxophone (track 7), clarinet (track 12)
- David Hidalgo – songwriter & violin (track 11)
- Louie Pérez – songwriter & tumbao (track 11)
- Cesar Rosas – electric guitar (track 11)
- Steve Berlin – saxophone & flute (track 11)
- Conrad Lozano – bajo sexto (track 11)
- Victor Bisetti – percussion (track 11)
- Mario Caldato Jr. – songwriter & producer (tracks: 10, 11), recording (track 10), mixing & editing (tracks: 1–9, 12)
- Kazuyuki Matsumura – recording (track 1)
- Tom Schick – recording assistant (track 1)
- Robert Carranza – mixing & editing (tracks: 1–9, 12)
- Craig Silvey – tracking (tracks: 2, 4–7, 9)
- Alex Osborne – tracking assistant (tracks: 2, 4–7, 9)
- Brian "B+" Cross – photography
- Robert Bennett – management

== Charts ==
Chart (2001)	Peak position
UK Independent Albums (OCC)	29
