= Push the Button =

Push the Button may refer to:

== Music ==
- Push the Button (Money Mark album), 1998
- Push the Button (The Chemical Brothers album), 2005
- "Push the Button" (Sugababes song), 2005
- "Push the Button" (Teapacks song), 2007, Israeli Eurovision song
- "Push the Button", a song by Amy Lee from Aftermath
- "Computer Age (Push the Button)", a 1984 song by Newcleus

== Other ==
- Ant & Dec's Push the Button, a British game show
- Push the Button (video game), a 2019 video game in The Jackbox Party Pack 6
