= Dogme 95 =

Danish filmmaking movement

- Years active: 1995–2005
- Location: Denmark
- Major figures: Lars von Trier; Thomas Vinterberg; Kristian Levring; Søren Kragh-Jacobsen; Jean-Marc Barr; Harmony Korine
- Influences: Realism; French New Wave
- Influenced: Mumblecore; New Puritans; Remodernist; Philippine New Wave; Dogma 25; Ogme 43

Dogme 95 (Danish: [ˈtʌwmə]; lit. 'Dogma 95') was a Danish avant-garde filmmaking movement founded by Lars von Trier and Thomas Vinterberg, who created the "Dogme 95 Manifesto" and the "Vows of Chastity" (Danish: kyskhedsløfter). These were rules to create films based on the traditional values of story, acting, and theme, while excluding the use of elaborate special effects or technology. It was supposedly created as an attempt to "take back power for the directors as artists" as opposed to the movie studio.

Von Trier and Vinterberg were later joined by Kristian Levring and Søren Kragh-Jacobsen, forming a group known as the Dogme 95 Collective or the Dogme Brethren. French-American filmmaker Jean-Marc Barr and American filmmaker Harmony Korine are also seen as major figures in the movement. Breaking the Waves (1996), von Trier's first film under his own production company Zentropa, became the precursor of the movement.

== History ==
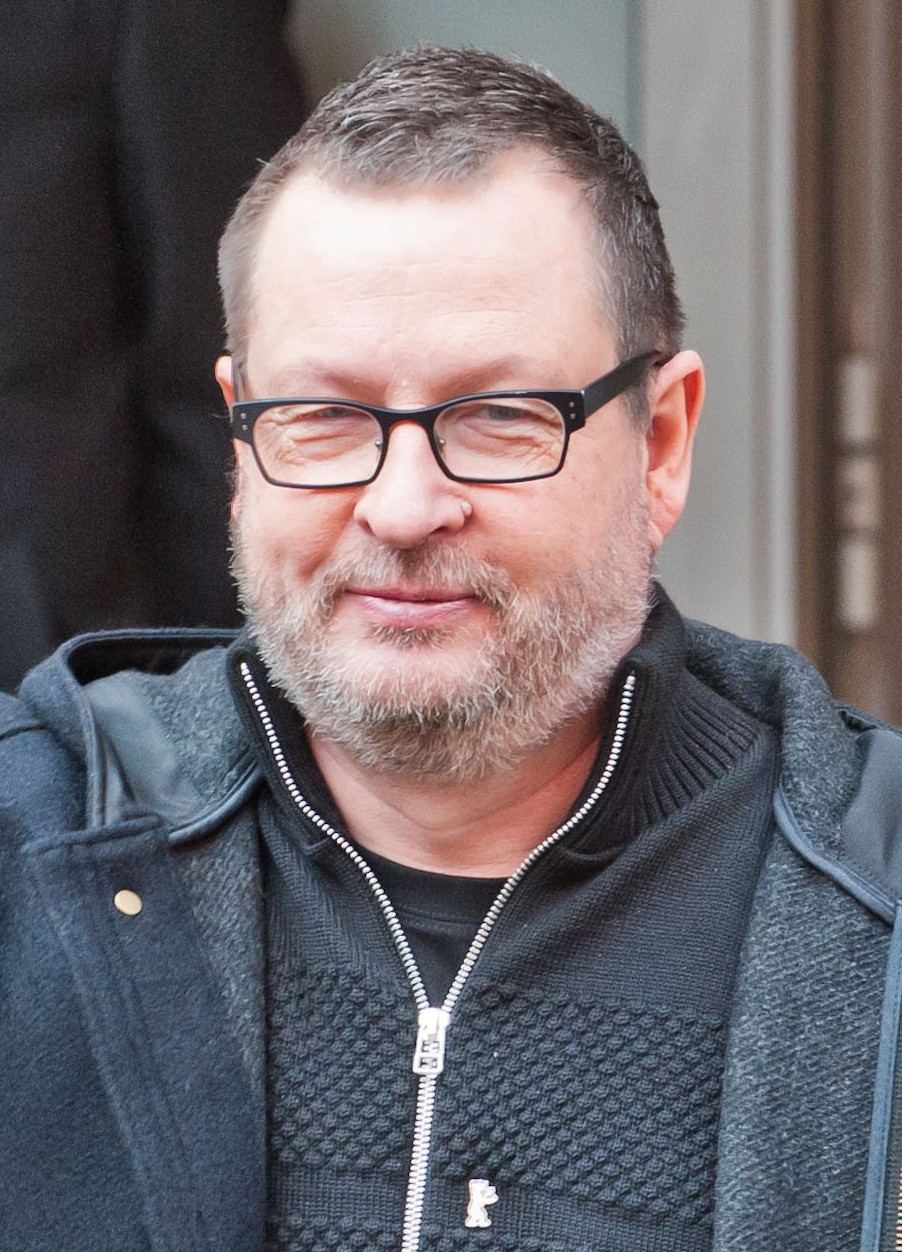
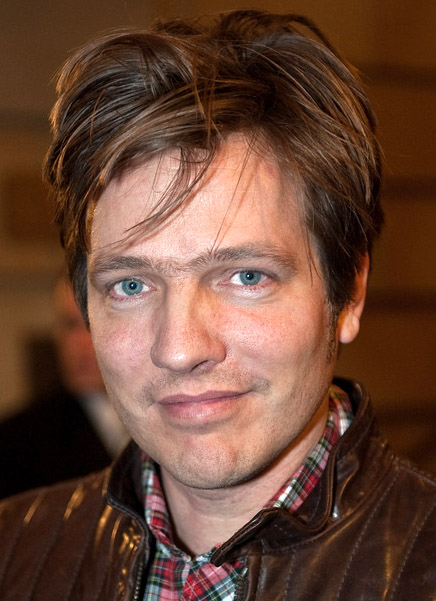
Lars von Trier (left) and Thomas Vinterberg (right), the founding "brothers" of the Dogme 95 movement

Lars von Trier and Thomas Vinterberg wrote and co-signed the manifesto and its companion "vows". Vinterberg said that they wrote the pieces in 45 minutes. The manifesto initially mimics the wording of François Truffaut's 1954 essay "Une certaine tendance du cinéma français" in Cahiers du cinéma.

In response to criticism, von Trier and Vinterberg have both stated that they just wanted to establish a new extreme: "In a business of extremely high budgets, we figured we should balance the dynamic as much as possible."

In 1996, the movement took Breaking the Waves as the main inspiration by ethos, although the film breaks many of the movement's "rules", including built sets, post-dubbed music, violence, and computer graphics in the end of the film.

Like the No Wave Cinema creative movement, Dogme 95 has been described as a defining period in low-budget film production.

Since 2002 and the 31st film, Spanish director Juan Pinzás no longer needs to have his work verified by the original board to identify it as a Dogme 95 work after finishing up his own trilogy. The founding "brothers" have begun working on new experimental projects and have been skeptical about the later common interpretation of the Manifesto as a brand or a genre. The movement broke up in 2005.

== Goals and rules ==
The goal of the Dogme collective is to "purify" filmmaking by refusing expensive and spectacular special effects, post-production modifications and other technical gimmicks. The filmmakers concentrate on the story and the actors' performances. They claim this approach may better engage the audience, as they are not "alienated or distracted by overproduction". To this end, von Trier and Vinterberg produced ten rules to which any Dogme film must conform. These rules, referred to as the "Vow of Chastity", are as follows:

I swear to submit to the following set of rules drawn up and confirmed by DOGMA 95:

1. Shooting must be done on location. Props and sets must not be brought in (if a particular prop is necessary for the story, a location must be chosen where this prop is to be found).
2. The sound must never be produced apart from the images or vice versa. (Music must not be used unless it occurs where the scene is being shot.)
3. The camera must be hand-held. Any movement or immobility attainable in the hand is permitted.
4. The film must be in colour. Special lighting is not acceptable. (If there is too little light for exposure the scene must be cut or a single lamp be attached to the camera.)
5. Optical work and filters are forbidden.
6. The film must not contain superficial action. (Murders, weapons, etc. must not occur.)
7. Temporal and geographical alienation are forbidden. (That is to say that the film takes place here and now.)
8. Genre movies are not acceptable.
9. The film format must be Academy 35 mm.
10. The director must not be credited.

Furthermore I swear as a director to refrain from personal taste! I am no longer an artist. I swear to refrain from creating a “work”, as I regard the instant as more important than the whole. My supreme goal is to force the truth out of my characters and settings. I swear to do so by all the means available and at the cost of any good taste and any aesthetic considerations.

Thus I make my VOW OF CHASTITY.

=== Firsts ===
In total, 35 films made between 1998 and 2005 are considered to be part of the movement.

- The first of the Dogme films (Dogme #1) was Vinterberg's 1998 film Festen (The Celebration), first produced in Denmark.
- Since the first four films from Denmark were released, other international directors have made films based on Dogme principles. French-American actor and director Jean-Marc Barr, von Trier's frequent collaborator, was the first non-Dane to direct a Dogme film: Lovers (1999) (Dogme #5).
- American director Harmony Korine's film Julien Donkey-Boy (Dogme #6) is also a first non-European and the first American film to be considered a Dogme.
- South Korean's La Fémis-graduate and academic Daniel H. Byun's film debut Interview (Dogme #7) is the first and only Asian film ever made under the Dogme movement.
- Argentine filmmaker José Luis Marquès' mockumentary film Fuckland (Dogme #8) is the first Latin American and the first Argentina film to follow the Dogme 95 movement minimalist guidelines.
- Trier attempted to make a Dogme trilogy, known as "Golden Heart" (consisting of Breaking the Waves (1996), The Idiots (1998; Dogme #2), and Dancer in the Dark (2000)), but only The Idiots is a certified Dogme 95 film, while Breaking the Waves and Dancer in the Dark are sometimes associated or heavily laid out with the movement. As a result, Pinzás was the only filmmaker to submit three films, making a trilogy called "Gay Galician Dogma", which comprises Once Upon Another Time (2000; Dogme #22), Wedding Days (2002; Dogme #30), and The Outcome (2005; Dogme #31).

=== Attempts ===
While Interview (2000) does not explicitly mention that it is registered as Dogme #7, the number had originally referred to a scheduled German film titled Broken Cookies, directed by another one of von Trier's frequent collaborators, Udo Kier. The film was never produced, and Interview was registered instead.

The end credits of Het Zuiden (South) (2004), directed by Martin Koolhoven, included thanks to "Dogme 95". Koolhoven originally planned to shoot it as a Dogme film, and it was co-produced by von Trier's Zentropa. Finally, the director decided he did not want to be so severely constrained as by Dogme principles.

=== Uses and abuses ===
The above rules have been both circumvented and broken from numerous films submitted as a Dogme, particularly a director's credit and background music appearing in Interview and Fuckland as for examples. Some examples include:

- Vinterberg "confessed" to having covered a window during the shooting of one scene in The Celebration (Festen). With this, he both brought a prop onto the set and used "special lighting".
- Von Trier used background music (Le Cygne by Camille Saint-Saëns) in the film The Idiots (Idioterne).
- Korine's Julien Donkey-Boy features two scenes with non-diegetic music, several shot with non-handheld, hidden cameras and a non-diegetic prop.
- Byun's Interview also contains features that violated the rules including cramming in dolly shots, moody lighting, a director's credit, and Park's background music.
- Márques' Fuckland broke some of the Dogme 95 guidelines, including the use of non-diegetic music, digital video, and a directorial credit.

=== Concepts and influences ===
Breaking the Waves, von Trier's first film after founding the Dogme 95 movement, was heavily influenced by the Dogme 95 style and ethos, even though it breaks many of the "rules" (including a directorial credit, background sets, non-diegetic music, and use of CGI).

The 2001 experimental film Hotel, directed by Mike Figgis, makes several mentions of the Dogme 95 style of filmmaking, and has been described as a "Dogme film-within-a-film".

Keyboard player and music producer Money Mark used principles inspired by Dogme 95 to record his Mark's Keyboard Repair album.

== Notable Dogme films ==
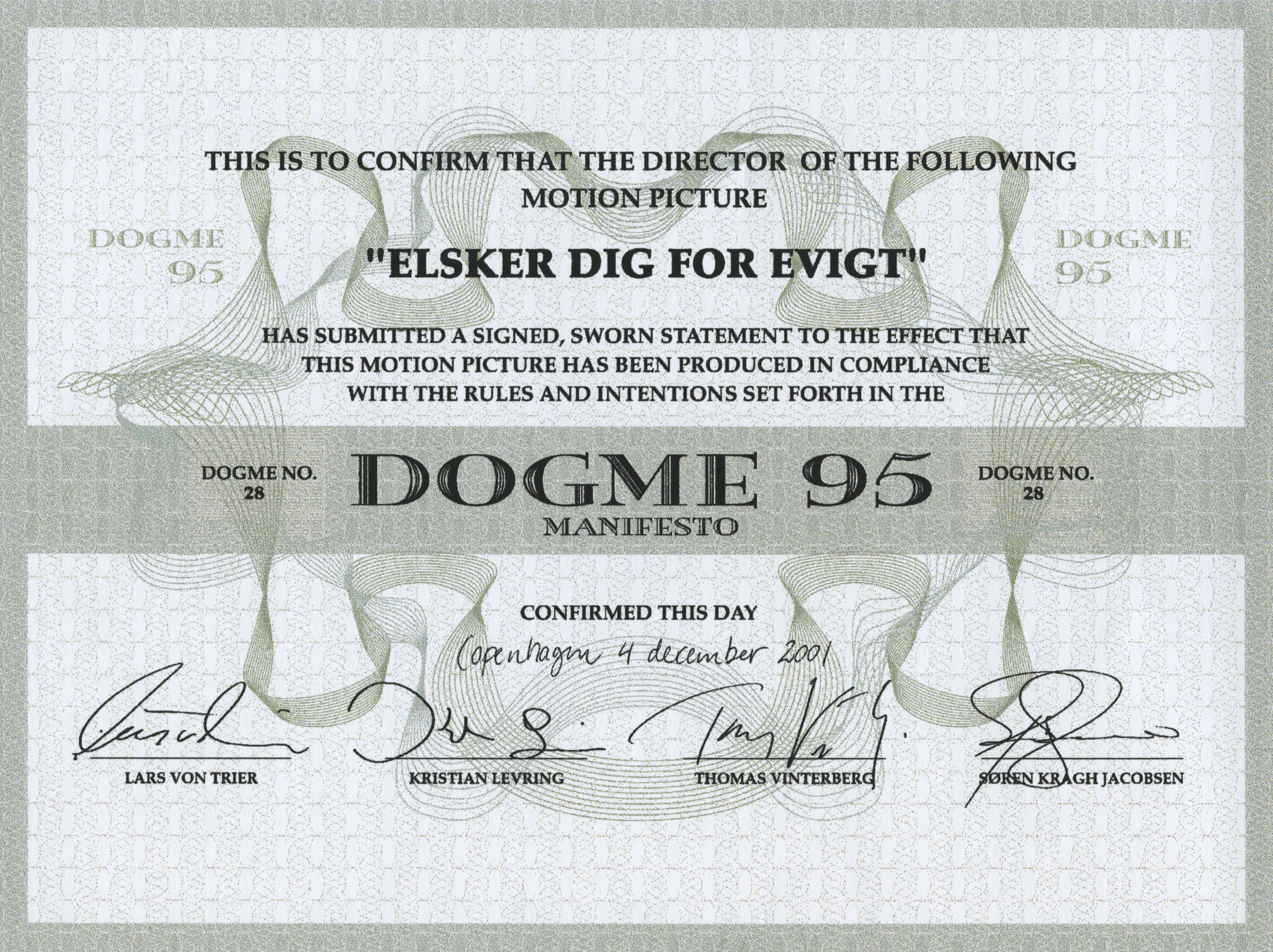
Dogme certificate for Bier's Elsker dig for evigt (Open Hearts, 2001), Dogme No. 28.

A complete list of the 35 films is available from the Dogme95 web site. Juan Pinzás (#22, #30, and #31) is the only filmmaker to have submitted more than once.

- Dogme #1: Festen
- Dogme #2: The Idiots
- Dogme #3: Mifune's Last Song
- Dogme #4: The King Is Alive
- Dogme #5: Lovers
- Dogme #6: Julien Donkey-Boy
- Dogme #7: Interview
- Dogme #8: Fuckland
- Dogme #12: Italian for Beginners
- Dogme #13: Amerikana
- Dogme #14: Joy Ride
- Dogme #15: Camera-Dogme15
- Dogme #28: Open Hearts

== Reception ==
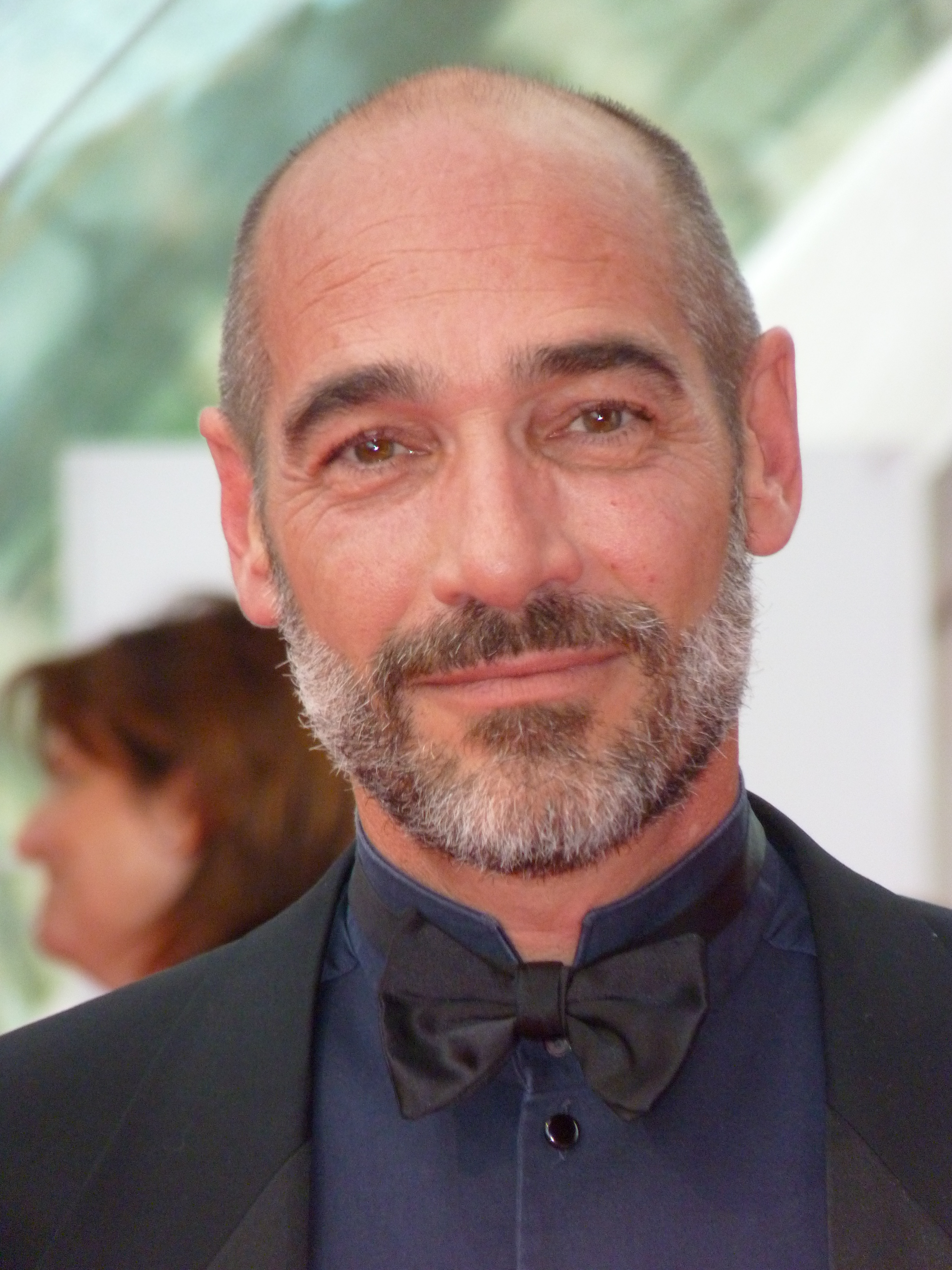
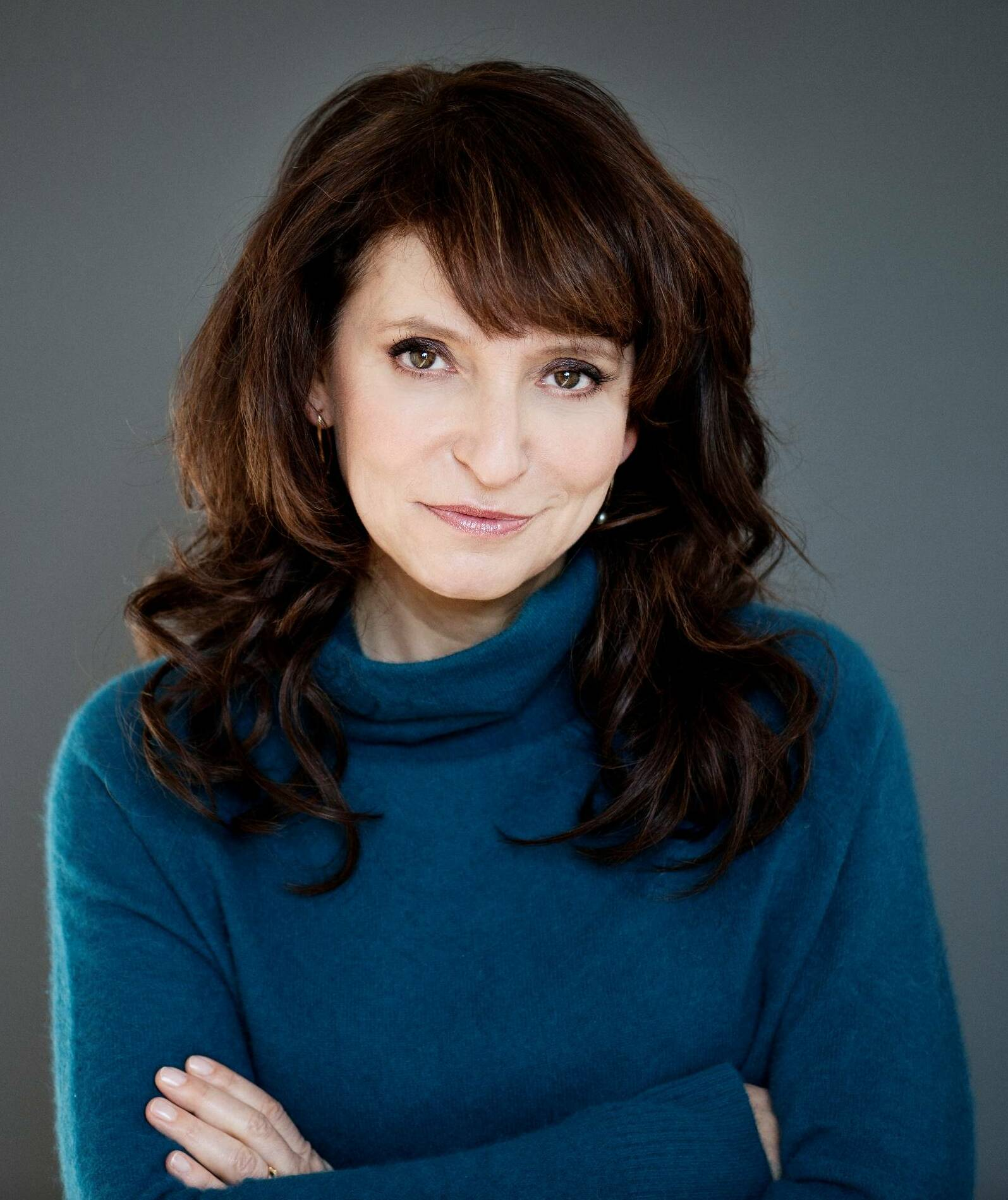
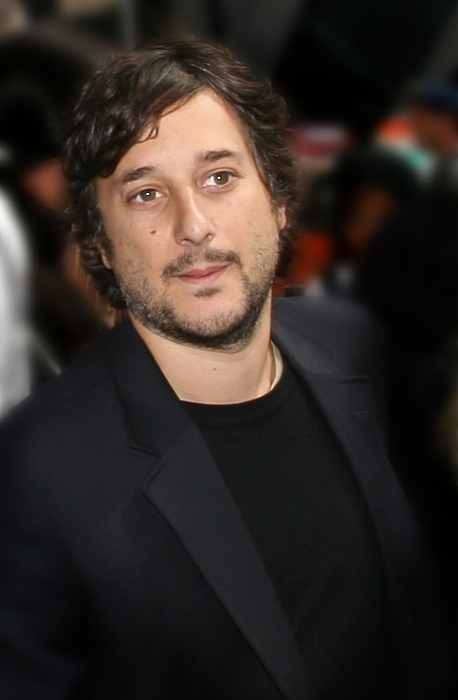
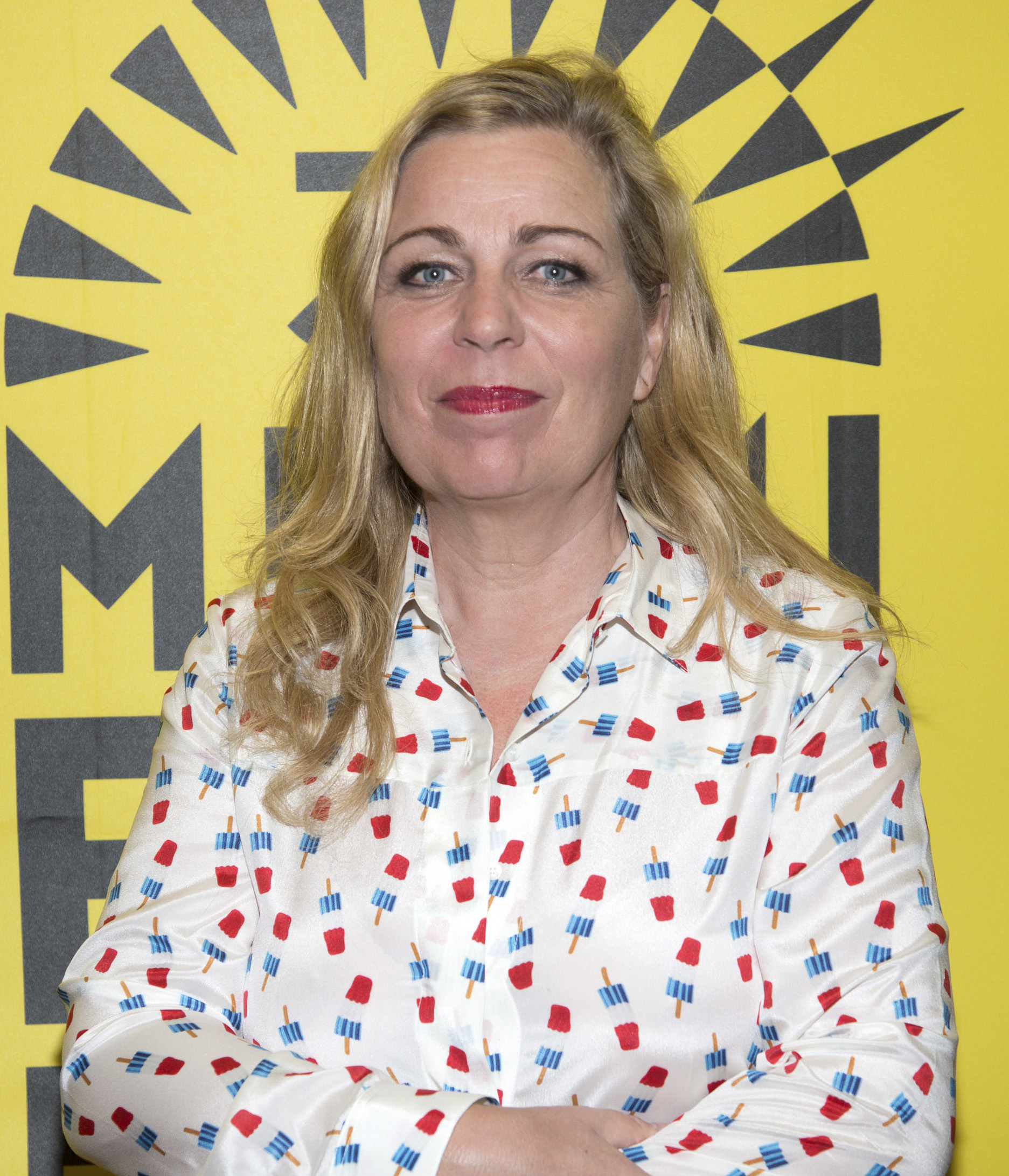
Clockwise from top left: Jean-Marc Barr, Susanne Bier, Lone Scherfig, and Harmony Korine appeared in films from the Museum of Arts and Design.

Most of the Dogme films received mixed or negative reviews. However, some were critically acclaimed; these include Vinterberg's film Festen (The Celebration), Scherfig's film Italiensk for begyndere (Italian for Beginners), and Bier's film Elsker dig for evigt (Open Hearts). Films such as Von Trier's film Idioterne (The Idiots) and Jacobsen's film Mifunes sidste sang (Mifune's Last Song), also received lukewarm reviews.

Festen won numerous awards including the Jury Prize at the Cannes Film Festival and won seven at Robert Awards in 1998. Italiensk for begyndere also won the Silver Bear Grand Jury Prize at the Berlin Film Festival in 2000.

In 2015, the Museum of Arts and Design celebrated the movement with the retrospective The Director Must Not Be Credited: 20 Years of Dogme 95. The retrospective included work by Lars von Trier, Thomas Vinterberg, Jean-Marc Barr, Susanne Bier, Daniel H. Byun, Harmony Korine, Kristian Levring, Annette K. Olesen, and Lone Scherfig.

== Notable directors and actors/actresses appearing in Dogme 95 films ==
- Miles Anderson
- David Bradley
- Søren Kragh-Jacobsen
- Lee Jung-jae
- Nicole Kidman
- Harmony Korine
- Jennifer Jason Leigh
- Mads Mikkelsen
- Anthony Dod Mantle
- Richard Martini
- Chloë Sevigny
- Paprika Steen
- Lars von Trier

== Legacy ==
Although the movement was dissolved in 2005, the filmmakers continued to develop independent and experimental films using or influenced by the concept including Jan Dunn's Gypo and Brillante Mendoza's films Serbis, Tirador, and Ma' Rosa.

The use of 'Dogme 95' style filming is in a list of a hostage taker's demands in the Black Mirror episode, "The National Anthem".

James Cairney, the director of filmography for Armando Iannucci's political satire The Thick of It—the predecessor to the HBO comedy Veep—has stated that he was instructed to try to adhere to the Dogme 95 principles as much as possible, including the use of handheld cameras and natural light.

After the release of Byun's film Interview (2000), some South Korean films who considered as an influence to Dogme 95 films, but rejected that serves as an actual Dogme; this includes This Charming Girl (2004) by Lee Yoon-Ki, Secret Sunshine (2007) by Lee Chang-dong, and The Housemaid (2010) by Im Sang-soo.

Much of Von Trier's works were influenced by the manifesto. His first film after founding the movement was Breaking the Waves, which was heavily influenced by the movement's style and ethos, although the film broke many of the "rules" laid out by the movement's manifesto, including built sets, and usage of non-diegetic musics and computer graphics. Most of his films that followed these principles can be traced from the 1998 film Idioterne until Riget: Exodus.

Vinterberg's 2012 film, Jagten, was also influenced by the manifesto.

Money Mark has stated that the album Mark's Keyboard Repair was an "experimental concept based loosely on" the Dogme 95 idea.

=== Dogma 25 ===
At the 2025 Cannes Film Festival five Danish filmmakers - May el-Toukhy, Milad Alami, Isabella Eklöf, Annika Berg and Jesper Just - announced the creation of Dogma 25, a new filmmaking manifesto inspired by Dogme 95. Vinterberg and von Trier gave the filmmakers their blessing with the new manifesto, stating: "In '95, we made films in the certainty of peace and created a revolt against conformity. In '25, new dogmas were created, now in a world of war and uncertainty. We wish you the best of luck on your march toward reconquering Danish film."

The Dogma 25 rules read:

1. The script must be original and handwritten by the director.
2. At least half the film must be without dialogue.
3. The internet is off limits in all creative processes.
4. We’ll only accept funding with no content-altering conditions attached.
5. No more than 10 people behind the camera.
6. The film must be shot where the narrative takes place.
7. We’re not allowed to use make-up or manipulate faces and bodies unless it’s part of the narrative.
8. Everything relating to the film’s production must be rented, borrowed, found or used.
9. The film must be made in no more than one year.
10. Create the film as if it were your last.

== See also ==
- Extreme cinema
- Minimalism
- Realism (arts)
- Pluginmanifesto
- New Puritans
- Stuckism
- New Sincerity
- Remodernism
- Remodernist film
- Post-postmodernism
- Cinema Verite
