= Brand New by Tomorrow =

Studio album by Money Mark
- Released: February 5, 2007
- Genre: Pop rock
- Length: 35:32
- Label: Brushfire
- Producer: Mario C.; Money Mark

Money Mark chronology
Change Is Coming (2001)	Brand New by Tomorrow (2007)	Stand Up for Your Rice! (2007)

Singles from Brand New by Tomorrow
- 1. "Pick Up the Pieces" Released: April 30, 2007

Brand New by Tomorrow is the fifth solo studio album by American musician Money Mark. It was released on February 5, 2007, through Brushfire Records. Recording sessions took place at Los Angeles, New York City and Rio de Janeiro. Production was handled by Money Mark himself together with Mario C.

In 2008, the song "Color of Your Blues" was used in comedy-drama independent film Birds of America and in the trailer for documentary film about the murder of Andrew Bagby, Dear Zachary: A Letter to a Son About His Father.

== Critical reception ==
Professional ratings
Aggregate scores
Source	Rating
Metacritic	62/100
Review scores
Source	Rating
AllMusic	3.5/5 stars
Alternative Press	4/5
IGN	6.4/10
laut.de	3/5 stars
Pitchfork	6.2
PopMatters	5/10
Tiny Mix Tapes	3.5/5 marks

Brand New by Tomorrow was met with generally favourable reviews from music critics. At Metacritic, which assigns a normalized rating out of 100 to reviews from mainstream publications, the album received an average score of 62, based on twelve reviews.

Eddie Fleisher of Alternative Press called the album "a collection of crisp, melodic pop tunes that showcase not only his musical abilities, but his vocal skills as well". AllMusic's John Bush found "Mark's laid-back stride keeps the affair surprisingly buoyant". Tiny Mix Tapes contributor resumed: "Money Mark has a typical singer-songwriter vocal presence, but lighthearted lyrics sprinkled with clever one-liners here and there do a sufficient job". Mark Richardson of Pitchfork called it "a loose, warm, and human-scale record that sounds pretty nice right out of the gate".

In his mixed review for PopMatters, Dan Raper stated: "Brand New by Tomorrow may be great background music, but it isn't anything but that". The melancholy nature of the lyrics about a failed relationship saw comparisons by some critics to Beck's 2002 album Sea Change.

== Track listing ==
All tracks are written by Mark Ramos-Nishita, except track 2 co-written with Jack Johnson.

No.	Title	Length
1.	"Color of Your Blues"	3:20
2.	"Pick Up the Pieces"	3:25
3.	"Summer Blue"	3:25
4.	"Pretend to Sleep"	2:21
5.	"My Loss, Your Gain"	3:05
6.	"Everyday I Die a Little"	3:09
7.	"Radiate Nothing"	3:15
8.	"Black Butterfly"	3:32
9.	"Nice to Me"	2:51
10.	"Eyes That Ring"	3:48
11.	"Brand New by Tomorrow"	3:21
Total length:		35:32

== Personnel ==
- "Money Mark" Ramos-Nishita – songwriter, vocals, guitar (tracks: 1, 4, 7, 10), bass (tracks: 1, 3, 5–7, 9, 10), drums (tracks: 1, 7), melodica (track 1), synthesizer (tracks: 1, 10), upright piano (track 2), electric harpsichord (track 2), Chamberlain strings keyboards (track 2), electric piano (track 3), piano (tracks: 4–6, 11), celeste (track 5), omnichord (track 6), harp (track 6), electric guitar (tracks: 6, 9), grand piano (track 8), Wurlitzer electric piano (track 8), percussion (track 9), acoustic guitar (track 11), producer, mixing
- Jack Johnson – songwriter (track 2)
- Claudia "Cava" Gonzalez – backing vocals (tracks: 4, 6, 8, 9)
- Woody Jackson – guitar & engineering (track 2), lap guitar (track 6)
- Carol Kaye – bass (track 2)
- Jim Keltner – drums (tracks: 2, 3, 8, 9)
- Danny Frankel – drums (track 5)
- Pedro Yanowitz – drums (track 6)
- Ryan Feves – double bass (track 8)
- Garrett Dutton – harmonica (track 9)
- Seth Swerling – French horn (track 10)
- Mario Caldato Jr. – producer, mixing
- Donny Whitbeck – engineering (tracks: 4, 5)
- Gary Benzel – art direction
- Todd St. John – art direction
- Robert Bennett – management
