= Performing Chicken =

EP by Money Mark
- Released: 1994
- Genre: Rock
- Label: Fido Speaks/Love Kit Records

Money Mark chronology
Ill Communication (1994)	Performing Chicken (1994)	Mark's Keyboard Repair (1995)

Performing Chicken is an EP by Money Mark released on Fido Speaks/Love Kit Records in 1994 as a 10" mini-album. The tracks on this release also comprise the first portion of his later album, Mark's Keyboard Repair.

== Track listing ==
Crater Side

- A1 Sunday, Gardena Blvd.
- A2 Insects Are All Around Us
- A3 Three Movements For The Wind: Theme For The Innocent Hostage
- A4 Three Movements For The Wind: Poets Walk
- A5 Three Movements For The Wind: Spooky
- A6 Cry

Chicken Side

- B1 Pretty Pain
- B2 No Fighting
- B3 Ba Ba Ba Boom
- B4 Have Clav Will Travel
- B5 Don't Miss The Boat
