= Mark's Keyboard Repair =

Studio album by Money Mark
- Released: 1995
- Genre: Lo-fi
- Length: 38:17
- Label: Mo' Wax
- Producer: Mark Ramos-Nishita

Money Mark chronology
| Performing Chicken (1994) | Mark's Keyboard Repair (1995) | Third Version EP (1996) |

Singles from Mark's Keyboard Repair
- 1. "Insects Are All Around Us" / "Cry" Released: 1995; 2. "Cry" Released: 1995

Mark's Keyboard Repair is the debut studio album by American musician Money Mark, released on the Mo' Wax label in 1995. It peaked at number 35 on the UK Albums Chart. "Insects Are All Around Us" / "Cry" was released as a single and reached number 99 on the UK Singles Chart. Later, "Cry" was released as a single again and reached number 80 on the chart.

Money Mark used principles inspired by Dogme 95 to record this album.

== Critical reception ==
Professional ratings
Review scores
| Source | Rating |
|---|---|
| AllMusic | 4/5 stars |
| Entertainment Weekly | A− |
| The Guardian | 4/5 stars |
| Muzik | 4/5 |
| Pitchfork | 9.0/10 |
| Rolling Stone | 3/5 stars |
| The Rolling Stone Album Guide | 2/5 stars |

The Independent opined: "The overall effect though is entirely fulfilling: the listener glides at will between a happy host of different cocktail hours, while Ramos-Nishita's natty organ doodles conjure up the diverse spirits of US jazz giant Wild Bill Davis and our own legendary Mrs Mills, empress of pub piano." NME listed Mark's Keyboard Repair as the 24th best album of 1995.

== Track listing ==
All tracks are written by Mark Ramos-Nishita.

Original edition
| No. | Title | Length |
|---|---|---|
| 1. | "Pretty Pain" | 3:10 |
| 2. | "No Fighting" | 1:28 |
| 3. | "Ba Ba Ba Boom" | 1:34 |
| 4. | "Have Clav Will Travel" | 1:27 |
| 5. | "Don't Miss the Boat" | 2:30 |
| 6. | "Sunday Gardena Blvd." | 1:32 |
| 7. | "Insects Are All Around Us" | 2:21 |
| 8. | "Scenes from..." | 1:07 |
| 9. | "Poets Walk" | 0:59 |
| 10. | "Spooky" | 1:07 |
| 11. | "Cry" | 2:19 |
| 12. | "Ease" | 2:57 |
| 13. | "Got My Hand in Your Head" | 1:39 |
| 14. | "That's for Sure / Sixth Synth" | 1:53 |
| 15. | "Invitation" | 2:06 |
| 16. | "Time Lapse Life" | 2:25 |
| 17. | "Seven, Seven, Seven" | 1:44 |
| 18. | "Sometimes You Gotta Make It Alone" | 2:31 |
| 19. | "Pinto's New Car" | 2:22 |
| Total length: | | 38:17 |

US reissue edition
| No. | Title | Length |
|---|---|---|
| 1. | "Pretty Pain" | 3:10 |
| 2. | "No Fighting" | 1:28 |
| 3. | "Ba Ba Ba Boom" | 1:34 |
| 4. | "Have Clav Will Travel" | 1:27 |
| 5. | "Don't Miss the Boat" | 2:30 |
| 6. | "Sunday Gardena Blvd." | 1:32 |
| 7. | "Insects Are All Around Us" | 2:21 |
| 8. | "Scenes from..." | 1:07 |
| 9. | "Poets Walk" | 0:59 |
| 10. | "Spooky" | 1:07 |
| 11. | "Cry" | 2:19 |
| 12. | "Ease" | 2:57 |
| 13. | "Got My Hand in Your Head" | 1:39 |
| 14. | "That's for Sure" | 0:37 |
| 15. | "Sixth Synth" | 1:16 |
| 16. | "Invitation" | 2:06 |
| 17. | "Time Lapse Life" | 2:25 |
| 18. | "Seven, Seven, Seven" | 1:44 |
| 19. | "Sometimes You Gotta Make It Alone" | 2:31 |
| 20. | "Pinto's New Car" | 2:22 |
| 21. | "Revolt of the Octopi" | 2:34 |
| 22. | "Never Stop" | 2:24 |
| 23. | "Slow Flames" | 2:20 |
| 24. | "Hard Ass" | 2:30 |
| 25. | "From the Beginning to the End" | 1:50 |
| 26. | "Functions" | 2:08 |
| 27. | "World Lesson Pt. 2" | 2:33 |
| 28. | "Inner Laugh" | 2:13 |
| 29. | "The Grade" | 4:38 |
| 30. | "Mark's Keyboard Repair" | 0:58 |
| Total length: | | 61:19 |

== Personnel ==
Credits adapted from liner notes.

- Mark Ramos-Nishita – production
- James Lavelle – A&R
- Ben Drury – sleeve design
- Will Bankhead – sleeve design
- Paul "Jazz" Thompson – color photography
- Mario Caldato Jr. – black and white photography

== Charts ==
| Chart (1995) | Peak position |
|---|---|
| UK Albums (Official Charts) | 35 |
