= Fuckland =

2000 film

- Directed by: José Luis Márques
- Written by: José Luis Márques
- Produced by: Edi Flehner; Mariano Suez; Juan Andrés
- Starring: Fabián Stratas; Camilla Heaney
- Cinematography: Alejandro Hartman; José Luis Marquès; Guillermo Naistat; Fabián Stratas
- Edited by: Pipo Bonamino
- Music by: Sergio Figueroa
- Release date: 21 September 2000 (Argentina)
- Running time: 87 minutes
- Country: Argentina
- Languages: Spanish; English
- Budget: $400,000

Fuckland is a 2000 Argentine black comedy-drama film written and directed by José Luis Márques. The picture was executive produced by Diego Dubcovsky, and produced by Edi Flehner and Mariano Suez. The film's plot follows an Argentinian man who travels to the Falkland Islands to impregnate a Native woman in order to demonstrate how to populate the islands with people of his nationality's descent.

The film was shot on digital video and is the first Latin American film to attempt follow the avant garde Dogme 95 movement minimalist guidelines, though it broke several of the guidelines.

== Plot ==
The film takes place decades after the Falklands War between Argentina and the United Kingdom for the control of the Falkland Islands in the South Atlantic Ocean. It tells of Fabián Stratas, a magician and stand-up comedian from Buenos Aires, who saves his money from weddings, birthdays, and bar mitzvahs, and uses a hidden camera to document a week-long trip to the Falkland Islands, which he calls "Fuckland". He plans to impregnate an islander, reasoning that if only 500 Argentines did the same each year, the islands would soon be overrun with half-Argentines, and he would be the head of a "sexual invasion".

He sets his eyes on Camilla Heaney, whom he first saw in church. He has initial success, having sex with Camilla twice, first in his hotel room and then on the beach. He manages to impregnate her before leaving for Buenos Aires, cocky and happy for having achieved his goal and duped his lover. However, Heaney gets the last word, making a videotape on Fabian's camera where she denounces him as shallow, condescending, and self-centered. After this, the camera shows Stratas, unfazed by Camilla's anger, taking a shower while singing the Charly García cover of the Argentine National Anthem.

== Cast ==
- Fabián Stratas
- Camilla Heaney

== Background ==
Screenshot of Fabián Stratas

The picture was recorded illegally in the Falkland Islands in 1999 and was made without the permission of the local government. It features only seven professional actors. They improvised their scenes with local residents, who were unaware that they were taking part in the production of a feature film. Heaney was not told of Stratas' motivations for their romance before their scenes were shot.

The picture broke some of the Dogme 95 guidelines, including the use of non-diegetic music, digital video, and a directorial credit. It was filmed using a Sony DCR-TRV900.

=== Filming locations ===
The film was filmed on location in Port Stanley in the Falkland Islands.

== Distribution ==
The producers used the tagline "a clandestine movie" (Spanish: una película clandestina) to market the film. The film opened in Argentina on 21 September 2000. It was presented at various film festivals, including the London Film Festival, the Melbourne International Film Festival, and the Sundance Film Festival.

== Critical reception ==
Critics disliked the film. Some called it subversive and libelous, while others like Christopher Null thought it boring. Null wrote: "While a few of our hero's 'smooth moves' are mildly entertaining, most of the film is filled with the monotony of his daily rituals. He does a few magic tricks, gets a haircut, brushes his teeth, takes a piss. Some of this is in focus. Fuckland indeed."

Amy Taubin of the Village Voice wrote: "Fuckland is less interesting for its adherence to the Dogme rules than as a failed attempt at director José Luis Márques's project of 'Real Fiction Filmmaking'...Unfortunately, the fictional premise of Fuckland is so absurd, it doomed the enterprise from the start."
