= Please Heat This Eventually =

EP by Omar Rodríguez-López
- Released: December 2006 / January 23, 2007
- Recorded: November 14, 2005 (live segments)
- Genres: Progressive rock, jazz fusion, experimental rock
- Length: 25:20 (vinyl); 24:49 (single-track version)
- Label: Gold Standard Laboratories
- Producer: Omar Rodríguez-López

Omar Rodríguez-López solo chronology
Omar Rodriguez (2005)	Please Heat This Eventually (2006)	Se Dice Bisonte, No Búfalo (2007)

Omar Rodríguez-López chronology
Amputechture (2006)	Please Heat This Eventually (2006)	The Bedlam in Goliath (2008)

Omar Rodríguez-López live chronology
Scabdates (2005)	Please Heat This Eventually (2006)	Los Sueños de un Hígado (2009)

Professional ratings
Review scores
Source	Rating
Allmusic	link
Pitchfork Media	6.0/10 link
Ultimate Guitar	8.4/10 link

Please Heat This Eventually is a 12" EP from Gold Standard Laboratories and is a collaboration between Omar Rodríguez-López Group and Damo Suzuki of the group Can. It features both live performance of the group (then named Omar Rodriguez-Lopez Quintet) with Suzuki in Cologne, Germany on November 14, 2005, and studio recorded elements arranged together into one extended piece. The EP consists of a single 25-minute track split up over both sides of the record. Parts 1, 2, and 3 appear on side 1 and parts 4, 5, and 6 appear on side 2. It was released commercially on January 23, 2007 on vinyl, though GSL pre-orders began shipping in December 2006.

A shorter, instrumental version of the song (recorded live in Kortrijk, Belgium) appears on Se Dice Bisonte, No Búfalo, while the full EP with Damo's vocals appears as a bonus CD on the Japanese edition of the same album. A single track version of 24:49 is now available via Omar's digital store.

Cover design is by Sonny Kay, who continued to have artistic involvement in many of Omar's records.

== Track listing ==
All tracks are written by Omar Rodríguez-López.

No.	Title	Length
1.	"Please Heat This Eventually" (Pts. I, II, & III)	13:06
2.	"Please Heat This Eventually" (Pts. IV, V, & VI)	12:14
Total length:		25:20

== Personnel ==
- Damo Suzuki – vocals
- Omar Rodríguez-López – guitars
- Juan Alderete – bass
- Money Mark – keyboards
- Adrián Terrazas-González – saxophone, bass clarinet, flute, percussion
- Marcel Rodríguez-López – drums
- Jon Debaun – recording engineer
