= The Apocalypse Inside of an Orange =

Studio album by Omar Rodriguez-Lopez Quintet
- Released: November 20, 2007
- Recorded: 2005 in Amsterdam, Kortrijk and Cologne
- Genre: Jazz fusion, psychedelic rock, free jazz, experimental
- Length: 60:59
- Label: Infrasonic Sound
- Producer: Omar Rodríguez-López

Omar Rodríguez-López solo chronology
Omar Rodriguez Lopez & Lydia Lunch (2007)	The Apocalypse Inside of an Orange (2007)	Calibration (Is Pushing Luck and Key Too Far) (2007)

Omar Rodríguez-López chronology
Amputechture (2006)	The Apocalypse Inside of an Orange (2007)	The Bedlam in Goliath (2008)

The Apocalypse Inside of an Orange is the fourth studio album by Omar Rodríguez-López, and the third released in the "Amsterdam series". The double LP was released on November 20, 2007. The CD version followed in March 2008. By December 2010, the clear vinyl edition was out of print. However, the album was released in Europe on Willie Anderson Recordings, both on CD and double black vinyl.

== Overview ==
The Apocalypse Inside of an Orange blends the genres of jazz, Latin, experimental rock, and psychedelic rock and delves more heavily into jazz than any previous venture in Rodríguez-López's discography. The tracks incorporate extended-length jams while also implementing spoken word which reflects philosophic themes of the record. The concept album is credited to the Omar Rodriguez Lopez Quintet and features an alternate version of the song Jacob van Lennepkade from the album Omar Rodriguez that is based on a live recording from a concert in Kortrijk, Belgium. It also includes a live take of "Vondelpark Bij Nacht" in the form of the title track, also from the self-titled record.

== Reception ==
Professional ratings
Review scores
Source	Rating
AllMusic	4/5 stars
Sputnikmusic	4/5 stars

The Apocalypse Inside of an Orange has received generally favorable reviews. Sputnikmusic praises Rodríguez-López's jazz influence, stating that the implementation of trancing musical elements and tribalistic percussion instruments are reminiscent of Miles Davis' Bitches Brew album. Sputnik also notes the spiritual themes of the album and how the work illustrates Rodríguez-López's growth as an artist. The Italian review site DeBaser, described The Apocalypse Inside of an Orange as having "peaks of absolute quality."

Treble Magazine mentioned the album as one of the most essential in Rodríguez-López's discography, characterizing it as "full of wild bursts of jazz and psychedelic craziness." Kerrang! noted the talent imbued within the record and how it might take the audience multiple listens to make sense of it.

== Track listing ==
All tracks are written by Omar Rodríguez-López.

No.	Title	Length
1.	"Melting Chariots"	3:53
2.	"Knee Deep in the Loving Hush of Heresy"	6:06
3.	"Jacob van Lennepkade II"	18:39
4.	"Fuerza de Liberacion"	5:32
5.	"Spared from the Insult List"	6:07
6.	"Baby Fat"	2:51
7.	"The Apocalypse Inside of an Orange"	11:12
8.	"Coma Pony"	6:39
Total length:		60:59

== Release history ==
Date	Label	Format
November 20, 2007	Infrasonic Sound	Vinyl
December 11, 2007	Infrasonic Sound	Digital download
February 26, 2008	Rodriguez Lopez Productions, Infrasonic Sound	CD (directly from label)
March 11, 2008	Rodriguez Lopez Productions, Infrasonic Sound	CD (widespread release)
March 17, 2008	Rodriguez Lopez Productions, Willie Anderson Recordings (Europe)	Vinyl, CD
March 25, 2008	Rodriguez Lopez Productions, Willie Anderson Recordings (Europe)	CD (Import)

== Personnel ==
- Omar Rodríguez-López – engineering, guitars, voice (4)
- Juan Alderete – bass
- Adrián Terrazas-González – saxophone, bass clarinet, flute, percussion
- Marcel Rodriguez-Lopez – drums, percussion, keyboards (except 3 & 7)
- Money Mark Ramos Nishita – keyboards & synthesizer (3, 7)

=== Production ===
- Lars Stalfors – engineering
- Jon Debaun – engineering
- Shaun Michael Sullivan – mixing
- Pete Lyman – mastering

=== Artwork ===
- Sonny Kay – layout, design
