= Pluginmanifesto =

The pluginmanifesto is a document written by Ana Kronschnabl that looks at the challenges for filmmaking for the Internet and other reduced bandwidth platforms (such as mobile phones, PDAs and PlayStation Portables). The author noted, "The pluginmanifesto arose out of a need...In discussion with others we realised that most people assumed that we [those who make web films] were approaching this new technology from the same angle that many others were – that of trying to deliver film or television over the Internet. This was not what we were trying to do. We felt that the Internet was not just a new viewing platform, but a new medium, as different as TV is from film and film is from theatre."

The document is written in the tradition of other creative manifestos, such as the Dogme95 manifesto. The pluginmanifesto was launched at the Watershed Media Centre in Bristol on 17 May 2001. The author never intended the manifesto to remain a static document, but looked for wider input and evolution of the ideas within, "The text of the pluginmanifesto can be freely copied and modified. Indeed we encourage you, along with other filmmakers, artists, geeks and web-users, to take the contents of this document and evolve it in-line with your experiences, ideas and perspectives" The manifesto was published as copyleft under the Design Science License and the author encouraged others to revise or re-write the document as they wished.

== Responses to the Pluginmanifesto ==
Following its launch, the pluginmanifeso created a limited response on the Internet. OffScreen.com noted the value of attempting to understand cinema on the Internet using documents such as the pluginmanifesto;

"The more interesting and potentially groundbreaking ventures are the web sites that are dedicated exclusively to internet cinema....Plugincinema is a good place to start for newbies to the world of internet cinema because it has a pluginmanifesto which lays out the philosophy of their understanding of internet cinema."

While some video artists, such as Jonathan Brann and Geert Wachtelaer referenced it as an influence in their work;

"Inspired by...the plugin manifesto. The pluginmanifesto is a document written by Ana Kronschnabl that looks at the challenges for filmmaking for the internet and other reduced bandwidth platforms..."

Others, such as Steve Bennett (of Iron Fist Motion Pictures) wrote their own response in the form of an alternative manifesto. The pluginmanifesto makes similar points to the 'Neocinema' manifesto (called 'Dogma 2001: The New Rules for Internet Cinema') and indeed some have confused the two documents. Since its launch it has continued to be talked about at digital media events (for example at the FOSS workshops).

The manifesto was also discussed by Anna Notaro in the journal, 'The Velvet Light Trap' in an article entitled 'Technology in Search of an Artist: Questions of Auteurism/Authorship and the Contemporary Cinematic Experience' Other writers have also discussed its ideas such as blogger 'mayoke' in her essay 'The Future of the 7th Art' and also by Dr.Simone Kurtzke's 2007 thesis 'Web Film Theory';

"The manifesto thus is intended as a tool to call forth a new film movement. The aim is to provide an intellectual and theoretical framework under which webfilmmakers can help create what the authors consider the new ‘art form’ of webfilm. Despite this aim, we have seen that much of the manifesto consists of a usability guide to Internet-friendly webfilmmaking, foregrounding its technological aspects. As such, it functions as prescription material and illustrates the power of non-human agents including bandwidth, hardware and software."

In October 2007 The manifesto was discussed at the conference 'Video Vortex: Responses to YouTube' in Brussels under the title 'The pluginmanifesto: presaging the rise of YouTube?'

== See also ==
- Film
- Web film
- Dogme95
