= Web film =

Film made with the medium of the Internet

A web film is a film made with the medium of the Internet and its distribution constraints in mind. This term aims to differentiate content made for the Internet from content made for other media, such as cinema or television, that has been converted into a World Wide Web-compatible format. Web films are a form of new media.

== Forms ==
There are broadly three forms of films that can be encountered on the Internet:

Form	Description	Defining Features	Example
Traditional promotion	A digitised version of films shot with the same production methods and technology used for TV/Cinema.	Often 35mm or high definition digital footage. (Usually highly compressed when on web.)	Cinema trailers online, for example the trailer for Lord of the Rings.
Films not made for, but distributed via the Internet	A film taking advantage of the Internet for distribution.	Often large files and/or designed to be downloaded not streamed.	The short film 405 The Movie or releases in file sharing communities.
Web films	Films made with the medium of the Internet and its constraints in mind.	Made in harmony with Internet & computer technologies such as streaming or Flash or After Effects.	The short film Distance Over Time and An EX and PT Movie

== See also ==
- Pluginmanifesto
- Web series
