= Lovers (1999 film) =

- Directed by: Jean-Marc Barr
- Written by: Jean-Marc Barr; Pascal Arnold
- Produced by: Pascal Arnold
- Starring: Élodie Bouchez; Sergej Trifunović
- Cinematography: Jean-Marc Barr
- Edited by: Brian Schmitt
- Production companies: Bar Nothing; TF1 International; Tolodo
- Release date: 8 December 1999
- Running time: 100 minutes
- Country: France
- Languages: English; French; Serbo-Croatian
- Budget: $800,000
- Box office: $92,000

Lovers is a 1999 French drama film directed by Jean-Marc Barr. It was the fifth film and the first non-Danish film to be made under the self-imposed rules of the Dogme 95 manifesto.

== Plot ==
Jeanne and Dragan meet in a Paris bookshop. She works there and he is looking for a book on the English painter Dante Gabriel Rossetti. The two strike up a passionate affair, but Dragan does not tell her that he is in the country illegally.

== Cast ==
- Élodie Bouchez as Jeanne
- Sergej Trifunović as Dragan
- Dragan Nikolic as Zlatan
- Geneviève Page as Alice
- Thibault de Montalembert as Jean-Michel
- Philippe Duquesne as The client
