= Money Mark =

American producer and musician

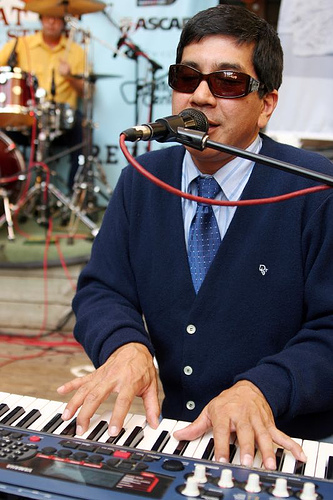
- Money Mark in March 2007

Background information
- Born: Mark Ramos Nishita; February 10, 1960 (age 66); Detroit, Michigan, U.S.
- Origin: Los Angeles, California, U.S.
- Genres: Alternative rock; pop rock; hip hop; nu jazz
- Occupations: Musician; record producer
- Instruments: Keyboards; melodica
- Years active: 1991–present
- Label: Various

Mark Ramos Nishita (born February 10, 1960), known professionally as Money Mark, is an American producer and musician, best known for his collaborations with the Beastie Boys from 1992 until 2011.

== Early life ==
Born in Detroit to a Japanese-Hawaiian father and a Chicana mother, Nishita moved with his family to Los Angeles, California, when he was six years old.

== Career ==
His first album, Mark's Keyboard Repair (1995), was made up of keyboard driven pop-funk songs recorded at demo quality. Guy Ritchie used a song from the album in the film, Lock, Stock and Two Smoking Barrels. This was followed up by the Third Version EP (1996) and Push the Button (1998), for which Mark received critical praise. Whereas his 1996 EP was similar to his debut, Push the Button was extremely eclectic, combining aspects of rock music and pop with soul, funk and hip hop. This LP was met with good reviews, as was his 2001 follow up Change Is Coming which had a tropical yet danceable disco and funk sound.

Mark met the Beastie Boys during their migration to the West Coast, through mutual friend, Mario Caldato Jr., who asked Mark (who was working as a carpenter) to fix the wooden gate at the entrance of the property where the band was staying when they were recording Paul's Boutique. He helped them build their new studio (G-Son Studios), and quickly became a principal collaborator. He performed, wrote, and collaborated on every Beastie Boys album from 1992's Check Your Head to the group's final album, 2011's Hot Sauce Committee Part Two. Mark co-authored the Grammy Award winning album The Mix-Up.

Money Mark contributed the keyboard phrase that opens and underpins "Where It's At" from Beck's 1996 album, Odelay. He played keyboards on tour for the Omar Rodriguez-Lopez Quintet in support of their self-titled album. He has since become a full member of the quintet, appearing on the live EP with Damo Suzuki (of Can fame) called Please Heat This Eventually and several other albums, with his debut full-length collaboration with the group being the Quintet's second LP release, The Apocalypse Inside of an Orange. In 1996, Money Mark contributed the song "Use Your Head (Use a Sua Cabeca)" to the AIDS benefit album Red Hot + Rio produced by the Red Hot Organization. He also contributed songs to Red Hot's Silencio=Muerte: Red Hot + Latin and Red Hot + Rhapsody, a tribute to George Gershwin. In 2004, Mark scored and played all instruments for HBO's first ever documentary prime time series, "Family Bond's," directed by Steve Santor. That same year, Mark also contributed original songs and score cues for the films Along Came Polly, Fun With Dick And Jane and The Devil Wears Prada.

In September 2006, Money Mark signed to Jack Johnson's Brushfire Records label. Brand New By Tomorrow, his first album with Brushfire, was released in February 2007. In late 2006, he opened for Gnarls Barkley at the Riviera Theatre in Chicago. In 2007, Money Mark and The Woodrow Jackson Orchestra recorded a cover version of Love Unlimited Orchestra's "Love's Theme" for Engine Room Recordings' compilation album Guilt by Association. Money Mark composed original music for the 2008 documentary film Beautiful Losers.

In 2011, he contributed the Mario C. Remix of "Tropicaliá" with Beck and Seu Jorge, and played Hammond B-3 organ on "Look Around" from the Red Hot Chili Peppers album I'm With You, as well as a version of the song "Tropical Affair" with Thalma de Freitas and João Parahyba for Red Hot Organization's most recent benefit album Red Hot + Rio 2, the follow-up to 1996's Red Hot + Rio. Proceeds from the sales were donated to raise awareness and money to fight AIDS/HIV and related health and social issues.

Mark scored the Slamdance Audience Award-winning and critically acclaimed documentary film, Getting Up: The Tempt One Story.

Money Mark worked alongside Mike McCready and Stefan Lessard and contributed to many of the tracks used in the soundtrack to the 2011 film, Horrible Bosses.

He performed in 2011 with Karen O on her pop opera Stop the Virgens.

Over the course of his career, Mark has done recording sessions with the Rolling Stones, Iggy Pop, Nile Rodgers, Yoko Ono, Carlos Santana, Lee Scratch Perry, Jorge Ben, Dangermouse, Moby, Mixmaster Mike, the Yeah Yeah Yeahs, Red Hot Chili Peppers, Seu Jorge, Jack Johnson, and The Mars Volta.

He was a regular guest on DVDASA, a podcast hosted by David Choe and Asa Akira. He is also part of the band, Mangchi, with David Choe and Steven Lee.

In the spring of 2016, it was announced that Money Mark would be touring with The Claypool Lennon Delirium, a collaboration between Les Claypool and Sean Lennon. From the Prawn Song Newsletter, "Les Claypool and Sean Lennon’s newly formed band, The Claypool Lennon Delirium, will hit the road this summer for an extensive tour of the United States. Rounding out the band with Les and Sean will be Money Mark on keyboards and Paulo Baldi on drums. In addition to playing Bonnaroo, Vertex and Peach festivals, The Claypool Lennon Delirium will play a number of headline shows across the country."

On July 31, 2020, he was featured on Linkin Park frontman Mike Shinoda’s third studio album, Dropped Frames, Vol. 2, on the track “Isolation Bird.”

In 2021, talent manager Tamayu Takayama connected Money Mark with the Japanese girl group Atarashii Gakko. He co-wrote and produced songs on their SNACKTIME EP, their debut on the 88rising label, and their 2024 album AG! Calling. He is credited with spurring the evolution of the group's sound and image.

On July 20, 2023, he performed on the keyboard for Cypress Hill on the NPR YouTube series Tiny Desk.

== Solo discography ==
Money Mark discography
- Studio albums: 7
- Extended plays: 5
- Live albums: 1
- Singles: 7

=== Studio albums ===
- Mark's Keyboard Repair (1995, Mo' Wax)
- Push the Button (1998, Mo' Wax)
- Change Is Coming (2001)
- Father Demo Square (2005, Rush! Production)
- Brand New by Tomorrow (2007, Brushfire Records)
- Stand Up for Your Rice! (2007, Rush! Production)
- Songs from Studio D (2011, Rush! Production)

=== Live albums ===
- Mark on the Mike (1998, Toy's Factory)

=== Extended plays ===
- Performing Chicken EP (1994, Fido Speaks Music/Love Kit Records)
- Legitimate Pop Songs? - Money Mark Live at Rough Trade (1996, Mo' Wax)
- Third Version EP (1996, Mo' Wax)
- Love Stains: A Demo (2002)
- Demo? Or Demolition? EP (2004, Chocolate Industries)

=== Singles ===
- "Insects Are All Around Us" / "Cry" (1995)
- "Cry" (1995)
- "Hand in Your Head" (1998)
- "Maybe I'm Dead" (1998)
- "Burn Away" (2005)
- "Pick Up the Pieces" (2006)

=== Compilations ===
- "Spiders" Dimension Mix: A Tribute to Dimension 5 Records - Eenie Meenie Records (2005)

=== Releases on Mo' Wax ===
- MW 034 LP Mark's Keyboard Repair LP
- MW 090 Push The Button LP
- MW 090 LP Push The Button LP (One 12", One 10" & One 7")
- MW 032 Insects Are All Around Us / Cry 7"
- MW 036 Cry 12"
- MW 032 P Album Sampler 10"
- MW 043 DJ Third Version 7" (Promo)
- MW 043 MLP Third Version EP 10" (Mini Album)
- MW 044 Legitimate Pop Songs? - Money Mark Live At Rough Trade 7"
- MW 066 Hand In Your Head 12"
- MW 066 DJ Cry (Dust Brothers Remix) / Got My Hand In Your Head (New Mix) 10" (Promo)
- MW 066 DJ2 Hand In Your Head 12" (Promo)
- MW 089 Maybe I'm Dead 12"
- MW 089 DJ Maybe I'm Dead 12" (White Label Promo)
- MW 089 S Maybe I'm Dead 7" (Ltd 7" Shaped Chihuahua)

== Collaboration discography ==
With Atarashii Gakko

- SNACKTIME (2021)
- AG! Calling (2024)

With the Beastie Boys

- Check Your Head (1992)
- Ill Communication (1994)
- The In Sound from Way Out (1996)
- Hello Nasty (1998)
- The Mix-Up (2007)
- Hot Sauce Committee Part Two (2011)

With Banyan

- Banyan (1997)

With Danger Doom

- The Mouse and the Mask (2005)

With Omar Rodriguez Lopez Group

- Please Heat This Eventually (2006)
- Se Dice Bisonte, No Búfalo (2007)
- Omar Rodriguez-Lopez & Lydia Lunch (2007)
- The Apocalypse Inside of an Orange (2007)
- Calibration (Is Pushing Luck and Key Too Far) (2007)

With Hello Seahorse!

- Lejos. No tan Lejos (2010)

With Big Sir

- Und Die Scheiße Ändert Sich Immer (2006)
- Before Gardens After Gardens (2012)

With the John Butler Trio

- Grand National (2007)

With Nação Zumbi

- Track "Assustado", from album Fome de Tudo (2007)

With Joseph D'Anvers

- Kids (2008)

With Yo Gabba Gabba

- Robodancing (2008)

With Kinky

- Those Girls (2009)

With Shawn Lee and Tommy Guerrero

- Lord Newborn and The Magic Skulls (2009)

With Red Hot Chili Peppers

- I'm With You (2011)

With Boots Electric

- Honkey Kong (2011)

With Linkin Park

- Recharged (2012)

With Halo Orbit

- Halo Orbit (2016)

With The Claypool Lennon Delirium

- The Monolith Of Phobos (2016)

With Molotov

- Unplugged (2018)

With TT

- LoveLaws (2018)

With Mexican Dubwiser

- Nobody is Perfect (2018)
