= Push the Button (Money Mark album) =

Studio album by Money Mark
- Released: May 4, 1998
- Genre: Guitar pop
- Length: 52:05
- Label: Mo' Wax
- Producer: Mark Ramos-Nishita; Mario Caldato Jr.

Money Mark chronology
Third Version EP (1996)	Push the Button (1998)	Change Is Coming (2001)

Singles from Push the Button
- 1. "Hand in Your Head" Released: 1998; 2. "Maybe I'm Dead" Released: 1998

Professional ratings
Review scores
Source	Rating
AllMusic	4/5 stars
Entertainment Weekly	A−
Los Angeles Times	3/4 stars
Melody Maker	4.5/5 stars
Muzik	9/10
NME	7/10
Pitchfork	5.2/10
Rolling Stone	3.5/5 stars
The Rolling Stone Album Guide	3/5 stars
Vox	4/5 stars

Push the Button is the second studio album by American musician Money Mark, originally released on the Mo' Wax label in 1998. It peaked at number 17 on the UK Albums Chart.

"Hand in Your Head" and "Maybe I'm Dead" were released as singles, the former reaching number 40 and the latter reaching number 45 on the UK Singles Chart.

== Track listing ==
All tracks are written by Mark Ramos-Nishita.

No.	Title	Length
1.	"Push the Button"	2:55
2.	"Too Like You"	2:46
3.	"Monkey Dot"	2:03
4.	"Tomorrow Will Be Like Today"	3:36
5.	"Poor Shakes"	0:31
6.	"Bossa Nova 101"	1:15
7.	"Rock in the Rain"	3:38
8.	"Crowns"	3:26
9.	"All the People"	3:34
10.	"Underneath It All"	3:06
11.	"I Don't Play Piano"	4:12
12.	"Destroyer"	2:22
13.	"Hand in Your Head"	3:43
14.	"Trust"	2:59
15.	"Maybe I'm Dead"	4:02
16.	"Dha Teen Ta"	2:30
17.	"Powerhouse"	3:34
18.	"Harmonics of Life"	1:53

== Personnel ==
Credits adapted from liner notes.

Musicians

- Mark Ramos-Nishita – vocals, keyboards, guitar
- Sean Lennon – bass guitar
- Russell Simins – drums
- Alfredo Ortiz – drums (4)
- Hutch Hutchinson – bass guitar (7)
- Jim Keltner – drums (7, 11)
- Al McKibbon – bass guitar (8)
- Rocco Bidlovski – drums (8)
- Stuart Wylen – flute (8)
- Eric Bobo – percussion (8)
- Craig Fundinga – vibraphone (8)
- Tony McDaniel – bass guitar (11)

Technical

- Mark Ramos-Nishita – production (1, 4–7, 9, 10, 12–18)
- Mario Caldato Jr. – production (1–4, 7, 8, 11, 13)
- Craig Silvey – additional production (4, 15–18)
- Jim Abbiss – additional production (9)
- Ben Drury – design, button photography
- Tamra Davis – Money Mark photography
- James Lavelle – A&R
- Robert Bennett – management

== Charts ==
Chart (1998)	Peak position
Scottish Albums (OCC)	24
UK Albums (OCC)	17
UK Independent Albums (OCC)	1
