= Stand Up for Your Rice! =

Stand Up For Your Rice!

Studio album by Money Mark
- Released: 2007-11-21
- Label: Rush! Production

Stand Up For Your Rice! is a 2007 album by Money Mark released in Japan only.

== Track listing ==
1. "Turkey Pot Pie"
2. "You And I Pretend"
3. "Song With Gas"
4. "Percolate"
5. "The Monte Cristo"
6. "Silly Putty"
7. "Upon Closer Inspection"
8. "Happy Life"
9. "Notorious Fig"
10. "Remy's Night"
11. "Sprout Patrol"
12. "The Vegan Menace"
13. "Nanobot Highway"
14. "Double-M Ten"

== Personnel ==
Recorded and edited By Nick Pavey, mixed by Yonatan Elkayam and mastered by Dave Cooley.
