= Omar Rodriguez (album) =

Studio album by Omar Rodríguez-López
- Released: December 5, 2005
- Recorded: June & August 2005
- Studio: E-clat Morgue Portable Disaster Unit
- Genre: Jazz fusion, experimental
- Length: 43:09
- Label: Willie Anderson Recordings
- Producer: Omar Rodríguez-López

Omar Rodríguez-López solo chronology
The Special 12 Singles Series (2005)	Omar Rodriguez (2005)	Please Heat This Eventually (2006)

Omar Rodríguez-López chronology
Scabdates (2005)	Omar Rodriguez (2005)	Amputechture (2006)

Professional ratings
Review scores
Source	Rating
Allmusic	3.5/5 stars
Pitchfork Media	(7.1/10)

Omar Rodriguez is the second studio album by The Mars Volta guitarist Omar Rodríguez-López and the first in the "Amsterdam series" (written and recorded in the city in early June 2005). Most of the overdubs were done on the road in August 2005 (during The Mars Volta North American tour) and the album was mixed in September. Gold Standard Laboratories began offering a limited edition vinyl picture disc of this release for mail order in December 2006.

The Omar Rodriguez-Lopez Quintet, which formed in unison with the release of this record, toured Europe in November 2005 in support of this new release. Joining then on stage for their November 14, 2005 performance in Cologne, Germany was Damo Suzuki, for the song "Please Heat This Eventually" which would resurface on the next two releases from the group.

The centerpiece of the album, Jacob van Lennepkade (which was also recorded at the same November 14, 2005 show and later released on The Apocalypse Inside of an Orange as the title track) is named after the street in which Omar lived during its recording in Amsterdam.

== Track listing ==
All tracks are written by Omar Rodríguez-López.

No.	Title	Length
1.	"Een Ode Aan Ed van der Elsken" (A Tribute to Ed van der Elsken)	3:22
2.	"Regenbogen Stelen Van Prostituees" (Stealing Rainbows from Prostitutes)	10:06
3.	"Jacob van Lennepkade"	17:27
4.	"Vondelpark Bij Nacht" (Vondelpark by Night)	7:11
5.	"Spookrijden Op Het Fietspad" (Wrong-way Driving on the Bicycle Path)	5:03
Total length:		43:09

== Personnel ==
- Omar Rodríguez-López – guitar, sitar, bass, gong, percussion
- Adrián Terrazas-González – saxophone, bass clarinet, percussion
- Marcel Rodríguez-López – drums, keyboards, gong, percussion
- Juan Alderete – bass (2)
- Jon Debaun – recording engineer, bass (3)
- Cedric Bixler-Zavala – tambora (4)
- Eric Salas – drums (5)
