= Live at the Aragon =

Live album by Mastodon
- Released: March 15, 2011
- Recorded: October 17, 2009
- Venue: Aragon Ballroom, Chicago
- Genre: Progressive metal, sludge metal
- Length: 73:40
- Label: Reprise; Sire

Mastodon chronology
Jonah Hex: Revenge Gets Ugly EP (2010)	Live at the Aragon (2011)	The Hunter (2011)

Live at the Aragon is a live CD/DVD by the metal band Mastodon. It was released on March 15, 2011. It was filmed on October 17, 2009 during a Mastodon live show in the historic Aragon Ballroom of Chicago, part of their world tour to support their fourth album, Crack the Skye. It features Crack the Skye at its entirety as well as other Mastodon songs from Remission, Leviathan and Blood Mountain, their first, second and third records respectively. To promote the album the band released the live versions of "Oblivion", "Ghost of Karelia" and "Crack the Skye" on YouTube. The DVD also features the Crack the Skye film, which is the album in video format, in its entirety.

== Reception ==
Professional ratings
Review scores
Source	Rating
Allmusic	3/5 stars

Thom Jurek of Allmusic described the live performance by stating "There is little to no spontaneity or improvisation -- which is neither here nor there -- because what Mastodon do musically is so impressive. All their stop-and-start, fret-ripping, finger-cracking, knotty riffology and technical acumen are on full display." He also added that "The band's "cleaned up" vocals are disappointing live: neither Brent Hinds, Troy Sanders or Brann Dailor sing on key anywhere here. Given that 'sung vocals' highlighting lyrics are such an important part of the band's M.O. now, this is distracting, almost to a fault."

== Track listing ==
All tracks are written by Mastodon, except additional lyrics on "Aqua Dementia" and "Crack the Skye" by Scott Kelly and "The Bit" by Buzz Osborne and Dale Crover.

No.	Title	Lead vocals	Length
1.	"Oblivion"	Brann Dailor, Troy Sanders, Brent Hinds	6:31
2.	"Divinations"	Hinds, Sanders, Dailor	3:43
3.	"Quintessence"	Hinds, Sanders	5:13
4.	"The Czar: I. "Usurper"; II. "Escape"; III. "Martyr"; IV. "Spiral""	Hinds, Sanders	10:42
5.	"Ghost of Karelia"	Sanders, Hinds	5:24
6.	"Crack the Skye"	Sanders, Dailor	6:07
7.	"The Last Baron"	Hinds, Sanders	15:55
8.	"Circle of Cysquatch"	Sanders, Hinds	3:04
9.	"Aqua Dementia"	Hinds, Sanders	4:22
10.	"Where Strides the Behemoth"	Sanders, Hinds, Bill Kelliher	2:52
11.	"Mother Puncher"	Sanders, Kelliher	4:16
12.	"The Bit" (Melvins cover)	Hinds, Sanders	5:31
Total length:			73:40

== Personnel ==
Mastodon

- Brann Dailor – drums, vocals, percussion
- Brent Hinds – lead guitar, vocals, banjo
- Bill Kelliher – rhythm guitar
- Troy Sanders – bass, vocals, bass synth

Additional musician

- Derek Mitchka - keyboards

== Charts ==
Chart (2011)	Peak position
Finnish Albums (Suomen virallinen lista)	23
UK Rock Albums (OCC)	9
US Billboard 200	71
US Hard Rock Albums (Billboard)	4
US Top Rock Albums (Billboard)	16
