= Live at Brixton (Mastodon album) =

Live album by Mastodon
- Released: December 10, 2013
- Recorded: February 11, 2012
- Venue: Brixton Academy (London)
- Length: 93:42
- Label: Reprise

Mastodon chronology
The Hunter (2011)	Live at Brixton (2013)	Once More 'Round the Sun (2014)

Live at Brixton is the second live album by metal band Mastodon. It was released in December 2013 as a digital only release, and on April 19, 2014, as a Record Store Day exclusive Vinyl.

== Reception ==
Pitchfork gave the album a positive review with Paul Thompson saying "If Mastodon never get around to a greatest hits package, Live at Brixton will do the trick".

Rolling Stone magazine listed the album #19 in the 20 best metal albums of 2013.

Chris Conaton of PopMatters rated the album 7 out of 10. Wrapping up his review with "this is a well-made concert film of a band playing at their best".

== Track listing ==
All tracks are written by Mastodon, except additional lyrics on "Aqua Dementia" and "Crack the Skye" by Scott Kelly.

No.	Title	Original album	Length
1.	"Dry Bone Valley"	The Hunter (2011)	3:54
2.	"Black Tongue"	The Hunter	3:26
3.	"Crystal Skull"	Blood Mountain (2006)	3:31
4.	"I Am Ahab"	Leviathan (2004)	2:52
5.	"Capillarian Crest"	Blood Mountain	4:23
6.	"Colony of Birchmen"	Blood Mountain	4:53
7.	"Megalodon"	Leviathan	4:31
8.	"Thickening"	The Hunter	4:56
9.	"Blasteroid"	The Hunter	2:26
10.	"Sleeping Giant"	Blood Mountain	5:32
11.	"Ghost of Karelia"	Crack the Skye (2009)	5:28
12.	"All the Heavy Lifting"	The Hunter	4:25
13.	"Spectrelight"	The Hunter	3:17
14.	"Curl of the Burl"	The Hunter	3:33
15.	"Bedazzled Fingernails"	The Hunter	3:21
16.	"Circle of Cysquatch"	Blood Mountain	3:05
17.	"Guitar solo"	Live at Brixton	0:55
18.	"Aqua Dementia"	Leviathan	3:51
19.	"Crack the Skye"	Crack the Skye	6:00
20.	"Where Strides the Behemoth"	Remission (2002)	3:02
21.	"Iron Tusk"	Leviathan	2:48
22.	"March of the Fire Ants"	Remission	4:48
23.	"Blood and Thunder"	Leviathan	3:50
24.	"Creature Lives"	The Hunter	4:55
Total length:			93:42

== Personnel ==
- Troy Sanders – bass, vocals
- Brent Hinds – lead guitar, vocals
- Bill Kelliher – rhythm guitar, backing vocals
- Brann Dailor – drums, vocals
