= Curl of the Burl =

Single by Mastodon

from the album The Hunter
- Released: August 16, 2011
- Recorded: Doppler Studios, Atlanta, Georgia
- Genre: Stoner rock
- Length: 3:40
- Label: Reprise, Roadrunner
- Songwriters: Brann Dailor, Brent Hinds, Bill Kelliher, Troy Sanders
- Producer: Mike Elizondo

Mastodon singles chronology
"Black Tongue" (2011)	"Curl of the Burl" (2011)	"Dry Bone Valley" (2012)

"Curl of the Burl" is a single by American heavy metal band Mastodon from their fifth studio album, The Hunter. It was released August 16, 2011, as the second single from the album. The single was the band's most successful song on the Mainstream Rock Songs chart at release, peaking at No. 15. It would eventually lose its title to Emperor of Sand's "Show Yourself". It was nominated for a 2011 Grammy Award in the category Best Hard Rock/Metal Performance.

== Music video ==
A music video was produced for the song and was directed by Roboshobo. The video was uploaded to the band's official YouTube account on September 20, 2011. The video focuses on a man (played by Bill Oberst Jr.) who chops down a tree carrying a warning sign, snorts a rough powder made of its wood, and becomes intoxicated. He grows an extra set of arms. The man keeps snorting the powder to the point that he is transformed into an archetypal lumberjack. He proceeds to stomp through the woods felling trees and encounters a group of women (one of whom is played by Keisha Kimball). The women strip him and reveal he is a log and set him on fire.

== Charts ==
Chart (2011)	Peak position
US Alternative Airplay (Billboard)	32
US Mainstream Rock (Billboard)	15
US Rock & Alternative Airplay (Billboard)	27

== Personnel ==
- Brann Dailor – drums, lead vocals
- Troy Sanders – bass guitar, lead vocals
- Brent Hinds – guitar, lead vocals
- Bill Kelliher – guitar
