= Medium Rarities (Mastodon album) =

Compilation album by Mastodon
- Released: September 11, 2020
- Genre: Progressive metal, sludge metal
- Length: 70:46
- Label: Reprise

Mastodon chronology
Cold Dark Place (2017)	Medium Rarities (2020)	Hushed and Grim (2021)

Singles from Medium Rarities
- 1. "Fallen Torches" Released: July 31, 2020

Medium Rarities is a compilation album by American metal band Mastodon. It was released digitally and on limited edition vinyl on September 11, 2020 via Reprise Records. The album is a collection of rare tracks that include covers, instrumental versions of previous songs, and live recordings. Its opening track, a new song titled "Fallen Torches", was released on July 31, 2020. The song features Scott Kelly from Neurosis for his final guest appearance with Mastodon before his withdrawal from the public eye that was not announced until August 2022.

== Critical reception ==
Professional ratings
Review scores
Source	Rating
Kerrang!	4/5 stars
Louder	3/5 stars

In a positive review, Kerrang! stated the album "certainly underlines the band’s extraordinary ability to shape-shift" and highlighted the song "Fallen Torches" as a "heroic attempt to salvage 2020 via monolithic riffs and an outro thunderous enough to crack planets."

== Track listing ==
All tracks are written by Brann Dailor, Brent Hinds, Bill Kelliher, Troy Sanders except where noted.

No.	Title	Writer(s)	Additional information	Length
1.	"Fallen Torches"	Dailor, Hinds, Kelliher, Sanders, Scott Kelly	New song (2020)	4:22
2.	"A Commotion" (Feist cover)	Leslie Feist	A-side from Feistodon split single (2012)	4:14
3.	"Asleep in the Deep" (instrumental)		B-side from "Asleep in the Deep" single (2015)	6:12
4.	"Capillarian Crest" (live)		B-side from "The Wolf Is Loose" single (2006)	4:20
5.	"A Spoonful Weighs a Ton" (The Flaming Lips cover)	Wayne Coyne, Steven Drozd, Michael Ivins	B-side from The Flaming Lips / Mastodon split single (2012)	3:27
6.	"Toe to Toes" (instrumental)		B-side from "Toe to Toes" single (2017)	4:28
7.	"Circle of Cysquatch" (live)		Alternate B-side from "The Wolf Is Loose" single (2006)	3:15
8.	"Atlanta"	Dailor, Hinds, Kelliher, Sanders, Gibby Haynes	From the Adult Swim singles collection (2014)	3:25
9.	"Jaguar God" (instrumental)		Vocal version on Emperor of Sand (2017)	7:55
10.	"Cut You Up with a Linoleum Knife"	Dave Willis, Matt Maiellaro	From Aqua Teen Hunger Force Colon Movie Film for Theaters Colon the Soundtrack (2007)	1:50
11.	"Blood & Thunder" (live)		B-side from "Capillarian Crest" single (2006)	3:52
12.	"White Walker"		Original song from the Catch the Throne: Volume II mixtape (2015)	4:20
13.	"Halloween" (instrumental)		B-side from "The Motherload" single (2014)	4:38
14.	"Crystal Skull" (live)		Alternate B-side from "Capillarian Crest" single (2006)	3:25
15.	"Orion" (Metallica cover)	James Hetfield, Lars Ulrich, Cliff Burton	From the Remastered: Metallica's Master of Puppets Revisited compilation (2006)	8:15
16.	"Iron Tusk" (live)		B-side from "Colony Of Birchmen" single (2007)	2:48
Total length:				70:46

== Personnel ==
Mastodon

- Brann Dailor − drums, percussion, vocals
- Brent Hinds − guitars, vocals
- Bill Kelliher − guitars
- Troy Sanders − bass, vocals

Guest musicians

- Scott Kelly – additional vocals on "Fallen Torches"
- Isaiah "Ikey" Owens – synthesizer on "Asleep in the Deep"
- Gibby Haynes – vocals on "Atlanta"
- Mike Keneally – keyboards on "Jaguar God"

== Charts ==
Chart performance for Medium Rarities
Chart (2020)	Peak position
German Albums (Offizielle Top 100)	91
Hungarian Albums (MAHASZ)	14
Portuguese Albums (AFP)	35
Scottish Albums (OCC)	32
Swiss Albums (Schweizer Hitparade)	29
US Top Rock Albums (Billboard)	38
