= Once More 'Round the Sun =

Studio album by Mastodon
- Released: June 24, 2014
- Recorded: December 2013 – February 2014
- Studios: Rock Falcon, Franklin, Tennessee
- Genres: Stoner rock; progressive metal; hard rock; alternative metal
- Length: 54:08
- Label: Reprise
- Producer: Nick Raskulinecz

Mastodon chronology
Live at Brixton (2013)	Once More 'Round the Sun (2014)	Emperor of Sand (2017)

Singles from Once More 'Round the Sun
- 1. "High Road" Released: April 17, 2014; 2. "Chimes at Midnight" Released: June 3, 2014; 3. "The Motherload" Released: September 29, 2014; 4. "Asleep in the Deep" Released: June 19, 2015

Once More 'Round the Sun is the sixth studio album by American heavy metal band Mastodon. It was released on June 24, 2014, via Reprise Records. On April 17, 2014, Mastodon released the album's first single, "High Road". On June 16, 2014, the album was made available for streaming on iTunes. Once More 'Round the Sun sold around 34,000 copies in the United States in its first week of release to land at position No. 6 on the Billboard 200 chart, making it the band's highest-peaking album on the chart and their second consecutive Top 10 debut after their previous album, The Hunter, peaked at No. 10.

== Background ==
In late 2012, Mastodon guitarist Brent Hinds mentioned in an interview that he had begun writing material for the band's next release. The band continued writing and demoing their sixth studio album throughout 2013, while touring for their 2011 release The Hunter. The band began recording in late 2013 at Rock Falcon Studios in Franklin, Tennessee, with producer Nick Raskulinecz.

== Musical style ==
Troy Sanders stated in an interview that the album is a continuation where the band left off with their previous one, The Hunter.

Bill Kelliher stated also about the album's musical style: "We're always trying to surprise ourselves and write something that's new and fresh. It's definitely got the elements of The Hunter in there, but also [of] Remission and some heavier stuff. There's a lot of different influences, from Alice in Chains to Deftones. There's a lot of rock going on."

Brann Dailor stated following about the album: "It's gonna be massive and insane, lots of epic greatness. There will be lots of huge riffs and new directions. It's real weird, real "math-y", real straightforward. It's up, down and all around."

Kelliher also stated that the album's theme might be "death". He stated the following: "It always makes for really good story telling. It's kind of the theme that we have a lot in our music. We've had a lot of friends pass away since the last record. I'm not really sure yet. I think we're kind of focusing more about living on this earth and what would happen if this was your last year to live. I think that's sort of maybe a little bit of what we might be kind of touching on."

== Artwork ==
Oakland-based artist Skinner, who characterizes his work as "psychedelic nightmare paintings", created the album's artwork. Prior to its release, bassist and vocalist Troy Sanders stated: "It's going to be a work of art for sure. It's going to be very eye-opening. Very striking. It's from another dimension, and a lot of our music is geared toward that idea—taking you to another planet on songs. It's out there, and I think it's incredible."

== Critical response ==
Professional ratings
Aggregate scores
Source	Rating
Metacritic	78/100
Review scores
Source	Rating
AllMusic	3/5 stars
Consequence of Sound	B
The Guardian	4/5 stars
Pitchfork	6.3/10
PopMatters	8/10
Spin	8/10
Sputnikmusic	4.1/5

Once More 'Round the Sun was well received by contemporary music critics upon its initial release. At Metacritic, which assigns a normalized rating out of 100 to reviews from music critics, the album received an average score of 78, which indicates "generally favorable reviews", based on 30 reviews.

In the review for AllMusic, writer Thom Jurek wrote that "Once More 'Round the Sun furthers what Mastodon began on The Hunter: expanding their music past metal's rigid borders – toward an integrative sound that doesn't leave metal out." Michael Madden also praised the album in the review for Consequence of Sound, claiming that "Mastodon are starting to look more like that band's peers [Slayer], not disciples. Nick Raskulinecz's eternally crunchy production helps them reach those heights on Once More 'Round the Sun, and, as Oakland artist Skinner's cover suggests, the record is vibrant, too. There could be more structural risk-taking and the band could stand to have more grandiose moments, but, well, you know: consider them six for six." Dom Lawson spoke highly of the album in his review for The Guardian, writing that "Once More 'Round the Sun sounds very much like the album they need to make to edge a little further into the mainstream – it has a largely straightforward air and a tendency to favour the big hooks of 2011's The Hunter over the labyrinthine weirdness of 2009's Crack the Skye."

Giving the album an eight out of ten for PopMatters, Dean Brown felt that "when compared to the band's previous stratospheric evolutions, its substance may be just as important to the tale of Mastodon when the inevitable is written, hopefully decades into the future and many albums later from one of the best bands, regardless of genre, roaming the earth at present." Spin writer Johnathan Zwickel shared similar sentiments, claiming that "While the rest of heavy music's luminaries follow in their wake, Mastodon's sound – and their ambition – is bigger than metal."

Zoe Camp was more critical of the album in the review for Pitchfork, stating "it's possible to view Once More 'Round the Sun as a vow to honor their roots, even as they set out in search of broader horizons. So far, however, Mastodon's paradigms simply don't mesh the way they should. Evolution takes time, and Mastodon continue to publicly work out their growing pains as they determine which traits best represent the unified sound they've been chasing this decade."

=== Accolades ===
The album appeared on several album of the year lists published in 2014. Kerrang! ranked it as its 28th best album of the year, it appeared on Decibel magazine's end-of year list at #29 and on Terrorizer magazine's list at #35. Loudwire list the album as number 5 on their list of the 20 Best Metal Albums of 2014 and the song "Chimes at Midnight" at number 3 on their list of the 20 Best Metal Songs of 2014. Metalsucks ranked it as the 20th best metal album of the decade.

== Track listing ==
All lyrics and music by Mastodon, except additional lyrics on "Diamond in the Witch House" by Scott Kelly.

No.	Title	Vocals	Length
1.	"Tread Lightly"	Troy Sanders, Brann Dailor	5:14
2.	"The Motherload"	Dailor, Sanders	4:59
3.	"High Road"	Sanders, Dailor	4:15
4.	"Once More 'Round the Sun"	Brent Hinds, Sanders	2:58
5.	"Chimes at Midnight"	Sanders, Hinds	5:32
6.	"Asleep in the Deep" (featuring Valient Himself & Isaiah "Ikey" Owens)	Dailor, Hinds, Sanders, Valient Himself	6:12
7.	"Feast Your Eyes"	Sanders, Dailor	3:23
8.	"Aunt Lisa" (featuring The Coathangers & Gary Lindsey)	Dailor, Hinds, Gary Lindsey, The Coathangers	4:08
9.	"Ember City"	Sanders, Dailor	4:59
10.	"Halloween"	Hinds, Dailor	4:39
11.	"Diamond in the Witch House" (featuring Scott Kelly)	Scott Kelly, Sanders	7:49
Total length:			54:08

Note

- "Once More 'Round the Sun" contains samples from "Cowboy Song" written by Brian Downey and Phil Lynott

== Personnel ==
Mastodon

- Brann Dailor – drums, vocals
- Brent Hinds – lead guitar, vocals
- Bill Kelliher – rhythm guitar
- Troy Sanders – bass, vocals

Guest musicians

- Scott Kelly – vocals and additional lyrics on "Diamond in the Witch House"
- Gary Lindsey (chorus) & The Coathangers (ending) – additional vocals on "Aunt Lisa"
- Valient Himself – additional backing vocals on "Asleep in the Deep"
- Isaiah "Ikey" Owens – synthesizer on "Asleep in the Deep"

Production

- Nick Raskulinecz – producer, mixing
- Nathan Yarborough – recording engineer
- Jon Albritton – second engineer
- Tom Tapley – additional recording
- Ted Jensen – mastering
- Noah Landis – engineering on Scott Kelly vocals
- Norman Wonderly & Frank Maddocks – creative direction
- Skinner – illustration
- Donny Phillips – vector illustration and design

== Charts ==
=== Weekly charts ===
Chart (2014)	Peak position
Australian Albums (ARIA)	7
Austrian Albums (Ö3 Austria)	23
Belgian Albums (Ultratop Flanders)	14
Belgian Albums (Ultratop Wallonia)	46
Canadian Albums (Billboard)	4
Danish Albums (Hitlisten)	9
Dutch Albums (Album Top 100)	20
Finnish Albums (Suomen virallinen lista)	1
French Albums (SNEP)	50
German Albums (Offizielle Top 100)	16
Hungarian Albums (MAHASZ)	7
Irish Albums (IRMA)	8
Japanese Albums (Oricon)	103
New Zealand Albums (RMNZ)	10
Norwegian Albums (VG-lista)	4
Portuguese Albums (AFP)	21
Scottish Albums (Official Charts)	9
Swedish Albums (Sverigetopplistan)	17
Swiss Albums (Schweizer Hitparade)	13
UK Albums (Official Charts)	10
UK Rock & Metal Albums (OCC)	1
US Billboard 200	6
US Top Alternative Albums (Billboard)	1
US Top Rock Albums (Billboard)	1
US Top Hard Rock Albums (Billboard)	1
US Top Tastemakers (Billboard)	1

=== Year-end charts ===
Chart (2014)	Position
US Billboard Alternative Albums	48
US Billboard Hard Rock Albums	21
