= Steambreather =

Single by Mastodon

from the album Emperor of Sand
- Released: August 25, 2017
- Recorded: 2016
- Genre: Stoner metal
- Length: 5:03
- Label: Reprise

Mastodon singles chronology
"Show Yourself" (2017)	"Steambreather" (2017)	"Fallen Torches" (2020)

"Steambreather" is a song by American metal band Mastodon. It was the second single off of their album Emperor of Sand, the follow-up to first single "Show Yourself". As of October 2017, it had peaked at number 18 on the Billboard US Mainstream Rock Songs chart.

== Background ==
The song was released as the second single from band's studio album Emperor of Sand on August 25, 2017, despite the fact that the band had a new EP, Cold Dark Place, scheduled to release less than a month later. The music video for the song was released on the same day. The video involves two men who go to an event thinking it's a self-help seminar, only to find out its really an occult gathering. The two witness bizarre rituals that end up leaving people dead. Music journalists commonly took note of the video's weirdness, and compared the approach to that of their prior single, "Show Yourself", where the band pairs heavy, dark lyrical themes with more light-hearted, silly visuals. The video was created by Essy May and Stevie Gee and produced by Hugo Donkin from Blink Art.

== Themes and composition ==
Spin described the song as a "intricate metal mini-symphony".

== Personnel ==
- Brann Dailor − lead vocals, drums, percussion
- Troy Sanders − bass, vocals
- Brent Hinds − vocals, lead guitar
- Bill Kelliher − guitars

== Charts ==
Chart (2017)	Peak position
US Billboard (Mainstream Rock)	18
