= Hushed and Grim =

Studio album by Mastodon
- Released: October 29, 2021
- Studios: West End Sound, Atlanta
- Genres: Progressive metal; stoner metal; alternative metal
- Length: 86:17
- Label: Reprise
- Producer: David Bottrill

Mastodon chronology
Medium Rarities (2020)	Hushed and Grim (2021)	Marrow Deep (2026)

Singles from Hushed and Grim
- 1. "Pushing the Tides" Released: September 10, 2021; 2. "Teardrinker" Released: October 1, 2021; 3. "Sickle and Peace" Released: October 20, 2021; 4. "More Than I Could Chew" Released: July 12, 2022

Hushed and Grim is the eighth studio album by American heavy metal band Mastodon, released on October 29, 2021 through Reprise Records, their final release on the label. A double album, it is the band's last album with founding guitarist Brent Hinds before his departure from the band in March 2025 and his death five months later.

Critical reception was positive, and the album sold well globally. The album also serves as a tribute to Mastodon's former manager Nick John, who died from cancer in 2018. Guest appearances include former Soundgarden guitarist Kim Thayil and bassist Troy Sanders' mother Jody on French horn. It is the band's first album since their 2002 debut Remission to not feature guest vocals from Neurosis's Scott Kelly.

== Background ==
The band's first double album, rhythm guitarist Bill Kelliher described Hushed and Grim as "our proggiest". Drummer-vocalist Brann Dailor said that at least one verse in every song is dedicated to Nick John, the band's longtime manager who died of pancreatic cancer in 2018.

The album artwork was made by Paul Romano and inspired by the sacred Yggdrasil tree from Norse cosmology. Dailor said that the spirit of the deceased "goes into the heart of a tree and then experiences all the pillars of your in successions of the seasons that the tree experiences." John is depicted as the man in the center of the tree.

Hushed and Grim is Mastodon's first album since their 2002 debut Remission to not feature a guest appearance from Neurosis vocalist Scott Kelly. At the time, Kelly took a leave of absence from the public, but he admitted a year later that he retired from the music industry after admitting to violence against his family.

After Hinds' death, bassist-vocalist Troy Sanders said that Hushed and Grim and Mastodon's live performances in support of the album featured "the weakest band solidity and performance that we had had in a decade" because of Hinds' inebriation.

== Critical reception ==
Professional ratings
Aggregate scores
Source	Rating
Metacritic	82/100
Review scores
Source	Rating
AllMusic	4.5/5 stars
Blabbermouth	10/10
Clash	9/10
Consequence	B+
Distorted Sound	10/10
Exclaim!	9/10
Metal Hammer	4.5/5
Pitchfork	5.7/10
Rolling Stone	4/5 stars
Sputnikmusic	4.5/5

Hushed and Grim was well received, with review aggregator Metacritic indicating "universal acclaim" with a score of 82/100 based on 13 reviews. AllMusic critic Thom Jurek wrote that the album's tracks are "rendered with abundant creativity, massive power, and searing honesty." Rolling Stone commented that "Hushed and Grim never stops giving, and the album’s energy, depth, and power make it a completely unique addition to the band’s mammoth catalog." In an outlying review, however, Chris O'Connell of Pitchfork called the album "an inoffensive, occasionally alluring, but overwhelmingly dull 90-minute slog."

=== Accolades ===
Publication	Accolade	Rank
Consequence	Top 30 Metal & Hard Rock Albums	8
Guitar World	The 20 Best Guitar Albums of 2021	8
Kerrang!	The 50 Best Albums of 2021	12
Loudwire	The 45 Best Rock + Metal Albums of 2021	20
Metal Hammer	Top 10 Prog Metal Albums of 2021	2
PopMatters	The 75 Best Albums of 2021	62
PopMatters	The 10 Best Progressive Rock/Metal Albums of 2021	3
Prog	Top 20 Albums of 2021	7
Revolver	Top 25 Albums of 2021	7
Rolling Stone	The 10 Best Metal Albums of 2021	2
Spin	The 30 Best Albums of 2021	12
Sputnikmusic	Top 50 Albums of 2021	1
Ultimate Classic Rock	Top 40 Best Albums of 2021	30
Ultimate Classic Rock	Top 10 Hard Rock and Metal Albums of 2021	8
Loudwire	The 35 Best Metal Songs of 2021 ("Teardrinker")	27

== Track listing ==
All tracks are written by Mastodon.

Disc one
No.	Title	Lead vocals	Length
1.	"Pain with an Anchor"	Brann Dailor, Troy Sanders	5:01
2.	"The Crux"	Sanders	4:59
3.	"Sickle and Peace"	Sanders, Dailor	6:17
4.	"More Than I Could Chew"	Dailor, Sanders	6:51
5.	"The Beast"	Brent Hinds, Dailor, Sanders	6:03
6.	"Skeleton of Splendor"	Sanders, Dailor	5:04
7.	"Teardrinker"	Dailor, Sanders	5:20
8.	"Pushing the Tides"	Sanders, Dailor	3:29
Total length:			43:04

Disc two
No.	Title	Lead vocals	Length
1.	"Peace and Tranquility"	Hinds, Dailor, Sanders	5:55
2.	"Dagger"	Sanders	5:12
3.	"Had It All"	Sanders	5:25
4.	"Savage Lands"	Dailor, Sanders	4:24
5.	"Gobblers of Dregs"	Sanders, Dailor	8:34
6.	"Eyes of Serpents"	Sanders, Dailor	6:49
7.	"Gigantium"	Dailor, Sanders	6:54
Total length:			43:13

== Personnel ==
Mastodon

- Brann Dailor – drums, vocals
- Brent Hinds – lead guitar, vocals
- Bill Kelliher – rhythm guitar
- Troy Sanders – bass, vocals

Additional musicians

- João Nogueira – keyboards
- Darby Rose Tapley – intro vocals (3)
- Marcus King – solo guitar (5)
- Dave Witte – percussion (10)
- Rich Doucette – sarangi (10)
- Jody Sanders – French horn (11)
- Kim Thayil – solo guitar (11)
- Kevin Fox – cello, string arrangement (15)
- Drew Jurecka – viola, violin (15)

Technical

- David Bottrill – production, mixing
- Ryan McCambridge – engineering
- Tom Tapley – recording
- Billy Joe Bowers – editing
- Miles Landrum – recording assistance
- Braden Griffith – additional engineering (5)
- Nathan Yaccino – additional engineering (11)
- Ted Jensen – mastering

== Charts ==
Chart performance for Hushed and Grim
Chart (2021)	Peak position
Australian Albums (ARIA)	16
Austrian Albums (Ö3 Austria)	7
Belgian Albums (Ultratop Flanders)	17
Belgian Albums (Ultratop Wallonia)	19
Canadian Albums (Billboard)	18
Danish Albums (Hitlisten)	24
Dutch Albums (Album Top 100)	16
Finnish Albums (Suomen virallinen lista)	4
French Albums (SNEP)	32
German Albums (Offizielle Top 100)	10
Hungarian Albums (MAHASZ)	6
Irish Albums (Official Charts)	27
Italian Albums (FIMI)	53
New Zealand Albums (RMNZ)	29
Norwegian Albums (VG-lista)	10
Polish Albums (ZPAV)	35
Portuguese Albums (AFP)	9
Scottish Albums (Official Charts)	10
Spanish Albums (PROMUSICAE)	24
Swedish Albums (Sverigetopplistan)	25
Swiss Albums (Schweizer Hitparade)	7
UK Albums (Official Charts)	14
UK Progressive Albums (Official Charts)	2
UK Rock & Metal Albums (Official Charts)	1
US Billboard 200	20
US Top Hard Rock Albums (Billboard)	1
US Top Rock Albums (Billboard)	2

=== Year-end charts ===
Year-end chart performance for "Hushed and Grim"
Chart (2021)	Position
Hungarian Albums (MAHASZ)	88
