= The Devil You Know (The Coathangers album) =

Studio album by The Coathangers
- Released: March 8, 2019
- Genre: Punk rock
- Length: 31:11
- Label: Suicide Squeeze
- Producer: Nic Jodoin

The Coathangers chronology
Nosebleed Weekend (2016)	The Devil You Know (2019)

Professional ratings
Review scores
Source	Rating
MusicOMH	4/5 stars
Paste	8.1/10
Vice (Expert Witness)	A−

The Devil You Know is the sixth studio album by American punk rock band The Coathangers. It was released on March 8, 2019, on Suicide Squeeze Records, and is available as a digital download, on CD, cassette and three different kinds of colored vinyl (one only available at live shows).

== Track listing ==
No.	Title	Length
1.	"Bimbo"	2:46
2.	"5 Farms"	2:31
3.	"Crimson Telephone"	3:09
4.	"Hey Buddy"	2:56
5.	"Step Back"	2:38
6.	"Stranger Danger"	2:45
7.	"F the NRA"	2:35
8.	"Memories"	2:48
9.	"Last Call"	3:21
10.	"Stasher"	2:16
11.	"Lithium"	3:26
Total length:		31:11

== Personnel ==
The Coathangers

- Julia Kugel-Montoya (Crook Kid Coathanger) – guitar, vocals
- Meredith Franco (Minnie Coathanger) – bass, vocals
- Stephanie Luke (Rusty Coathanger) – drums, vocals

Additional personnel

- Ian Franco – Saxophone on "Memories"
- Nic Jodoin – Engineer, producer, mixing
- Travis Pavur – Additional engineering
- Yochanan Austin – Additional engineering
- Joe Laporta – Mastering
- Matt Odom – Photos, design
- Scott Montoya – Design

== Charts ==
Chart	Peak position
US Independent Albums (Billboard)	12
US Top Album Sales (Billboard)	66
US Vinyl Albums (Billboard)	3
