= The Motherload =

Single by Mastodon

from the album Once More 'Round the Sun
- Released: September 29, 2014
- Recorded: Rock Falcon Studios, Franklin, Tennessee
- Genre: Alternative metal; hard rock; progressive metal
- Length: 4:59
- Label: Reprise
- Songwriters: Brann Dailor, Brent Hinds, Bill Kelliher, Troy Sanders
- Producer: Nick Raskulinecz

Mastodon singles chronology
"Chimes at Midnight" (2014)	"The Motherload" (2014)	"Show Yourself" (2017)

"The Motherload" is a song by the American heavy metal band Mastodon, released as the third and final single from the band's sixth studio album, Once More 'Round the Sun (2014).

== Music video ==
The song's music video shows several women twerking in front of a group of men inter-cut with footage of the band performing the song. During the solo, the women start dancing in front of the band. Another woman enters and as she dances, psychedelic images appear, with the others cheering her on. They all begin dancing again as the song ends.

=== Controversy ===
The video caused some controversy as it featured many women twerking. Dom Lawson of The Guardian criticized the video, calling it "blatant, idiotic and utterly pointless sexism."

Brann Dailor defended the video, saying it was meant to be a parody of "esoteric", "creepy" '90s rock and metal videos and the videos for Nicki Minaj's "Anaconda", Taylor Swift's "Shake It Off" and Iggy Azalea's "Booty". The video was also meant as an homage to the band's hometown, Atlanta, which was one of the cities pivotal to early hip hop music. One of the dancers in the video, Jade, defended it, saying "it's not a satirical video, but rather one with an inclusive message."

The video received a positive response from publications such as The Huffington Post and The Independent.

== Track listing ==
Digital single

No.	Title	Length
1.	"The Motherload"	4:59

12" single

Side A
No.	Title	Length
1.	"The Motherload"	4:59

Side B
No.	Title	Length
1.	"Halloween" (instrumental)	4:39

== Chart positions ==
Chart (2014)	Peak position
US Main. Rock	24
MEX. Air	43

== Personnel ==
- Troy Sanders – bass, lead vocals (refrain)
- Brent Hinds – lead guitar
- Brann Dailor – drums, lead vocals (verses and chorus)
- Bill Kelliher – rhythm guitar
