= High Road (Mastodon song) =

Single by Mastodon

from the album Once More 'Round the Sun
- Released: April 17, 2014
- Recorded: Rock Falcon Studios, Franklin, Tennessee
- Genre: Progressive metal; sludge metal
- Length: 4:15
- Label: Reprise
- Songwriter: Troy Sanders
- Producer: Nick Raskulinecz

Mastodon singles chronology
"Dry Bone Valley" (2012)	"High Road" (2014)	"Chimes at Midnight" (2014)

"High Road" is a song by the American heavy metal band Mastodon, released as the debut single from their sixth studio album, Once More 'Round the Sun (2014). The song was nominated for a Grammy Award for Best Metal Performance, but lost to Tenacious D's cover of Dio's "The Last in Line."

== Composition ==
"High Road" is the heaviest song on Once More 'Round the Sun, but is still more melodic than the band's previous work. J.F. Williams of Angry Metal Guy described its sound as "prog-sludge Foo Fighters."

== Music video ==
The song's official music video was uploaded to the band's YouTube channel on June 11, 2014. The video was directed by Roboshobo.

The video begins with a teenage boy watching two scantly dressed women play a game of chess, while he sits on a throne. As the two women are about to kiss, the boy wakes up and is handed a lunch by his grandmother, who is carrying around an oxygen tank. The boy leaves his house, while receiving a dirty look from his neighbor across the street. The boy is then shown playing the Pathfinder Roleplaying Game with his grandma, before giving her her nightly medicine. The boy goes to a park to play a live version of D&D, where his team promptly loses. The opposing team shows up to his house, burning an effigy of his character. The neighbor from before puts out the fire and shows the boy his garage and helps him get "in shape". The boy returns to the park and wins this time, but is attacked by the same boys from earlier. The neighbor shows up and fends off the attackers; as the video ends both the boy and neighbor are shown lying on the ground.

== Track listing ==
1. "High Road" – 4:15

== Chart positions ==
Weekly chart performance for "High Road"
Chart (2014)	Peak position
US Hot Singles Sales (Billboard)	1
US Mainstream Rock (Billboard)	24
Mexico Airplay (Monitor Latino)	41

== Personnel ==
- Troy Sanders – lead vocals, bass guitar
- Brent Hinds – guitar, chorus backing vocals
- Bill Kelliher – guitar, chorus backing vocals (live)
- Brann Dailor – lead vocals, drums
