= March of the Fire Ants EP =

EP by Mastodon
- Released: November 18, 2003
- Recorded: 2001–2003
- Genre: Progressive metal; sludge metal
- Label: Relapse
- Producer: Matt Bayles; Mastodon

Mastodon chronology
Remission (2002)	March of the Fire Ants EP (2003)	Leviathan (2004)

Mastodon singles chronology
"March of the Fire Ants" (2003)	"Iron Tusk" (2004)

March of the Fire Ants EP is a promotional EP by American heavy metal band Mastodon. The song "March of the Fire Ants" is the second track of the band's debut studio album, Remission (2002).

== Music video ==
A music video was created for the title track, with filming taking place in the band's hometown of Atlanta and was directed by Chad Rullman.

== Track listing ==
All tracks are written by Mastodon, except where noted.

No.	Title	Writer(s)	Length
1.	"March of the Fire Ants" (edit)		3:39
2.	"March of the Fire Ants" (album version)		4:27
3.	"Emerald" (Thin Lizzy cover)	Phil Lynott, Brian Robertson, Brian Downey, Scott Gorham	3:49
4.	"Crusher Destroyer" (album version)		2:00
5.	"Where Strides the Behemoth" (live)		3:07

== Other appearances ==
"March of the Fire Ants" appeared on the MTV2 Headbangers Ball compilation and a split 7-inch with High on Fire. The cover of Thin Lizzy's "Emerald" was released on the deluxe edition of Remission and a split 7-inch with American Heritage. "Crusher Destroyer" was featured in the skateboarding game Tony Hawk's Underground. The live version of "Where Strides the Behemoth" was recorded during the Relapse Records Contamination Festival on January 18, 2003 at the Trocadero Theatre in Philadelphia.

== Personnel ==
Mastodon

- Troy Sanders – bass, vocals
- Brann Dailor – drums
- Bill Kelliher – guitar
- Brent Hinds – guitar, vocals
