= Emperor of Sand =

Studio album by Mastodon
- Released: March 31, 2017
- Recorded: October–December 2016
- Studios: The Quarry Recording in Kennesaw, Georgia; Henson Recording in Los Angeles
- Genres: Progressive metal; stoner rock; alternative metal; hard rock
- Length: 51:11
- Labels: Reprise; Warner Bros.
- Producer: Brendan O'Brien

Mastodon chronology
Once More 'Round the Sun (2014)	Emperor of Sand (2017)	Cold Dark Place (2017)

Singles from Emperor of Sand
- 1. "Show Yourself" Released: February 3, 2017; 2. "Steambreather" Released: August 25, 2017

Emperor of Sand is the seventh studio album by American heavy metal band Mastodon. It was released on March 31, 2017 through record label Reprise Records. The album's first single, "Show Yourself", peaked at number 4 on the US Billboard Mainstream Rock Songs chart in 2017. The second single, "Steambreather", peaked at number 18 on the same chart. It was ranked on several year-end lists, including at number three on The Independent's "Top 20 Rock & Metal Albums of 2017".

== Background ==
Emperor of Sand is Mastodon's seventh studio album. The album was recorded at the Quarry in Kennesaw, Georgia and mixed at Henson Recording Studios in Los Angeles. The band worked with record producer Brendan O'Brien, with whom they collaborated on their 2009 album Crack the Skye. The songs were recorded as originally arranged, then they revisited each track to edit and refine the sound. Drummer Brann Dailor completed his drum tracks and began drafting lyrics while guitars and bass were being recorded by other band members.

Scott Kelly of Neurosis and Kevin Sharp of Brutal Truth both appear as guest vocalists on "Scorpion Breath" and "Andromeda" respectively. Kelly appeared as a guest vocalist on every Mastodon studio album from Leviathan (2004) to the compilation Medium Rarities (2020).

== Concept and lyrical themes ==
The concept and story in Emperor of Sand follows a desert wanderer who has been handed a death sentence. Themes of death and survival are woven into the songs' lyrics, which were inspired by experiences members of the band had when family and friends were recently diagnosed with cancer.

"At the end of the story, the person simultaneously dies and is saved," Dailor said. "It's about going through cancer, going through chemotherapy and all the things associated with that. I didn't want to be literal about it. But it's all in there. You can read between the lines."

"We're reflecting on mortality," bassist and vocalist Troy Sanders said in a statement. "To that end, the album ties into our entire discography. It's 17 years in the making, but it's also a direct reaction to the last two years. We tend to draw inspiration from very real things in our lives."

== Release ==
Emperor of Sand was released on March 31, 2017 through record label Reprise. A snippet of "Sultan's Curse" was previewed on the band's website on January 25, 2017, and the full track was released on January 27. The album's first single, "Show Yourself", was released in February 2017. Its second single, "Steambreather", was released in August 2017.

Following the album's release, the band embarked on a tour in the United States from April 14 to May 20, 2017, with support from Eagles of Death Metal and Russian Circles.

== Critical reception ==
Professional ratings
Aggregate scores
Source	Rating
Metacritic	78/100
Review scores
Source	Rating
AllMusic	4/5 stars
Consequence of Sound	B
Exclaim!	8/10
The Guardian	3/5 stars
NME	(4/5)
Pitchfork	7.6/10
PopMatters	7/10 stars
Rock Sound	8/10
Rolling Stone	3.5/5 stars
Sputnikmusic	4.5/5

Emperor of Sand was well-received by contemporary music critics upon its initial release. At Metacritic, which assigns a normalized rating out of 100 to reviews from mainstream publications, the album received an average score of 78, based on 24 reviews, indicating "generally favorable reviews".

Amongst the more positive articles was Calum Slingerland's review for Exclaim!. In it, Slingerland stated that "Drawing as much from their past as well as their present, Mastodon refuse to go extinct just shy of two decades of music-making. Emperor of Sand is at once emotionally powerful and musically arresting." Anita Bhagwandas was also highly positive in a four-star review for NME, saying "Metal needed this album. It needed a record that's doomy, heavy and magnificently multilayered, and Mastodon's seventh album is exactly that." Reviewing that album for Consequence of Sound, Katherine Turman wrote "From the incendiary solos of 'Word to the Wise' to the evocatively personal/universal lyrics ('The throne of maladies/It's right in front of me/Your malignancy'), Emperor of Sand proves cathartic for the listener and, hopefully, for the band members as well." Rob Sayce wrote the review for Rock Sound suggesting that "Few bands out there twist metal into such bewildering, bewitching shapes, and – somehow – there’s little sign of their well running dry."

In the review for AllMusic, critic Thom Jurek was more critical of the album, claiming "Emperor of Sand is not perfect; it doesn't attain the glories of the first trilogy. That said, it's easily on par with The Hunter and stronger than Once More 'Round the Sun, while being more diverse than any record they've cut. Arguments about quality should go beyond the aesthetics to embody process and honesty, which are what ultimately matters. In order to be true to themselves, Mastodon had to make Emperor of Sand at this time. There was no other option. As such, its urgency, sophistication, and emotional heft make it a necessary entry in their catalog." Jordan Blum of PopMatters similarly concluded that "Emperor of Sand is by no means a bad album, but there's little here that the band hasn't already explored." Contributor Saby Reyes-Kulkarni wrote the review for Pitchfork declaring "Mastodon haven't gone past the point of no return in pursuit of accessibility. If anything, Emperor of Sand proves the opposite. Musicians often rationalize losing their edge by talking about 'maturity'. Mastodon can now feel free to use the word without lying to their fanbase."

=== Accolades ===
Year-end rankings

Publication	Accolade	Rank
Exclaim!	Top 10 Metal and Hardcore Albums of 2017	7
Loudwire	25 Best Metal Albums of 2017	2
Metal Hammer	100 Best Metal Albums of 2017	1
Revolver	20 Best Albums of 2017	3
Rolling Stone	20 Best Metal Albums of 2017	4

In 2018, the first track of the album, "Sultan's Curse", won the Grammy Award for Best Metal Performance. The album was nominated for Best Rock Album, but lost to The War on Drugs' A Deeper Understanding.

Decade-end rankings

Publication	Accolade	Rank
Louder Sound	The 50 Best Metal Albums of the 2010s	15
Loudwire	The 66 Best Metal Albums of the Decade	13

== Commercial performance ==
The album sold around 43,000 copies in the United States in its first week of release, debuting at No. 7 on the Billboard 200; this bettered the first-week sales of Crack the Skye, which debuted at No. 11 with 41,000 copies sold.

== Track listing ==
All tracks are written by Mastodon.

No.	Title	Lead vocals	Length
1.	"Sultan's Curse"	Troy Sanders, Brent Hinds, Brann Dailor	4:09
2.	"Show Yourself"	Dailor, Sanders	3:03
3.	"Precious Stones"	Hinds, Sanders	3:46
4.	"Steambreather"	Dailor, Hinds	5:03
5.	"Roots Remain" (titled "Eons" on the vinyl version)	Sanders, Dailor, Hinds	6:28
6.	"Word to the Wise"	Sanders, Dailor	4:00
7.	"Ancient Kingdom"	Dailor, Sanders, Hinds	4:54
8.	"Clandestiny"	Sanders, Hinds, Dailor	4:28
9.	"Andromeda" (featuring Kevin Sharp)	Sanders, Dailor, Kevin Sharp	4:05
10.	"Scorpion Breath" (featuring Scott Kelly)	Sanders, Scott Kelly	3:19
11.	"Jaguar God" (featuring Mike Keneally)	Hinds, Dailor, Sanders	7:56
Total length:			51:11

== Personnel ==
Mastodon

- Brann Dailor – drums, percussion, vocals, keyboards, bass on "Jaguar God" Intro
- Brent Hinds – lead guitar, vocals
- Bill Kelliher – rhythm guitar, synth guitar on "Clandestiny"
- Troy Sanders – bass, vocals, bass pedals on "Roots Remain", "Ancient Kingdom" and "Jaguar God"

Guest musicians

- Scott Kelly – vocals on "Scorpion Breath"
- Kevin Sharp – vocals on "Andromeda"
- Mike Keneally – keyboards on "Jaguar God"

Production

- Brendan O'Brien – production, mixing
- Tom Syrowski – mixing, recording
- Tom Tapley – recording
- T.J. Elias – second engineer
- Bryan Dimaio – second engineer
- Billy Joe Bowers – mastering, editing
- Ivy Skoff – production coordination

Artwork

- Brann Dailor – art direction
- Alan "Medusawolf" Brown – illustration artwork
- Donny Phillips – album design for KIHL Studio

== Charts ==
=== Weekly charts ===
Chart (2017)	Peak position
Australian Albums (ARIA)	3
Austrian Albums (Ö3 Austria)	11
Belgian Albums (Ultratop Flanders)	12
Belgian Albums (Ultratop Wallonia)	26
Canadian Albums (Billboard)	4
Dutch Albums (Album Top 100)	16
Finnish Albums (Suomen virallinen lista)	4
French Albums (SNEP)	60
German Albums (Offizielle Top 100)	11
Hungarian Albums (MAHASZ)	7
Irish Albums (IRMA)	7
Italian Albums (FIMI)	42
New Zealand Albums (RMNZ)	9
Norwegian Albums (VG-lista)	6
Polish Albums (ZPAV)	27
Portuguese Albums (AFP)	10
Scottish Albums (Official Charts)	6
Spanish Albums (Promusicae)	18
Swedish Albums (Sverigetopplistan)	5
Swiss Albums (Schweizer Hitparade)	13
UK Albums (Official Charts)	11
UK Album Downloads (Official Charts)	13
UK Progressive Albums (Official Charts)	2
UK Rock & Metal Albums (Official Charts)	1
US Billboard 200	7
US Top Alternative Albums (Billboard)	1
US Top Rock Albums (Billboard)	1
US Top Hard Rock Albums (Billboard)	1
US Top Tastemakers (Billboard)	1

=== Year-end charts ===
Chart (2017)	Position
Belgian Albums (Ultratop Flanders)	177
US Top Rock Albums (Billboard)	75
