= Discography (disambiguation) =

Discography is the study and cataloging of sound recordings.

Discography may also refer to:

- Lumbar provocative discography, a medical procedure on intervertebral discs

Albums

- Discography (Jesuit album)
- Discography (Jill Johnson album), 2003
- Discography '93–'99, by Lethargy
- Discography: The Complete Singles Collection, by the Pet Shop Boys
