= Cold Dark Place =

- Cover art by Richey Beckett

EP by Mastodon
- Released: September 22, 2017
- Recorded: 2014 and 2016
- Genres: Progressive rock; stoner rock; hard rock
- Length: 21:50
- Label: Reprise
- Producers: Nick Raskulinecz and Brendan O'Brien

Mastodon chronology
Emperor of Sand (2017)	Cold Dark Place (2017)	Medium Rarities (2020)

Professional ratings
Aggregate scores
Source	Rating
Metacritic	74/100
Review scores
Source	Rating
AllMusic	3/5 stars
Kerrang!	4/5 stars
The Line of Best Fit	8/10 stars
Pitchfork	7.0/10
Read Junk	3/5 stars
Spin	8/10 stars

Cold Dark Place is an EP by American metal band Mastodon. It was released digitally and on CD on September 22, 2017, via Reprise Records, and a limited-edition ten-inch vinyl followed on October 27. Three of the tracks were recorded during the recording sessions of 2014's Once More 'Round the Sun, while "Toe to Toes" was recorded during the recording sessions of 2017's Emperor of Sand.

With a softer sound than any of Mastodon's prior releases, Cold Dark Place has been described as progressive rock, stoner rock and hard rock.

== Track listing ==
All tracks are written by Mastodon.

No.	Title	Length
1.	"North Side Star"	6:10
2.	"Blue Walsh"	5:10
3.	"Toe to Toes"	4:30
4.	"Cold Dark Place"	6:00
Total length:		21:50

== Personnel ==
- Brann Dailor − drums, percussion, vocals, claps (track 3)
- Brent Hinds − lead guitar, vocals, lap-steel, claps (track 3)
- Bill Kelliher − rhythm guitar, claps (track 3)
- Troy Sanders − bass, vocals, claps (track 3)
- Nick Raskulinecz − production (tracks 1, 2, and 4)
- Brendan O'Brien − production (track 3)

== Charts ==
Chart (2017)	Peak position
Austrian Albums (Ö3 Austria)	36
Canadian Albums (Billboard)	43
Hungarian Albums (MAHASZ)	30
Portuguese Albums (AFP)	18
Swiss Albums (Schweizer Hitparade)	44
US Billboard 200	42
US Top Hard Rock Albums (Billboard)	4
US Top Rock Albums (Billboard)	7
