= Jonah Hex: Revenge Gets Ugly EP =

Soundtrack album (EP) by Mastodon
- Released: June 29, 2010
- Recorded: Late 2009 and early 2010
- Genres: Progressive metal; sludge metal; stoner metal
- Length: 32:46
- Label: Reprise
- Producer: George Drakoulias

Mastodon chronology
Crack the Skye (2009)	Jonah Hex: Revenge Gets Ugly EP (2010)	Live at the Aragon (2011)

Professional ratings
Review scores
Source	Rating
AllMusic	3/5 stars
Beats Per Minute	52/100
Decibel	9/10
MetalSucks	1/5 stars
Theprp.com	3/5 stars

Jonah Hex: Revenge Gets Ugly EP (also called Jonah Hex: Music From The Motion Picture) is the official score for the 2010 superhero film Jonah Hex directed by Jimmy Hayward and starring Josh Brolin. It was composed by American heavy metal band Mastodon and film composer Marco Beltrami. It was released digitally on June 29, 2010, through Reprise Records.

Jonah Hex: Revenge Gets Ugly EP received some minor charting success, peaking at number 15 on Billboard's Top Soundtracks, and at number 22 on Billboard's Hard Rock Albums.

== History ==
Heavy metal band Mastodon worked on the film score to the DC comic adaption of Jonah Hex. While writing the film script, director Jimmy Hayward (Horton Hears a Who!, Finding Nemo, Toy Story) was heavily inspired and influenced by the band's 2006 studio album, Blood Mountain. Hayward personally called Mastodon and asked them to contribute their music to the soundtrack. The film was on a tight budget and most of the cast and crew had agreed to take pay cuts. Mastodon were no exception as they agreed to record the album for "basically nothing".

Mastodon had just returned from a European tour with Metallica, and immediately flew out to Los Angeles, California, to begin work on the score. The group was shown various clips of the film and asked to write music that matched the scenes emotionally. According to bassist Troy Sanders, they were given "100% creative control in this movie". Writing the soundtrack to a film came naturally for Mastodon, as many of their albums are concept albums. Sanders commented that since the start of the band, "we've always written albums thinking the music was the score of a movie. Then we'll create the lyrics or story line on top of that, as if we're writing the dialogue to match the movie's cinematography". In two weeks they created about an hour of instrumental music, with five full songs and "many smaller musical themes adapted throughout". The soundtrack was then handed over to composer John Powell (Bourne series, Jumper, Hancock) to add the music into the film.

After the soundtrack had been recorded, the Jonah Hex film endured lengthy reshoots and reediting sessions. Prior to signing onto Jonah Hex, Powell was already arranged to compose the soundtracks for Knight and Day and Fair Game. Due to his previously arranged agreements, and filming for Jonah Hex still incomplete, Powell had to leave the project and was subsequently replaced with composer Marco Beltrami (The Hurt Locker, 3:10 to Yuma, Scream series). The first soundtrack Mastodon recorded was written for scenes that were later scrapped during the reshoots, so Beltrami had the band write an entirely new score. The new soundtrack was taken in a "more restrained, subtle" musical direction—contrasting the original version which had been described as "pretty heavy" with "vigorous shredding".

While Mastodon had originally described the process of composing a soundtrack as "very pure, it was real creative and totally spur of the moment" and expected "nothing in return but satisfaction in being a part of something incredible", the band found it frustrating to have to rewrite a new score and start from scratch. According to guitarist Brent Hinds, who was disappointed about having to start over: "It was some of the best shit I've ever written in my life. Now I'm just trying to finish with as much patience as possible". The band was also facing time constraints both from the approaching release date of the film and also being on a world tour at the time. Mastodon later announced they had about an hour's worth of newly recorded material for the score.

Jonah Hex: Revenge Gets Ugly EP was digitally released as a six-song EP on June 29, 2010 through Reprise Records, two weeks after the Jonah Hex film's debut. The album features four new songs and two alternate versions.

== Track listing ==
All tracks are written by Mastodon and Marco Beltrami.

No.	Title	Length
1.	"Death March"	8:52
2.	"Clayton Boys"	3:12
3.	"Indian Theme"	4:10
4.	"Train Assault"	4:13
5.	"Death March" (Alternate Version)	9:07
6.	"Clayton Boys" (Alternate Version)	3:12
Total length:		32:46

== Personnel ==
Mastodon

- Brann Dailor – drums
- Brent Hinds – guitar
- Bill Kelliher – guitar
- Troy Sanders – bass guitar

Additional personnel

- Marco Beltrami – composer
- George Drakoulias – producer
