= Core Atoms =

American musician and visual artist

- Origin: Rochester, New York, U.S.
- Genres: Progressive rock, synth-metal, experimental rock
- Occupations: Musician, songwriter
- Instruments: Guitar, keyboards, synthesizers, vocals
- Years active: 1995–present

Core Atoms is an American musician and songwriter known for his work in progressive and experimental rock. He is a founding member of the synth-metal band Arcadea and the bands Gaylord and Zruda. A multi-instrumentalist, Atoms is known for his unconventional guitar technique—playing a right-handed guitar left-handed and upside down —and for his experimental songwriting, which blends genres and explores shifting time signatures. He is also noted for his synthesizer arrangements and lyrical themes rooted in science fiction and narrative-driven concepts.

== Early life and career ==
Atoms is originally from Rochester, New York. At age 18, he co-founded the progressive funk rock trio Gaylord, known for its fusion of funk, metal, jazz and classical music. His distinctive guitar style contributed to the group's eclectic sound and local recognition.

== Gaylord (1995–2009) ==
Gaylord was a three-piece progressive rock band active from 1995 to 2009, founded by guitarist Core Atoms and bassist Jeff Steverson. Drummer Brann Dailor, who later co-founded Mastodon, joined in 1996. Following the departure of Dailor and several subsequent drummers, percussionist Drew Verstraete joined the band in 2000 and remained through its later years. The band released several recordings, including Tsunami (2005), and Resplendent Locution (2007), before disbanding around 2010. Afterward, Atoms and Verstraete formed the progressive metal quartet Zruda.

== Zruda ==
In the early 2010s, Atoms and Verstraete co-founded Zruda, a progressive metal quartet based in Atlanta, Georgia and featuring members of Lazer/Wulf.

== Arcadea ==
In 2015, Atoms formed the synth-driven progressive rock project Arcadea with Brann Dailor (Mastodon) and Raheem Amlani. The band's self-titled debut album, released in 2017 by Relapse Records, is a concept work set five billion years in the future, thematically centered on synthetic life and cosmic evolution. On the album, Atoms performed exclusively on synthesizers and keyboards, omitting guitar to emphasize the band's futuristic, science fiction-inspired sound. A visual artist as well, Atoms is credited with creating the official videos for “Gas Giant,” “Army of Electrons,” and “Through the Eye of Pisces.”

In July 2025, Relapse Records released “Fuzzy Planet”, the first single from Arcadea's second album, The Exodus of Gravity, scheduled for release on August 22, 2025. The Exodus of Gravity features Atoms’ distinctive science fiction themes and lyrics. He contributed as a multi-instrumentalist and songwriter, performing on synthesizers, guitars, bass, Moog Taurus pedals, Mellotron, Hammond organ, theremin, and samples. The album features founding member Brann Dailor on lead vocals, drums, and percussion, and introduces keyboardist João Nogueira.

== Musical style and influences ==
Atoms' musical style combines elements of progressive and experimental rock, characterized by complex compositions and a blending of genres. His self-taught guitar technique—playing a standard right-handed guitar left-handed and upside down—contributes to his unconventional chord voicings and phrasing. Atoms' work with Arcadea features science fiction themes and conceptual narratives within a synth-driven progressive rock style. By contrast, his earlier band Gaylord incorporated funk, metal, and jazz influences, with lyrics spanning satire, social, and political commentary.

Atoms' musical influences include 1970s progressive rock, funk, classical music, electronic music, heavy metal, punk, and jazz. He has cited artists such as Stevie Wonder, Rush, Charles Mingus, and Beethoven as inspirations.

== Selected Discography ==
=== With Gaylord ===
- Tsunami (studio album, 2005)
- Resplendent Locution (studio album, 2007)

=== With Zruda ===
- Zruda (EP, 2011)

=== With Arcadea ===
- Arcadea (studio album, 2017)
- The Exodus of Gravity (studio album, 2025)
