= Oblivion (Mastodon song) =

Single by Mastodon

from the album Crack the Skye
- Released: February 16, 2009
- Recorded: Southern Tracks Studios in Atlanta, Georgia
- Genre: Progressive metal
- Length: 5:46
- Label: Reprise
- Songwriters: Brann Dailor, Brent Hinds, Bill Kelliher, Troy Sanders
- Producer: Brendan O'Brien

Mastodon singles chronology
"Divinations" (2009)	"Oblivion" (2009)	"Black Tongue" (2011)

"Oblivion" is a song by American progressive metal band Mastodon, released on February 16, 2009 as the second single from their fourth studio album Crack the Skye.

It was the first Mastodon song to feature three vocalists, with drummer Brann Dailor joining bassist Troy Sanders and guitarist Brent Hinds. The song peaked at No. 30 on the Billboard Mainstream Rock chart.

== Background ==
Bassist Troy Sanders and guitarist Brent Hinds had traditionally split vocalist duties in Mastodon. Drummer Brann Dailor would contribute vocal tracks in the studio to be used as templates for Sanders and Hinds' final recordings. The verses were supposed to be sung by Sanders. Producer Brendan O'Brien was opposed to Dailor's vocals opening the song especially as he had never sung on an album before, but he was eventually convinced.

On "Oblivion", Dailor sings the verses, Sanders sings the pre-chorus and Hinds sings the chorus. Dailor admitted that having three vocalists on the same song "annoys people because they can’t tell where the vocals are coming from".

Crack the Skye was influenced by the suicide of Dailor's 14-year-old sister Skye. In "Oblivion", the lyric "I tried to bore a hole into the ground, breaking all the fingers and the nails from my hand", as sung by Dailor, is about when he was tripping on LSD at his sister's grave, attempting to dig down to her coffin using his bare hands.

On the band's 2026 tour, Mastodon played "Oblivion" live for the first time since 2019, with John Baizley of Baroness performing Hinds's parts.

== Music video ==
The music video alternates between clips of the band playing in a wasteland, and clips of each member on a space station, aptly named 'Skyelab'. They seem to be trying to repair the space station. Dailor is outside the station, frozen and not wearing his helmet at the beginning of the video, with Sanders attempting to retrieve him with a mechanical arm. Eventually, Sanders gives up and Hinds is given the task to effect repairs to the space station. While he is outside, he begins to see strange lights, which are also noticed by Kelliher. Hinds takes off his helmet and is killed instantly, while Kelliher exits through the airlock and also dies. Sanders dons a space suit to continue the repairs, but stops to look at the others who have fallen as the video ends.

The video won the Best Video title at the 2009 Kerrang! Awards. According to Brann Dailor, the video was influenced by Stanley Kubrick's science fiction film 2001: A Space Odyssey.

== Charts ==
Weekly chart performance for "Oblivion"
Chart (2009)	Peak position
US Hot Singles Sales (Billboard)	16
US Rock & Alternative Airplay (Billboard)	29
US Mainstream Rock (Billboard)	30

== Personnel ==
Mastodon

- Brann Dailor – drums, vocals
- Troy Sanders – bass guitar, vocals
- Brent Hinds – guitar, vocals
- Bill Kelliher – guitar

== Other appearances ==
An instrumental version of "Oblivion" appears on the PC, Xbox 360 and PlayStation 3 video game, Brütal Legend.
