= Gaylord (band) =

American rock band

- Origin: Rochester, New York, U.S.
- Genres: Progressive rock; progressive metal; alternative rock
- Years active: 1995–2010
- Labels: Jeffcore Records
- Past members: Core Atoms; Jeff Steverson; Brann Dailor; Drew Verstraete

Gaylord was an American rock band active from late 1995 until 2010.

== History ==
Gaylord was founded in 1995 in Rochester, New York, by guitarist/ singer/songwriter Core Atoms (Arcadea, Zruda) and bassist/singer/songwriter Jeff Steverson. In 1996, Gaylord released their first recording Sparkling Cool, following the addition of drummer Brann Dailor. After Dailor, Gaylord would play with two other drummers before the addition of percussionist/singer Drew Verstraete (Big Hair, Zruda) in late 1998 After the addition of Verstraete, Gaylord went on to release several recordings including the full length self-released, Drop a Bomb on a Town of Fried Bologna (2001), Tsunami (2004) and Resplendent Locution (2007).

In 2007, Gaylord recorded Resplendent Locution with Doug White at Watchmen Recording Studios before relocating to Atlanta, Georgia. In March 2008, a month before Gaylord left for Atlanta, they recorded a one-hour live performance for the WXXI television series On Stage. In December 2009, Gaylord disbanded, and Atoms and Verstraete founded the progressive metal band Zruda with Guitarist Bryan Aiken and bassist Sean Peiffer of the Athens, Georgia-based prog-metal band Lazer Wulf. In 2016, Atoms and Dailor reunited to create the Progressive Synth Metal band Arcadea, releasing their self-entitled debut in June 2017 on Relapse Records.

== Musical style and influences ==
Gaylord embraced an eclectic mix of styles which one reviewer described as, "a raucous blend of prog, metal, and funk with heavy traces of classical." In an interview for the newspaper Flagpole, Core Atoms accredited Gaylord's sound to a shared, "love of everything from metal to classical to funk and bluegrass." Their distinct sound was further aided by Atoms' unconventional style of playing a right-handed guitar, left-handed—essentially backwards and upside-down, and Steverson's complex style of bass playing, which combined slapping, strumming, plucking, and tapping. In a 2017 interview for Revolver Magazine, Dailor said:

"Gaylord's bass player, Jeff [Steverson] was crazy too. I thought they were super talented, and it was different from what I was doing at the time...Gaylord were playing weird funk, also influenced by Mr. Bungle. We had all this different music wrapped up in this one really bizarre package. Core's guitar playing was just different, and that's what I always look for: something artistic and weird."

== Discography ==
- Sparkling Cool (1996)
- Rootbeer & Mayonnaise (1998)
- Drop a Bomb on a Town of Fried Bologna (2000)
- The Password (2002)
- Tsunami (2004)
- Gayest Hits (2006)
- Resplendent Locution (2007)
