= Suck My Shirt =

Studio album by The Coathangers
- Released: March 18, 2014
- Genres: Punk rock; garage rock
- Length: 37:43
- Label: Suicide Squeeze

The Coathangers chronology
Larceny & Old Lace (2011)	Suck My Shirt (2014)	Nosebleed Weekend (2016)

Suck My Shirt is the fourth studio album by American punk rock band The Coathangers. It was released on Suicide Squeeze Records on March 18, 2014, to generally favorable reviews. Mark Deming of AllMusic writes, 'their approach to songcraft has matured and tightened up quite a bit, and the departure of keyboard player Candice Jones has turned this group into a leaner and meaner three piece.'

Professional ratings
Aggregate scores
Source	Rating
Metacritic	(71/100)
Review scores
Source	Rating
AllMusic	3.5/5 stars
Consequence of Sound	C+
Cuepoint (Expert Witness)	A–
Drowned in Sound	(8/10)
Paste	7.0/10
Pitchfork Media	7.2/10

== Track listing ==
No.	Title	Length
1.	"Follow Me"	3:52
2.	"Shut Up"	2:10
3.	"Springfield Cannonball"	2:45
4.	"Merry Go Round"	3:20
5.	"Love Em and Leave Em"	3:30
6.	"Zombie"	4:30
7.	"Smother"	2:57
8.	"Dead Battery"	2:28
9.	"Adderall"	3:42
10.	"Derek's Song"	2:43
11.	"I Wait"	2:01
12.	"Drive"	3:45
Total length:		37:43

== Personnel ==
- Julia Kugel (Crook Kid Coathanger) – Guitar, vocals
- Stephanie Luke (Rusty Coathanger) – Drums, vocals
- Meredith Franco (Minnie Coathanger) – Bass guitar, vocals
- Jenny – Photography
- Justin McNeight – Engineer
- Scott Montoya – Design, layout
- Ed Rawls – Engineer
- Ryan Russell – Back cover photo, cover photo
- Roger Seibel – Mastering
