= The Coathangers =

American punk rock/garage band

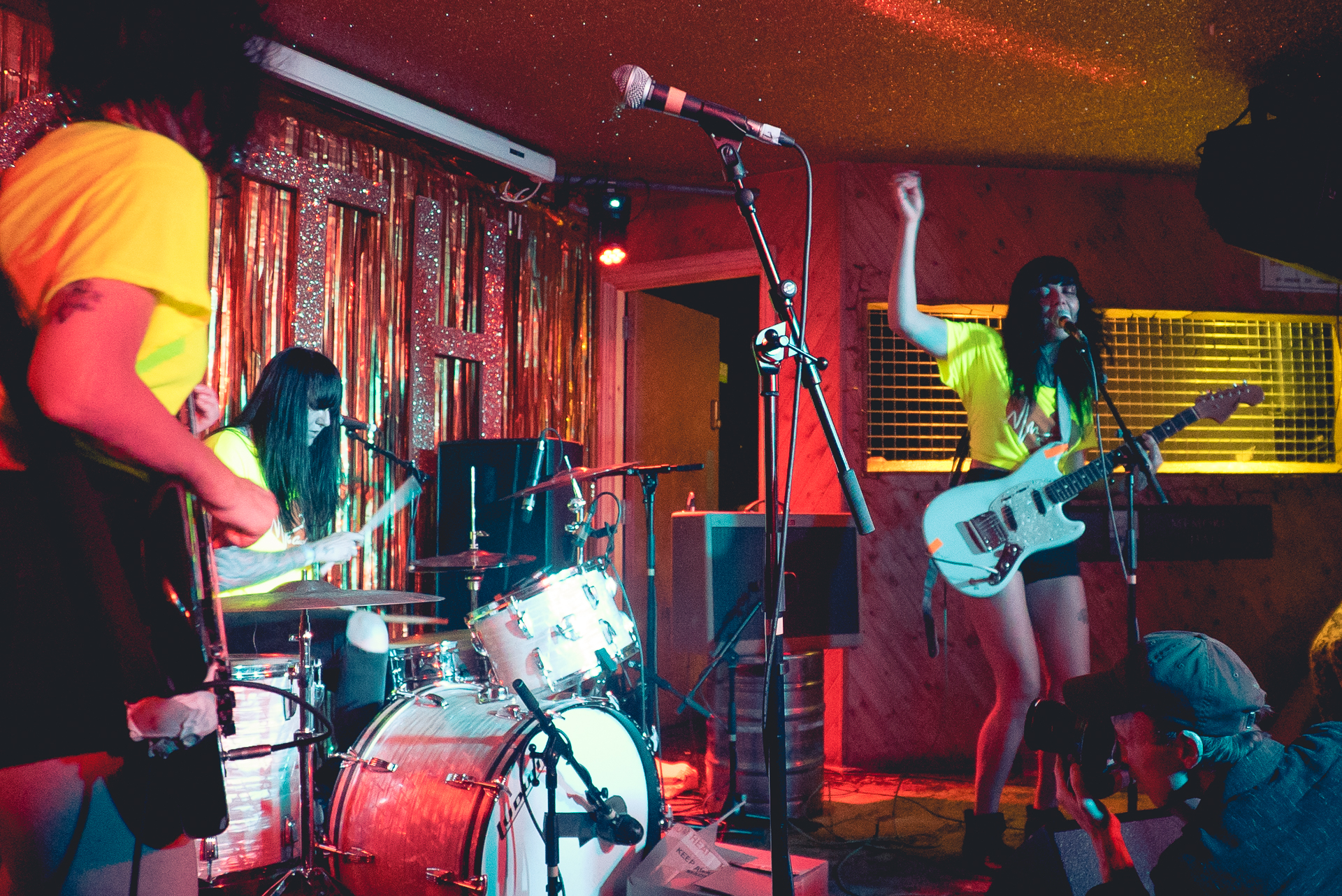

Background information
- Origin: Atlanta, Georgia, United States
- Genres: Punk rock, garage punk, indie rock
- Years active: 2006–present
- Label: Suicide Squeeze Records
- Members: Julia Kugel-Montoya; Meredith Franco; Stephanie Luke
- Past members: Candice Jones
- Website: thecoathangers.com

The Coathangers are an American all-female punk rock/garage band from Atlanta, Georgia featuring singer/guitarist Julia Kugel-Montoya (Crook Kid Coathanger), bassist Meredith Franco (Minnie Coathanger) and singer/drummer Stephanie Luke (Rusty Coathanger).

Formed in 2006, the band chose the name "Coathangers" which refers to a dangerous method of self-induced abortion; all of the band's members are pro-choice. Long-time keyboardist Candice Jones (Bebe Coathanger), left the band amicably in 2013.

The band was asked to open for the Hiss on the strength of their performance playing a house show. Since then they have headlined shows in the United States and abroad. In addition, several times they have appeared as the support act for fellow Atlanta band Black Lips's New York City concerts.

== History ==
The band released a 7-inch record on Atlanta’s Die Slaughterhaus label and their first full length self-titled album on Rob's House Records. After touring and putting out a second single on Seattle based Suicide Squeeze Records, the Coathangers released their second full length Scramble in April 2009.

In 2011 their third album, Larceny & Old Lace was released (also on Suicide Squeeze), to generally positive reviews.

In 2012, Julia Kugel released a solo 7-inch single, "Where Did You Go" (Suicide Squeeze Records) under the name White Woods. A second single, "Big Talking", was released the following year.

March 2014 saw the release of the band's fourth full-length album entitled Suck My Shirt, for Suicide Squeeze Records. The most critically and commercially well received to date, the band embarked on tour dates supporting fellow Atlantans the Black Lips on the heels of the release, and continued on through 2014 with festival appearances and headline dates. Also in 2014 the band provided backing vocals for "Aunt Lisa", a track on the Atlanta metal band Mastodon's album Once More 'Round the Sun.

On April 15, 2016 the band released their fifth studio full-length entitled Nosebleed Weekend. Nosebleed Weekend debuted at #149 on the Nielsen Soundscan Top 200 sales charts (and #6 on the Top New Artist Albums and #4 on the Alternative New Artist Albums chart). Among the press highlights of the release were two separate appearances on Last Call with Carson Daly. The band quickly hit the road with the seminal punk band Refused for a tour of the U.S. in May and June 2016, and toured heavily throughout 2017 in support of the album.

On June 30, 2017, The Coathangers released Parasite EP on Suicide Squeeze Records. The five-track EP includes an alternate version of "Down Down" from the band's 2016 album Nosebleed Weekend.

Suicide Squeeze Records released The Coathangers first official live album, aptlty titled Live, on June 1, 2018. The album was released on cassette and on black/red/white tri-colored vinyl, limited to 1500 copies.

During 2018, in between touring, the band worked on their 6th studio album at Valentine Studios in Hollywood, California. The album was later revealed to be titled The Devil You Know, and was released on March 8, 2019. The album was produced, recorded and mixed by Nic Jodoin, who produced the band's previous album, Nosebleed Weekend.

In a 2025 interview with New Noise Magazine regarding a resurfaced Coathangers demo, Julia Kugel explained that the band were unlikely to put out anything soon, saying, "It’s hard to get everyone together because we all live in different states now. So it’s hard to get everyone on the same page. We were going to work on some things, but then if we did, I think it would take forever just to get everyone on the same page."

== Members ==
Current members

- Julia Kugel-Montoya – guitar, vocals (2006–present)

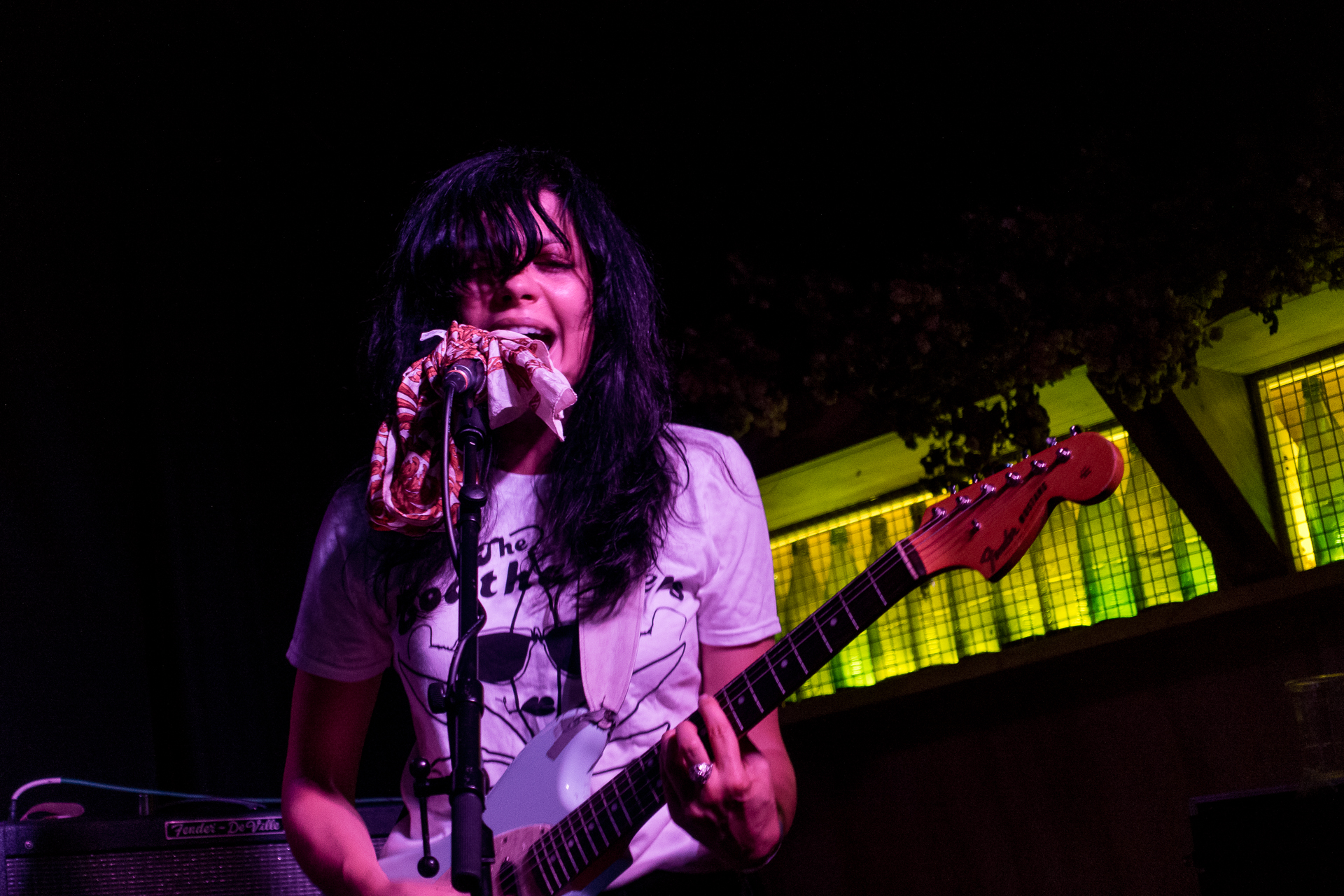

- Meredith Franco – bass, vocals (2006–present)

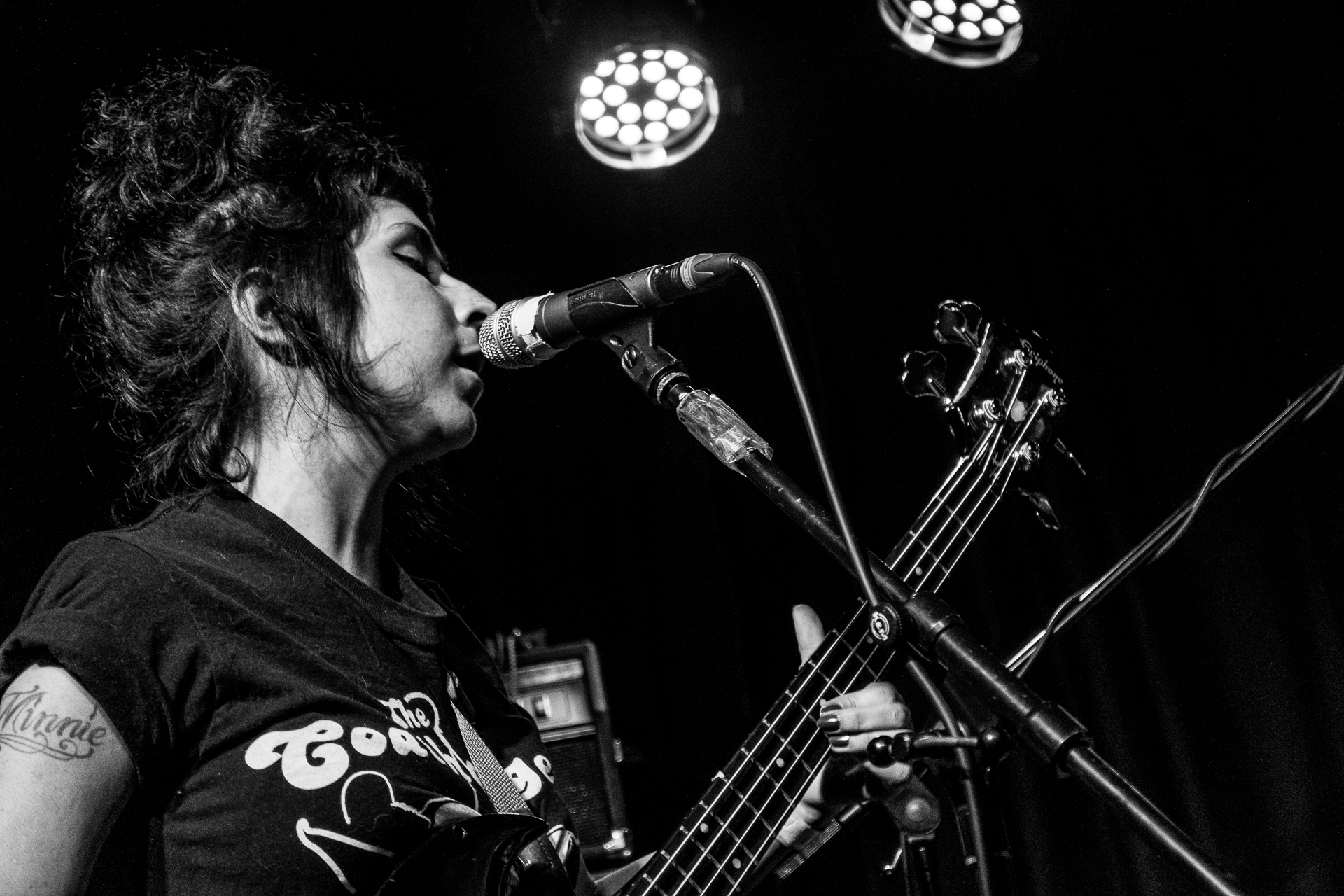

- Stephanie Luke – drums, vocals (2006–present)

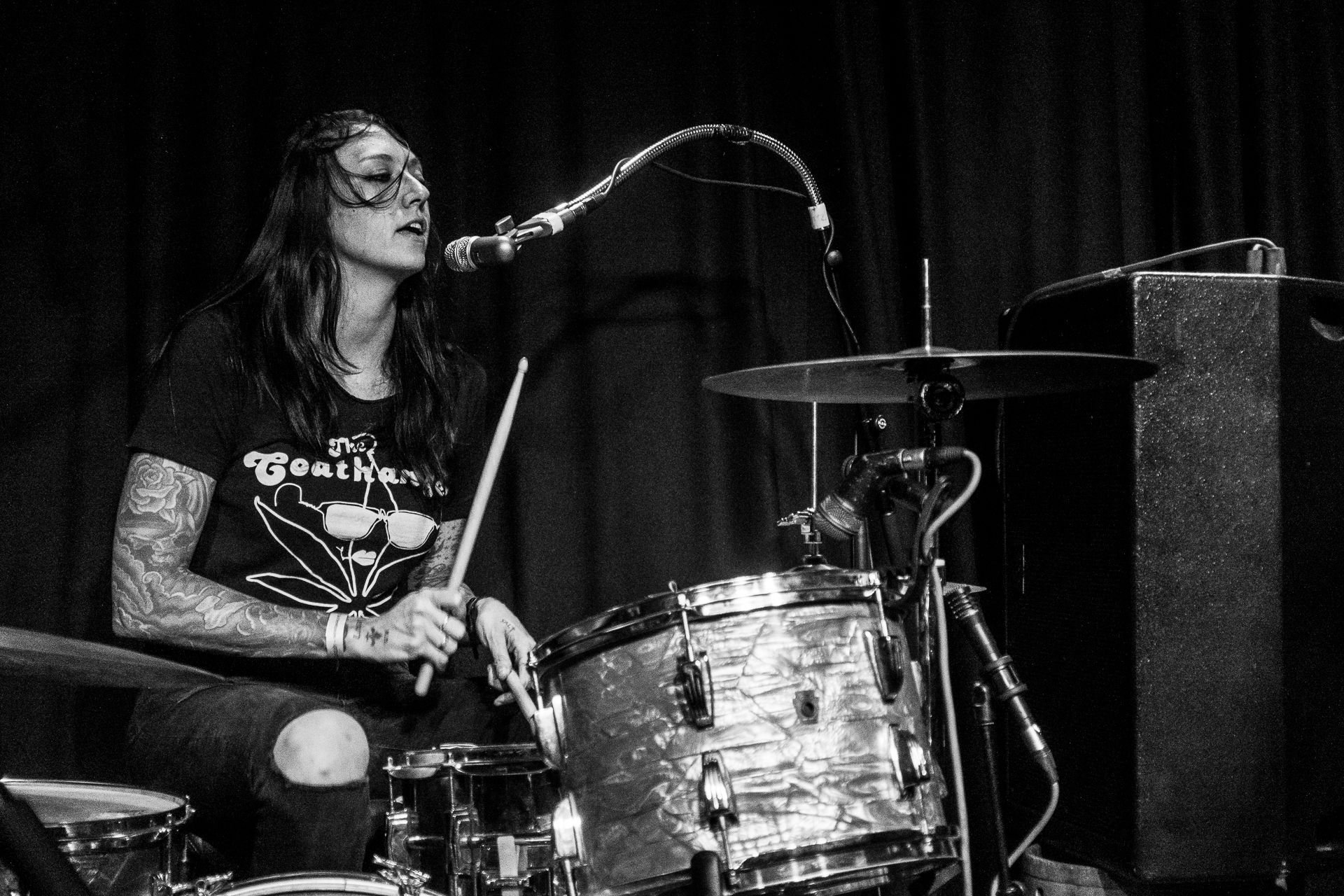

Former members

- Candice Jones – keyboards, vocals (2006–2013)

Timeline

== Discography ==
=== Albums ===
- The Coathangers (Rob's House Records/Die Slaughterhaus, 2007)
- Scramble (Suicide Squeeze Records, 2009)
- Larceny & Old Lace (Suicide Squeeze Records, 2011)
- Suck My Shirt (Suicide Squeeze Records, 2014)
- Nosebleed Weekend (Suicide Squeeze Records, 2016)
- The Devil You Know (Suicide Squeeze Records, 2019)

=== Live albums ===
- Live (Suicide Squeeze Records, 2018)

=== Singles ===
- "Shake Shake" b/w "Dreamboat" (Suicide Squeeze, 2008)
- "143" b/w "Arthritis Sux" (Suicide Squeeze, 2010)
- "Haterade" b/w "Wreckless Boy" (The Earl Live Series #2, 2010) Recorded live at The Earl on February 20, 2008. Hand numbered, limited pressing of 500.
- "Hurricane" b/w "Johnny" (X-Ray Recordings, 2011) Clear flexi-disc. Hand numbered, limited pressing of 300.
- "Watch Your Back" b/w "Perfume" (Smack Face, 2016) Sold at gigs in New Zealand and Australia 2016. 200 copies made available by mail order in the U.S. by Suicide Squeeze Records.

=== Split Singles ===
- "Johnny" b/w "Wife Eyes" by Hard Candy (Die Slaughterhaus, 2010)
- "Chicken: 30" b/w "Strawberry Dreams" by The Numerators (Suicide Squeeze, 2010) Limited Edition of 500.
- "Merry Go Round" b/w "Toasted" by Heavy Cream (Suicide Squeeze, 2012)
- "Smother" b/w "No Crees Que Ya Cansa" by Davila 666 (Suicide Squeezes, 2012)
- "Derek's Song" b/w "Throw" by Nü Sensae (Suicide Squeeze, 2013)
- "Adderall" b/w "Earthbot" by Audacity (band) (Suicide Squeeze, 2013)
- "Sex Beat" b/w "Energy Drink And The Long Walk Home" by These Arms Are Snakes (Suicide Squeeze, 2013) Limited to 1,000 copies on clear vinyl with black and red splatter.
- "Watch Your Back" b/w "Freedom Fries" by Black Lips (Suicide Squeeze, 2015)

=== EPs ===
- "Whirlyball" 9 song EP (self released, 2007) CD-R released in a green felt sewn sleeve with an insert.
- "Never Wanted You Back" 4 song EP (Die Slaughterhaus, 2007) Recorded live at Nickel & Dime Studios.
- "Parasite" 5 song EP (Suicide Squeeze, 2017)

=== Julia Kugel-Montoya (solo singles) as White Woods ===
- "Where Did You Go" b/w "Paper Cutout" (Suicide Squeeze, 2012) 7-inch vinyl
- "Big Talking" b/w "Corner Town" (Suicide Squeeze, 2013) 7-inch vinyl

=== Julia Kugel-Montoya (solo album) as Julia, Julia ===
- "Derealization" (Suicide Squeeze, 2022)

== Guest appearances ==
- Mastodon, Once More 'Round the Sun (track "Aunt Lisa") (Warner Music, 2014)
