= Scramble (album) =

Studio album by the Coathangers
- Released: April 7, 2009
- Genres: Indie rock, post-punk revival
- Length: 33:46
- Label: Suicide Squeeze

The Coathangers chronology
The Coathangers (2007)	Scramble (2009)	Larceny & Old Lace (2011)

Scramble is the second album by American punk rock band the Coathangers. It was released on April 7, 2009, on Suicide Squeeze Records.

== Critical reception ==
Scramble received mostly favorable reviews from critics. One such review was written by Robert Christgau, who described the album's music as "postpunk in the angular Gof4 tradition that femme bands long ago realized left room to squeeze high voices in edgewise." An exception to this trend was Chris Parkin, who wrote in NME that "these four grrrls from Atlanta will send more people off cliff-faces with their yelping, hysterical art-punk than they ever will into HMV to buy this." Another mixed review was written by Matthew Fiander, who wrote in PopMatters that "Scramble is a very solid record, but if anything it shows us the Coathangers’ talents have outgrown their humble garage sound."

Professional ratings
Aggregate scores
Source	Rating
Metacritic	(71/100)
Review scores
Source	Rating
AllMusic	(favorable)
NME	2.5/5 stars
Paste	(7.3/10)
Pitchfork Media	(7.2/10)
PopMatters	6/10 stars
Robert Christgau	A–
Tiny Mix Tapes	(3.5/5)

== Track listing ==
No.	Title	Length
1.	"Intro"	0:05
2.	"Toomerhead"	2:39
3.	"Stop Stomp Stompin’"	2:36
4.	"Time Passing"	3:10
5.	"Bury Me"	2:28
6.	"Dreamboat"	3:08
7.	"Pussywillow"	3:48
8.	"Gettin’ Mad and Pumpin’ Iron"	2:05
9.	"Killdozer"	2:17
10.	"143"	2:23
11.	"Arthritis Sux"	1:51
12.	"Sonic You"	2:50
13.	"Bobby Knows Best"	1:40
14.	"Cheap Cheap"	2:29
15.	"Outro"	0:16
Total length:		33:46

== Personnel ==
- Julie Kugel (Crook Kid Coathanger) – Guitar, vocals
- Stephanie Luke (Rusty Coathanger) – Drums, vocals
- Meredith Franco (Minnie Coathanger) – Bass guitar, vocals
- Candice Jones (Bebe Coathanger) – Keyboard, vocals
