= Discography '93–'99 =

Discography '93-'99

Compilation album by Lethargy
- Released: 2000
- Recorded: 1993–1999
- Genre: Mathcore

Discography '93–'99 is a career-spanning compilation of tracks by Lethargy, a Rochester, New York-based mathcore band.

== Track listing ==
=== Disc one ===
1. Subtle (3:29)
2. Stitch (3:43)
3. Little Man (2:59)
4. Image Tool (4:32)
5. Grope (4:10)
6. Careborne (3:19)
7. Humor Me (3:37)
8. Create (4:09)
9. Spill (5:44)
10. Erased (3:10)
11. Medley (7:32)
12. Spineless (4:14)
13. Thread (5:10)
14. Among (3:38)
15. Humorless (6:24)

=== Disc two ===
1. Intro / Lost in This Existence (4:54)
2. The Entombment (3:50)
3. Among the Dead I Lie (4:13)
4. The Persistent Unknown (2:38)
5. Grieve into the Eyes that Bleed (5:14)
6. Intro / Tainted (3:33)
7. Sane (2:29)
8. Soil (2:36)
9. All Things End (3:47)
10. Distraught (3:51)
11. Humor Me (3:44)
12. Create (4:21)
13. A Moment Away (4:42)
14. Breathing You (4:59)
15. Thread (5:25)
16. Jabba" (2:22)
17. Lost "Unplugged" (4:32)

=== Notes ===
- Disc one, tracks 1–3 were previously unreleased and were recorded in 1999.
- Disc one, track 4 was taken from Watchmen Studios: The Compilation, released in 1997.
- Disc one, track 5 was taken from Watchmen Studios: The Compilation Vol. 2, released in 1998.
- Disc one, tracks 6–15 make up the album It's Hard to Write with a Little Hand, released in 1996.
- Disc two, tracks 1–5 make up the Lost in This Existence demo, recorded in 1993.
- Disc two, tracks 6–10 make up the Tainted demo, recorded in 1994.
- Disc two, tracks 11–16 make up the Humor Me, You Funny Little Man (The Red Tape) demo, recorded in 1995.
- Disc two, track 17 was taken from 7-inch split with Big Hair, released in 1994.
