= Larceny & Old Lace =

Studio album by The Coathangers
- Released: June 7, 2011
- Genre: Punk rock
- Length: 37:43
- Label: Suicide Squeeze

The Coathangers chronology
Scramble (2009)	Larceny & Old Lace (2011)	Suck My Shirt (2014)

Professional ratings
Review scores
Source	Rating
Pitchfork	7.6/10
Drowned in Sound	8/10
Consequence	B
The A.V. Club	B
The Skinny	2/5 stars
Scene Point Blank	8.2/10

Larceny & Old Lace is the third studio album by American punk rock band The Coathangers. It was released on Suicide Squeeze Records on June 7, 2011.

== Track listing ==
No.	Title	Length
1.	"Hurricane"	2:32
2.	"Trailer Park Boneyard"	3:29
3.	"Go Away"	3:00
4.	"Sicker"	3:06
5.	"Call to Nothing"	2:29
6.	"Jaybird"	2:48
7.	"Johnny"	2:28
8.	"My Baby"	2:40
9.	"Chicken: 30"	2:28
10.	"Well Alright"	2:53
11.	"Tabbacco Rd."	2:27
Total length:		30:20

== Personnel ==
- Julia Kugel (Crook Kid Coathanger) – Guitar, vocals
- Stephanie Luke (Rusty Coathanger) – Drums, vocals
- Meredith Franco (Minnie Coathanger) – Bass guitar, vocals
- Candice Jones (Bebe Coathanger) – Keyboards, vocals
- Ed Rawls – Recording, mixing, mastering
- Justin McNeight – Recording, mixing, mastering
