= Arcadea =

American metal band

- Origin: Atlanta, Georgia, U.S.
- Genres: Synth-metal, progressive metal
- Years active: 2015–present
- Label: Relapse
- Spinoff of: Mastodon, Gaylord
- Members: Core Atoms; Brann Dailor; João Nogueira
- Past members: Raheem Amlani

Arcadea is an American synth-metal supergroup from Atlanta, formed in 2015 by Mastodon drummer Brann Dailor, and Gaylord guitarist Core Atoms. Arcadea has released two albums on Relapse Records: their self-titled debut, Arcadea, in June 2017, and their follow-up The Exodus of Gravity, in August 2025.

== History ==
Arcadea was founded in 2015, by upside-down guitarist Core Atoms and drummer Brann Dailor in Atlanta, Georgia. Arcadea is the second music collaboration between Rochester, New York natives Atoms and Dailor, who played in the progressive funk trio Gaylord, in the late 1990s. With the addition of guitarist Raheem Amlani, the three-piece began recording tracks at Amlani's Orange Peel Studios in Atlanta in 2015. The result was an 11-song sci-fi concept album which was released on Relapse Records on June 16, 2017. Set approximately five billion years in the future, the album explores a post-human universe inhabited by celestial entities imbued with human-like emotions and consciousness. The album was mastered by the American Grammy Award-winning engineer Colin Leonard and includes cover art by British fantasy artist Essy May. As part of the album's promotion, Relapse Records released several animated music videos, with Core Atoms credited for creating the official videos for "Gas Giant," "Army of Electrons," and "Through the Eye of Pisces." The song "Through the Eye of Pisces" was featured in an ident for the British free-to-air TV channel E4, titled "Cult," which first aired in October 2018. The ident was created by British sci-fi artist Essy May, who also designed the cover artwork for the album.

In July 2025, Relapse Records released the official music video for "Fuzzy Planet", the first single from Arcadea's second album, The Exodus of Gravity, which was released on August 22, 2025. The Exodus of Gravity features founding members Brann Dailor on lead vocals, drums, and percussion and Core Atoms—who also serves as the primary songwriter—on synthesizers, guitars, bass, Moog Taurus pedals, Mellotron, Hammond organ, theremin, and samples. The album also marks the departure of Raheem Amlani and the introduction of keyboardist João Nogueira.

== Musical style and influences ==
For Dailor and Atoms, Arcadea was a departure from previous music projects in both concept and sound. While Atoms is known for his unique guitar playing style, Arcadea's premier album features no guitars—both Atoms and Amlani play only keyboards and synthesizers. For Dailor, it was an opportunity to sing lead vocals on the majority of songs in addition to drums. In an interview for Prog-Sphere Atoms explains, "Since we all have our own bands with more traditional instrumentation, we wanted to do something different but still rooted in our love of prog." Both Dailor and Atoms credit Stevie Wonder, early Genesis, and other 70s progressive rock as influences for Arcadea. Dailor elaborated in a 2017 interview with Revolver magazine, noting his fascination with early synth-based music: "Some of my favorite stuff from the bigger prog groups out there, like Genesis, are the synth moments. I wanted to make an album that sounded like those moments."

== Discography ==
- Arcadea (2017)
- The Exodus of Gravity (2025)

== See also ==
- Mastodon
- Gaylord
