= Lethargy (band) =

American metal band

- Origin: Rochester, New York, U.S.
- Genres: Technical death metal, mathcore
- Years active: 1992–1999
- Label: Spoth
- Past members: Erik Burke; Brann Dailor; Bill Kelliher; Adam Routier; Brian Steltz; Stephan Nedwetzky

Lethargy was an American technical death metal and mathcore band formed in Rochester, New York by vocalist Erik Burke, drummer Brann Dailor, and bassist Adam Routier. They would create their first demo titled Lost in This Existence in 1993. Bill Kelliher would join the band as a guitarist in 1994 replacing Stephan Nedwetzky and Brian Steltz. The band would create two more demos titled Tainted and Humor Me, You Funny Little Man. Their last performance was on Christmas night of 1999. Drummer Brann Dailor and guitarist Bill Kelliher would later appear in Today Is the Day and Mastodon. Guitarist and vocalist Erik Burke is currently active in Nuclear Assault, Sulaco, Kalibas, Brutal Truth, and B.C.T. (Blatant Crap Taste).

== Members ==
=== Last-known lineup ===
- Erik Burke − lead guitar, vocals
- Brann Dailor − drums
- Bill Kelliher − guitar (1994–1999)
- Adam Routier − bass

=== Former members ===
- Stephan Nedwetzky − lead guitar (1992−1993)
- Brian Steltz − guitar (1993−1994)

== Discography ==
=== Demos ===
- Lost in This Existence (1993)
- Tainted (1994)
- Humor Me, You Funny Little Man (The Red Tape) (1995)

=== Studio albums ===
- It's Hard to Write with a Little Hand (1996)

=== Compilation albums ===
- Discography '93–'99 (2000)

=== Splits ===
- Lethargy / Big Hair 7" (1994)
