= OppoSuits =

Dutch clothing company

- Company type: Privately held company/Cooperative
- Industry: Clothing
- Founded: 2012
- Headquarters: Roelofarendsveen, Netherlands
- Key people: Jasper Castelein, Co-founder / Director; Jelle van der Zwet, Co-founder / Director; Guus Bakker, Co-founder / Director
- Products: Clothing; Fashion; Suits
- Number of employees: 27 (2016)
- Website: www.opposuits.com

OppoSuits is a clothing company founded by Jasper Castelein, Jelle van der Zwet and Guus Bakker in 2012 in Amsterdam. With warehouses in Holland, UK and United States OppoSuits' products are shipped worldwide.

In 2014 the brand won the prize for the Best Small / Medium Enterprise at the Golden Bridge Trade & Export Awards in London. According to a press release, the jury was "impressed by the fact that OppoSuits in just a few years after the start has grown into a multimillion-dollar company that does business with both consumers and retailers in more than 50 countries worldwide. "After starting with an orange suit for Dutch soccer fans in 2012, OppoSuits' collection has expanded to more than 30 designs and is being sold in more than 1,100 stores in Europe, the United States and Canada.

On 1 November 2016, OppoSuits announced a women's collection, with a skirt and jacket.

== Attention from the media ==
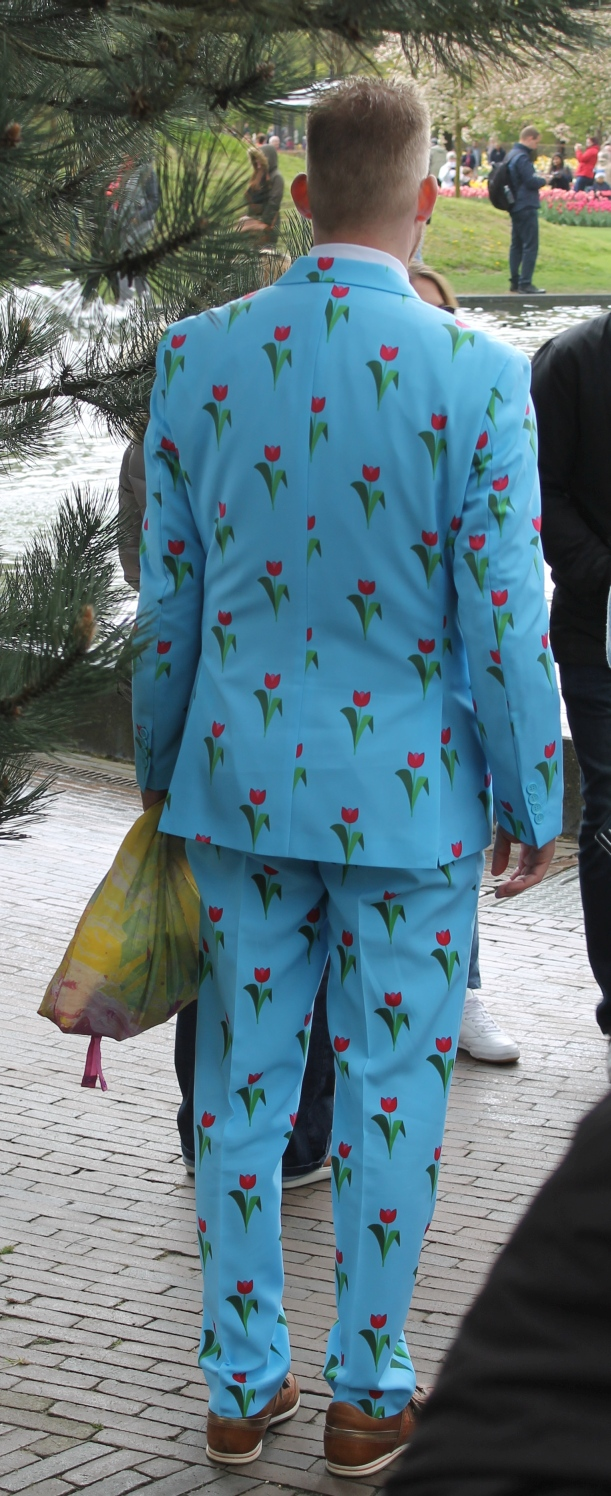
OppoSuit worn at Keukenhof

During the Christmas of 2014 OppoSuits were mentioned in the media when their holiday styles were worn by celebrities like Jimmy Kimmel and Spencer Hawes.

When drummer Brann Dailor from Mastodon wore a suit from OppoSuits to the 2015 Grammys it was mentioned in 9gag, NME and the Los Angeles Times.

In 2015 the Christmas suits from OppoSuits went viral with James Basten wearing them on Tinder getting 1609 matches in a week. This received coverage from Unilad, BroBible, EliteDaily and LADbible among others.

At the Miss Universe 2015 final telecast judge celebrity entertainment mogul Perez Hilton wore a suit from OppoSuits whilst walking the red carpet and during the show. Hilton was hailed as Best Dressed by Bustle Magazine

NFL stars Brian Orakpo and Devin Taylor also donned Christmas suits from OppoSuits during winter 2015. This created a lot of attention from US media.

== Major retailers selling OppoSuits ==
Both major and minor retailers are carrying OppoSuits in Europe and North America. Some of the major chains being Macy's, Debenhams, Nordstrom Argos., Kohl's, House of Fraser and The Hudson's Bay Company.
