= Show Yourself (Mastodon song) =

Single by Mastodon

from the album Emperor of Sand
- Released: February 3, 2017
- Recorded: 2016
- Genre: Hard rock
- Length: 3:03
- Label: Reprise
- Producer: Brendan O'Brien

Mastodon singles chronology
"Sultan's Curse" (2017)	"Show Yourself" (2017)	"Steambreather" (2017)

"Show Yourself" is a single by American progressive metal band Mastodon, off of their studio album Emperor of Sand. It peaked at number 4 on the Billboard Mainstream Rock Songs chart in 2017, making it their highest-charting song to date.

== Background ==
The guitar riff for the song was first created by band guitarist Bill Kelliher while creating a collection of riffs when on tour in 2016. With most of the band's members alternating vocal duties on the band's song, vocals for "Show Yourself" were handled by drummer Brann Dailor. Dailor was initially hesitant to sing on the track, personally not liking the guitar riff, referring to it as "too easy", though he later changed his mind on it. Dailor reflected on the track's simplicity, stating:

I guess there's a part of me that doesn't want to let people down, and I thought some of our most critical fans would frown on this version of us, so I wanted to sidestep it. But Troy [Sanders] was really into it, so that started to sway me. And when I came up with the vocal pattern, it was really obvious and kinda sounded like Queens of the Stone Age to me. It was like, 'Oh, we're wearing a Queens costume.' And I liked it. And once the album came into focus, it was like, 'We need something like this.' It's like an oasis in a really dense record.

The song was released as the second single from their album Emperor of Sand, on February 3, 2017. The band performed the track live on Jimmy Kimmel Live! on April 3, 2017.

== Themes and composition ==
The song comes from the band's seventh studio album, Emperor of Sand, a concept album which explores heavy themes such as humanity's existence and limited mortality through the scenario of a person being diagnosed with cancer and going through chemotherapy. The song lyrically plays into the same concepts, with lines such as "You're not as safe as far as I can tell, and I can tell / Only you can save yourself / Soon this will all be a distant memory / Or could this dream be real at all?" While the band is known for music that is progressive rock and complicated in structure, the song is relatively straightforward, with Rolling Stone describing the track as "relatively stripped-down, melodic and direct. 'Show Yourself' erupts from a straight-ahead riff layered with spasms of wild guitar from Brent Hinds. The song features a guitar solo by Hinds as well. Stereogum noted that, while the band's first single, "Sultan's Curse" contained the atmosphere of their earlier work, "Show Yourself" instead sounded like the "grungy chug-brood more in line with the work that the band has been doing in recent years". Dailor summed up the song as "super-poppy” by Mastodon standards, while still dealing with the same themes of death and sadness".

== Music video ==
Contrary to the heavier, serious subject matter tackled by the song and its respective album, the song's music video is more light-hearted and campy in tone. The video features a down-on-his-luck, sad sack version of The Grim Reaper who, feeling pressure from an angry boss and wife at home, is tasked with killing the members of the band. The Reaper then begins his mission, but ends up killing only look-alikes of the band - impaling "Hinds" with a broken guitar neck, locking "Dailor" in a tanning bed, hitting "Sanders" with a copy machine, and throwing a toaster in "Kelliher"'s bath - leading to the Reaper getting "fired". It is only after his firing that the Reaper ends up killing the band. The video ends with him getting his job and wife back, and earning a brand new hearse, for his efforts.

== Reception ==
The band's live performance of the song on Jimmy Kimmel Live! was specifically praised by Consequence of Sound, describing the performance as " Mastodon aren’t your typical metal band, and they proved that with their performance on last night’s Jimmy Kimmel Live...Atlanta’s favorite progressive rockers delivered a smashing performance of their Emperor of Sand single "Show Yourself", scoring major points for their accessible brand of insanity" and concluding that "It's performances like this one that could well convince an unfamiliar late night crowd to give metal a solid shot." Loudwire similarly praised Dailor's "crisp, clean delivery" of his vocals and Hinds' wailing guitar solo in the performance.

== Personnel ==
- Brann Dailor − vocals, drums
- Troy Sanders − vocals, bass
- Brent Hinds − lead guitar
- Bill Kelliher − rhythm guitar

== Charts ==
Chart (2017)	Peak position
US Hot Rock & Alternative Songs (Billboard)	37
US Mainstream Rock (Billboard)	4
