= It's Hard to Write with a Little Hand =

Studio album by Lethargy
- Released: 1996
- Recorded: Watchmen Records
- Genres: Technical death metal, mathcore
- Label: Dirty Girl Music / Endless Records

Professional ratings
Review scores
| Source | Rating |
|---|---|
| AllMusic | 3.5/5 stars |
| Chronicles of Chaos | 9/10 |

It's Hard to Write with a Little Hand is the only album by American mathcore band Lethargy, released in 1996.

The final track, "Humorless", is a remix of "Humor Me".

== Reception ==
AllMusic wrote that the album "helped elevate heavy metal to unprecedented 'serious music' status, its labyrinthine sonic contortions paving the way for what would later become recognized as the 'math-metal' movement."

== Track listing ==
All tracks are written by Lethargy.

| No. | Title | Length |
|---|---|---|
| 1. | "Careborne" | 3:19 |
| 2. | "Humor Me" | 3:37 |
| 3. | "Create" | 4:09 |
| 4. | "Spill" | 5:44 |
| 5. | "Erased" | 3:10 |
| 6. | "Medley" | 7:32 |
| 7. | "Spineless" | 4:14 |
| 8. | "Thread" | 5:10 |
| 9. | "Among" | 3:38 |
| 10. | "Humorless" | 6:24 |
| Total length: | | 46:57 |

== Personnel ==
- Erik Burke – guitar, vocals
- Brann Dailor – drums
- Bill Kelliher – guitar
- Adam Routier – bass
