= Nosebleed Weekend =

Studio album by the Coathangers
- Released: April 15, 2016
- Genre: Punk rock
- Length: 38:30
- Label: Suicide Squeeze
- Producer: Nic Jodoin

The Coathangers chronology
Suck My Shirt (2014)	Nosebleed Weekend (2016)	Parasite (2017)

Nosebleed Weekend is the fifth studio album by American punk rock band the Coathangers. It was released on April 15, 2016, on Suicide Squeeze Records.

== Critical reception ==
Professional ratings
Aggregate scores
Source	Rating
Metacritic	66/100
Review scores
Source	Rating
AllMusic	3.5/5 stars
Consequence of Sound	B
Paste	8/10
PopMatters	4/10 stars
Spin	8/10
Tiny Mix Tapes	3/5
Vice (Expert Witness)	(A−)

Reviews for Nosebleed Weekend were generally favorable. On Metacritic, the album has a rating of 66 out of 100 based on 9 reviews, indicating "generally favorable reviews". Mark Deming, writing for Allmusic, gave the album 3.5 out of 5 stars, saying of the Coathangers that "If their rock & roll is still on the minimal side [on this album], it's delivered with capable skill and a sense of drama."

=== Accolades ===
Publication	Accolade	Year	Rank
Paste	The 50 Best Albums of 2016	2016	44

== Track listing ==
No.	Title	Length
1.	"Perfume"	3:59
2.	"Dumb Baby"	2:40
3.	"Squeeki Tiki"	2:47
4.	"Excuse Me?"	2:50
5.	"Make It Right"	3:01
6.	"Nosebleed Weekend"	2:42
7.	"Watch Your Back"	2:41
8.	"Burn Me"	2:24
9.	"I Don't Think So"	2:41
10.	"Down Down"	3:10
11.	"Hiya"	2:34
12.	"Had Enough"	2:49
13.	"Copycat"	4:21
Total length:		38:30

== Personnel ==
- Julia Kugel (Crook Kid Coathanger) – Guitar, vocals
- Stephanie Luke (Rusty Coathanger) – Drums, vocals
- Meredith Franco (Minnie Coathanger) – Bass guitar, vocals
- Ryan Frederiksen – Assistant
- Nic Jodoin – Engineer, producer
- Chris Maciel – Assistant Engineer
- Matt Odom – Design, photography
- Jared Swilley – Vocals
