= The Hunter (Mastodon album) =

Studio album by Mastodon
- Released: September 26, 2011
- Recorded: May – June 2011
- Studios: Sound City (Van Nuys, California); Doppler (Atlanta, Georgia)
- Genres: Stoner metal; progressive metal; hard rock
- Length: 52:54
- Labels: Reprise, Roadrunner
- Producer: Mike Elizondo

Mastodon chronology
Live at the Aragon (2011)	The Hunter (2011)	Live at Brixton (2013)

Limited Edition cover

Singles from The Hunter
- 1. "Black Tongue" Released: July 25, 2011; 2. "Curl of the Burl" Released: August 16, 2011; 3. "Dry Bone Valley" Released: February 13, 2012

The Hunter is the fifth studio album by American heavy metal band Mastodon. Released through Roadrunner Records on September 26, 2011, in the UK and one day later in the US via Reprise Records, The Hunter is their first release with producer Mike Elizondo. In its first week of release in the UK, the album reached number 19 on the UK Albums Chart and position number 10 on the Billboard 200 chart selling over 39,000 copies in the first week. As of December 2011, The Hunter has sold over 75,133 copies in the United States.

== Recording and promotion ==
The album was recorded at Sound City Studios in Los Angeles with producer Mike Elizondo (whose credits include Fiona Apple, Eminem, Alanis Morissette, Avenged Sevenfold, and Maroon 5).

In an interview with MTV Germany, it was revealed that the new album will be called The Hunter in honor of Brent Hinds's brother who died while hunting during the making of the album. Speaking to Noisecreep, drummer Brann Dailor described the new material as not so much proggy as riff-oriented and "a little more stripped down," akin to that of Leviathan (2004) and "like a really super-heavy Led Zeppelin or something." Asked if Brent Hinds is again responsible for most of the initial songwriting, Dailor replied, "I think it's a little more collaborative, with everyone chipping in."

In April 2011, Mastodon announced two of the titles from their forthcoming album: "Blasteroid" and "All the Heavy Lifting". On June 16, the band's website posted the names of three more songs: "Octopus Has No Friends", "Stargasm", and "Curl of the Burl". On July 25, a song from the album, titled "Black Tongue", was released via iTunes, Spotify, and Ovi Music. On August 12, "Curl of the Burl", was uploaded to YouTube on the band's official channel. On September 2, the song "Spectrelight" was uploaded to the channel.

On Rockline Radio on September 26, Mastodon revealed that the song "Curl of the Burl" was based on an episode of the hit show Intervention. It was also revealed that, while the whole album does not have a unified elemental theme, the classical Chinese element "wood" is a common motif throughout the album.

== Music and lyrical themes ==
The Hunter is Mastodon's second non-concept album. Moreover, The Hunter marks the first time that drummer Brann Dailor composes and sings a Mastodon song in its entirety ("Creature Lives"), and takes lead vocal duties on more than two songs. Like Mastodon's previous album Crack the Skye, The Hunter features a mix of clean singing and a few songs with harsher shouting vocals. The song "Spectrelight" features Neurosis vocalist/guitarist Scott Kelly as a guest. It was titled "The Hunter" in honour of singer and lead guitarist Brent Hinds' brother, who died in a hunting accident while the band were making the record.

== Artwork and packaging ==
The album artwork features the wooden sculpture titled Sad Demon Oath by AJ Fosik, a wood carver who is also responsible for a backdrop the band uses live. This marks a departure from Paul Romano, who did all their artwork to date.

== Reception ==
Professional ratings
Aggregate scores
Source	Rating
Metacritic	83/100
Review scores
Source	Rating
AllMusic	4/5 stars
Alternative Press	4.5/5 stars
Blabbermouth.net	9.5/10
Entertainment Weekly	A−
The Guardian	4/5 stars
Kerrang!	5/5 stars
Pitchfork	7.5/10
Q	5/5 stars
Rolling Stone	4/5 stars
Slant Magazine	4/5 stars

The Hunter has been met with universal acclaim from music critics. At Metacritic, which assigns a rating out of 100 to reviews from mainstream critics, the album has received a score of 83, based on 29 reviews. The album achieved an overall rating of 7.7/10 at AnyDecentMusic? based on 21 reviews, making it the year's highest-rated metal album among mainstream reviewers.

Under the Gun Review's Jordan Munson posted one of the first reviews for The Hunter on September 7, giving it a 9 out of 10 score. In his review, Munson summarized his thoughts by stating "It's safe to say that The Hunter can be chalked up as another great step for Mastodon. They've once again stepped over whatever boundaries they feel like, and have ended up for the better."

Toby Gwynne of The Quietus praised the record as a significant progression for the group: "Each of Mastodon's previous four releases exist in their own worlds, and have their own specific characteristics – the genius here is that they've managed to pull in all that made those LP's what they were and combine them to create something both familiar and unexpected."

Mike Diver, writing for BBC Music, concluded: "The Hunter, with its monstrous choruses, powerful percussion and jaw-on-the-floor fret-work, is sure to connect with anyone who's previously rocked out to the band's wares just as easily as it will absolute beginners. Don't like metal? You might just love Mastodon."

AllMusic reviewed the album giving it a score of 4 out of 5, saying "Mastodon's increasingly accessible sound may not land them a hit anytime soon, but cuts like 'Black Tongue', 'Curl of the Burl' and 'Blasteroid', all of which arrive in sequence at the front of the set, show a willingness to write within the parameters of 21st-century pop music's dark side."

=== Accolades ===
Decade-end lists

Publication	Accolade	Rank
Consequence	Top 25 Metal Albums of the 2010s	19
Discogs	The 200 Best Albums of the 2010s	142
Kerrang!	The 75 Best Albums of the 2010s	4

== Track listing ==
All tracks are written by Mastodon.

No.	Title	Lead vocals	Length
1.	"Black Tongue"	Troy Sanders	3:27
2.	"Curl of the Burl"	Brann Dailor, Brent Hinds, Sanders	3:40
3.	"Blasteroid"	Sanders, Hinds	2:35
4.	"Stargasm"	Sanders, Hinds, Dailor	4:39
5.	"Octopus Has No Friends"	Dailor, Sanders	3:48
6.	"All the Heavy Lifting"	Sanders, Dailor	4:31
7.	"The Hunter"	Hinds, Sanders	5:17
8.	"Dry Bone Valley"	Dailor, Sanders, Hinds	3:59
9.	"Thickening"	Hinds, Sanders	4:30
10.	"Creature Lives"	Dailor	4:41
11.	"Spectrelight" (feat. Scott Kelly)	Sanders, Kelly	3:09
12.	"Bedazzled Fingernails"	Sanders	3:08
13.	"The Sparrow"	Mastodon	5:30
Total length:			52:54

Limited edition bonus tracks
No.	Title	Lead vocals	Length
14.	"The Ruiner"	Sanders	3:11
15.	"Deathbound"	Sanders, Hinds	2:48
Total length:			58:53

== Personnel ==
Mastodon

- Brann Dailor – drums, vocals
- Brent Hinds – lead guitar, lap-steel, vocals
- Bill Kelliher – rhythm guitar, lead guitar on "Black Tongue"
- Troy Sanders – bass, vocals

Additional musicians

- Scott Kelly – additional vocals and lyrics on "Spectrelight"
- Rich Morris – synths and keyboards on "Stargasm" and "Bedazzled Fingernails"
- Will Raines – synths and keyboards on "The Sparrow" and "The Hunter"
- Dave Palmer – synths and keyboards on "Creature Lives"

Production

- Mike Elizondo – producer
- Adam Hawkins – recording engineer, mixing
- Alexander Eermin – assistant engineer at Doppler Studios
- Brent Arrowood – mix assistant
- Nick Haussling – project coordinator
- Doug Hill – recording of Scott Kelly vocals
- Ted Jensen – mastering
- AJ Fosik – "The Hunter" sculpture
- Casey Howard – illustration
- Alicia J. Rose – sculpture photography
- Donny Phillips – art direction and design
- Frank Maddocks & Norman Wonderly – creative direction

== Charts ==
Chart (2011)	Peak position
Australian Albums (ARIA)	18
Austrian Albums (Ö3 Austria)	23
Belgian Albums (Ultratop Flanders)	27
Belgian Albums (Ultratop Wallonia)	44
Canadian Albums (Billboard)	15
Danish Albums (Hitlisten)	11
Dutch Albums (Album Top 100)	33
Finnish Albums (Suomen virallinen lista)	13
French Albums (SNEP)	73
German Albums (Offizielle Top 100)	20
Hungarian Albums Chart	20
Irish Albums (IRMA)	26
Italian Albums (FIMI)	55
New Zealand Albums (RMNZ)	12
Norwegian Albums (VG-lista)	8
Scottish Albums (Official Charts)	15
Spanish Albums (PROMUSICAE)	46
Swedish Albums (Sverigetopplistan)	10
Swiss Albums (Schweizer Hitparade)	23
UK Albums (OCC)	19
US Billboard 200	10
US Top Alternative Albums (Billboard)	4
US Top Hard Rock Albums (Billboard)	2
US Top Rock Albums (Billboard)	5
US Top Tastemakers (Billboard)	3
