= Remission (Mastodon album) =

Studio album by Mastodon
- Released: May 28, 2002
- Recorded: October 2001
- Genres: Sludge metal; progressive metal; metalcore
- Length: 50:22
- Label: Relapse
- Producers: Matt Bayles, Mastodon

Mastodon chronology
Lifesblood (2001)	Remission (2002)	Leviathan (2004)

Singles from Remission
- 1. "March of the Fire Ants" Released: November 18, 2003

Remission is the debut album by American heavy metal band Mastodon. It was released on May 28, 2002, through Relapse Records. A deluxe edition was released on October 21, 2003. In 2014, the reissue was released in digital and CD format with higher quality than the original and with a booklet inside with new images.

== Production ==
Most of the songs were written long before the album was recorded. "Trainwreck" was first performed in 2000, while vocalist Eric Saner was still in the band. "Workhorse" was premiered live in Memphis in July 2001. "Trampled Under Hoof", "Trilobite", "Where Strides the Behemoth", "Crusher Destroyer" and "Mother Puncher" were all played on a WFMU radio show on August 7, 2001.

The beginning of "Crusher Destroyer" features a short sample of the roar of the Tyrannosaurus rex from the film Jurassic Park.

== Theme and cover art ==
Troy Sanders has said that the album's theme is the element of fire. However, Remission was Mastodon's only album not considered a concept album until 2011's The Hunter.

In an interview with online magazine Lollipop in 2004, Brann Dailor explained how Remission was an album that helped him cope with his sister's death:

"My sister committed suicide when I was 15 (she was 14)...I was never able to put that stuff anywhere. All that pain I was carrying inside. The pain of losing her had always been there. With Today Is the Day, there was a lot of anger involved. After that, I didn't want to be angry. When I start playing in Mastodon and moved to Atlanta, there was a big personal healing. Mastodon had a lot to do with that. That's one of the main reasons that the album is titled Remission. Remission means forgiveness and healing. Mastodon helped me do that: Forgive a lot of things that happened in my life."

== Reception ==
Professional ratings
Review scores
Source	Rating
AllMusic	4/5 stars
Metal Storm	10/10
Pitchfork	9.0/10
Punknews.org	4.5/5 stars
Rock Hard	8/10
Sputnikmusic	4/5 stars
Stylus Magazine	A

Remission received overwhelmingly positive reception. AllMusic's Brian O'Neill noted the album's "technical ecstasy" with "a complex slant that nears prog rock proportions". He also compared the "Southern-sounding" jazzy drumming and clean guitars of "Ol'e Nessie" to the Allmans.

Bryan Haywood of Pitchfork Media praised the album's production and drummer Brann Dailor as the stand-out musician. "They drop in just enough [mathematics] to keep the arrangements flavorful, but not so much as to overload the vintage guitar riffs with Dream Theater-like complexity. And then they counterbalance it with some nice, old-fashioned, Sabbath-style metal attitude." Haywood commented, "The complete package sounds timeless, but in that unbelievable way that you've never heard before."

Kerrang! named the album in their list "The 13 Most Essential Sludge Records". In 2024, Loudwire elected it as one of the 11 best progressive metal debut albums.

== Commercial performance ==
As of 2006, Remission has sold 49,000 units in the United States.

== Deluxe edition ==
A deluxe edition of the album – folded in digipak and released on October 21, 2003 – contained a bonus DVD with a professionally filmed nine-song live set recorded at The Masquerade in Atlanta, Georgia, on December 1, 2002. Another additional feature is a cover of the Thin Lizzy song "Emerald", which appears as a bonus track on the CD.

The deluxe edition release coincided with a music video for "March of the Fire Ants", which had significant airplay on both Uranium and Headbangers Ball and featured dark elements such as a man being dug up and placed in a throne.

== Song appearances ==
In 2002, "March of the Fire Ants" was included on a 7" split album opposite of High on Fire's "Hung, Drawn and Quartered". After the Remission re-release, it was featured on the Contaminated 5.0, MTV2 Headbangers Ball, and Take Action!, Vol. 4 compilations.

"Where Strides the Behemoth" was included on Contaminated 6.0 and From the Shadows – Metal for the Modern Era.

"Crusher Destroyer" was featured on the soundtrack to the 2003 video game Tony Hawk's Underground.

== Track listing ==
All tracks are written by Mastodon.

No.	Title	Length
1.	"Crusher Destroyer"	2:00
2.	"March of the Fire Ants"	4:25
3.	"Where Strides the Behemoth"	2:55
4.	"Workhorse"	3:45
5.	"Ol'e Nessie"	6:04
6.	"Burning Man"	2:46
7.	"Trainwreck"	7:04
8.	"Trampled Under Hoof"	3:00
9.	"Trilobite"	6:30
10.	"Mother Puncher"	3:48
11.	"Elephant Man" (Instrumental; song ends at 5:40. After a minute of silence, begins an untitled hidden track.)	8:05
Total length:		50:22

Deluxe edition bonus track
No.	Title	Length
12.	"Emerald" (Thin Lizzy cover)	3:49

Deluxe edition DVD track list
No.	Title	Length
1.	"Ol'e Nessie" (Live)	6:21
2.	"March of the Fire Ants" (Live)	4:51
3.	"Hail to Fire" (Live)	2:30
4.	"Where Strides the Behemoth" (Live)	3:17
5.	"Battle at Sea" (Live)	4:11
6.	"Mother Puncher" (Live)	4:49
7.	"Burning Man" (Live)	3:15
8.	"Workhorse" (Live)	3:52
9.	"Crusher Destroyer" (Live)	2:16

== Personnel ==
Mastodon

- Brann Dailor − drums
- Brent Hinds − lead guitar, vocals
- Bill Kelliher − rhythm guitar
- Troy Sanders − bass, vocals

Production

- Matt Bayles – producer, recording, mixing
- Matthew Jacobson – executive producer
- Dave Shirk – mastering
- Matt Washburn – digital editing
- Paul Romano – artwork and design
