= Crack the Skye =

Studio album by Mastodon
- Released: March 24, 2009
- Recorded: April–September 2008
- Studios: Southern Tracks, Atlanta, Georgia
- Genre: Progressive metal
- Length: 50:03
- Labels: Reprise; Sire; Relapse
- Producer: Brendan O'Brien

Mastodon chronology
Blood Mountain (2006)	Crack the Skye (2009)	Jonah Hex: Revenge Gets Ugly EP (2010)

Singles from Crack the Skye
- 1. "Divinations" Released: January 20, 2009; 2. "Oblivion" Released: February 16, 2009

Crack the Skye is the fourth studio album by American heavy metal band Mastodon, released on March 24, 2009, through Reprise, Sire and Relapse Records.

It is the band's first studio album to feature drummer Brann Dailor as Mastodon's third lead vocalist. Dailor wrote most of the lyrics for the album, while guitarist Brent Hinds wrote most of the music. It is a concept album with a narrative that mixes science fiction with Tsarist Russian history, rooted in band members' personal struggles. These include the death of Dailor's sister Skye, who the album is named after, as well as Hinds' recovery from a brain hemorrhage he sustained from a fight after the 2007 MTV VMAs.

The album debuted at number 11 on the Billboard 200, selling 41,000 copies in its first week. In Australia, the album debuted at number 19. It had sold 200,000 copies in the US as of September 2010, making it one of their highest-selling albums to date.

== Musical and lyrical themes ==
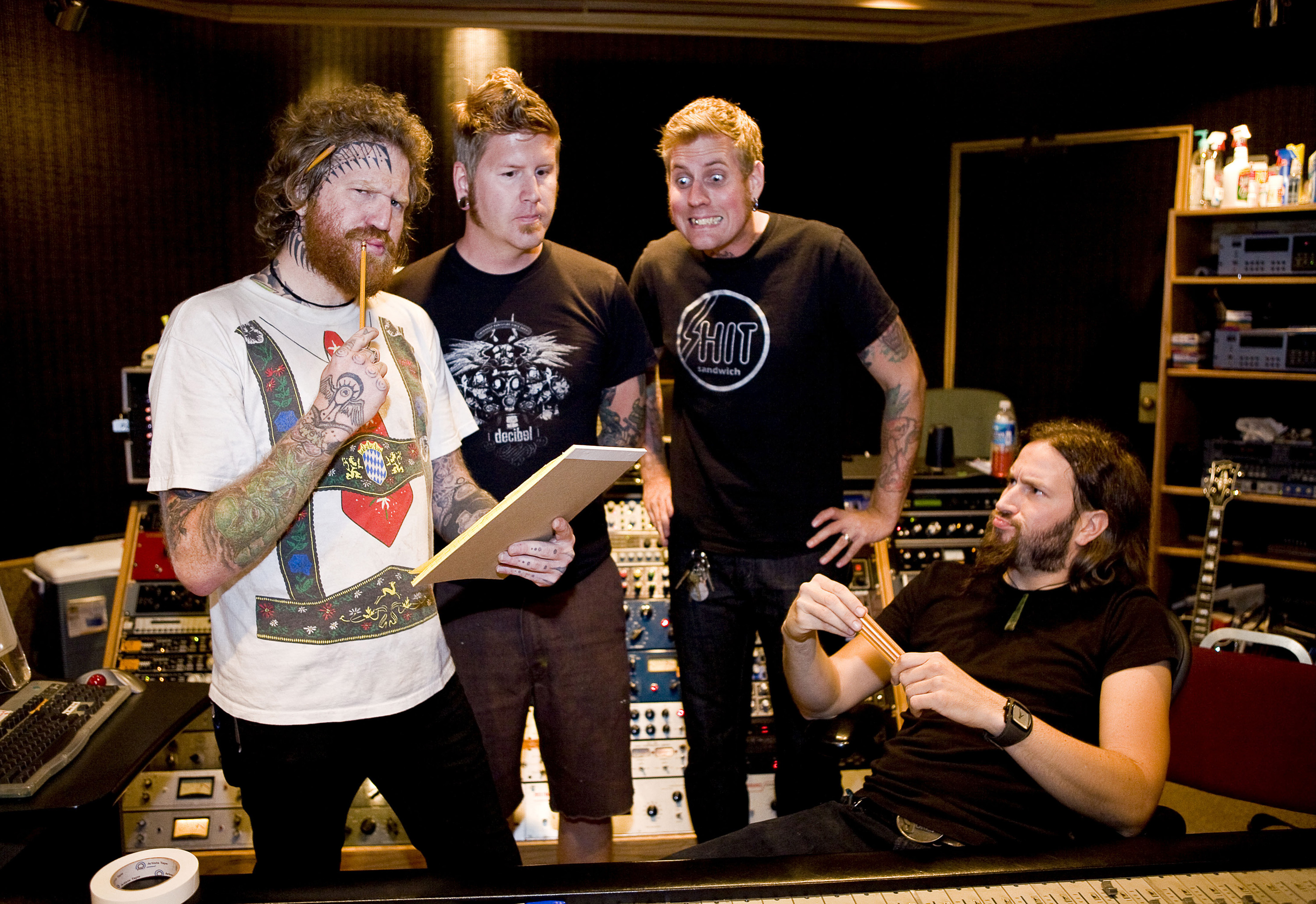
The band in Southern Tracks recording studio in Atlanta, Georgia

Drummer Brann Dailor described the album as more "focused" than its predecessor, Blood Mountain: "Maybe there was a deeper heart to this record that needed more exploring ... We got more involved with feeling the vibe of the record and everything feels more creepy and spaced out and something special is going on." During the composition of the record, Brent Hinds listened to In the Court of the Crimson King by King Crimson every day as inspiration, while Dailor and Troy Sanders listened to Pink Floyd's Animals.

Hinds was recovering from head injuries – brain hemorrhaging, a broken nose and two black eyes – that he suffered in an altercation after the 2007 MTV Video Music Awards with System of a Down bassist Shavo Odadjian. While recovering, Hinds favored more "laid-back" music because of his vertigo.

Vocalist/bassist Troy Sanders said in an interview with Stereogum, "Crack the Skye is a departure from everything we've previously recorded in the sense that we kinda strapped on our aeroshells and departed from Earth for a while, and then captained to the ethereal element of the universe and kind of slept on the roof of the world for a while to get a perspective on this record. ... Basically we're exploring the ethereal world. We're dissecting the dark matter that dominates the universe, in a nutshell."

When asked in multiple interviews Dailor said the record would tell a story dealing variously with the art aesthetics of Tsarist Russia, astral travel, out of body experiences and Stephen Hawking's theories on wormholes.

There is a paraplegic and the only way that he can go anywhere is if he astral travels. He goes out of his body, into outer space and a bit like Icarus, he goes too close to the sun, burning off the golden umbilical cord that is attached to his solar plexus. So he is in outer space and he is lost, he gets sucked into a wormhole, he ends up in the spirit realm and he talks to spirits telling them that he is not really dead. So they send him to the Russian cult, they use him in a divination and they find out his problem. They decide they are going to help him. They put his soul inside Rasputin's body. Rasputin goes to usurp the czar and he is murdered. The two souls fly out of Rasputin's body through the crack in the sky(e) and Rasputin is the wise man that is trying to lead the child home to his body because his parents have discovered him by now and think that he is dead. Rasputin needs to get him back into his body before it's too late. But they end up running into the Devil along the way and the Devil tries to steal their souls and bring them down ... there are some obstacles along the way.

Dailor has also said that Crack the Skye is meant as a homage to his sister, Skye Dailor, who died by suicide at age 14.

My sister passed away when I was a teenager and it was awful, and there's no better way to pay tribute to a lost loved one than having an opportunity to be in a group with my friends and we make art together. Her name was Skye, so Crack the Skye means a lot of different things. For me personally, it means the moment of being told you lost someone dear to you, [that moment] is enough to crack the sky.

Scott Kelly, who guested on the title track, has this to say about the song:

That song was a really, really heavy song to do. That song was about Brann's sister and how she passed away, and it was a story that I was very familiar with from knowing Brann. When he decided to do that, he called me up to talk to me about it and said "this is what I wanna do" and "I really, really want you to sing the song" and I said, you know "sure, I will". I took it really seriously and I emailed with Brann's Dad a couple of times and just talked to him about Skye, and then he sent me a photograph of her actually, and I sat there and looked at that photograph of her and just kinda meditated on her and on all of the situation, and the family and then actually set all that shit up in the studio and recorded the song with her picture there, and I just really tried to do it as real as I felt I could.

== Packaging ==
Paul Romano, who had done all of Mastodon's album artwork to that point, created the art for Crack the Skye. The piece features various ethereal images tied in closely with the overall concept of the record. Crack the Skye was released in two editions: the standard and limited edition. The latter has an elaborate packaging with a tunnel book that, when looked through, reveals three-dimensional-like imagery. A "hidden" picture of Brann Dailor's sister, Skye, can be seen on both sides of the tunnel book as well.

== Release ==
Crack the Skye has been released as standard CD version and CD/DVD version, which included a bonus DVD with a documentary and a track commentary. Furthermore, standard single-disc LP and limited-edition 2xLP were released. A "super-deluxe" CD/DVD version that includes a tunnel book and a lithograph of the album art sold out during pre-orders, and a "Royal Edition" with a CD of the instrumental versions of the songs and an entirely new black-and-gold artwork was released on December 15, 2009.

== Critical reception ==
Professional ratings
Aggregate scores
Source	Rating
Metacritic	82/100
Review scores
Source	Rating
AllMusic	4/5 stars
AbsolutePunk	88%
The Guardian	4/5 stars
MetalSucks	5/5 stars
Paste	9.0/10
Pitchfork	8.0/10
PopMatters	8/10
Rock Sound	10/10
Rolling Stone	4/5 stars
Spin	4/5 stars

The initial critical response from music critics to Crack the Skye was very positive. At Metacritic, which assigns a normalized rating out of 100 to reviews from mainstream critics, the album has received a score of 82, based on 29 reviews, indicating "Universal Acclaim".

Amongst the positive reviews received from critics was Total Guitar's Nick Cracknell who awarded the album a 5/5 rating, describing it as "even more ambitious in scope and sound than 2006's Blood Mountain. Embracing elements of prog and country, but above all classic rock, Hinds and Kelliher literally add new dimensions to the band's ever-expanding sound." Decibel, who named Blood Mountain as their number 1 album of 2006, gave Crack the Skye a 7/10 rating as reviewer Joe Gross responded that "Crack is clearly designed as a grower, not a shower, the sound of a band that grew tired of people not responding to their ground game, so they put the ball in the air. Who knows when it will come down?" Clash's review was particularly glowing in its praise for the album, saying "no metal release of 2009 is likely to be as important as Crack the Skye." The review praised the album's expansive sound and emotion, and finished by claiming that the album is "surely destined to become the stuff of legend". Reviewer Nate Chinen of The New York Times noted the album's "ambitious vision and vivid execution". The New Yorker pop music critic Sasha Frere-Jones lists it as one of his favorite albums of the year on his personal blog and, in an article for The New Yorker, called Crack the Skye a "deeply entertaining album".

== Accolades ==
Crack the Skye was named amongst the most well received albums of 2009 by numerous music publications. Classic Rock magazine placed it a No. 3 of its Top Albums of 2009, while Kerrang! place it at No. 4 in its Top Albums of 2009. Time magazine placed "Crack the Skye" at No. 3 on its Top 10 Albums of 2009 list, and Rock Sound named it their Album of the Year for 2009. In addition, Spin magazine listed it as the 17th best album of the year. Rhapsody called it the 7th best album of 2009. The album was also voted the No. 1 Album of 2009 by Metal Hammer's critics and contributors. In 2014, TeamRock put Crack the Skye at No. 57 on their Top 100 Greatest Prog Albums of All Time list, commenting: "Mastodon's 2009 album has the blood and thunder from previous releases, but takes everything to a new musical level. A restive and sophisticated piece of work from the prog heavyweights".

The album was honored with a 2009 Metal Storm Award for Best Alternative Metal Album. It also won the 2009 Danish Metal Award for Best International Metal Album.

== Track listing ==
All tracks are written by Mastodon, except "Crack the Skye" (additional lyrics by Scott Kelly).

No.	Title	Lead vocals	Length
1.	"Oblivion"	Brann Dailor, Troy Sanders, Brent Hinds	5:46
2.	"Divinations"	Hinds, Sanders, Dailor	3:38
3.	"Quintessence"	Hinds, Sanders	5:27
4.	"The Czar": I. "Usurper" – 3:45; II. "Escape" – 3:08; III. "Martyr" – 0:35; IV. "Spiral" – 3:26"	Hinds, Sanders	10:54
5.	"Ghost of Karelia"	Sanders, Hinds	5:24
6.	"Crack the Skye" (featuring Scott Kelly)	Kelly, Dailor, Sanders	5:54
7.	"The Last Baron"	Hinds, Sanders	13:00
Total length:			50:03

CD/DVD

- The Making of Crack the Skye – exclusive behind-the-scenes documentary
- Track-by-track commentary – video commentary of the album by the band
- Photo gallery – slide of various images from the band

== Personnel ==
Mastodon

- Brann Dailor – drums, vocals, percussion
- Brent Hinds – lead guitar, vocals, banjo
- Bill Kelliher – rhythm guitar
- Troy Sanders – bass guitar, vocals, bass synth

Guest musicians

- Rich Morris – synths and Mellotron
- Scott Kelly – additional vocals and lyrics on "Crack the Skye"

Production

- Brendan O'Brien – producer, mixing, backing vocals
- Nick DiDia – recording engineer
- Billy Bowers – additional engineering
- Tom Tapley – assistant engineer
- Darren Tablan – assistant engineer
- Doug Hill – recording of Scott Kelly vocals
- Bob Ludwig – mastering
- Paul A. Romano – art direction, artwork, design

== Charts ==
Chart (2009)	Peak position
Australian Albums (ARIA)	19
Austrian Albums (Ö3 Austria)	42
Belgian Albums (Ultratop Flanders)	26
Belgian Albums (Ultratop Wallonia)	73
Canadian Albums (Billboard)	13
Danish Albums (Hitlisten)	37
Dutch Albums (Album Top 100)	56
Finnish Albums (Suomen virallinen lista)	6
French Albums (SNEP)	106
German Albums (Offizielle Top 100)	36
Hungarian Albums (MAHASZ)	38
Irish Albums (IRMA)	37
New Zealand Albums (RMNZ)	23
Norwegian Albums (VG-lista)	6
Scottish Albums (Official Charts)	27
Swedish Albums (Sverigetopplistan)	23
Swiss Albums (Schweizer Hitparade)	58
UK Albums (OCC)	34
US Billboard 200	11
US Top Alternative Albums (Billboard)	4
US Top Hard Rock Albums (Billboard)	3
US Top Rock Albums (Billboard)	4
US Top Tastemakers (Billboard)	1

== Certifications ==
Region	Certification	Certified units/sales
United Kingdom (BPI)	Silver	60,000^{‡}
^{‡} Sales+streaming figures based on certification alone.
