= Brann Dailor =

American drummer and singer

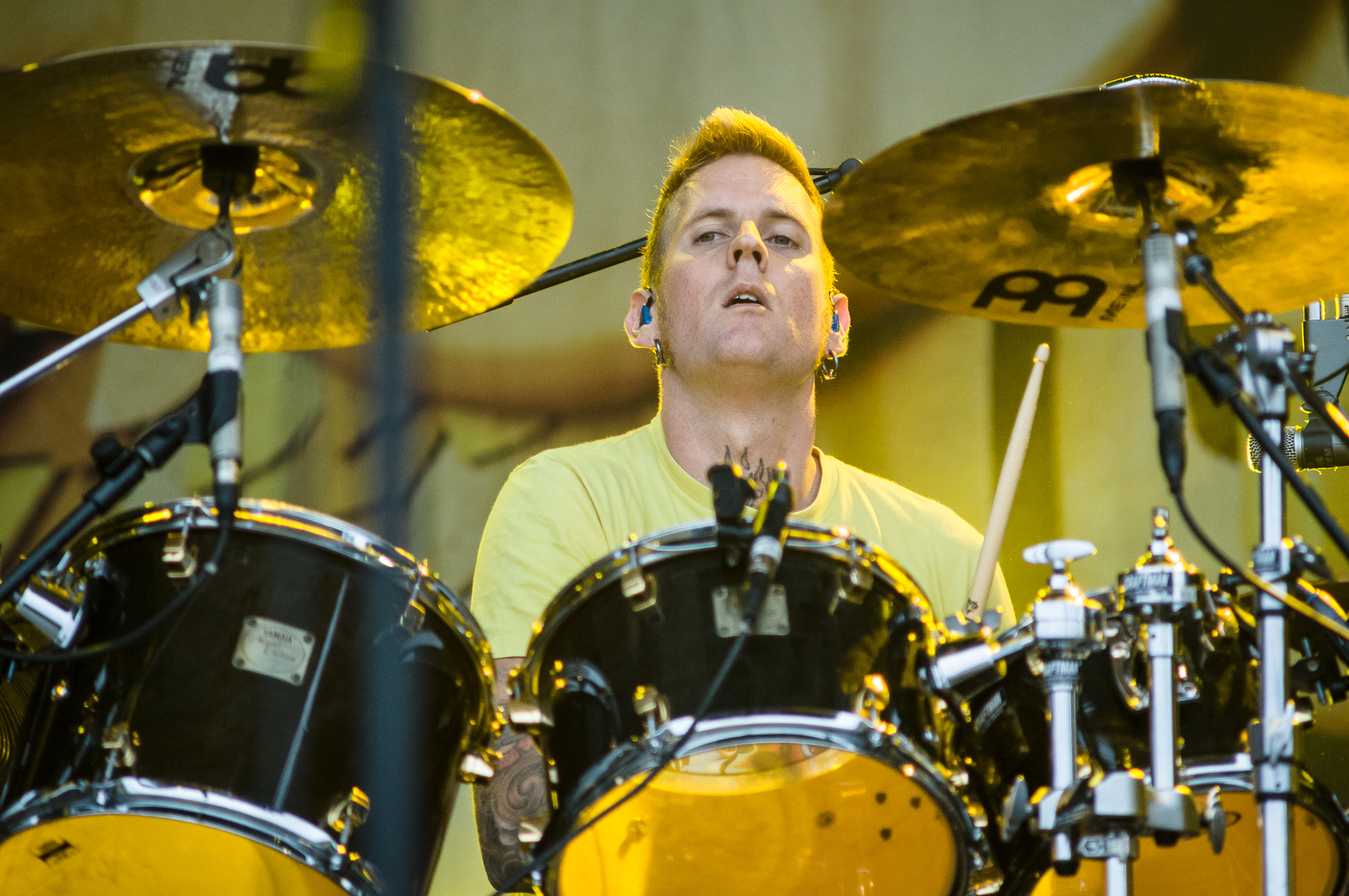
- Dailor performing with Mastodon in 2012

Background information
- Born: Brann Timothy Dailor; March 19, 1975 (age 51); Rochester, New York, U.S.
- Origin: Atlanta, Georgia, U.S.
- Genres: Progressive metal; sludge metal; stoner metal; alternative metal; experimental rock
- Occupations: Musician, songwriter
- Instruments: Drums, vocals
- Years active: 1989–present
- Member of: Mastodon, Arcadea
- Formerly of: Lethargy, Today Is the Day
- Website: mastodonrocks.com

Brann Timothy Dailor (/brɑːn/ BRAHN; born March 19, 1975) is an American musician, best known as a member of heavy metal band Mastodon, in which he is the drummer and one of the vocalists.

== Career ==
Dailor first started playing in a band called Evisceration from 1991 to 1993, at which time the band broke up. Dailor was also a founding member of mathcore band Lethargy, and the progressive rock/funk metal band Gaylord and played with Today Is the Day.

In 2015, Dailor announced his side project called Arcadea. The group features Dailor on drums alongside Atlanta musicians Core Atoms and Raheem Amlani.

Dailor, Bill Kelliher, and Brent Hinds portrayed "wildlings" on S05E08 episode of Game of Thrones, which was filmed in Belfast, Northern Ireland. The band's original song "White Walker" is featured on the Game of Thrones mixtape Catch the Throne Vol. 2, but a press release from Reprise Records reports that the band was personally invited to participate in the show by Game of Thrones executive producer Dan Weiss, who is a fan of the band.

Dailor appeared in a balloon suit from OppoSuits at the 2015 Grammys. Together with Brent Hinds, who sported a full Los Angeles Dodgers uniform, they made several headlines.

Dailor appeared on a 2018 episode of the History Channel reality show Counting Cars called "Heavy Metal Caddy" in which he had his 1970 Cadillac Coupe DeVille restored. He calls his car "Twinkle Toes".

Dailor performed guest vocals on Bleed From Within's song "Immortal Desire" on their 2025 album Zenith.

== Influences ==
Dailor's main influence is Phil Collins of Genesis, specifically the 1970s era. He said that watching Sean Reinert with progressive metal band Cynic opened his eyes as a teen about the possibilities of technical drumming. He is also inspired by Mikkey Dee, Dave Lombardo, Elvin Jones, Tony Williams, Billy Cobham, Bill Bruford, Stevie Wonder and Dave Witte. Dailor's metal bands before Mastodon, Lethargy and Gaylord, were both heavily influenced by avant-garde rock group Mr. Bungle.

== Personal life ==
Dailor is an Agnostic.

== Equipment ==
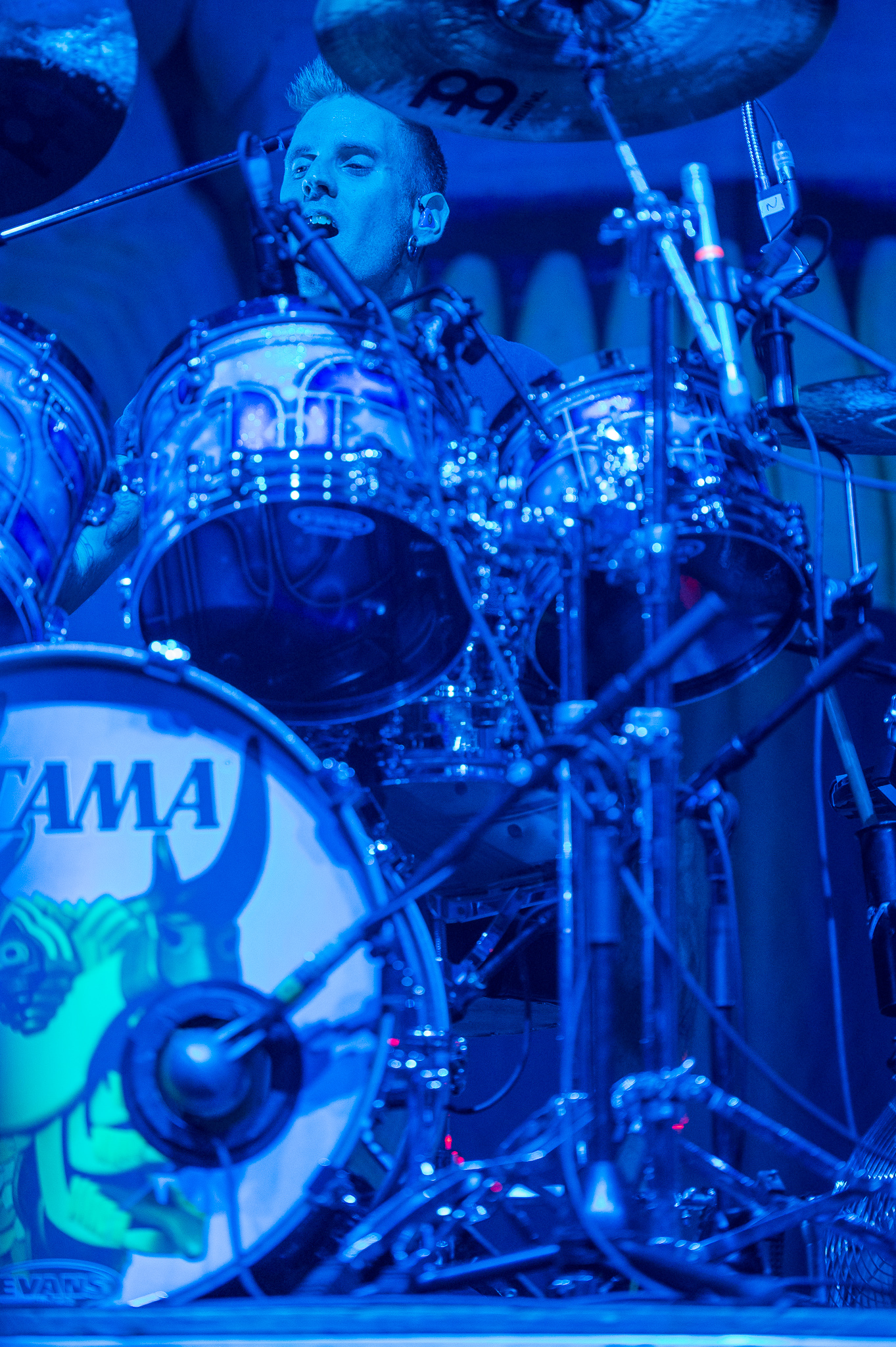
Dailor performing at Rock im Park in 2014

Dailor uses and endorses Tama drums and hardware, Meinl cymbals, Evans Drumheads, and Vater drumsticks.

=== Current kit ===
- Drums – Tama Starclassic Performer B/B
  - 22x18 Bass Drum
  - 10x8 Tom
  - 12x9 Tom
  - 13x10 Tom
  - 16x16 Floor Tom
  - 14x6 Starphonic Brass Snare Drum
- Cymbals – Meinl
  - 14" Mb20 Heavy Soundwave Hi-Hat
  - 18" Mb20 Heavy Crash
  - 20" Mb20 Heavy Crash
  - 8" Classics Medium Bell
  - 21" Mb8 Ghost Ride
- Drumheads – Evans
  - Bass: EQ3 Clear – EQ3 Reso Black
  - Toms: G2 Clear – G1 Clear
  - Snare: Power Center Snare Batter – 300 Snare Side
- Hardware – Tama
  - Tama Speed Cobra Double Bass Pedal
  - Tama Iron Cobra Lever-Glide Hi-Hat Stand
  - Tama 1st Chair Ergo-Rider Drum Throne
- Other
  - Vater 5B Drumsticks

== Discography ==
=== Evisceration ===
- Fondling the Dead (demo, 1992)

=== Lethargy ===
- It's Hard to Write with a Little Hand (1996) – drums

=== Gaylord ===
- Sparkling Cool (1998)

=== Today is the Day ===
- In the Eyes of God (1999) – drums
- Live Till You Die (2000) – drums

=== Mastodon ===
- Remission (2002) – drums
- Leviathan (2004) – drums
- Blood Mountain (2006) – drums, backing vocals
- Crack the Skye (2009) – drums, percussions, vocals
- The Hunter (2011) – drums, percussions, vocals
- Once More 'Round the Sun (2014) – drums, percussion, vocals
- Emperor of Sand (2017) – drums, percussion, vocals, bass guitar, keyboards
- Hushed and Grim (2021) – drums, vocals

=== Arcadea ===
- Arcadea (2017) – drums, percussion, vocals

=== Dark Nights: Metal ===
- "Red Death" (2018) – writer, drums, vocals, percussions, bass guitar
