= Mastodon discography =

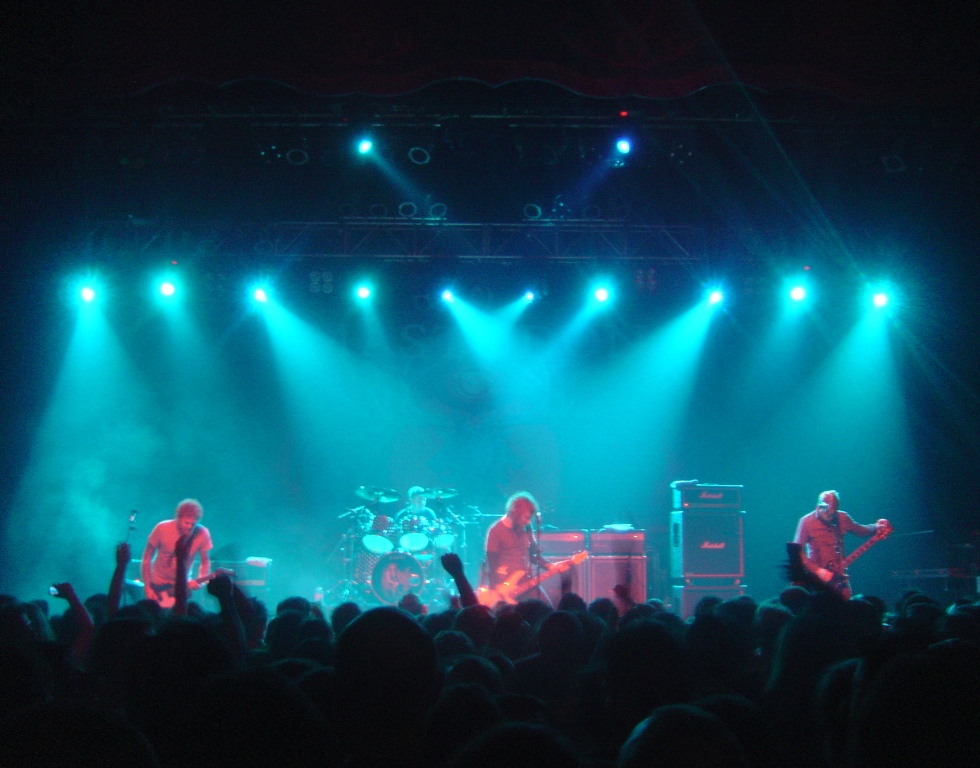
- Mastodon performing live at the London Forum in 2007
- Studio albums: 9
- Extended plays: 6
- Live albums: 2
- Compilation albums: 3
- Singles: 39
- Video albums: 1
- Music videos: 27

The discography of heavy metal band Mastodon consists of nine studio albums, two live albums, three compilation albums, one video album, six extended plays, 39 singles and 27 music videos.

The band was formed in 2000 by guitarists Brent Hinds and Bill Kelliher, bassist and vocalist Troy Sanders, and drummer Brann Dailor, in Atlanta, Georgia. Mastodon released their debut extended play, Slick Leg in 2001, before signing with Relapse Records and releasing their second EP Lifesblood the same year, followed by the band's first studio album in 2002, Remission. After a tour promoting the album, Mastodon released their second studio album, Leviathan, in August 2004. In February 2006, Mastodon released two records—first, a compilation of their first two EPs, titled Call of the Mastodon, and shortly after, the video album, The Workhorse Chronicles. In the same year, Mastodon released their major label debut, Blood Mountain through Reprise Records, peaking at number 32 on the Billboard 200 chart. Mastodon then released Crack the Skye in 2009, The Hunter in 2011, Once More 'Round the Sun in 2014, Emperor of Sand in 2017 and Hushed and Grim in 2021, which entered the Billboard 200 at number 11, number 10, number 6, number 7 and number 20 respectively.

== Albums ==
=== Studio albums ===
List of studio albums, with selected chart positions
Title	Album details	Peak chart positions										Certifications
Title	Album details	US	AUS	FIN	FRA	GER	JPN	NLD	SWE	SWI	UK	Certifications
Remission	Released: May 28, 2002 (US); Label: Relapse; Formats: CD, 2×LP, DL	—	—	—	—	—	—	—	—	—	—	
Leviathan	Released: August 31, 2004 (US); Label: Relapse; Formats: CD, LP, DL	139	—	—	—	—	—	—	—	—	110	
Blood Mountain	Released: September 12, 2006 (US); Label: Reprise; Formats: CD, LP, DL	32	44	—	138	96	—	—	34	—	46	BPI: Silver
Crack the Skye	Released: March 24, 2009 (US); Label: Reprise; Formats: CD, LP, DL	11	18	6	73	20	122	33	23	58	34	BPI: Silver
The Hunter	Released: September 27, 2011 (US); Label: Reprise; Formats: CD, LP, DL	10	16	4	50	16	103	20	17	13	14	
Once More 'Round the Sun	Released: June 24, 2014 (US); Label: Reprise; Formats: CD, 2×LP, DL	6	3	1	32	10	38	16	5	7	10	
Emperor of Sand	Released: March 31, 2017; Label: Reprise; Formats: CD, 2×LP, DL	7	7	4	37	11	59	16	10	13	11	
Hushed and Grim	Released: October 29, 2021; Label: Reprise; Formats: 2×CD, 2×LP, DL	20	19	13	106	36	126	56	25	58	34	
Marrow Deep	Released: August 28, 2026; Label: Loma Vista; Formats: CD, 2×LP, DL	40	6	6	38	5	—	25	29	4	27	
"—" denotes a recording that did not chart or was not released in that territory.

=== Live albums ===
List of live albums, with selected chart positions
Title	Album details	Peak chart positions					
Title	Album details	US	US Hard Rock	US Rock	FIN	UK	UK Rock
Live at the Aragon	Released: March 15, 2011 (US); Label: Reprise; Formats: CD + DVD, 2×LP + DVD, DL	71	4	16	39	141	9
Live at Brixton	Released: December 10, 2013 (US); Label: Reprise; Formats: DL, 2×LP + DVD	—	—	—	—	—	—
"—" denotes a recording that did not chart or was not released in that territory.

=== Compilation albums ===
List of compilation albums
Title	Album details
Call of the Mastodon	Released: February 7, 2006 (US); Label: Relapse; Formats: CD, LP, DL
Mastodon	Released: November 11, 2008 (US); Label: Relapse; Formats: 9×LP box set
Medium Rarities	Released: September 11, 2020 (US); Label: Reprise; Formats: CD, 2×LP, DL

=== Demo albums ===
List of demo albums
Title	Album details
9 Song Demo	Released: 2000 (US); Label: self-released; Formats: CD-R

== Extended plays ==
List of extended plays, with selected chart positions
Title	Details	Peak chart positions									
Title	Details	US	US Hard Rock	US Rock	CAN	DEN	HUN	POR	SPA	SWI	UK Rock
Slick Leg	Released: 2001 (US); Label: Reptilian; Formats: 7"	—	—	—	—	—	—	—	—	—	—
Lifesblood	Released: August 21, 2001 (US); Label: Relapse; Formats: CD, 2×7"	—	—	—	—	11	—	—	—	—	—
March of the Fire Ants EP	Released: November 18, 2003 (US); Label: Relapse; Formats: CD (promo)	—	—	—	—	—	—	—	—	—	—
Oblivion EP	Released: November 4, 2009; Label: Reprise; Formats: DL	—	—	—	—	—	—	—	—	—	—
Jonah Hex: Revenge Gets Ugly	Released: June 29, 2010 (US); Label: Reprise; Formats: CD-R (promo), DL	—	22	—	—	—	—	—	—	—	—
Cold Dark Place	Released: September 22, 2017; Label: Reprise; Formats: CD, 10", DL	42	2	7	43	—	30	18	39	44	23
"—" denotes a recording that did not chart or was not released in that territory.

== Singles ==
List of singles, with selected chart positions, showing year released and album name
Title	Year	Peak chart positions										Album
Title	Year	US Sales	US Alt.	US Main. Rock	US Rock	CAN Rock	DEN	MEX Air.	SCO	UK	UK Rock	Album
"March of the Fire Ants"	2003	—	—	—	—	—	—	—	—	—	—	Remission
"Iron Tusk"	2004	—	—	—	—	—	—	—	—	—	—	Leviathan
"Naked Burn"	2004	—	—	—	—	—	—	—	—	—	—	Leviathan
"Blood and Thunder"	2005	—	—	—	—	—	—	—	—	—	—	Leviathan
"Crystal Skull"	2006	—	—	—	—	—	—	—	—	—	—	Blood Mountain
"Capillarian Crest"	2006	—	—	—	—	—	—	—	74	102	2	Blood Mountain
"Colony of Birchmen"	2006	—	—	33	—	—	—	—	—	—	—	Blood Mountain
"The Wolf Is Loose"	2006	—	—	—	—	—	15	—	63	122	4	Blood Mountain
"Sleeping Giant"	2007	—	—	—	—	—	—	—	—	—	—	Blood Mountain
"Divinations"	2009	14	—	—	—	—	—	—	—	—	40	Crack the Skye
"Oblivion"	2009	16	—	30	—	—	—	—	—	—	—	Crack the Skye
"Just Got Paid"	2009	13	—	—	—	—	—	—	—	—	—	Covered, A Revolution in Sound
"Deathbound"	2011	—	—	—	—	—	—	—	—	—	—	Adult Swim: Singles Program 2011
"Black Tongue"	2011	—	—	—	—	—	—	—	—	—	—	The Hunter
"Curl of the Burl"	2011	—	32	15	27	—	—	—	—	—	—	The Hunter
"Dry Bone Valley"	2012	—	—	22	—	—	—	—	—	—	—	The Hunter
"All the Heavy Lifting"	2012	—	—	—	—	—	—	—	—	—	—	The Hunter
"High Road"	2014	1	—	24	—	—	—	41	—	—	—	Once More 'Round the Sun
"Chimes at Midnight"	2014	—	—	—	—	—	—	—	—	—	—	Once More 'Round the Sun
"Atlanta" (featuring Gibby Haynes)	2014	—	—	—	—	—	—	—	—	—	—	Adult Swim: Singles Program 2014
"The Motherload"	2014	—	—	24	—	—	—	43	—	—	—	Once More 'Round the Sun
"Once More 'Round the Sun"	2014	—	—	—	—	—	—	—	—	—	—	Once More 'Round the Sun
"Asleep in the Deep"	2015	—	—	—	—	—	—	—	—	—	—	Once More 'Round the Sun
"White Walker"	2016	4	—	—	—	—	—	—	—	—	—	Catch the Throne: Volume II
"Sultan's Curse"	2017	—	—	—	—	—	—	—	—	—	—	Emperor of Sand
"Show Yourself"	2017	—	—	4	37	31	—	—	—	—	—	Emperor of Sand
"Steambreather"	2017	—	—	18	— (Note: "Steambreather" did not enter the Rock Songs chart, but peaked at number 45 on the Rock Airplay chart.)	—	—	—	—	—	—	Emperor of Sand
"Andromeda"	2017	—	—	—	—	—	—	—	—	—	—	Emperor of Sand
"Toe to Toes"	2017	—	—	—	—	—	—	—	—	—	—	Cold Dark Place
"Stairway to Nick John"	2019	—	—	—	—	—	—	—	—	—	—	non-album single
"Fallen Torches"	2020	—	—	—	—	—	—	—	—	—	—	Medium Rarities
"Pushing the Tides"	2021	—	—	—	—	—	—	—	—	—	—	Hushed and Grim
"Teardrinker"	2021	—	—	10	—	—	—	—	—	—	—	Hushed and Grim
"Sickle and Peace"	2021	—	—	—	—	—	—	—	—	—	—	Hushed and Grim
"Peace and Tranquility"	2022	—	—	29	—	—	—	—	—	—	—	Hushed and Grim
"Teardrinker" (Acoustic Version)	2022	—	—	—	—	—	—	—	—	—	—	non-album singles
"Floods of Triton" (with Lamb of God)	2024	—	—	—	—	—	—	—	—	—	—	non-album singles
"Your Ghost Again"	2026	—	—	—	—	—	—	—	—	—	—	Marrow Deep
"Snakes for Dinner"	2026	—	—	36	—	—	—	—	—	—	—	Marrow Deep
"—" denotes a recording that did not chart or was not released in that territory.

== Splits ==
List of split releases
Title	Details	Contribution(s)
High on Fire / Mastodon	Released: 2002; Label: Relapse; Format: 7"	"March of the Fire Ants"
Mastodon / American Heritage	Released: 2003; Label: Delboy; Format: 7"	"Emerald" (Thin Lizzy cover)
Avenged Sevenfold / Mastodon	Released: 2005; Label: Warner Bros.; Format: CD (promo)	"Blood and Thunder" "Iron Tusk"
Deftones & Mastodon Sampler	Released: 2007; Label: Reprise; Format: Mini CD (promo)	"Crystal Skull"
ZZ Top / Mastodon	Released: April 16, 2011; Label: Reprise; Format: 7"	"Just Got Paid" (ZZ Top cover)
Feistodon (with Feist)	Released: April 21, 2012; Label: Reprise; Format: 7", DL	"A Commotion" (Feist cover)
The Flaming Lips / Mastodon	Released: April 21, 2012; Label: Reprise; Format: 7"	"A Spoonful Weighs a Ton" (The Flaming Lips cover)
2014 Tour Sampler (with Gojira and Kvelertak)	Released: April 19, 2014; Label: Reprise, Roadrunner; Format: CD (promo)	"Curl of the Burl" (live)

== Guest appearances ==
List of non-single guest appearances, showing year released and album name
Title	Year	Album
"The Bit"	2005	We Reach: The Music of the Melvins
"Orion"	2006	Remastered: Metallica's Master of Puppets Revisited
"Cut You Up with a Linoleum Knife"	2007	Aqua Teen Hunger Force Colon Movie Film for Theaters Colon the Soundtrack
"Rufus Lives"	2020	Bill & Ted Face the Music: The Original Motion Picture Soundtrack
"Forged By Neron"	2021	Dark Nights: Death Metal Soundtrack

== Videography ==
=== Video albums ===
List of video albums, with selected chart positions
Title	Album details	Peak chart positions
Title	Album details	US Video
The Workhorse Chronicles	Released: February 21, 2006 (US); Label: Relapse; Formats: DVD	31

=== Music videos ===
List of music videos, showing year released and directors
Title	Year	Director(s)
"March of the Fire Ants"	2003	Chad Rullman
"Iron Tusk"	2004	Chad Rullman
"Blood and Thunder"	2005	Jonathan Rej, Tom Bingham
"Seabeast"	2006	Jonathan Rej, Tom Bingham
"The Wolf Is Loose"	2006	Jonathan Rej, Tom Bingham
"Colony of Birchmen"	2006	Jonathan Rej, Tom Bingham
"Capillarian Crest"	2006	Adam Rothlein
"Sleeping Giant"	2007	Roboshobo
"Divinations"	2009	Roboshobo
"Oblivion"	2009	Roboshobo
"Deathbound"	2011	Authority Films
"Curl of the Burl"	2011	Roboshobo
"Dry Bone Valley"	2012	Tim Biskup
"High Road"	2014	Roboshobo
"The Motherload"	2014	Jonathan Rej, Tom Bingham
"Asleep in the Deep"	2015	Skinner
"Show Yourself"	2017	Roboshobo
"Steambreather"	2017	Essy May, Stevie Gee
"Toe to Toes"	2017	Jimmy Hubbard
"Clandestiny"	2018	BlinkMyBrain
"Fallen Torches"	2020	Hey Beautiful Jerk, Machina-Infinitum
"Pushing the Tides"	2021	Lorenzo Diego Carrera
"Teardrinker"	2021	Lorenzo Diego Carrera
"More Than I Could Chew"	2022	Zev Deans
"Your Ghost Again"	2026	Errick Easterday
"Snakes for Dinner"	2026	DEATHCATS
"In The Ruins"	2026	Hey Beautiful Jerk

=== Guest appearances ===
List of video appearances, showing year released and release name
Song	Year	Compilation	Label	Notes
"March of the Fire Ants"	2004	Contamination Festival 2003	Relapse	Recorded live on January 18, 2003, at the Relapse Records Contamination Festival.
"Where Strides the Behemoth"	2004	Contamination Festival 2003	Relapse	Recorded live on January 18, 2003, at the Relapse Records Contamination Festival.
"Battle at Sea"	2004	Contamination Festival 2003	Relapse	Recorded live on January 18, 2003, at the Relapse Records Contamination Festival.
"Mother Puncher"	2004	Contamination Festival 2003	Relapse	Recorded live on January 18, 2003, at the Relapse Records Contamination Festival.
"Capillarian Crest"	2007	The Unholy Alliance: Chapter II Preaching To The Perverted	American	Recorded live on July 13, 2006, during the North American Unholy Alliance Tour.
"Crystal Skull"	2007	The Unholy Alliance: Chapter II Preaching To The Perverted	American	Recorded live on July 13, 2006, during the North American Unholy Alliance Tour.
"Blood and Thunder"	2007	The Unholy Alliance: Chapter II Preaching To The Perverted	American	Recorded live on July 13, 2006, during the North American Unholy Alliance Tour.
