= Mastodon (album) =

Box set by Mastodon
- Released: November 11, 2008
- Recorded: 2000–2006
- Genre: Sludge metal, progressive metal
- Producer: Matt Washburn, Matt Bayles, Mastodon

Mastodon chronology
The Workhorse Chronicles (2006)	Mastodon (2008)	Crack the Skye (2009)

Mastodon is 9×LP box set by the American heavy metal band of the same name. It features all of their material released by Relapse Records plus Blood Mountain which was originally released on Reprise Records. The set is limited to 1,000 copies and all records were pressed on 180-gram vinyl.

== Content ==
The box set contains the following audio:

- Lifesblood
- Remission
- Live from the Relapse Contamination Festival 2003 (previously unreleased)
- Leviathan (includes cover versions of Thin Lizzy's "Emerald", Melvins' "The Bit" and Metallica's "Orion")
- Call of the Mastodon
- Blood Mountain

Also included are:

- Mastodon turntable slip-mat
- Patch
- Sticker set

== Personnel ==
Mastodon

- Brann Dailor – drums, vocals on "Battle at Sea"
- Brent Hinds – guitar, vocals
- Bill Kelliher – guitar
- Troy Sanders – bass, vocals

Others

- Matt Washburn – production, editing, mixing, mastering
- Matt Bayles – production, engineering
