= The Workhorse Chronicles =

Video by Mastodon
- Released: February 21, 2006
- Recorded: 2000–2005
- Genre: Sludge metal, progressive metal
- Length: 183:34 (approx. 3 hours)
- Label: Relapse
- Director: Denise Korycki
- Producer: Denise Korycki

Mastodon chronology
Call of the Mastodon (2006)	The Workhorse Chronicles (2006)	Mastodon (2008)

The Workhorse Chronicles is a DVD by American metal band Mastodon chronicling the first half-decade of the band's history. It was released on February 21, 2006 through Relapse Records.

== Content ==
The DVD is divided into three sections. The first section is a documentary featuring interviews with Mastodon's members that discusses the band's formation and previous bands its members had played in. The second section consists of 28 live performances recorded from 2000 to 2005 and includes rare footage of the band in their initial form as a five-piece. The third section features the band's first three music videos – "March of the Fire Ants", "Blood and Thunder", and "Iron Tusk" – as well as a featurette on the creation of the videos.

== Track listing ==
The Evolution of Mastodon

1. "Introduction to Mastodon"
2. "Profiling Mastodon"
3. "Pre-Mastodon"
4. "Formation of Mastodon"
5. "Mastodon Environment"
6. "Roar of Mastodon"

Live performances

7. "Deep Sea Creature" (May 2000, Tallahassee, FL)
8. "Slick Leg" (May 2000, Tallahassee, FL)
9. "Thank You For This" (2002, Atlanta, GA)
10. "Call of the Mastodon" (May 2000, Tallahassee, FL)
11. "Shadows That Move" (Summer 2001, Baltimore, MD)
12. "Battle at Sea" (Summer 2002, Baltimore, MD)
13. "Hail To Fire" (April 2005, Los Angeles, CA)
14. "We Built This Come Death" (2002, Atlanta GA)
15. "Welcoming War" (Summer 2002, Baltimore, MD)
16. "Burning Man" (2002, Atlanta GA)
17. "Crusher Destroyer" (May 2005, Atlanta, GA)
18. "March of the Fire Ants" (April 2005, Los Angeles, CA)
19. "Mother Puncher" (Summer 2005, With Full Force Festival, Germany)
20. "Ol’e Nessie" (2002, Atlanta, GA)
21. "Trainwreck" (January 2001, Atlanta, GA)
22. "Trampled Under Hoof" (2002, Atlanta, GA)
23. "Trilobite" (May 2003, Memphis, TN)
24. "Where Strides the Behemoth" (September 2005, Atlanta, GA)
25. "Workhorse" (2004, Hellfest)
26. "Megalodon" (May 2005, Atlanta, GA)
27. "Aqua Dementia" (Summer 2005, Denver, CO)
28. "Blood and Thunder" (September 2005, Atlanta, GA)
29. "Hearts Alive" (April 2005, Los Angeles, CA)
30. "I Am Ahab" (September 2005, Atlanta, GA)
31. "Iron Tusk" (May 2005, Atlanta, GA)
32. "Ísland" (September 2005, Atlanta, GA)
33. "Naked Burn" (February 2004, Philadelphia, PA)
34. "Seabeast" (June 2004, London, UK)

The Videos

35. "Creating the Videos"
36. "March of the Fire Ants" (Extended Version)
37. "Iron Tusk" (Uncensored Version)
38. "Blood and Thunder"

Notes

- Tracks 7–15 appear on 9 Song Demo (self-released, 2000) and Call of the Mastodon (Relapse, 2006)
  - Tracks 7–9 also appear on Slick Leg (Reptilian, 2001)
  - Tracks 11–15 also appear on Lifesblood (Relapse, 2001)
- Tracks 16–25 appear on Remission (Relapse, 2002)
- Tracks 26–34 appear on Leviathan (Relapse, 2004)

== Personnel ==
Mastodon

- Brann Dailor – drums
- Brent Hinds – guitar, vocals
- Bill Kelliher – guitar
- Troy Sanders – bass, vocals
- Eric Saner – vocals (tracks 7, 8, and 10)
