= Oblivion EP =

EP by Mastodon
- Released: November 4, 2009
- Genre: Progressive metal, sludge metal
- Length: 27:01
- Label: Reprise

Mastodon chronology
Crack the Skye (2009)	Oblivion EP (2009)	Jonah Hex: Revenge Gets Ugly EP (2010)

Oblivion EP is an EP by American heavy metal band Mastodon. It was released via the Internet on November 4, 2009, and is only for sale in digital format. The song "The Bit" is a Melvins cover.

== Track listing ==
All tracks are written by Mastodon

No.	Title	Length
1.	"Oblivion" (Studio Version)	5:46
2.	"Divinations" (Live at XFM)	3:21
3.	"The Bit" (Live at XFM)	4:55
4.	"Colony of Birchmen" (Live at XFM)	3:59
5.	"Oblivion" (Music Video)	5:11
6.	"Divinations" (Music Video)	3:49

== Credits ==
- Brann Dailor − drums, vocals
- Brent Hinds − guitar, vocals
- Bill Kelliher − guitar
- Troy Sanders − bass, vocals
