= Workhorse (disambiguation) =

Workhorse may refer to:

- Draft horse, horses used for heavy work
- Workhorse Group, company making electric vehicles
- Workhorse (film), 2019 Canadian documentary film about logging with horses
- Workhorse Queen, 2021 documentary film about a drag queen
- The Workhorse Chronicles, 2006 DVD by American metal band Mastodon
