= Call of the Mastodon =

Compilation album by Mastodon
- Released: February 7, 2006
- Recorded: 2000
- Studio: LedBelly Sound Studio
- Genres: Sludge metal; progressive metal; metalcore
- Length: 28:12
- Label: Relapse
- Producer: Matt Washburn

Mastodon chronology
Leviathan (2004)	Call of the Mastodon (2006)	Blood Mountain (2006)

Professional ratings
Review scores
Source	Rating
Allmusic	3.5/5 stars
Pitchfork Media	7.3/10 stars

Call of the Mastodon is a compilation album of early recordings from the American metal band Mastodon. It was released on February 7, 2006, by Relapse Records.

== History ==
The songs on Call of the Mastodon originally appeared on Mastodon's first release, 9 Song Demo, with lead vocals by Eric Saner. After Saner left the band, the vocals were re-recorded by guitarist Brent Hinds and bassist Troy Sanders, and the updated songs appeared on the band's Slick Leg and Lifesblood EPs. Several years later, the songs (with Hinds' and Sanders' vocals) were remixed and remastered by original engineer Matt Washburn, and released as Call of the Mastodon.

In a documentary on the making of Crack the Skye, Hinds referred to Call of the Mastodon as the band's first studio album; this sentiment was later echoed by guitarist Bill Kelliher when he appeared on Loudwire's 'Wikipedia: Fact or Fiction'.

== Track listing ==
All tracks are written by Mastodon.

No.	Title	Length
1.	"Shadows That Move"	3:36
2.	"Welcoming War"	2:47
3.	"Thank You for This"	1:39
4.	"We Built This Come Death"	2:06
5.	"Hail to Fire"	2:00
6.	"Battle at Sea"	4:14
7.	"Deep Sea Creature"	4:40
8.	"Slickleg"	3:31
9.	"Call of the Mastodon"	3:39
Total length:		28:12

Japanese edition bonus track
No.	Title	Length
10.	"Where Strides the Behemoth" (live)	3:08

== Personnel ==
Mastodon

- Brann Dailor – drums, vocals on "Battle at Sea"
- Brent Hinds – guitar, vocals
- Bill Kelliher – guitar
- Troy Sanders – bass, vocals

Production

- Matt Washburn – recording, mixing, mastering
- Paul A. Romano – artwork and design

== Charts ==
Chart (2006)	Peak position
US Heatseekers Albums (Billboard)	38
US Independent Albums (Billboard)	42
