= Blood Mountain (album) =

Studio album by Mastodon
- Released: September 12, 2006
- Recorded: December 2005 – April 2006
- Studio: Robert Lang Studios, Studio Litho, and EK Studios, Seattle, Washington
- Genre: Progressive metal; sludge metal
- Length: 50:56; 68:10 (CD with hidden message)
- Label: Reprise; Relapse
- Producer: Matt Bayles; Mastodon

Mastodon chronology
Call of the Mastodon (2006)	Blood Mountain (2006)	Crack the Skye (2009)

Singles from Blood Mountain
- 1. "Crystal Skull"/"Capillarian Crest" Released: August 8, 2006; 2. "The Wolf Is Loose" Released: November 2006; 3. "Colony of Birchmen" Released: March 12, 2007; 4. "Sleeping Giant" Released: 2007

Blood Mountain is the third full-length studio album and major label debut by American heavy metal band Mastodon. The recording of the album finished in April 2006 and it was released on September 12, 2006, in the UK and North America through Reprise Records. The album in full could be streamed at the band's MySpace page a few days prior to the release.

Like Mastodon's previous studio work Leviathan, Blood Mountain is a concept album. According to bassist Troy Sanders, "It's about climbing up a mountain and the different things that can happen to you when you're stranded on a mountain, in the woods, and you're lost. You're starving, hallucinating, running into strange creatures. You're being hunted. It's about that whole struggle." Guitarist Bill Kelliher considers this album to represent the earth element. At the time, bassist Troy Sanders called it "sonically the best album we have done." The band continued to shift the emphasis to clean, melodic vocals from the harsher vocals used on their early work.

The album includes guest appearances by Scott Kelly of Neurosis on "Crystal Skull", Josh Homme of Queens of the Stone Age on "Colony of Birchmen", as well as keyboard player Isaiah "Ikey" Owens of The Mars Volta and singer Cedric Bixler-Zavala of At the Drive-In and The Mars Volta on "Pendulous Skin" and "Siberian Divide", respectively.

== Story notes ==
- The main character is in search of a crystal skull that he hopes to place at the top of Blood Mountain. In the making of DVD, the Crystal Skull is supposed to remove "the reptilian brain" causing its owner to achieve the next step of human evolution.
- In an interview with bass guitarist Troy Sanders it was revealed that a Cysquatch is "a one-eyed Sasquatch that can see into the future." The Cysquatch warns the main character of various dangers during his journey for the Crystal Skull.
- Several of the lyrics in "The Wolf is Loose" refer to chapter titles and themes in Joseph Campbell's The Hero With a Thousand Faces. The main character may be an example of a monomythical hero.

== Track details ==
In earlier pressings, the album's last song, "Pendulous Skin", contains a secret "fan letter" from Josh Homme, who provided guest vocals on the album. At minute 21:25, he says: "Dear Mastodon: My name is Joshua. I'm a big fan from Southern Cal. Really diggin' on your new scene. That's why I hope you don't mind when I got your new demos for your new CD, I had to sing parts on them and send them to you as a tribute. I hope you're not mad about me also uploading them onto the Internet. But hell, it seems like you guys are so cool that you might dig something just like that. Sincerely, your fan, Joshua M. Homme. P.S., Keep it real...REAL (studio effects are used)....*laughter*....REAL." When asked about the message in a Pitchfork Media interview, Homme said, "I was just fucking with them. Then they asked if they could put that on the end of their record, and I was like, 'Yeah.' I did the vocal [for "Colony of Birchmen"] and sent it back to them, and that message was before the song started." The song itself ends at 5:03, followed by over 16 minutes of silence, then Homme's message.

The title "Colony of Birchmen" is an homage to the song "The Colony of Slippermen" by progressive rock group Genesis, whom the band's drummer, Brann Dailor, has been known to appreciate.

The band made music videos for "The Wolf Is Loose", "Colony of Birchmen", "Sleeping Giant" and "Capillarian Crest". Although the video for "Capillarian Crest" is made up of live footage, the video features the studio version of the song. The track "Sleeping Giant" is available as downloadable content for Guitar Hero III: Legends of Rock, and "Colony of Birchmen" is an on-disc track in Rock Band 2.

== Critical reception ==
Professional ratings
Aggregate scores
Source	Rating
Metacritic	82/100
Review scores
Source	Rating
AbsolutePunk	93%
AllMusic	4/5 stars
The A.V. Club	A
Blabbermouth	8/10
Drowned in Sound	10/10
The Guardian	1/5 stars
The Observer	4/5 stars
Pitchfork	8.7/10
PopMatters	10/10
Rolling Stone	4/5 stars

Blood Mountain was released to high critical praise. At Metacritic, which assigns a rating out of 100 to reviews from mainstream critics, the album has received a score of 82, based on 24 reviews. Total Guitar magazine voted it Number One album of 2006, and magazines such as Metal Hammer and Kerrang! thought it as good as the band's previous album Leviathan, if not better. The album has also charted in many websites and magazines 2006 countdowns.

Blood Mountain was voted the best album of 2006 in the UK Metal Hammer magazine end-of year polls, as well as top in Total Guitar magazine's top 50 albums of 2006. It was also rated the 17th greatest metal album of all time by a countdown carried out by gaming website IGN in 2010.

In 2006, the album was nominated for a Danish Metal Award for Best International Metal album, but the award eventually went to Satyricon's Now Diabolical. That same year, the song "Colony of Birchmen" was nominated for a Grammy Award for Best Metal Performance, but lost to Slayer's Eyes of the Insane.

== Commercial performance ==
Blood Mountain entered the Billboard 200 best selling album charts at No. 32, with 24,000 copies sold, making it the third highest debut in the band's career (behind Crack the Skye and The Hunter). The album is also one of the band's highest selling records to date. By December 2006, the album had sold more than 65,000 copies in the U.S. alone according to the band's website; by March 2009, the album had sold 150,000 copies in the U.S. according to Nielsen Soundscan, and by September 2010 it had sold 176,000 copies.

== Track listing ==
All tracks are written by Mastodon.

No.	Title	Length
1.	"The Wolf Is Loose"	3:34
2.	"Crystal Skull" (featuring Scott Kelly)	3:27
3.	"Sleeping Giant"	5:36
4.	"Capillarian Crest"	4:25
5.	"Circle of Cysquatch"	3:20
6.	"Bladecatcher"	3:20
7.	"Colony of Birchmen" (featuring Josh Homme)	4:20
8.	"Hunters of the Sky"	3:52
9.	"Hand of Stone"	3:30
10.	"This Mortal Soil"	5:00
11.	"Siberian Divide" (featuring Cedric Bixler-Zavala)	5:32
12.	"Pendulous Skin" (featuring Isaiah "Ikey" Owens; extended to 22:16 on CD pressings*, with 16:20 of silence before a hidden message by Josh Homme)	5:06
Total length:		50:56; *68:10

== Personnel ==
Mastodon

- Brann Dailor – drums, backing vocals
- Brent Hinds – lead guitar, vocals, rhythm guitar on "Sleeping Giant"
- Bill Kelliher – rhythm guitar, lead guitar on "Sleeping Giant", backing vocals
- Troy Sanders – bass, vocals

Guest musicians

- Scott Kelly – additional vocals and lyrics on "Crystal Skull"
- Josh Homme – guest vocals on "Colony of Birchmen"
- Cedric Bixler-Zavala – guest vocals on "Siberian Divide"
- Isaiah "Ikey" Owens – keyboards on "Pendulous Skin"
- Jennifer Ellison – cello on "Sleeping Giant"
- Nicola Shangrow – violin on "Sleeping Giant"
- Erica Brewer – violin on "Sleeping Giant"

Production

- Matt Bayles – producer, recording engineer
- Ben Verelien – assistant engineer
- Chris Common – studio drum tech
- Rich Costey – mixing
- Pablo Arraya – mixing assistant
- Jim Keller – mixing assistant, additional transitions
- Vlado Meller – mastering
- Mark Santangelo – mastering assistant
- Doug Hill – recording of Scott Kelly vocals
- Alain Moschulski – engineering for Josh Homme vocals
- Jonathon Debaun – engineering for Cedric Bixler-Zavala vocals
- Eric Searle – pre-production
- Michael Green – pre-production

== Charts ==
Chart (2006)	Peak position
Australian Albums (ARIA)	44
Belgian Albums (Ultratop Flanders)	59
Belgian Alternative Albums (Ultratop Flanders)	36
Canadian Albums (Nielsen SoundScan)	40
French Albums (SNEP)	138
German Albums (Offizielle Top 100)	96
Irish Albums (IRMA)	41
Norwegian Albums (VG-lista)	20
Scottish Albums (OCC)	39
Swedish Albums (Sverigetopplistan)	34
UK Albums (OCC)	46
UK Rock & Metal Albums (OCC)	2
US Billboard 200	32
US Indie Store Album Sales (Billboard)	6
US Top Rock Albums (Billboard)	15

== Certifications ==
Region	Certification	Certified units/sales
United Kingdom (BPI)	Silver	60,000^{‡}
^{‡} Sales+streaming figures based on certification alone.
