= Lifesblood =

EP by Mastodon
- Released: August 21, 2001 (CD); August 31, 2004 (Vinyl)
- Recorded: 2000
- Studio: LedBelly Sound Studio
- Genres: Sludge metal; progressive metal; metalcore
- Length: 15:37
- Label: Relapse
- Producer: Matt Washburn

Mastodon chronology
Slick Leg (2001)	Lifesblood (2001)	Remission (2002)

Professional ratings
Review scores
Source	Rating
Allmusic	3/5 stars

Lifesblood is the second EP by American metal band Mastodon. It was released on CD in 2001 and vinyl in 2004 by Relapse Records. The title Lifesblood is derived from a lyric in the song "Trampled Under Hoof", which appears on their debut album, Remission.

Since the EP was only printed for a limited time, it has become rare and sought after by Mastodon fans. The limited prints come in a variety of colors, each with a certain amount produced: 100 clear, 500 red, 500 black, and a second press of 500 blue and black.

== Content ==
Lifesblood features five songs from Mastodon's first release, 9 Song Demo, with re-recorded vocals and newly added samples. The tracks later appeared on the compilation album Call of the Mastodon.

The sample at the beginning of "Shadows That Move" is from the film One Flew Over the Cuckoo's Nest. The sample at the beginning of "Hail to Fire" is from the autobiographical film The Dancin' Outlaw by Jesco "Jesse" White. The samples at the beginning of "We Built This Come Death" and "Battle at Sea" are taken from recordings of the Nuremberg trials.

The cover artwork features an image of a rebis.

== Track listing ==
All tracks are written by Mastodon.

No.	Title	Length
1.	"Shadows That Move"	3:53
2.	"Welcoming War"	2:46
3.	"We Built This Come Death"	2:29
4.	"Hail to Fire"	2:12
5.	"Battle at Sea"	4:13
Total length:		15:37

== Personnel ==
Mastodon

- Brann Dailor − drums
- Brent Hinds − guitar, vocals
- Bill Kelliher − guitar
- Troy Sanders − bass, vocals

Production

- Matt Washburn – recording, mixing, mastering
- Paul Romano – artwork, design
- Jonathan Canady – cover artwork
- Mayfield Williams – photography

== Charts ==
Chart (2005)	Peak position
Danish Albums (Hitlisten)	11
