= Mastodon (band) =

American heavy metal band

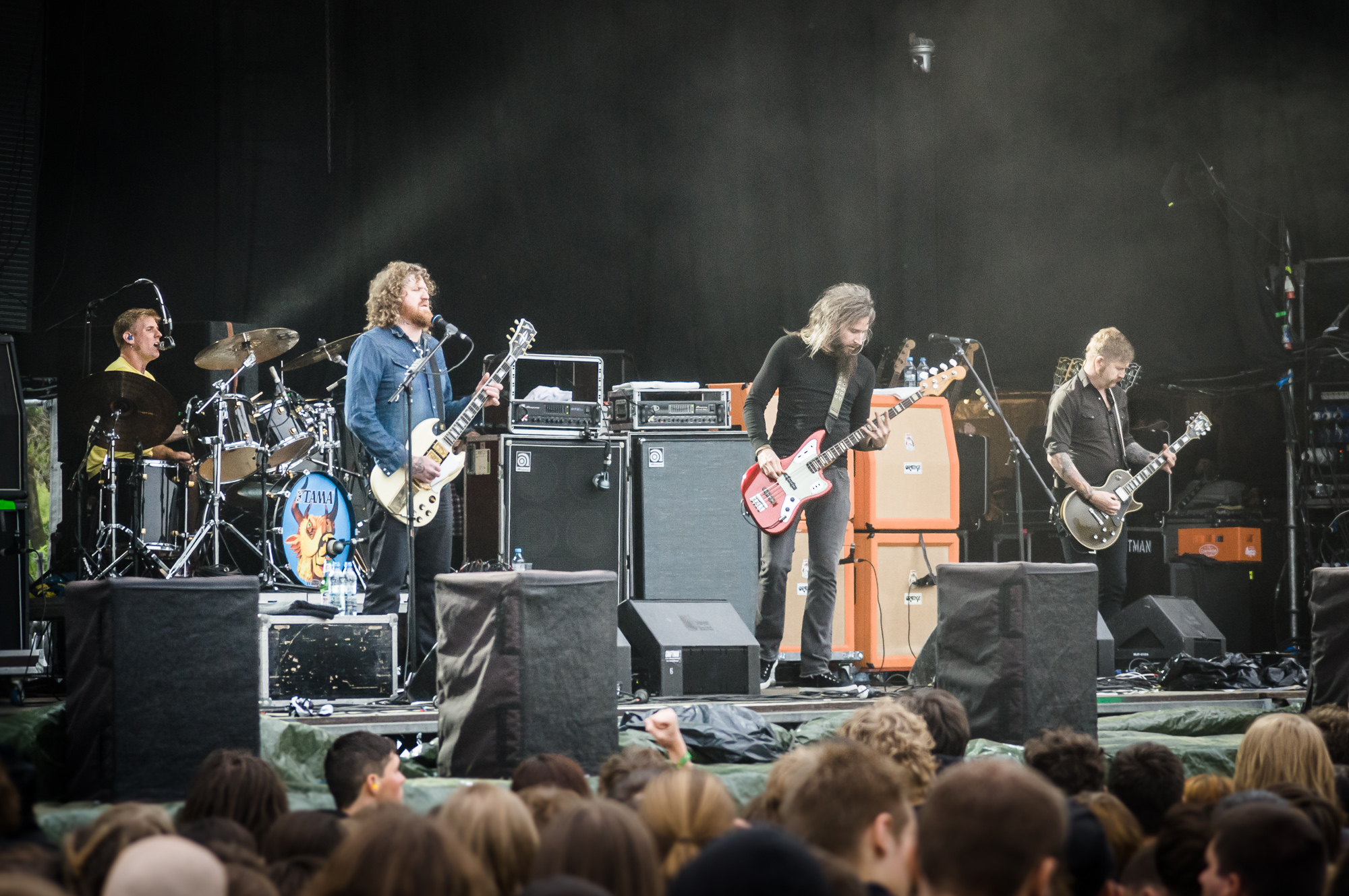
- Mastodon's original lineup performing in 2012. L–R: Brann Dailor, Brent Hinds, Troy Sanders, Bill Kelliher

Background information
- Origin: Atlanta, Georgia, U.S.
- Genres: Progressive metal; sludge metal; stoner metal; alternative metal; metalcore (early)
- Years active: 2000–present
- Labels: Loma Vista; Reprise; Warner; Roadrunner; Sire; Relapse
- Members: Brann Dailor; Bill Kelliher; Troy Sanders; João Nogueira; Nick Johnston
- Past members: Brent Hinds; Eric Saner
- Website: mastodonrocks.com

Mastodon is an American heavy metal band from Atlanta, Georgia. Formed in 2000, the band's lineup of Troy Sanders (bass/vocals), Brent Hinds (lead guitar/vocals), Bill Kelliher (rhythm guitar/backing vocals), and Brann Dailor (drums/vocals) remained unchanged for 24 years. Hinds departed Mastodon in March 2025, and died five months later in a motorcycle accident in Atlanta, Georgia.

The band's 2002 debut album, Remission, garnered significant critical acclaim for its unique sound. Mastodon's second full-length release, Leviathan, is a concept album based on the novel Moby-Dick by Herman Melville. Three magazines awarded the record "Album of the Year" in 2004: Revolver, Kerrang! and Terrorizer. The song "Colony of Birchmen" from the band's third album (released in 2006), Blood Mountain, was nominated for a Grammy Award for Best Metal Performance in 2007. Blood Mountain was followed in 2009 by Crack the Skye, and in 2011 by The Hunter, which debuted at No. 10 on the Billboard 200 chart and achieved major commercial success in the United States. The Hunter features the song "Curl of the Burl", which was nominated for a Grammy Award for Best Hard Rock/Metal Performance in 2012.

Mastodon's 2014 album Once More 'Round the Sun peaked at No. 6 on the Billboard 200 chart and features the band's third Grammy-nominated song, "High Road". The band's seventh album, Emperor of Sand, was released in 2017 and features the band's most commercially successful song to date, "Show Yourself", which peaked at No. 4 on the US Billboard Mainstream Rock Songs chart. The album's opening track, "Sultan's Curse", earned the band its first Grammy Award. Emperor of Sand was also the band's first album to receive a Grammy nomination; it was nominated for Best Rock Album. Mastodon's last album with Hinds, Hushed and Grim, was released in 2021. The most recent Mastodon album, Marrow Deep, was released in August 2026.

Mastodon has released nine studio albums and numerous other releases. In 2016, the staff of Loudwire named them the 20th-best metal band of all time.

== History ==
=== Formation, early years, and Remission (2000–2003) ===
Mastodon was formed on January 13, 2000, after drummer Brann Dailor and guitarist Bill Kelliher moved from their home state of New York to Atlanta, Georgia, and met bassist Troy Sanders and guitarist Brent Hinds at a High on Fire show. Dailor and Kelliher previously played in Lethargy and had performed on the Today Is the Day album In the Eyes of God, while Sanders and Hinds had played together in a band called Four Hour Fogger. The four men discovered they had a mutual appreciation of sludge metal bands Melvins and Neurosis, heavy metal legends Iron Maiden, and 1970s hard rockers Thin Lizzy, and began working on music together shortly thereafter. In a 2009 interview, Kelliher revealed that the first time Hinds attended a practice with the band, he "showed up so wasted he couldn't play".

The band recorded a nine-song demo in June 2000, which featured Eric Saner on vocals, and they sold it to fans at early shows. Their first concert was at the Dixie Taverne in New Orleans. After just a few months, Saner left the band for personal reasons, and the vocals from 9 Song Demo were re-recorded by Hinds and Sanders. In 2001, Reptilian Records released a 7" picture disc containing three of the revamped tracks. That same year, Mastodon landed a record deal with Relapse Records, and five more of the updated songs were released as the Lifesblood EP.

Mastodon's first studio album, Remission, was released on May 28, 2002. It featured the song "Crusher/Destroyer" (which was included on the Tony Hawk's Underground soundtrack) and the band's first single, "March of the Fire Ants". Coinciding with a music video for "March of the Fire Ants", a deluxe edition of Remission was released in October 2003. This version of the album contained a cover of the Thin Lizzy song "Emerald" and a bonus DVD featuring a professionally filmed live set recorded at The Masquerade in Atlanta.

=== Leviathan and Call of the Mastodon (2004–2005) ===
Brent Hinds, Troy Sanders, and Brann Dailor in 2004

The band's second full-length album, Leviathan, was released in 2004; it's a concept album loosely based on Herman Melville's novel Moby-Dick. The band received critical acclaim for Leviathan and the record was named album of the year by Kerrang! and Terrorizer. "Blood and Thunder", which featured Clutch vocalist Neil Fallon, was chosen as one of the most important recordings of the decade by National Public Radio in November 2009; National Public radio coverage described the entire album as epitomizing "a phenomenal decade for metal". Leviathan also ranked second in a list by Metal Hammer of the best albums of 2004.

The band went on tour in support of the album, playing throughout North America and Europe in The Unholy Alliance Tour along with Slayer and Lamb of God and later on with Slipknot.

"Iron Tusk", the fifth track on the album, can be found on the soundtrack of the skateboarding video game Tony Hawk's American Wasteland and in 2K Sports video game NHL 2K9. "Blood and Thunder" is featured in the video games Need for Speed: Most Wanted, Project Gotham Racing 3 and Saints Row, as well as Japanese music games GuitarFreaks and DrumMania V2, and was added as a playable track on all instruments in Guitar Hero: Metallica. It has also been released as downloadable content for Rock Band 3, with Pro Guitar support also available at extra cost.

Leviathan was followed by the 2006 release of Call of the Mastodon, a remastered collection of the band's first nine songs, as well as a DVD of interviews and concert footage called The Workhorse Chronicles that includes material from the band's early days as a five-piece. The band has stated that they consider Call of the Mastodon to be their first studio album, as its songs were recorded and released prior to Remission. These two releases were the band's last for Relapse Records, as they would later go on to sign with Warner Bros. Mastodon also recorded a cover version of Metallica's "Orion" for a 2006 Kerrang! tribute album marking the 20th anniversary of the release of Master of Puppets.

=== Blood Mountain (2006–2008) ===
The band's third studio album, Blood Mountain, was released on September 12, 2006, followed by a tour to support the album along with Tool in Europe and Slayer in Australia and New Zealand. The Mars Volta frontman Cedric Bixler-Zavala lent his vocals to the track "Siberian Divide". Queens of the Stone Age frontman Josh Homme contributed vocals for the song "Colony of Birchmen". The band performed the song "Colony of Birchmen" on NBC's Late Night with Conan O'Brien on November 1, their first appearance on network television, to a viewing audience of around 2.4 million people.

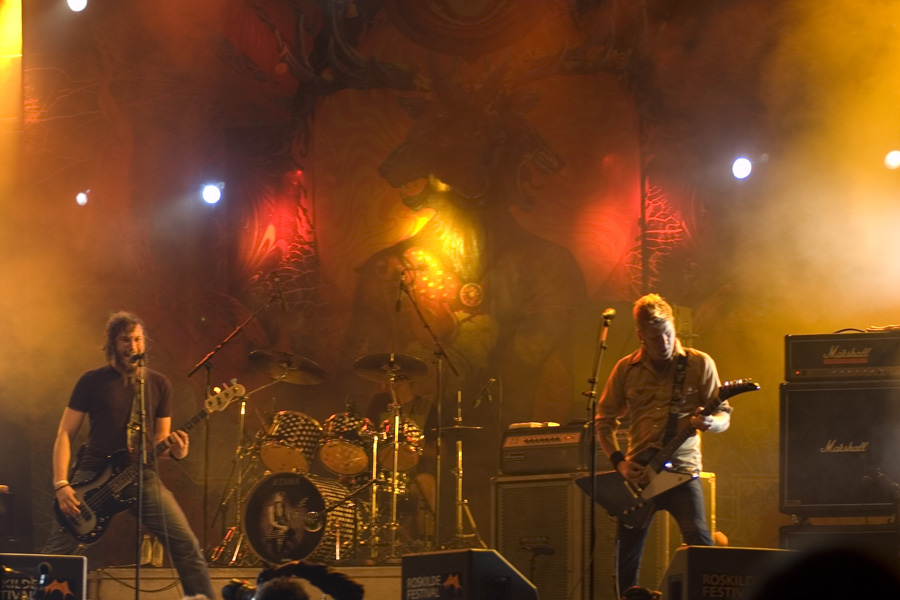
Mastodon live at Roskilde Festival 2007

The band's first single from Blood Mountain, "Capillarian Crest", was ranked No. 27 in Rolling Stone Magazine's Top 100 Songs of 2006. The album itself was ranked ninth in the magazine's best albums of the year chart. The UK's Metal Hammer voted it the best album of 2006 in its end of year critic's poll. The album was voted in at No. 5 by Kerrang! in its end-of-year list, as well as No. 6 and No. 1, respectively, on PopMatters' Best Albums of 2006 and Best Metal Albums of 2006 lists. About.com rated it the top metal album of 2006. Blood Mountain was also named best album of 2006 in the 10th-anniversary birthday edition (issue 119) of Bizarre. It also came in at No. 2 on Revolver magazine's list of the top albums of 2006. The band was named Artist of the Month for March 2007 at Gametap.com.

Mastodon toured and played numerous shows during this time. The band joined Against Me! and Cursive for a North American tour, with Planes Mistaken for Stars opening for one leg and These Arms Are Snakes the other. A performance in Milwaukee had to be canceled due to illness on the part of Brent Hinds. Mastodon would play the Hove Festival in Norway as well as on the Main Stage of the Download Festival and then the Pitchfork Music Festival. During this time, the band opened for Metallica on the Sick of the Studio tour. The band also played at the 2007 Dubai Desert Rock Festival, the 2008 Bonnaroo Music Festival, and the inaugural Mayhem Festival. Mastodon then toured with Slayer, Trivium, Lamb of God and several other metal bands in 2008 for The Unholy Alliance Tour.

The band performed "Colony of Birchmen" at the 2007 MTV Video Music Awards live with Josh Homme. After the televised performance, Brent Hinds was reported to have sustained a severe head injury. Blabbermouth.net initially reported that it was the result of a brutal assault, but the police report later suggested that an inebriated Hinds had started a fight with System of a Down bassist Shavo Odadjian and vocalist William Hudson, also known as Reverend William Burke of Achozen.

"Sleeping Giant" was made available as a downloadable song for Guitar Hero III: Legends of Rock, "Colony of Birchmen" was included on Harmonix's Rock Band 2 and Volition's Saints Row 2, and "Divinations" was featured in Madden NFL 10 and Saints Row: The Third. Mastodon contributed a cover version of Harry Nilsson's "One" to the video game Army of Two's advertisement campaign. The band members are fans of Aqua Teen Hunger Force and in 2007, Mastodon performed the opening song of Aqua Teen Hunger Force Colon Movie Film for Theaters, "Cut You Up with a Linoleum Knife".

=== Crack the Skye and Live at the Aragon (2009–2010) ===
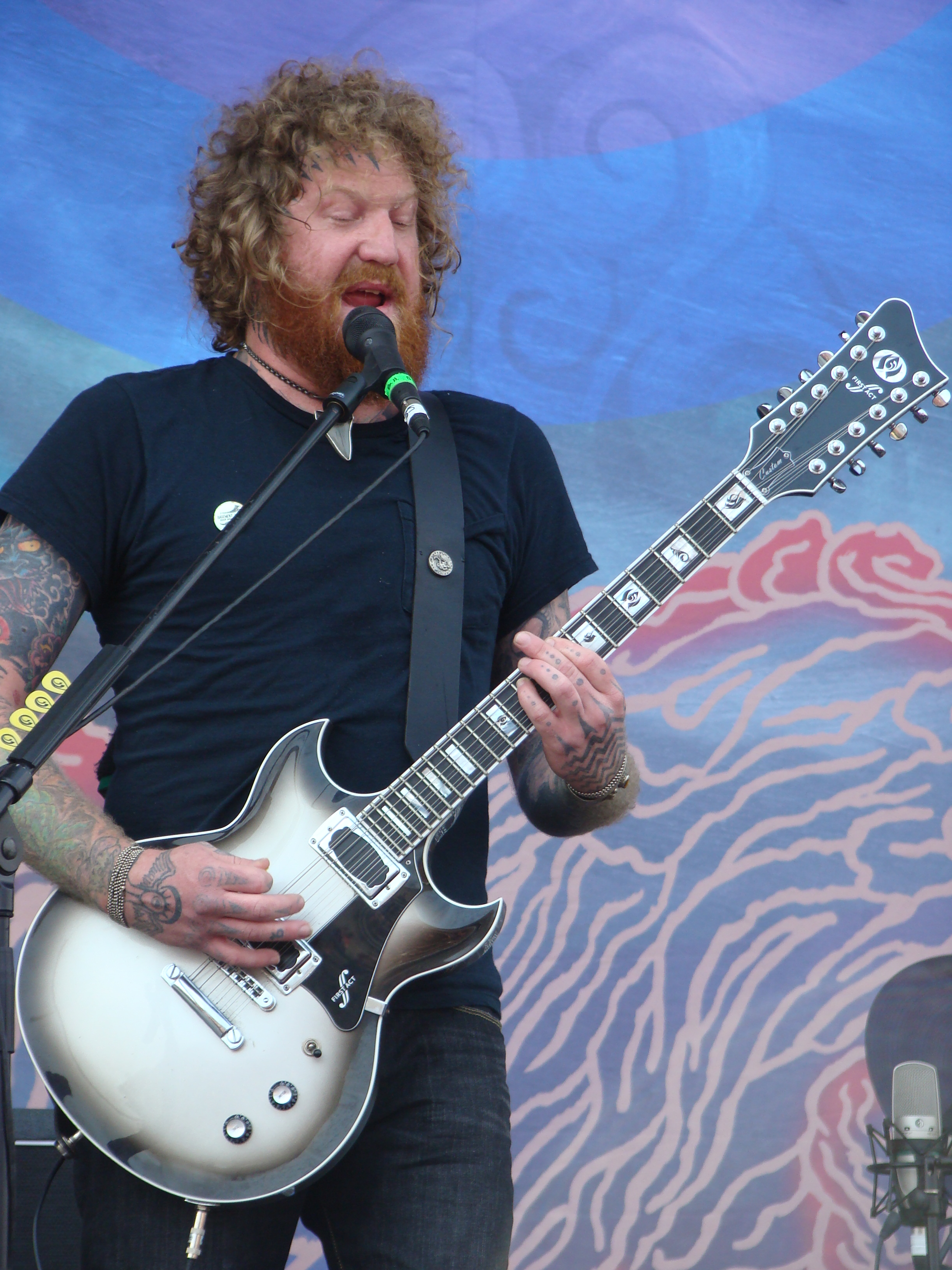
Brent Hinds performing in 2009

Crack the Skye was released on March 24, 2009, as a normal version and a deluxe version (which includes all songs in instrumental versions as well as their normal versions) and entered the Billboard 200 at number 11 a week later. The album was produced by Brendan O'Brien and Scott Kelly of Neurosis returns as a guest musician on the title-track.

In a MusicRadar interview, guitarist Bill Kelliher confirmed the album is about an "out-of-body experience", and looks at the concepts of astral travel, wormholes, Stephen Hawking's theories and the spiritual realm. The album follows a quadriplegic who learns astral projection. On his journey he flies too close to the sun, burning his umbilical cord which connects him to his body, and flies into oblivion. At the same time in Czarist Russia, Rasputin and his cult were channeling spirits and brought the quadriplegic to their time. He explains his situation and foretells the assassination of Rasputin. Inevitably Rasputin is assassinated and Rasputin guides him back to his body. The band had debuted three new tracks at the Bonnaroo Music Festival, but did not play any more live shows before the album's release, due to fears of internet distribution and wanting to play the songs to the right audience. Drummer Brann Dailor sings lead vocals for the verses of the song "Oblivion".

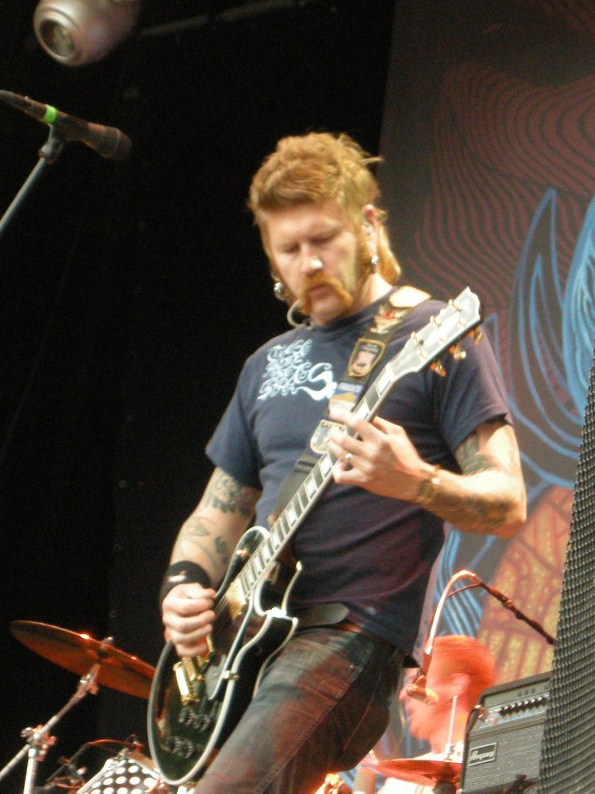
Bill Kelliher live at Sonisphere Festival in 2009

Mastodon was a headliner at the Scion Rock Fest on February 28, 2009, performing a set containing three tracks from Crack the Skye, the first time these songs were played since being finalized and recorded. On May 15, 2009, Mastodon performed a shortened version of "Oblivion" on the Late Show with David Letterman. Introducing the band, David Letterman said: "Our next guests are a Grammy-nominated rock and roll band from Atlanta, and I won't lie to you: I'm frightened." The camera then comedically cut to a close-up of Brent Hinds' face tattoo. In support of their new album, Mastodon toured with Metallica on the latter part of the 2009 European leg of their World Magnetic Tour. In Fall of 2009, they embarked with Dethklok on the "Adult Swim Presents" tour along with Converge and High on Fire. On October 17, 2009, they recorded a DVD documenting the tour at the Aragon Ballroom in Chicago. Mastodon played the alternative music festival Big Day Out, touring across Australia and New Zealand in January and February 2010. On November 4, 2009, Mastodon released their third EP, titled Oblivion.

Mastodon headlined a spring 2010 tour with supporting acts Between the Buried and Me, Baroness and Valient Thorr. On April 29, Baroness guitarists John Baizley and Pete Adams filled in for Bill Kelliher when he was unable to perform due to illness. Mastodon canceled a summer tour but resumed performing with Deftones and Alice in Chains in September. The tour was called Blackdiamondskye, a portmanteau of the three bands' latest albums (Black Gives Way to Blue, Diamond Eyes, and Crack the Skye), and it took place in the United States and Canada.

Film director Jimmy Hayward contacted the band during their 2009 tour of Europe and expressed how much listening to Blood Mountain had helped his creative process while finishing a screenplay, and he offered Mastodon a chance to score the film he had been working on, Jonah Hex. In an interview with Paste magazine, bassist Troy Sanders said that Hayward "called us out of the blue as a fan. It was the most beautiful, authentic way to collaborate." Mastodon used scenes from the film as inspiration during the writing and recording process, and the instrumental soundtrack, Jonah Hex: Revenge Gets Ugly EP, was released on June 29, 2010, through Reprise Records. That same year, the band was confirmed as being part of the soundtrack for Namco Bandai Games' 2010 remake of Splatterhouse. The game's protagonist can also be seen wearing a Mastodon T-shirt in certain flashback cutscenes. On March 15, 2011, Mastodon released their first live DVD/CD, titled Live at the Aragon, through Reprise. The recording features the entire performance of their fourth studio album, Crack the Skye, along with songs from their previous records.

=== The Hunter (2011–2012) ===
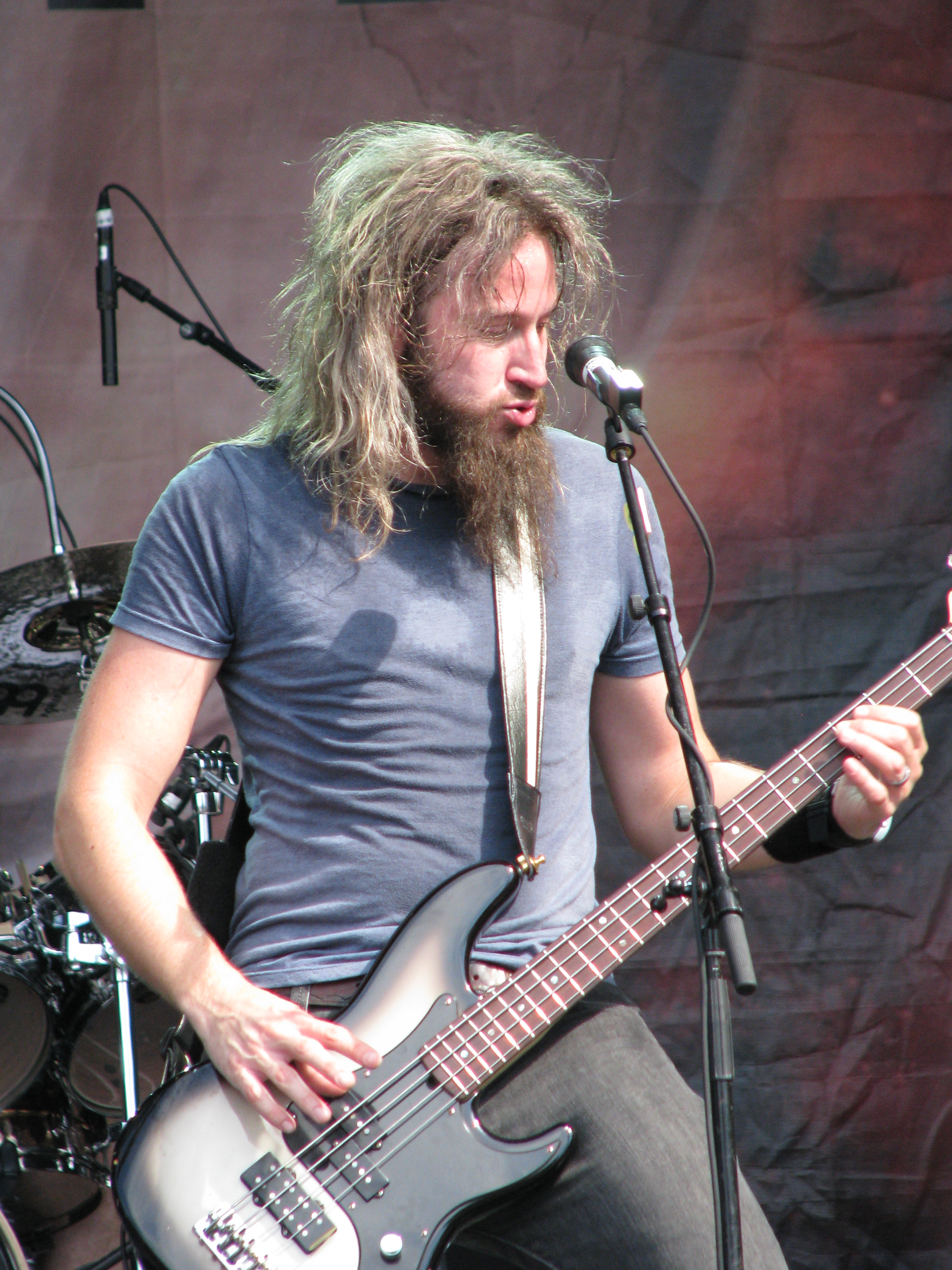
Troy Sanders with Mastodon at Sonisphere, Stockholm, in 2011

The Hunter, Mastodon's fifth studio album, was recorded at Doppler Studios in Atlanta with producer Mike Elizondo. The first hints of the new album were given by the band via Facebook in January 2011. Drummer Brann Dailor revealed during interviews the title of the band's new album and described the new material as not so much proggy or riff-oriented and "a little more stripped down". Meanwhile, the band performed at many major summer festivals. On June 28, 2011, Mastodon released a leftover track from the Crack the Skye sessions, called "Deathbound", through Adultswim.com.

The first taste of The Hunter came in July 2011 when Mastodon released the song "Black Tongue" via YouTube, set to a video of AJ Fosik creating the sculpture used for the album cover. By August 12, the band had revealed the track listing from The Hunter and debuted "Curl of the Burl", the first official single from the new album. It was also announced that a deluxe edition would be released, which featured the bonus tracks "The Ruiner" and "Deathbound" in addition to different cover art. On September 6, Mastodon released a third song from The Hunter, "Spectrelight", featuring Scott Kelly of Neurosis. On September 16, the band released a 53-minute custom visualizer with all of the album tracks, 11 days prior to the release of The Hunter. The album was very well received by fans and the media. It also performed strongly on the official charts, rising to number ten on the Billboard 200.

In support of The Hunter, a North American headline tour was announced. On October 5, 2011, they performed "Curl of the Burl" on the Late Show with David Letterman. On October 12, a UK tour was announced that will run through February 2012 with fellow bands The Dillinger Escape Plan and Red Fang as support acts. They were at Later... with Jools Holland, where they performed "Black Tongue" and "Curl of the Burl". A seventeen-date European tour was announced that featured dates in Scandinavia, Germany, France, Spain, Belgium, Portugal, Italy, the Netherlands and Latvia. On December 1, "Curl of the Burl" was nominated for a Grammy Award in the category Best Metal/Hard Rock performance. It is the band's second nomination with the first being for "Colony of Birchmen" in 2007. The Hunter was named "Album of the Year" by Metal Hammer, Classic Rock and Rock Sound.

In January 2012, it was announced that Mastodon and Swedish prog metal band Opeth will tour together in a joint tour across North America. It was named the "Heritage Hunter Tour" after both bands latest releases, The Hunter and Heritage. The bands took turns in the headlining spot. Support came from the Swedish heavy metal band Ghost. On February 11, 2012, the band performed a sold-out show at the Brixton Academy in London, it was the band's biggest headline show ever. Dry Bone Valley" was released on February 13 as the third single of the album. A music video for the song was also released.

On April 21, 2012, to commemorate Record Store Day, Mastodon released two separate records. The first was a split 7-inch with Feist titled Feistodon. Mastodon covered Feist's "A Commotion" and Feist covered Mastodon's "Black Tongue". The pair also released a one of a kind interactive, crossfading music video for the song 'A Commotion'. The second release was a cover of The Flaming Lips' "A Spoonful Weighs a Ton".

=== Once More 'Round the Sun (2013–2014) ===
Mastodon began recording again in early 2013. Guitarist Brent Hinds described the new music as "really eerie" and "very spooky-sounding", and stated that he has written three new songs. On December 3, 2012, the band announced via their Twitter page that they were writing a song for the film Monsters University. However, the song used in the film was the previously released "Island". They were also part of the 2013 Rockstar Energy Mayhem Festival. On May 6, 2013, the band stated that they are "...Very busy writing and putting songs together for the next studio Mastodon album..." In an interview on July 26, Brann Dailor was reported as saying that the band would "probably [go into the studio] end of September". Mastodon released its second live album, Live at Brixton, in December 2013. The band also played at the 2014 Bonnaroo Music and Arts Festival.

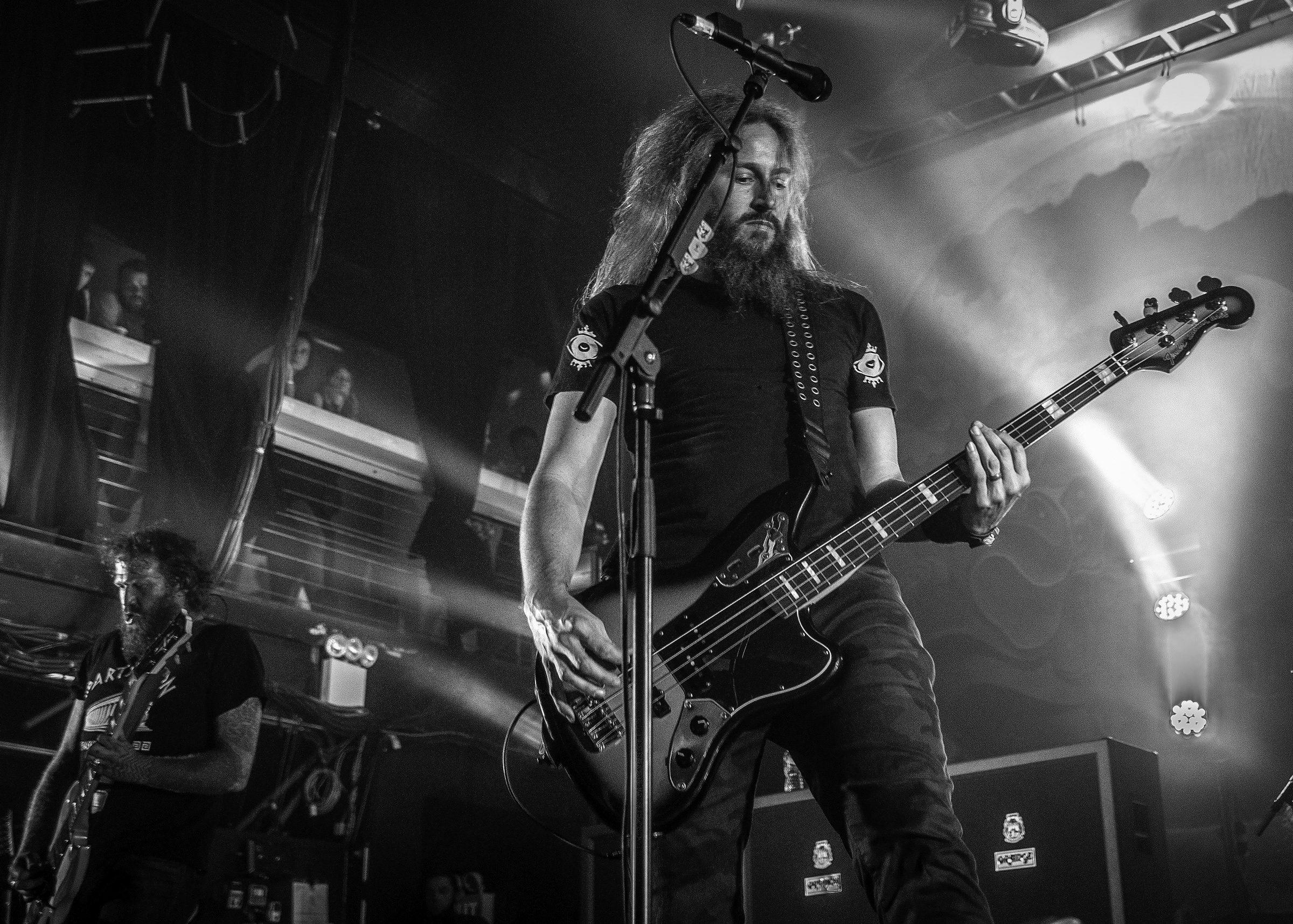
Brent Hinds (left) and Troy Sanders (right) in May 2014

On February 27, Brann Dailor told in the interview that their sixth album would be released in summer of 2014, and he also stated that the band would release an EP in winter of 2014. Some of the confirmed tracks were: "Tread Lightly", "Buzzard's Guts", "Scent of Bitter Almonds", "High Road" and "Aunt Lisa".

In an interview with Troy Sanders in Paste magazine released on April 3, he revealed the album was called Once More 'Round the Sun and had 15 tracks. He also confirmed that Mastodon recorded 90 minutes of material, but only 60 minutes of it will be present on the album; the unreleased material possibly might be released on an EP later in 2014. A few more tracks that have been confirmed are: "Diamonds in the Witch House" (which has Scott Kelly from Neurosis on a guest vocal appearance), and "Ember City".

In an interview on April 11, Dailor revealed the album will be released in June. On April 17, the first single "High Road" was made available for streaming. On April 26, Bill Kelliher revealed the title of the second single "Chimes at Midnight". As of June 16, 2014, the entire album was available for streaming on iTunes.

The album was released on June 24, 2014, through Reprise Records. The album sold around 34,000 copies in the United States in its first week of release to land at position No. 6 on The Billboard 200 chart making it the band's first consecutive top 10 debut, with their previous album, The Hunter, peaking at No.10 after opening with 39,000 copies in 2011.

=== Emperor of Sand and Cold Dark Place (2015–2019) ===
On January 18, 2015, it was reported that Brent Hinds was working on a new Mastodon album, showing a picture with him playing the 13-string pedal steel. The same report was later confirmed by Troy Sanders, who stated: "Every record that we do is gonna sound different, because we always want to evolve and create our own musical path. And every record will be different. We do not wanna write the same record twice."

On March 12, 2015, Mastodon released the song "White Walker" for the Game of Thrones: Catch the Throne Vol. 2 mixtape, in promotion for the fifth season of the HBO TV series Game of Thrones. Dailor, Hinds, and Kelliher also appeared in episode 8 of the season as wildlings. Hinds and Kelliher once again returned to Game of Thrones as wights among the White Walker army for the season 7 finale episode, "The Dragon and the Wolf".

The band's seventh studio album, Emperor of Sand, was released on March 31, 2017. The theme for the album was cancer, inspired by Troy's wife who was diagnosed with cancer, and Bill's mother who lost her life to cancer. It details the story of a traveler banished to the desert by an emperor, in effect giving him a death sentence. The story is a metaphor for someone diagnosed with terminal cancer. The first single, "Show Yourself", was released in February, and had peaked at number 4 on the US Billboard Mainstream Rock Songs chart in June, making it the band's highest-charting song to date. The second single, "Steambreather", peaked at number 18 on the same chart in October.

Mastodon also released an EP titled Cold Dark Place on September 22 of the same year. It was a four-song EP, featuring three songs recorded during the Once More 'Round the Sun sessions, and one track recorded during the Emperor of Sand sessions. The first single for the EP, "Toe to Toes" was released on September 1, 2017. Brent Hinds stated that the inspiration behind some of the songs recorded for Cold Dark Place, which he wrote, were inspired by a nasty breakup that he had endured. Describing the sound of the record, Hinds stated that "I wrote some pretty dark, beautiful, spooky, funky, ethereal, melancholy music, which also sounds like the Bee Gees a little bit." On December 1, the band released a revised version of the 12-part "The Making of Emperor of Sand" documentary via their official YouTube channel. Mastodon were announced to be on a co-headlining Summer 2018 Tour with Primus spanning across North America lasting from May to July. In September 2018, the band's manager Nick John died, and the band paid tribute to him by releasing a cover of Led Zeppelin's "Stairway to Heaven" in April 2019.

=== Hushed and Grim, the departure and death of Brent Hinds (2020–2025) ===
On July 31, 2020, Mastodon released a new song titled "Fallen Torches" and announced a compilation album of rare material titled Medium Rarities, which was released on September 11, 2020. On June 17, 2021, the band announced a partnership with livestreaming company Dreamstage to present a live acoustic set in their hometown of Atlanta at the Georgia Aquarium on July 15, with $1 from each sale of a ticket/merchandise package going toward supporting the aquarium. Mastodon released their eighth studio album, Hushed and Grim, on October 29, 2021. The double album was produced by David Bottrill, who had worked previously with such artists as Peter Gabriel, Muse, Tool, and Rush. In 2024, Mastodon co-headlined a tour with Lamb of God, and the bands released the collaborative track "Floods of Triton" in September.

On March 7, 2025, Mastodon announced that the band and Brent Hinds had mutually decided to part ways. Kelliher said that Hinds' relationship with the band was "like a marriage", and that "sometimes people grow apart... it's amazing that we made it 25 years with the four of us". Hinds was less amicable, commenting: "I won't miss being in a shit band with horrible humans." Two days later, the band played with Ben Eller filling in on lead guitar. In May, the band brought in guitarist Nick Johnston to tour with them on their run of shows with Coheed and Cambria and Periphery. In August, Hinds claimed that he was kicked out of Mastodon and continued to insult the remaining members.

On August 20, 2025, Hinds was killed in a traffic collision after he was hit by another vehicle while riding his motorcycle. The band made a statement saying: "We are heartbroken, shocked and still trying to process the loss of this creative force with whom we’ve shared so many triumphs, milestones, and the creation of music that has touched the hearts of so many." On August 22, 2025, at the end of their first show following Hinds' death at the Alaska State Fair, the band paid tribute to their former bandmate, with drummer Brann Dailor addressing the audience about his death: "We had the ups and downs of a 25-year relationship. It's not always perfect, it's not always amazing, but we were brothers to the end. And we really loved each other and we made a lot of very beautiful music together. And I think that that’s gonna stand the test of time, evidenced by you people here tonight."

=== Marrow Deep (2026–present) ===
In September 2025, Mastodon began recording their ninth studio album, Marrow Deep. It is the band's first album as a five-piece with guitarist Nick Johnston and keyboardist João Nogueira. In May 2026, drummer Brann Dailor confirmed that the album was finished, and that Hinds did not record any new material before his departure from the band. The album's first single, "Your Ghost Again", was released on June 2 and was described as a tribute to Hinds. On July 8, 2026, Sanders, Kelliher, and Dailor released a 35-minute documentary entitled The Mastodon in the Room, in which they reflected on their relationship with Hinds while watching archival footage together.

The following week, they announced the new album's title and a release date of August 28 via Loma Vista. A second single, "Snakes for Dinner", was released in tandem with the announcement; it features guest vocals from Josh Homme, marking his first collaboration with the band in 20 years. In a press release, Sanders confirmed that both Nick Johnston and João Nogueira had joined the band on a full-time basis, noting: "Bill, Brann, and myself are thrilled that we still have the opportunity to do this, and we’ve got other members who are just over the moon to be in the band with us."

To support the album, Mastodon announced the Poisonous Weapons Tour, with Deafheaven and Alcest opening all dates. Baroness frontman John Dyer Baizley joined the band's touring lineup to perform vocals and guitar.

== Artistry ==
=== Musical style ===
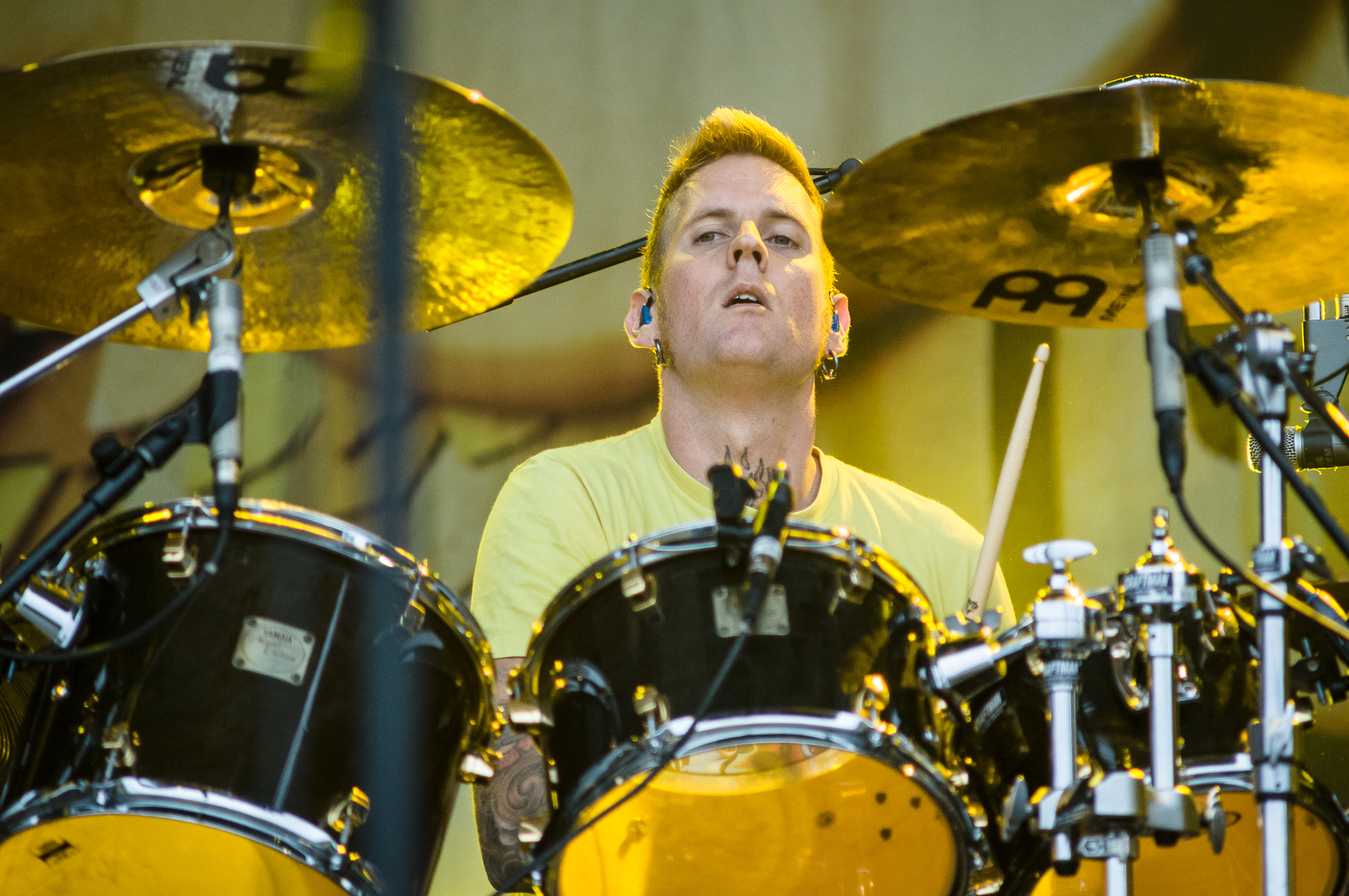
Brann Dailor's (pictured) fill-heavy drumming style is influenced by jazz and progressive rock, characterized by complex, atypical rhythmic structures (including irregular stopping and starting). He also attributes his style to band practice as a teenager, claiming that practicing with the guitarist instead of the bassist influenced his style.

Mastodon has been described as progressive metal, alternative metal, sludge metal, stoner metal, hard rock, experimental metal, groove metal, and metalcore in their earlier albums, though their loyalty to each genre has varied throughout their career. James Christopher Monger of AllMusic called them "one of the more notable new wave of American heavy metal acts, a genre spawned in the mid-'90s" and says that "Mastodon's innovative, lyrically astute blend of progressive metal, grindcore, and hardcore helped position the band as one of the preeminent metal acts of the early 21st century." The band's earlier material such as the EP Lifesblood was described as "In the Eyes of God-era Today Is the Day [...] butting heads with the more technically demanding school of Relapse-style hardcore/metalcore (e.g., [The] Dillinger Escape Plan or Burnt by the Sun, although Mastodon is much less hyper)."

Bassist Troy Sanders stated about their musical style:

We don't consider ourselves a metal band. We recognize there is a lot of metal in us, but we also want to believe we have a lot of rock and roll in us, and we have a lot of progressive rock in us, we have bits and pieces of thrash and punk, and psychedelic-ness sprinkled throughout. A lot of times for me personally, just having the metal tag itself seems kind of limiting on us because we have such an appreciation for all styles of music and we like to incorporate bits and pieces of those into our songs. But we also recognize all the different subgenres and the millions of times people say, "Oh, what do they sound like?" and you say something, I understand that. But, it doesn't affect how we create anything at all.

Mastodon's musical style evolved significantly between their earliest pre-Remission releases through to The Hunter. Their early work was significantly heavier and more abrasive than their later work, primarily or exclusively using harsh vocals, more distorted instruments, and more atypical song structures. The release of Mastodon's third studio album, Blood Mountain, which incorporates both clean and harsh vocals, marked a shift in the vocal styles used, with subsequent albums favoring clean vocals almost exclusively. The band's 2009 album Crack the Skye strongly incorporated progressive metal, which the band would continue to explore on subsequent releases.

=== Lyrical themes ===
Over its first four albums, Mastodon had specific concepts in mind, specifically the classical elements of fire, water, earth, and aether.

Remission does not deal with a particular theme but it is loosely based on the theme of fire. Songs like "Crusher Destroyer", "Where Strides the Behemoth" and "Ol'e Nessie" deal with the theme of fictional creatures.

Leviathan is about the novel Moby-Dick. It centers around the main characters and their thoughts during the story.

Blood Mountain is about a man who is searching for the "Crystal Skull", which is on top of the "Blood Mountain". According to bassist Troy Sanders, "It's about climbing up a mountain and the different things that can happen to you when you're stranded on a mountain, in the woods, and you're lost. You're starving, hallucinating, running into strange creatures. You're being hunted. It's about that whole struggle."

Crack the Skye deals with many different themes. The title, as well as some lyrical content, is a tribute to Skye, the younger sister of drummer Brann Dailor, who committed suicide at the age of fourteen. Themes touched on within the album include "dark magic(k), astral travelling and the role of Rasputin in the downfall of Czarist Russia".

The Hunter does not deal with an entire concept like their earlier work. The title is a tribute to Hinds' brother, Brad Hinds, who died of a heart attack on December 4, 2010, while hunting.

Once More 'Round the Sun, like its predecessor, is not a concept album. It features themes such as relationships, struggles, hardships and addiction. The album was based on the various events that took place in each band member's lives the year before the album release.

Emperor of Sand mainly deals with the themes of death and survival and is about a desert wanderer faced with a death sentence. The lyrics were inspired by the friends and family members of the band who were diagnosed with cancer.

Hushed and Grim has to do with grief, guilt, and the afterlife. Mastodon pays tribute to the memory of longtime friend and manager Nick John with their first ever double-album and a surrounding death mythology. According to drummer and co-vocalist Brann Dailor, in this mythology "When you die, your soul inhabits the heart of a living tree. You have to experience the seasons the way that a tree does through a whole calendar year. That's the way you have to say goodbye to the natural world. And in that time, you reflect on the pillars of the life that you lived. You get to atone for things that you've done."

=== Visual artwork ===
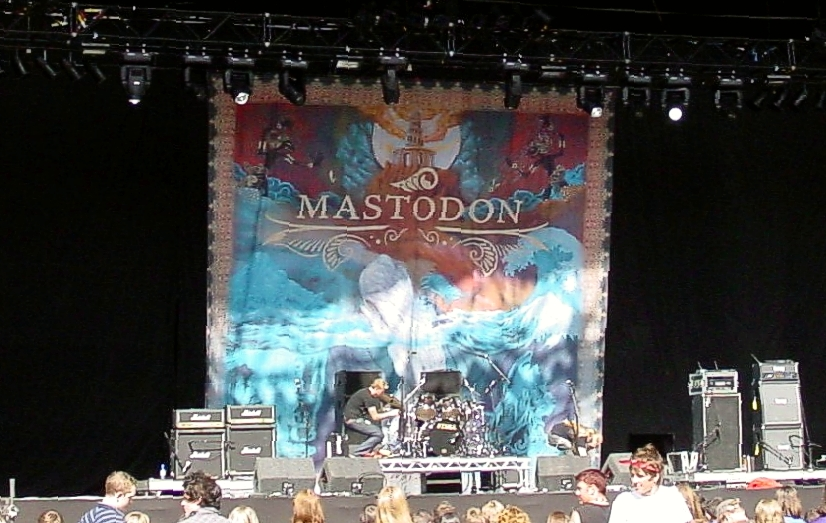
A Mastodon backdrop in 2006, showcasing an elaborate painting, using the Leviathan artwork by Paul Romano

Artist Paul Romano was responsible for all of the band's album art and backdrops up to 2011. The artwork for the band's fifth studio album The Hunter was made by AJ Fosik, a woodcarver who was also responsible for the backdrop the band used live at the time. Oakland-based artist Skinner, who, in his own words, specializes in "psychedelic nightmare paintings", has taken the reins on Once More 'Round the Sun. "It's going to be a work of art for sure. It's going to be very eye-opening", said bassist Troy Sanders before the album's release. "Very striking. It's from another dimension, and a lot of our music is geared toward that idea—taking you to another planet on songs. It's out there, and I think it's incredible."

=== Live performances ===
Following their first tours in the early 2000s, Mastodon have performed at many major festivals such as Download, Roskilde, Coachella, Bonnaroo, Big Day Out, Rock Werchter, Pinkpop, Metaltown, Ottawa Bluesfest, Sonisphere and Soundwave. When performing the band has traditionally had a fairly lo-fi visual presentation. However, during the band's "Crack the Skye Tour" (2009–2010), they used a large screen behind the drumkit with an elaborate visual presentation.

== Legacy and reception ==
The "sludge/stoner/alternative metal outfit" Mastodon, as labeled by AllMusic, is "one of the preeminent metal acts of the early 21st century". The BBC stated about Mastodon: "They might be bonkers of lyric, full of fantasy mumbo jumbo, but the band is unashamedly committed to its complex-of-composition craft, and the results have frequently stunned ever since their 2002 debut, Remission. They are the most ambitious, most fearless, most fun heavy metal band to have breached the mainstream since the genre oozed its way out of the Midlands in the 1970s." Alternative Press has stated: "Mastodon are one of the all-time great hard rock groups." Rolling Stone stated: "Mastodon are a bunch of doom-haunted, myth-obsessed, meat-and-potatoes Southern badasses who have become the most important new band in metal." Playboy wrote: "one of Mastodon's greatest talents: the ability to take traditional metal fans along with them into other musical realms, and also appeal to more mainstream rock fans but give them some doses of metal."

== Band members ==
=== Current members ===
- Brann Dailor – drums, percussion (2000–present), lead vocals (2008–present), backing vocals (2005–2008)
- Bill Kelliher – rhythm guitar, backing vocals (2000–present)
- Troy Sanders – bass, lead vocals (2000–present), synthesizer (2008–2009)
- João Nogueira – keyboards, synthesizer (2025–present; touring and session musician 2021–2025)
- Nick Johnston – lead guitar, backing vocals (2025–present; touring musician 2025)

=== Current touring musicians ===
- John Dyer Baizley – rhythm guitar, lead vocals (2026–present)

=== Former members ===
- Brent Hinds – lead guitar, lead vocals (2000–2025; died 2025)
- Eric Saner – lead vocals (2000)

=== Former touring musicians ===
- Derek Mitchka – keyboards (2009–2011)
- Ben Eller – lead guitar, backing vocals (2025)

== Discography ==
Studio albums

- Remission (2002)
- Leviathan (2004)
- Blood Mountain (2006)
- Crack the Skye (2009)
- The Hunter (2011)
- Once More 'Round the Sun (2014)
- Emperor of Sand (2017)
- Hushed and Grim (2021)
- Marrow Deep (2026)

== Awards and nominations ==
Danish Metal Awards

Year	Nominee / work	Award	Result
2009	Crack the Skye	Best International Metal Album	Won

Grammy Awards

Year	Nominee / work	Award	Result
2007	"Colony of Birchmen"	Best Metal Performance	Nominated
2012	"Curl of the Burl"	Best Hard Rock/Metal Performance	Nominated
2015	"High Road"	Best Metal Performance	Nominated
2018	Emperor of Sand	Best Rock Album	Nominated
2018	"Sultan's Curse"	Best Metal Performance	Won
2022	"Pushing the Tides"	Best Metal Performance	Nominated
2027	"Your Ghost Again"	Best Metal Performance	Pending

Kerrang! Awards

Year	Nominee / work	Award	Result
2009	"Oblivion"	Best Video	Won
2012	The Hunter	Best Album	Won

Metal Hammer Golden Gods Awards

Year	Nominee / work	Award	Result
2007	Blood Mountain	Album of the Year	Nominated
2007	Brent Hinds & Bill Kelliher	Golden Gods Award for Best Shredder	Won
2012	The Hunter	Golden Gods Award for Best Album	Won
2017	Mastodon	Best Live Band	Won

Metal Storm Awards

Year	Nominee / work	Award	Result
2004	Leviathan	Best Alternative Metal Album	Won
2009	Crack the Skye	Best Alternative Metal Album	Won
2009	"Divinations"	Best Video	Nominated
2011	The Hunter	Best Sludge/Stoner Metal Album	Won
2014	Once More 'Round the Sun	Best Sludge/Stoner Metal Album	Won
2017	Emperor of Sand	Best Progressive Metal Album	Nominated
2021	Hushed & Grim	Best Progressive Metal Album	Won

Revolver Golden Gods

Year	Nominee / work	Award	Result
2012	Brann Dailor	Golden Gods Award for Best Drummer	Nominated
