= Leviathan (Mastodon album) =

Studio album by Mastodon
- Released: August 31, 2004
- Recorded: March 2004
- Studios: Robert Lang Studios, Studio Litho, and the Electrokitty Sound Studio, Seattle, Washington
- Genres: Progressive metal; sludge metal; metalcore
- Length: 46:43
- Label: Relapse
- Producers: Mastodon, Matt Bayles

Mastodon chronology
Remission (2002)	Leviathan (2004)	Call of the Mastodon (2006)

Special edition/Vinyl cover

Singles from Leviathan
- 1. "Iron Tusk" Released: August 2004; 2. "Naked Burn" Released: 2004; 3. "Blood and Thunder" Released: 2005

Leviathan is the second album by American heavy metal band Mastodon, released in 2004 on Relapse Records. It is Mastodon's first concept album, with lyrics based on the 1851 novel Moby-Dick by Herman Melville. The songs "Iron Tusk", "Naked Burn", and "Blood and Thunder" were released as promotional singles, and music videos were created for "Iron Tusk", "Blood and Thunder", and "Seabeast". Three magazines awarded the album Album of the Year in 2004: Revolver, Kerrang! and Terrorizer. In 2009 and 2015, MetalSucks named Leviathan the best metal album of the 21st century.

Leviathan was also released with an audio DVD in a limited edition set with a black and gold slipcase. The album brought Mastodon widespread critical acclaim and, together with the ensuing tour, greatly extended their fan base. It sold 106,000 copies by September 2006. Guitarist Bill Kelliher considers this album a representation of the water element, in keeping with the elemental tetralogy of the band's first four albums.

In 2021, Eli Enis of Revolver included the song "Blood and Thunder" in his list of the "15 Greatest Album-Opening Songs in Metal".

== Videography ==
The "Tour Edition" CD was released in 2005 which in addition to the main album contained the videos for "Iron Tusk" and "Blood and Thunder". The Tour Edition is presented in a slipcase which shows the complete cover artwork, rather than the detail of the whale shown on the standard edition. This is also the cover for the vinyl edition. A video for "Seabeast" was completed in 2006.

== Packaging ==
Cover art and booklet artwork was done by Paul Romano. The white tower seen in the artwork on the inside cover of the booklet is a revamped version of Martin Heemskerck's 16th-century interpretation of the Pharos of Alexandria. The wave seen in the full picture of the artwork is a reflection of Hokusai's The Great Wave off Kanagawa.

== Reception ==
Professional ratings
Review scores
Source	Rating
AllMusic	5/5 stars
Blender	4/5 stars
Brave Words & Bloody Knuckles	9/10
Drowned in Sound	9/10
Kerrang!	5/5 stars
Metal Storm	9.0/10
Pitchfork	8.5/10
Rock Hard	8.5/10
Spin	A
Terrorizer	9/10

Placing Mastodon "among the elite of bands" on the strength of Leviathan, Avi Pitchon wrote in Terrorizer that the album "rampages through in a shining epic flow, the 'crazy' parts never separate from the classic metal parts". Online music magazine Pitchfork placed Leviathan at number 126 on their list of top 200 albums of the 2000s. In 2009, MetalSucks compiled a list of the "21 Best Metal Albums of the 21st Century So Far" based on the opinions of various musicians, managers, publicists, label representatives and writers, on which Leviathan was placed at number one. The album was honored with a 2004 Metal Storm Award for Best Alternative Metal Album. In 2017, Rolling Stone ranked Leviathan 46th on their list of "The 100 Greatest Metal Albums of All Time". German magazine Rock Hard ranked Leviathan ninth on the list of the 15 most important progressive metal albums.

== Track listing ==
All lyrics are written by Mastodon, except "Aqua Dementia" by Mastodon and Scott Kelly; all music is composed by Mastodon.

Leviathan track listing
No.	Title	Length
1.	"Blood and Thunder" (featuring Neil Fallon)	3:48
2.	"I Am Ahab"	2:45
3.	"Seabeast"	4:15
4.	"Island"	3:26
5.	"Iron Tusk"	3:03
6.	"Megalodon"	4:22
7.	"Naked Burn"	3:42
8.	"Aqua Dementia" (featuring Scott Kelly)	4:10
9.	"Hearts Alive"	13:39
10.	"Joseph Merrick" (instrumental)	3:33
Total length:		46:43

On the vinyl editions, "I Am Ahab" and "Island" are moved to tracks 7 and 8, respectively.

Mastodon box set bonus tracks
No.	Title	Writer(s)	Length
11.	"The Bit" (Melvins cover)	Buzz Osborne, Dale Crover	4:29
12.	"Emerald" (Thin Lizzy cover)	Scott Gorham, Brian Downey, Brian Robertson, Phil Lynott	3:52
13.	"Orion" (Metallica cover, instrumental)	Cliff Burton, James Hetfield, Lars Ulrich	8:25

Deluxe Edition DVD tracks
No.	Title	Length
1.	"Naked Burn" (5.1 surround)	3:42
2.	"Aqua Dementia" (5.1 surround)	4:10
3.	"Hearts Alive" (5.1 surround)	13:39
4.	"Where Strides the Behemoth" (Live)	3:17
5.	"Battle at Sea" (Live)	4:11
6.	"Thank You for This / We Built This Come Death" (Live)	4:01
7.	"Crusher Destroyer" (Live)	2:06
Total length:		35:06

== Personnel ==
Mastodon

- Troy Sanders – bass, vocals
- Brent Hinds – lead and rhythm guitar, vocals
- Bill Kelliher – rhythm and lead guitar
- Brann Dailor – drums

Guest musicians

- Neil Fallon (Clutch) – additional vocals on "Blood and Thunder"
- Scott Kelly (Neurosis) – additional vocals on "Aqua Dementia"
- Phil Peterson – cello on "Aqua Dementia"
- Matt Bayles – organs on "Joseph Merrick"

Production

- Matt Bayles – producer, recording, mixing
- Matthew F. Jacobson – executive producer
- Alan Douches – mastering
- Paul A. Romano – artwork, design

== Charts ==
Chart (2004–2006)	Peak position
UK Albums (OCC)	110
UK Independent Albums (Official Charts)	15
UK Rock & Metal Albums (Official Charts)	9
US Billboard 200	139
US Heatseekers Albums (Billboard)	5
US Independent Albums (Billboard)	13
Chart (2004–2006)	Peak position
Scottish Albums (Official Charts)	63
