= Troy Sanders =

American bassist and singer (born 1973)

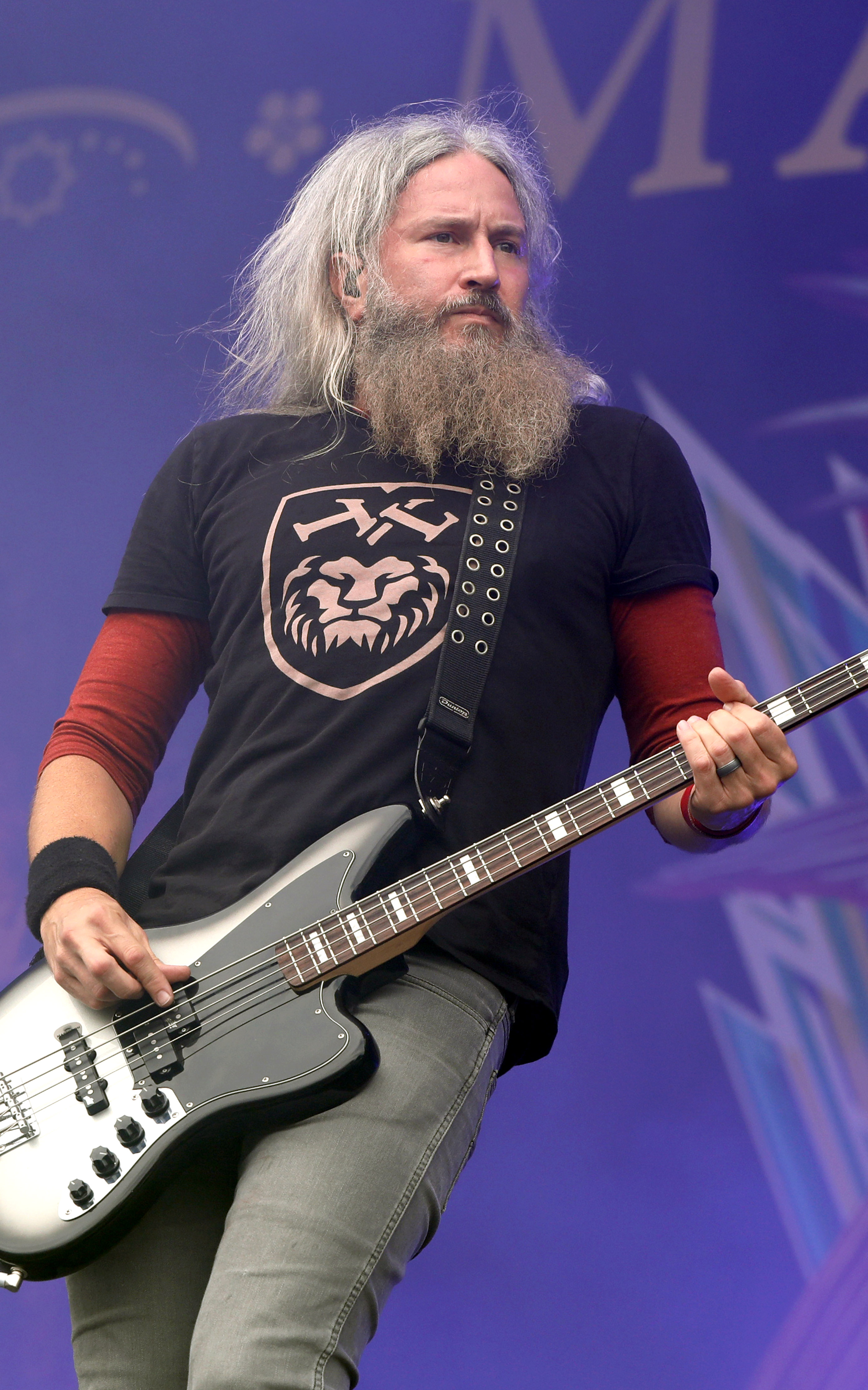
- Sanders performing at Rock im Park 2022

Background information
- Born: Troy Jayson Sanders; September 8, 1973 (age 53); Atlanta, Georgia, U.S.
- Genres: Progressive metal; sludge metal; stoner metal; alternative metal
- Occupations: Musician, songwriter
- Instruments: Bass guitar, vocals
- Years active: 1990–present
- Member of: Mastodon,
- Formerly of: Killer Be Killed, Gone Is Gone, Social Infestation, Thin Lizzy
- Website: mastodonrocks.com

Troy Jayson Sanders (born September 8, 1973) is an American musician, best known as the bassist and one of the vocalists of heavy metal band Mastodon. He has also been also active in the supergroups Killer Be Killed and Gone Is Gone, and was a touring bassist for the Irish rock band Thin Lizzy in 2019.

== Biography ==
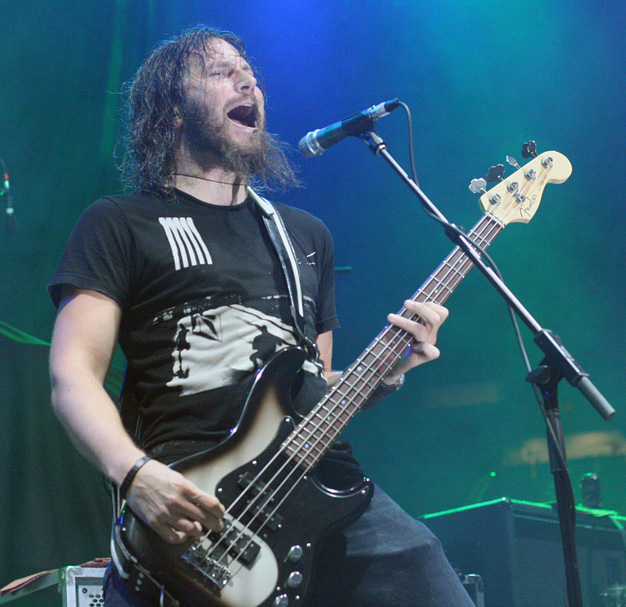
Sanders performing in 2006

Sanders first played bass when he picked up his older brother Kyle's instrument and decided to try it out, even though the bass was strung for a lefty, and he was right-handed. A few months later, he talked his dad into buying him a bass. His first bands were Four Hour Fogger, Knuckle, and Puaka Balava. In 1995, Sanders joined the grindcore band Social Infestation as the bass player; the band has since released one EP and two full-length albums. However, the band hasn't released any material since 2000; it is unknown if the band are either taking a long hiatus or has split.

In 2000, Sanders met Brann Dailor, Bill Kelliher, and Brent Hinds at a High on Fire show. Adding singer Eric Saner, they formed Mastodon. In the early days, they toured the Southern United States while working 40-hour weeks and committing to the band in their spare time. After Saner left the band, Sanders assumed the vocal spot, along with Hinds and Dailor, retaining his duties as the bass player.

In 2012, Sanders joined the supergroup Killer Be Killed, founded by The Dillinger Escape Plan vocalist Greg Puciato and Soulfly/ex-Sepultura frontman Max Cavalera. The band had begun working on new material before announcing their name in October 2013. They released their self-titled debut record through Nuclear Blast Records on May 13, 2014.

In 2016, Sanders formed Gone Is Gone—also a supergroup—consisting of Troy Van Leeuwen, guitar player for Queens of the Stone Age, Tony Hajjar, the drummer for At the Drive-In, and Mike Zarin, a multi-instrumentalist who appeared with Van Leeuwen on Sweethead's Descent to the Surface. They released an EP in the summer of 2016, soon followed by a studio album, Echolocation, the following year. Since then, the band has continued to record together, releasing singles in 2018 and 2019.

== Influences and style ==
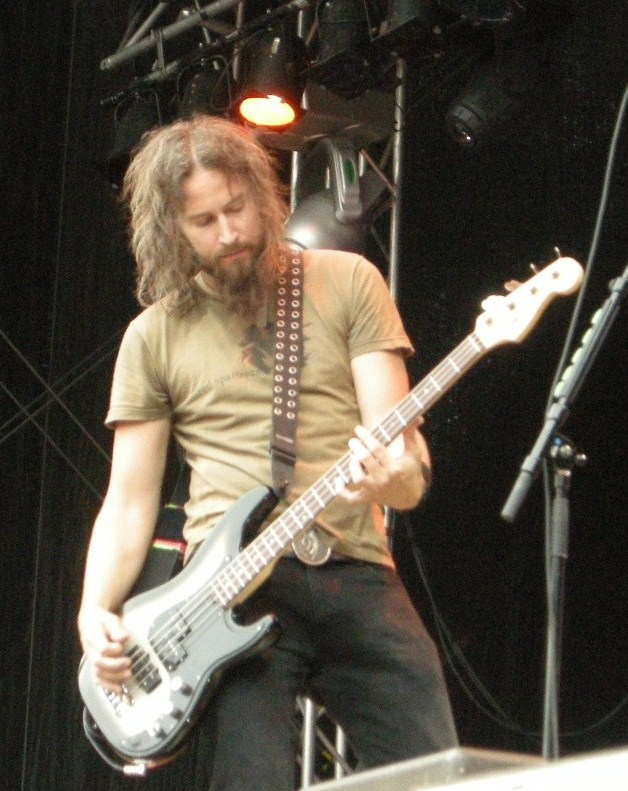
Sanders in 2009

=== Musical style ===
Sanders plays primarily fingerstyle, although he will sometimes use a pick. Musically, he doesn't typically follow the guitar parts in Mastodon, and composes his bass lines on his own. He is known as a versatile player, having used a wide variety of playing styles and techniques.

=== Singing style ===
Sanders performs clean and harsh vocals in Mastodon, where he shares lead vocal duties with Brann Dailor and previously, the late guitarist Brent Hinds. His harsher vocal style is similar to Scott Kelly of Neurosis and Buzz Osborne of the Melvins, utilizing low growls but not low enough to be death grunts. His harsh vocals were largely present in Mastodon's earlier Lifesblood and Remission. On Mastodon's more recent albums, specifically Leviathan through Emperor of Sand, Sanders has utilized a mix of clean vocals along with his harsher style.

=== Influences ===
Sanders has cited Cliff Burton from Metallica, Geddy Lee from Rush, Gene Simmons from Kiss, and Phil Lynott from Thin Lizzy as some of the major influences on his bass playing. He has also stated in interviews that his favorite albums are Rush's Moving Pictures, Men at Work's Business as Usual, Neurosis' Times of Grace, and George Jones' Anniversary – 10 Years of Hits. Adding to that list, in a 2005 interview, he also mentioned Through Silver in Blood by Neurosis, Sailing the Seas of Cheese by Primus, Melvins' Stoner Witch, Metallica's Ride the Lightning, and White Pony by Deftones as some of his favorites.

== Personal life ==
Sanders is married and has two children, a son and a daughter. Sanders’ two brothers, Kyle and Darren, are both involved in music as well. Kyle was the bassist of Bloodsimple, and is in MonstrO, metal supergroup Hellyeah, and Kerry King's solo band; while Darren is "a one man road crew" and bass tech for Mastodon.

== Discography ==
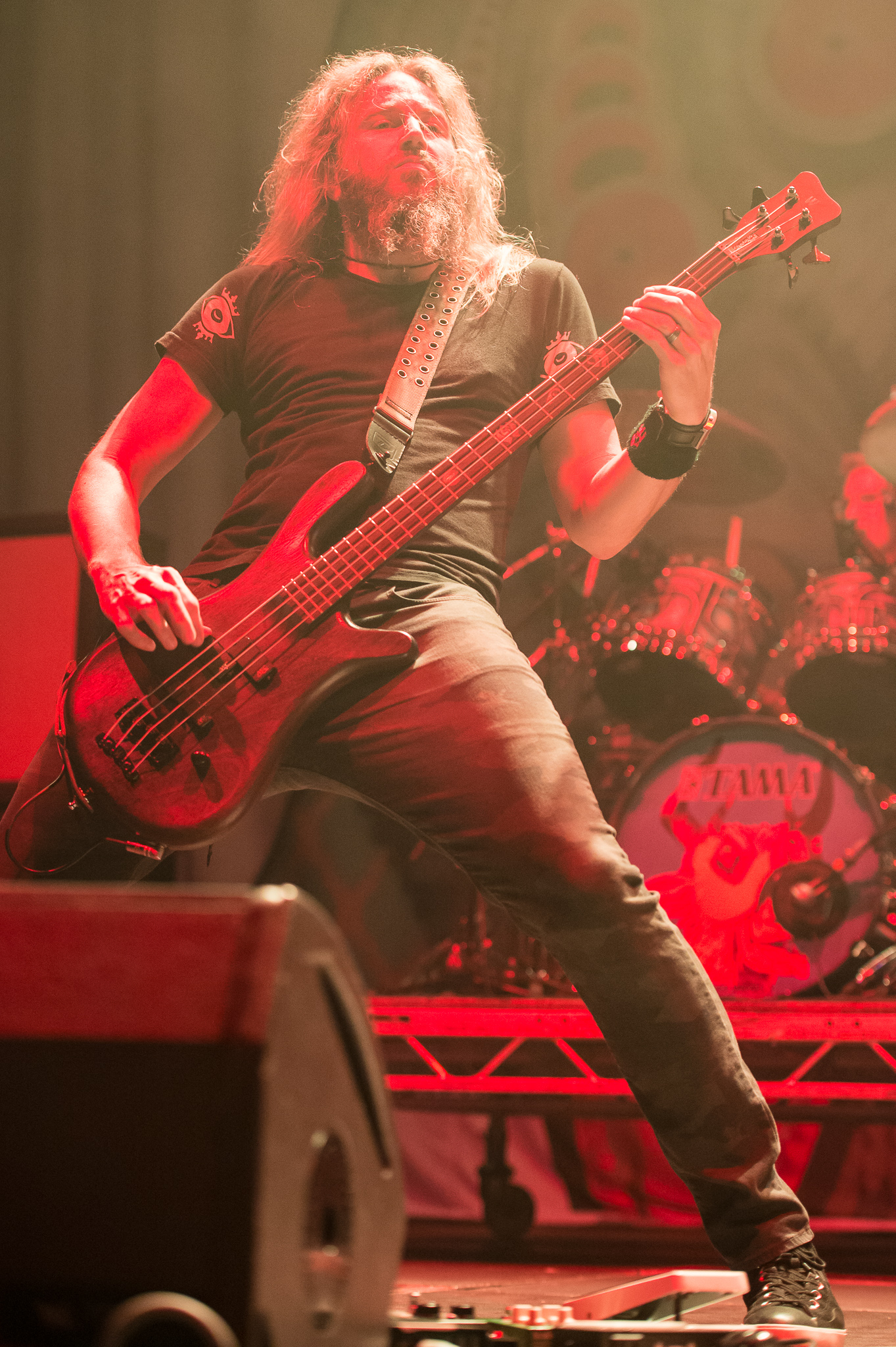
Sanders performing in 2014

=== Social Infestation ===
- Social Infestation (1996)
- Redemption Is Only Skin Deep...It's Time to Cut Deeper (1998)
- Lasciate Ogni Speranza (2000)

=== Mastodon ===
- Remission (2002) – bass, vocals
- Leviathan (2004) – bass, vocals
- Blood Mountain (2006) – bass, vocals
- Crack the Skye (2009) – bass, bass synth, vocals
- The Hunter (2011) – bass, vocals
- Once More 'Round the Sun (2014) – bass, vocals, bass pedals, keyboards
- Emperor of Sand (2017) – bass, vocals, bass pedals
- Hushed and Grim (2021) – bass, vocals
- Marrow Deep (2026) – bass, vocals

=== Killer Be Killed ===
- Killer Be Killed (2014) – bass, vocals
- Reluctant Hero (2020) – bass, vocals

=== Gone Is Gone ===
- Gone Is Gone (2016) – bass, vocals
- Echolocation (2017) – bass, vocals

=== Guest appearances ===
- "Back to the Mountain" by Yakuza on the album Samsara, (vocals)
- "Until Man Exists No More" by Dozer on the album Through the Eyes of Heathens, (vocals)
- In 2013, Sanders starred in a commercial for Orange Amplification's Micro Terror
- "Let Darkness Fall" by Metal Allegiance on the album Metal Allegiance, (vocals)
- "Liars & Thieves" by Metal Allegiance on their second album Volume II – Power Drunk Majesty (vocals)
- "Crack of Doom" by Kvelertak on the album Splid (vocals)
- "Fought the Line" by Dub Trio on the album The Shape of Dub to Come, (vocals)
- "Vultures" by Underoath on the album The Place After This One, (vocals)
- "Harken The Waves" by Urne On the 2026 album Setting Fire To The Sky (Vocals)
