= Brent Hinds =

American guitarist and singer (1974–2025)

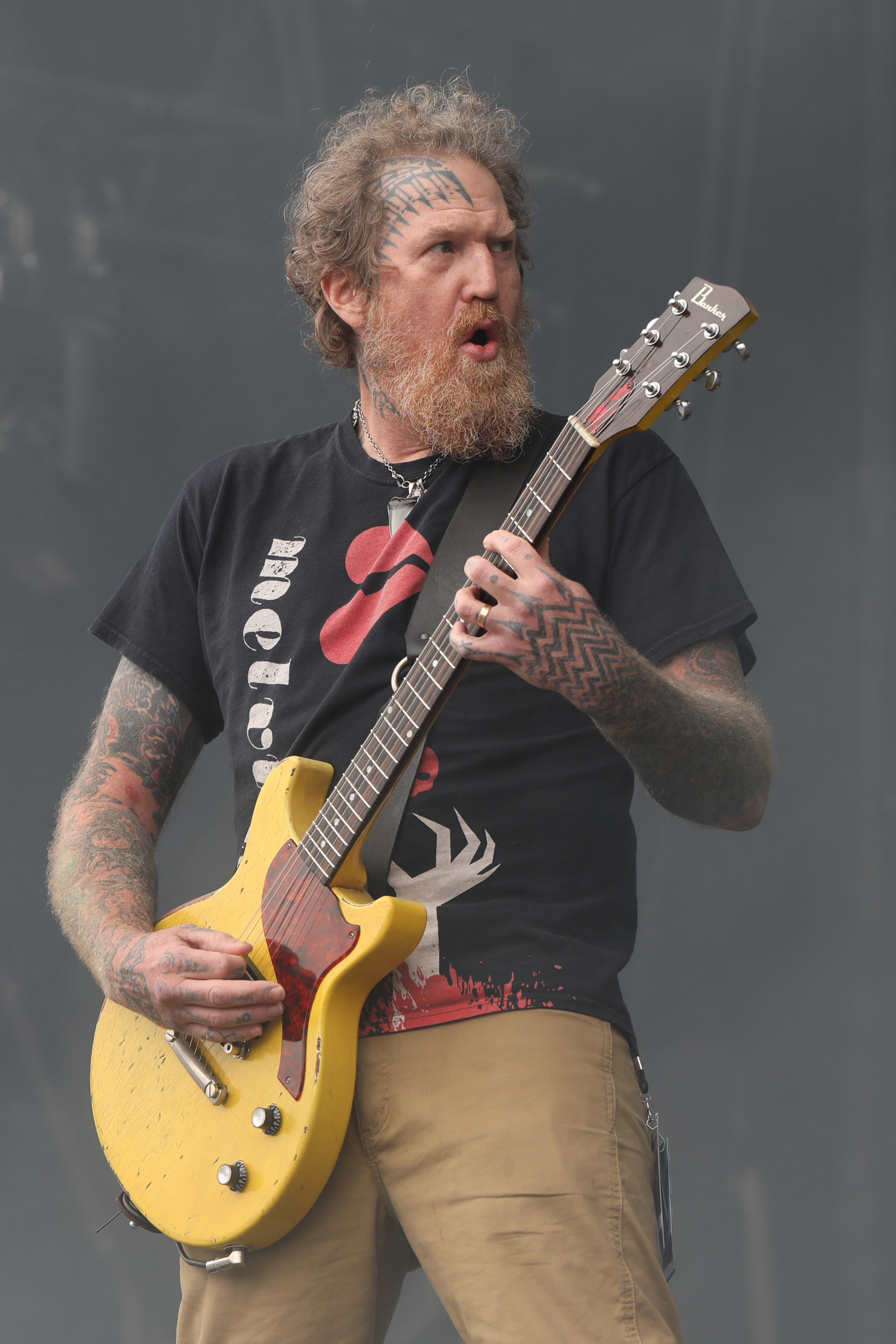
- Hinds performing in 2022

Background information
- Born: William Brent Hinds; January 16, 1974; Helena, Alabama, U.S.
- Origin: Atlanta, Georgia, U.S.
- Died: August 20, 2025 (aged 51) Atlanta, Georgia, U.S.
- Genres: Heavy metal; hard rock; progressive metal
- Occupation: Musician
- Instruments: Guitar; vocals
- Years active: 1991–2025
- Spouse: Raisa Moreno (m. 2017; div. 2023)

William Brent Hinds (January 16, 1974 – August 20, 2025) was an American musician, best known as the former lead guitarist and one of the vocalists of the Atlanta heavy metal band Mastodon. Hinds was also lead guitarist/singer for the surfabilly band Fiend Without a Face, and was at various times involved in other projects including rock bands The Blood Vessels, West End Motel, Four Hour Fogger, The Last of the Blue Eyed Devils, Giraffe Tongue Orchestra, and Legend of the Seagullmen.

== Background ==
Hinds attended the Alabama School of Fine Arts, a statewide public magnet middle and high school in Birmingham, Alabama. Hinds moved to Atlanta in pursuit of a music career where he met Troy Sanders, a future member of Mastodon. According to Sanders, he "lived in his van for the next five years", becoming a member of Sanders' then band, Four Hour Fogger. The first practice he attended with the band he allegedly "showed up so wasted he couldn't even play".

Once Four Hour Fogger fell apart, the two stuck together, eventually meeting Brann Dailor and Bill Kelliher at a High on Fire concert in "their friend's basement". The four began a new musical venture with singer Eric Saner, working 40-hour weeks and playing in the band in their spare time. The band found mainstream success after Saner left the band. As Saner and Sanders shared duties as singers, Hinds took more of a role as a vocalist following his departure.

With Mastodon, Hinds composed the score to Jonah Hex, a 2010 film. In June 2011, Hinds' projects Fiend Without a Face and West End Motel released a split-double CD debut studio album. In 2012, Hinds formed the supergroup Giraffe Tongue Orchestra with fellow guitarist Ben Weinman of The Dillinger Escape Plan fame, former Jane's Addiction bassist Eric Avery, and former The Mars Volta drummer Thomas Pridgen.

Hinds began working with psychedelic rock supergroup Legend of the Seagullmen along with Danny Carey of Tool. Their eponymous debut album was released in February 2018 on Dine Alone Records.

Mastodon announced Hinds' departure by mutual decision in March 2025. However, shortly before his death, Hinds publicly disputed this account, stating that he had been "kicked out" of the band for what he described as "embarrassing them."

== Death ==
On August 20, 2025, Hinds was killed when a BMW SUV hit his motorcycle in Atlanta, Georgia. Hinds was traveling on Boulevard when the driver of the SUV turned left from Memorial Drive and collided with Hinds. Police estimated that Hinds was traveling between 63 and 68 mph at the time of the crash, roughly twice the speed limit. The 911 caller observed Hinds launch into the air and spin multiple times, and responding officers found Hinds conscious and moving with visible injuries to his head, arms and torso. He was taken to Grady Memorial Hospital, where he later died from his injuries. The police concluded Hinds was at fault for the crash due to his excessive speed, despite an eyewitness telling police the light was red.

=== Tributes ===
Following Hinds' passing, several musicians such as Zakk Wylde, Alex Skolnick, Scott Ian, Shirley Manson, Matt Heafy, and many others shared various tributes on social media. Hinds' former bandmates in Mastodon also issued a statement: “We are heartbroken, shocked, and still trying to process the loss of this creative force with whom we’ve shared so many triumphs, milestones, and the creation of music that has touched the hearts of so many. Our hearts are with Brent’s family, friends, and fans. At this time, we please ask that you respect everyone’s privacy during this difficult time.”

On August 22, 2025, at end of their first show following Hinds' death at the Alaska State Fair, Mastodon drummer Brann Dailor addressed his passing to the crowd: “We lost somebody very special to us yesterday. Brent Hinds, 25 years with us as our guitar player, one of the most creative, beautiful people that we’ve ever come across in this world, tragically left us. Very, very unfortunate. We loved him so, so, so very much. And we had the ups and downs of a 25-year relationship, you know what I mean? It’s not always perfect, it’s not always amazing, but we were brothers to the end. And we really loved each other and we made a lot, a lot of very beautiful music together. And I think that that’s gonna stand the test of time, evidenced by you people here tonight.” Bill Kelliher posted a tribute, praising Hinds and reflecting on the times they spent together.

== Equipment ==
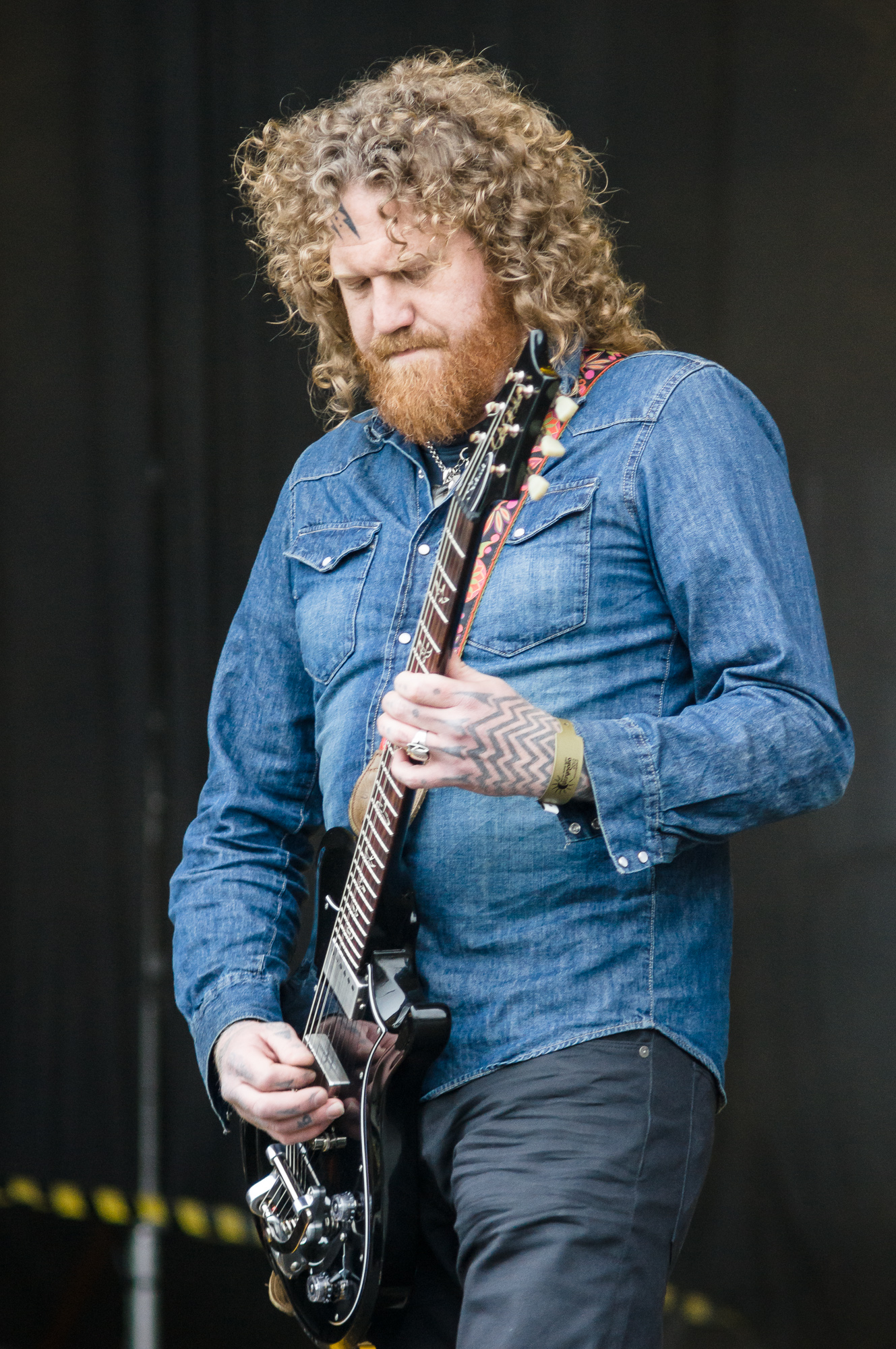
Hinds at Ursynalia 2012 Festival in Warsaw, Poland, June 2012

=== Guitars ===
Hinds favored Gibson Flying V's, typically in silverburst finishes, but owned a wide variety of guitars including a Goldtop Les Paul, a Les Paul Florentine, a Lucite Flying V built by the Electrical Guitar Company, a Gibson SG, a Gibson SG Custom, Gibson Explorers, an Ampeg Dan Armstrong Plexi Guitar (used in the video for "Oblivion"), and a Michael Kelly Phoenix Hollowbody. He also had two custom First Act guitars: a 6-string used in the video for "Colony of Birchmen" (which has asymmetrical horns such as those seen on a Mosrite guitar, a Bigsby vibrato, silverburst finish, and a Mastodon logo inlaid on the headstock) and a 12-string DC Lola, also with a silverburst finish, used on the Unholy Alliance 3 tour to capture a fuller sound while guitarist Bill Kelliher was too ill to perform. He used a 1964 Fender Stratocaster and a 1952 Fender Telecaster while recording "Crack the Skye".

During live performances, Hinds favored his various Silverburst Flying V's. He often performed the solos and more melodic parts, whereas Bill Kelliher most often took rhythm duties. As of 2014, Hinds had also added a PRS Starla to his collection, as seen in the Motherload video as well as live performances of the song. As revealed in the "Tune-Ups" section of the October 2007 issue of Guitar World, the two guitarists primarily used three tunings: D Standard (E standard down one whole step, D G C F A D), Drop C tuning (D Standard tuning with the low D string tuned down an additional whole step, C G C F A D), and a third tuning similar to Drop C, but with the lowest string tuned down to A (A G C F A D).

In April 2016 Epiphone Guitars announced a signature guitar for him based on his Silverburst Flying V Custom and featuring his signature Lace Hammer Claw pickups.

=== Straps ===
Hinds used vintage-style guitar straps with psychedelic prints including custom models from Overdrive Straps.

=== Amplifiers ===
Hinds was featured in Marshall magazine as a JCM 800 2203 player, although since 2010 had favored Orange's Thunderverb Series Amplifiers. In 2014, he was back to using Marshall JMP series amplifiers and a Diezel VH-4. In 2018 Orange released a Brent Hinds signature Terror head. In 2021, Hinds began endorsing the Victory Amplifiers Super Sheriff amps with custom Victory 412 speaker cabinets.

=== Effects ===
Hinds used a Boss Compressor CS-3, Boss Tuner TU-2, Ibanez Tube Screamer TS-9, Line 6 DL4 Delay Modeler, and Voodoo Labs Pedal Power. In 2014, he was seen using a Boss Digital Delay (DD-6), an ISP Technologies Decimator, an MXR Phase 90, MXR GT-OD, an Ernie Ball VP Junior, and a Dunlop 105Q bass wah.

=== Guitar rig and signal flow ===
A detailed gear diagram of Brent Hinds' 2014 Mastodon guitar rig is well-documented.

== Influence and style ==
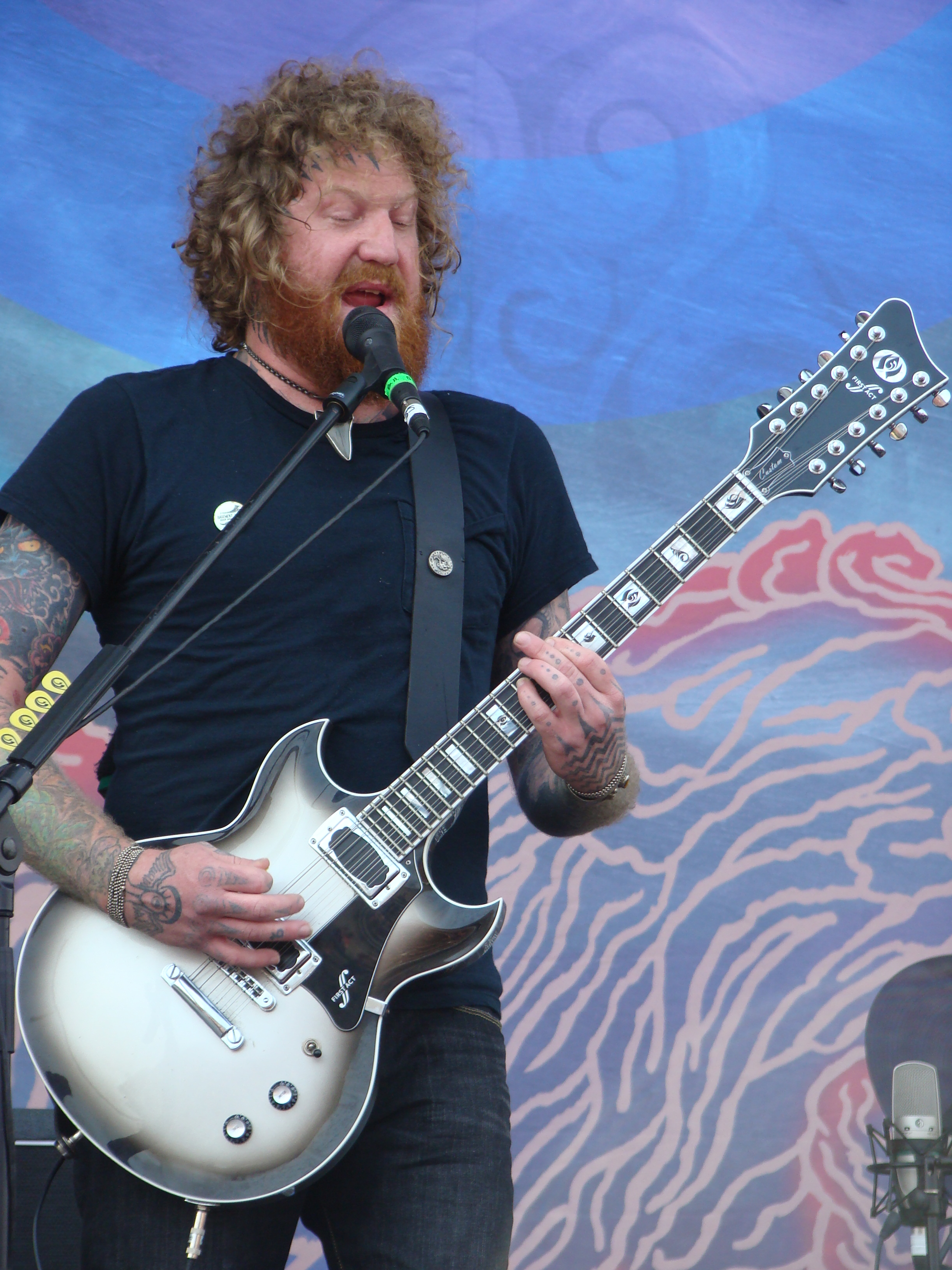
Hinds performing at Gods of Metal in Monza, Italy, June 2009

Originally while playing the banjo, Hinds learned his "signature style" of fast hybrid picking by emulating banjo fingerings on guitar. He frequently utilized the minor pentatonic, natural minor, and the harmonic minor scales in his playing as well as many hammer-ons, pull-offs, and legato slides. Hinds grew up listening to country, but when he entered his late teens he started listening to Neurosis and Melvins, bands which had a profound influence on his musicianship. He said that he was a big fan of the progressive and psychedelic rock genres, especially from the 1970s.

In June 2007, Hinds and bandmate Bill Kelliher won the Metal Hammer Golden Gods award for best shredders. Hinds performed clean and harsh vocals in Mastodon, where he shared lead vocal duties with Troy Sanders and Brann Dailor.

== Discography ==
=== Mastodon ===
- Remission (2002) – lead guitar, vocals
- Leviathan (2004) – lead guitar, vocals
- Blood Mountain (2006) – lead guitar, vocals
- Crack the Skye (2009) – lead guitar, banjo, vocals
- The Hunter (2011) – lead guitar, vocals, lap-steel
- Once More 'Round the Sun (2014) – lead guitar, vocals
- Emperor of Sand (2017) – lead guitar, vocals
- Cold Dark Place (2017) – lead guitars, vocals, lap-steel, claps (track 3)
- Hushed and Grim (2021) – lead guitar, vocals

=== Fiend Without a Face ===
- Fiend Without A Face (1998)
- Brent Hinds Presents: Fiend Without a Face & West End Motel (2011)
- Fiend Without a Face (2017)

=== West End Motel ===
- Brent Hinds Presents: Fiend Without a Face & West End Motel (2011)
- Only Time Can Tell (2012)
- Bad with Names, Good with Faces (2017)

=== Giraffe Tongue Orchestra ===
- Broken Lines (2016)

=== Legend of the Seagullmen ===
- Legend of the Seagullmen (2018)

== Guest appearances ==
- "Days of Self Destruction" by CKY on the album The Phoenix (guitar solos)
- "Make You Mine" by The Black Lips on the album Underneath the Rainbow (guitar)
- "Horse Hunter" by The Dillinger Escape Plan on the album Ire Works (vocals)
- "White Dwarf" by Zoroaster on the album Voice of Saturn (guitar solo and backing vocals)
- "At Arms Length" by Mouth of the Architect on the album The Ties That Blind (vocals)
- Jonah Hex as a Union soldier (film cameo)
- Hinds, along with Brann Dailor, appears on Killswitch Engage's live album (Set This) World Ablaze, in "From the Bedroom to the Basement" – documentary.
- In July 2011, Hinds starred in a commercial for Elmyr, a restaurant in Atlanta.
- In the Game of Thrones episode "Hardhome", Hinds and bandmates Brann Dailor and Bill Kelliher portrayed an extras role, as Wildlings and later in the episode as reanimated Wights.
- "Fear and Fate" by Archival on the album Fear and Fate (backing vocals, guitar overdubs)
- Hinds appears on the song "Land" by Pike vs The Automaton on their album Pike vs The Automaton.
