= Bill Kelliher =

American guitarist

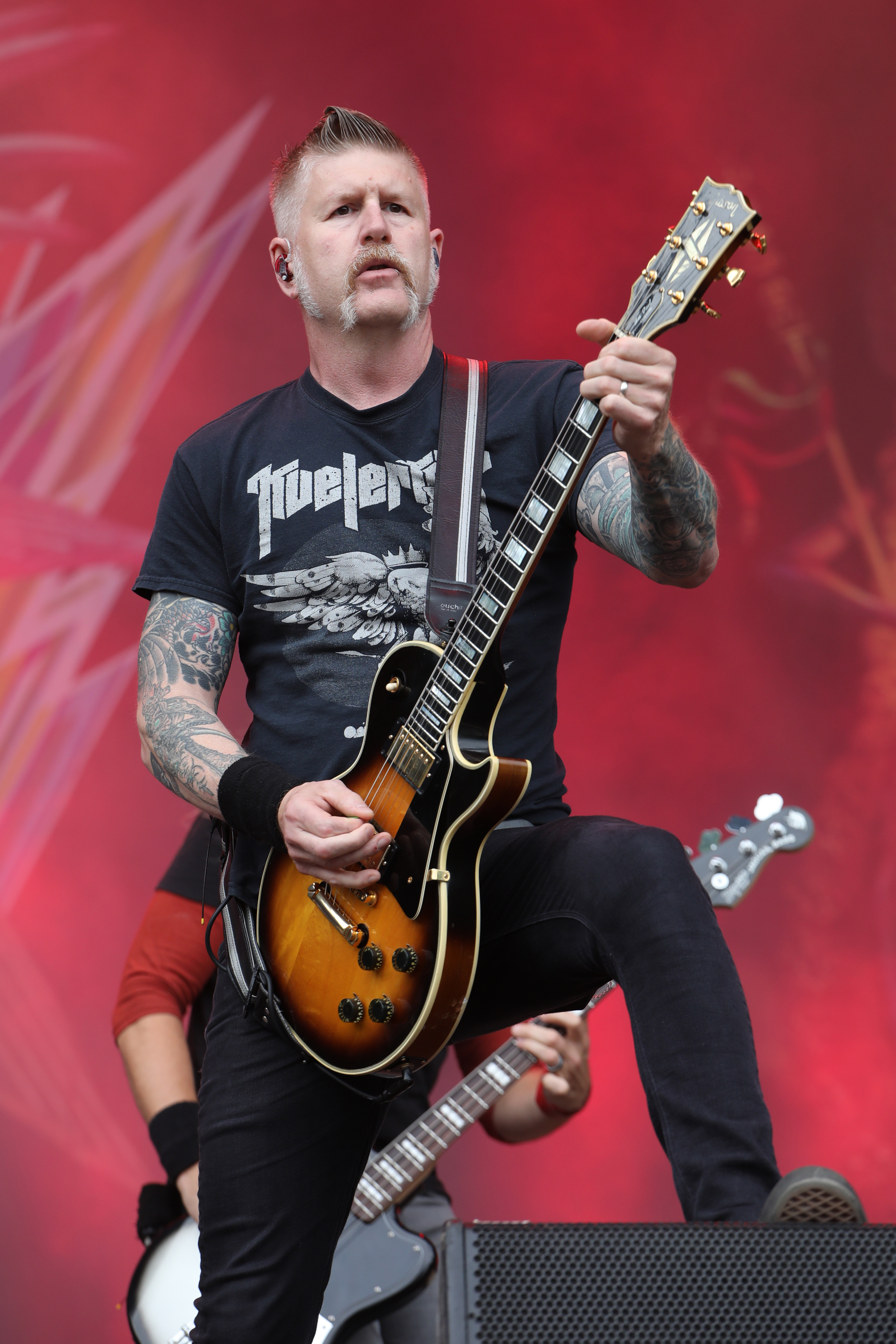
- Kelliher performing in 2022

Background information
- Born: William Breen Kelliher; March 23, 1971 (age 55); Rochester, New York, U.S.
- Genres: Progressive metal; sludge metal; stoner metal
- Occupation: Guitarist
- Years active: 1995–present
- Member of: Mastodon, Burnt by the Sun
- Formerly of: Lethargy, Today Is the Day
- Website: mastodonrocks.com

William Breen Kelliher (born March 23, 1971) is an American musician, best known as the rhythm guitarist of heavy metal band Mastodon and metalcore outfit Burnt by the Sun. Kelliher co-formed Mastodon in 2000 and has appeared on all of their albums.

== Early life ==
Kelliher is an Irish citizen; he holds dual citizenship with the United States and Ireland. His father is an Irish immigrant who, in his teenage years, moved to the U.S. from Killorglin, County Kerry, Ireland.

== Career ==
Kelliher performs a number of different roles within Mastodon, including rhythm guitar, occasional lead guitar, and backing vocals during live performances. He also runs the samples and ambient pieces between and during songs. He shared guitar duties with Brent Hinds, playing mainly rhythm parts, although Kelliher plays solos, including on "Sleeping Giant", and harmonized dual leads with Hinds, as on "Black Tongue".

On June 12, 2007, Hinds and Kelliher won the Metal Hammer Golden Gods award for best shredders, Mastodon's first ever award. Mastodon won a Grammy Award for Best Metal Performance for the song "Sultan's Curse" in 2018.

=== Game of Thrones appearance ===
Kelliher, along with Brann Dailor and Brent Hinds, portrayed "wildlings" on Season 5, Episode 8 of Game of Thrones, which was filmed in Belfast in Northern Ireland. The band's original song "White Walker" is featured on the Game of Thrones mixtape Catch the Throne Vol. 2. A press release from Reprise Records reports that the band was personally invited to participate in the show by Game of Thrones executive producer Dan Weiss, who is a fan of the band.

== Equipment and style ==
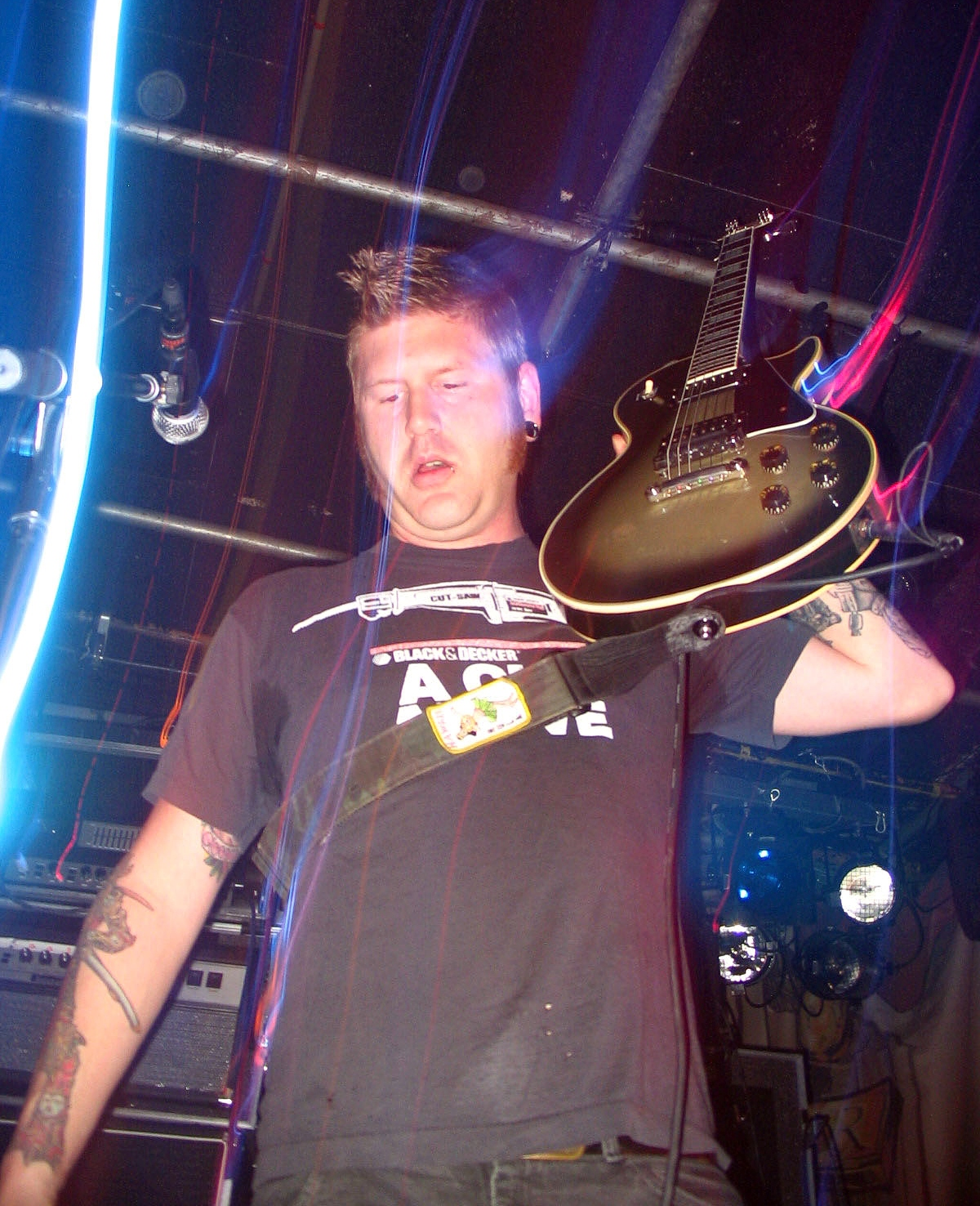
Kelliher in 2007

=== Guitars ===
Kelliher uses several guitars in Mastodon: his main guitar for a long time was a Gibson Les Paul Custom in a Silverburst finish. He used other Les Paul Customs in Ebony and Alpine White during the band's 2009 tour with Dethklok. He has also used several Gibson Explorers, including a vintage Explorer CMT in tobacco burst. Kelliher has also used two custom Yamaha SBGs and a First Act custom 9-string Silverburst DC Lola, which was used particularly on the title track for Crack the Skye. In 2013, Kelliher got a signature Gibson Explorer, named "The Golden Axe". It has a mahogany body and neck, rosewood fretboard with figured acrylic trapezoid inlays, a gold burst finish and Lace Nitro Hemi humbucker pickups. In 2014, Gibson released a signature Bill Kelliher “Halcyon” Les Paul, with Lace Dissonant Aggressor pickups.

In June 2016, ESP Guitars announced that Kelliher had started endorsing their guitars and that they would be releasing two signature models for him, the high-end ESP Bill Kelliher and the more affordable LTD BK-600. The guitars both feature the Eclipse body style with full thickness mahogany bodies with no waist cut, three-piece mahogany set through necks with 22-fret ebony fretboards and 24.75 scale lengths. They feature locking tuners and Tone Pros Tunomatic and stoptail locking bridges, and Kelliher's signature Lace Dissonant Aggressor pickups. They are available in Military Green Sunburst Satin finishes with bound bodies and headstocks and ESP flag inlays.

=== Amplification and effects ===
Kelliher previously used Laney amplification (specifically, the VH100R head), before switching to a Marshall JCM 800 Kerry King signature. Since 2010, Kelliher and his bandmate Brent Hinds performed live with Orange Thunderverb series amplifiers. Kelliher's pedal board includes a Line 6 HELIX and a Digitech Jamman Looper Pedal. Kelliher also uses an Audiotech Guitar Products Source Selector 1X6 Rack Mount Audio Switcher. In 2013 Kelliher collaborated with Lace Pickups on his own signature guitar pickups, the "Dissonant Aggressors". At NAMM 2016, Friedman Amplification launched a signature amp for Kelliher called the Butterslax.

=== Style ===
Like his former bandmate Hinds, Kelliher primarily uses three tunings in Mastodon: D Standard on the Les Paul (E Standard down one whole step, D G C F A D), Drop C on the Yamaha SBG (Drop D down one whole step, C G C F A D), and another tuning similar to D standard, but with the sixth string tuned down to A (A G C F A D), on the Explorer.

== Personal life ==
Kelliher is married and the father of two boys. His wife is an epidemiologist.

== Discography ==
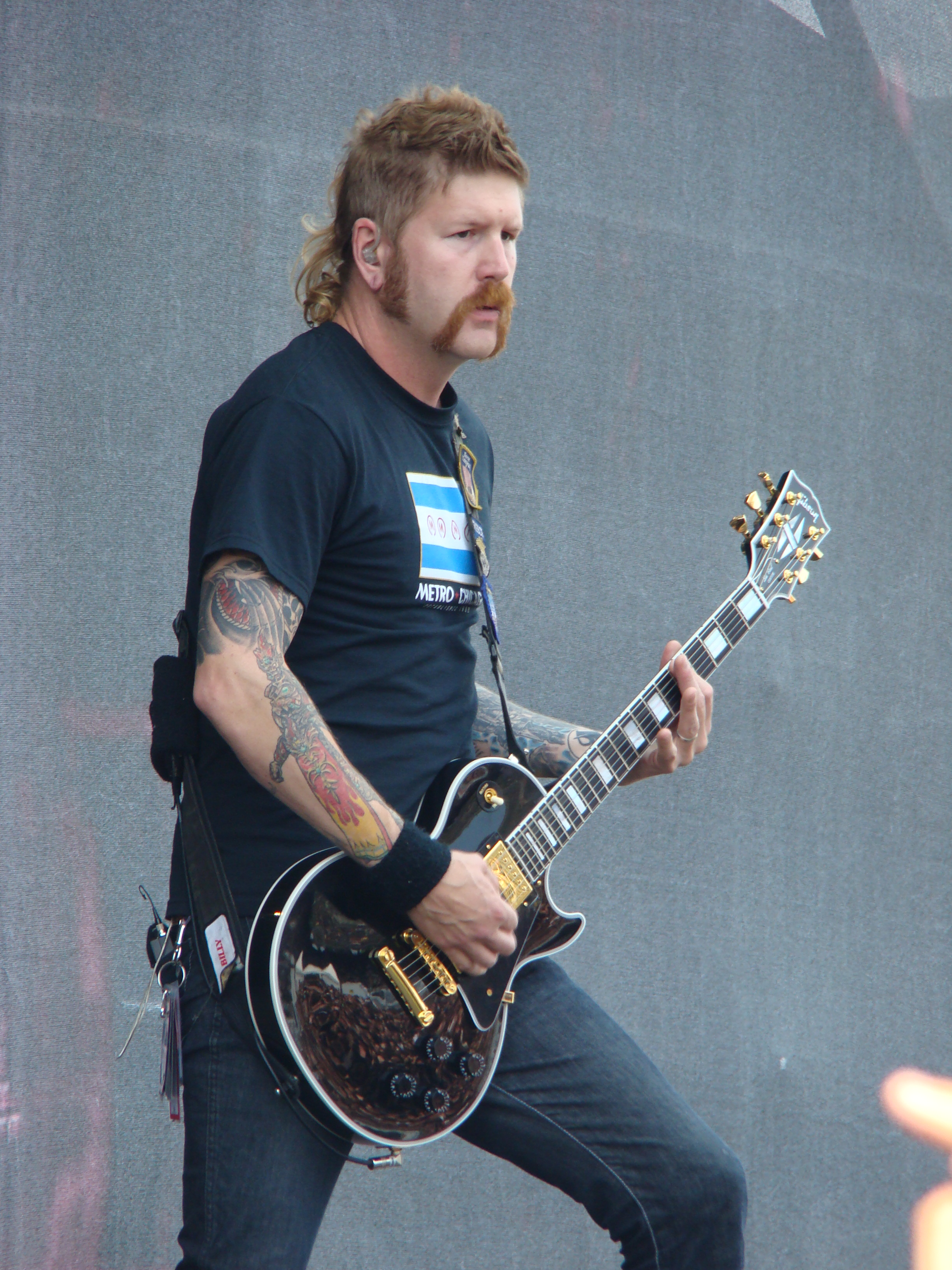
Kelliher performing in 2009

=== Lethargy ===
- It's Hard to Write with a Little Hand (1996) – guitar

=== Today Is the Day ===
- In the Eyes of God (1999) – bass guitar
- Live Till You Die (2000) – bass guitar

=== Mastodon ===
- Remission (2002) – rhythm guitar
- Leviathan (2004) – rhythm guitar
- Blood Mountain (2006) – rhythm guitar, lead guitar on "Sleeping Giant", backing vocals
- Crack the Skye (2009) – rhythm guitar
- The Hunter (2011) – rhythm guitar, lead guitar on "Black Tongue"
- Once More 'Round the Sun (2014) – rhythm guitar
- Emperor of Sand (2017) – rhythm guitar
- Hushed and Grim (2021) – rhythm guitar
- Marrow Deep (2026) – guitars

In a 2017 appearance on Loudwire's YouTube show Wikipedia: Fact or Fiction?, Kelliher expressed incredulity of ever providing any lead vocals on any of Mastodon's studio albums.
