= Scale the Summit discography =

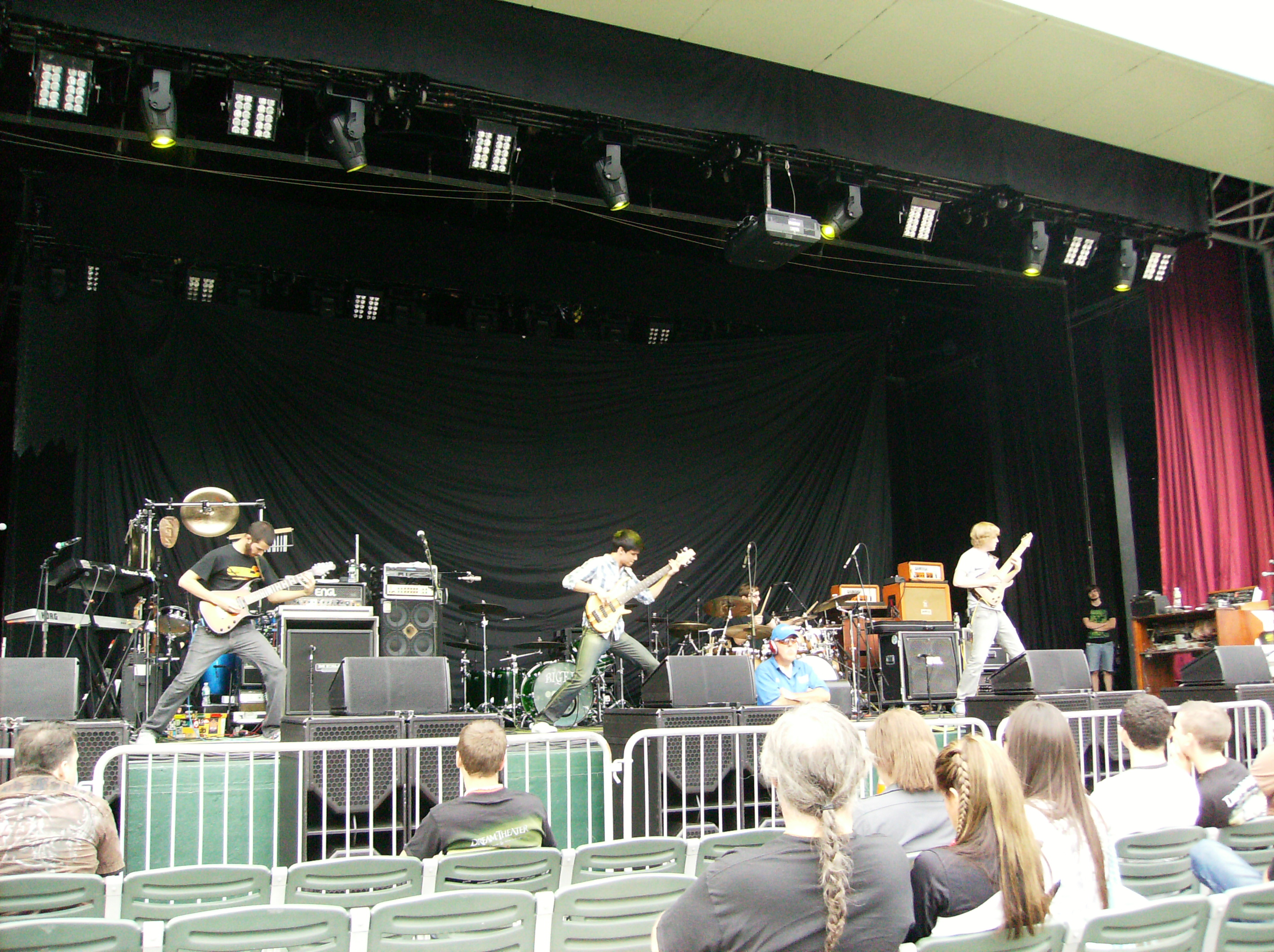
- Studio albums: 7
- Compilation albums: 1
- Singles: 20
- Music videos: 6
- Demo albums: 1

Scale the Summit is an American instrumental progressive metal band from Houston, Texas. Their discography consists of seven studio albums, one compilation album, twenty singles, six music videos and one demo.

Scale the Summit was formed in 2004 by guitarist Chris Letchford and some classmates from the Los Angeles Musicians Institute. Their debut album, Monument, was self-funded and self-released, but the group signed to Prosthetic Records in time to release their second album, Carving Desert Canyons.

After the release of The Collective, the group's third album and last to feature their original line-up, the band finally headlined their own tour in 2012, having been a supporting act on all tours up to that point. The following year, the band released the fourth album The Migration, the first to feature a new member in place of an original member, and two years later another original member left before the release of their fifth album V.

== Albums ==
=== Studio albums ===
List of studio albums, with selected chart positions
Title	Album details	Peak chart positions					
Title	Album details	US	US Hard	US Rock	US Heat	US Indie	US Sales
Monument	Release date: July 10, 2007; Label: Self-released; Formats: CD, music download	—	—	—	—	—	—
Carving Desert Canyons	Release date: February 17, 2009; Label: Prosthetic; Formats: CD, music download	—	—	—	—	—	—
The Collective	Release date: March 1, 2011; Label: Prosthetic; Formats: CD, music download	—	—	—	39	—	—
The Migration	Release date: June 11, 2013; Label: Prosthetic; Formats: CD, music download	131	11	41	3	24	—
V	Release date: September 18, 2015; Label: Prosthetic; Formats: CD, music download	—	14	36	5	29	100
In a World of Fear	Release date: May 19, 2017; Label: Self-released; Formats: CD, music download	98	4	5	1	12	54
Subjects	Release date: June 25, 2021; Label: Self-released; Formats: CD, music download	—	—	—	—	—	—
"—" denotes releases that did not chart

=== Compilation albums ===
List of compilation albums
Title	Album details
Scale the Summit – Digital Collection	Release date: December 22, 2017; Label: Prosthetic; Format: CD, music download

=== Demo albums ===
List of demo albums
Title	Album details
Demo	Release date: 2006; Label: Self-released; Format: CD, music download

== Singles ==
Year	Song	Album
2011	"Whales"	The Collective
2011	"Gallows"	The Collective
2012	"Redwoods"	Non-album single
2013	"Odyssey"	The Migration
2013	"Atlas Novus"	The Migration
2013	"Oracle"	The Migration
2013	"Narrow Salient"	The Migration
2013	"The Olive Tree"	The Migration
2013	"The Traveler"	The Migration
2015	"Stolas"	V
2015	"Kestrel"	V
2015	"Blue Sun"	V
2017	"Royal Orphan"	In a World of Fear
2017	"Astral Kids"	In a World of Fear
2017	"Witch House" (featuring Angel Vivaldi)	In a World of Fear
2017	"Cosmic Crown" (featuring Jeff Loomis and James Iyani)	In a World of Fear
2017	"The Warden" (featuring Nathan Navarro, John Browne and Scott Carstairs)	In a World of Fear
2021	"Jackhammer Ballet" (featuring Joseph Secchiaroli of The Reign of Kindo)	Subjects
2021	"The Land of Nod" (featuring Courtney LaPlante)	Subjects
2021	"Space Cadet" (featuring Eli Cutting)	Subjects

== Music videos ==
Year	Song	Director	Album
2015	"Stolas"	Eddie Zapata	V
2015	"Blue Sun"	Eddie Zapata	V
2017	"The Warden"	Eddie Zapata	In a World of Fear
2017	"Neon Tombs"	Eddie Zapata	In a World of Fear
2017	"Royal Orphan"	Eddie Zapata	In a World of Fear
2017	"Witch House"	Eddie Zapata	In a World of Fear
