= In a World of Fear =

Studio album by Scale the Summit
- Released: May 19, 2017
- Genre: Progressive metal; djent; instrumental rock
- Length: 42:17
- Label: Self-released
- Producer: Chris Letchford

Scale the Summit chronology
V (2015)	In a World of Fear (2017)	Subjects (2021)

Singles from In a World of Fear
- 1. "Royal Orphan" Released: March 16, 2017; 2. "Astral Kids" Released: April 4, 2017; 3. "Witch House" Released: April 18, 2017; 4. "Cosmic Crown" Released: May 5, 2017; 5. "The Warden" Released: May 17, 2017

In a World of Fear is the sixth studio album by American instrumental progressive metal band Scale the Summit. The album was self-released on May 19, 2017, and was produced by the band's guitarist Chris Letchford. It is their first album to be released independently since Monument. It is the band's first album with drummer Charlie Engen and bassist Kilian Duarte. It is also the band's first album to feature guest musicians.

== Background and recording ==
On October 17, 2016, Scale the Summit announced that they are writing new material for the forthcoming album. On December 20, after a rocky few months of accusations and line-up changes, the band headed back to the studio. The recording sessions begun on January 7. February 1, 2017, the group have announced that they have completed tracking their new album and are mixing it.

== Critical reception ==
Professional ratings
Review scores
Source	Rating
Sputnikmusic	1.5/5 stars
Ultimate Guitar	9/10

At Ultimate Guitar, the staff rated the album 9 out of 10 and stated: "Overall, Scale the Summit has done quite well to weather the changes of the past year, and while certainly there will be opinions one way or another on the line-up changes, the main thing we can take from In a World of Fear is that as far as the band's music goes, they're still more than capable of putting out some of the best quality instrumental progressive metal out there. For me, the key to this band's success has always been that they've stuck to playing to their strengths, and experimented only where they needed to. Perhaps an odd thing for a prog-metal band to do, but comparing this record to their first two, Monument and Carving Desert Canyons, there does seem to be a lot of fat trimmed from the music, yet seemingly something added. The variety of sounds on this record is something the band hasn't played with on this level yet, and this is definitely a good thing. It really does seem as every subsequent Scale the Summit record is always "their best", and this one is no exception. So far, this is their best record. The fact that this is their first self-released record, independent of a record label, only heightens this, and I'm certain we can expect more exciting things from the band in the future."

== Track listing ==
No.	Title	Length
1.	"Mass" (featuring Yvette Young)	6:18
2.	"Astral Kids"	4:47
3.	"Royal Orphan"	3:36
4.	"Cosmic Crown" (featuring Jeff Loomis and James Ivanyi)	5:55
5.	"Witch House" (featuring Angel Vivaldi)	4:45
6.	"Neon Tombs"	2:54
7.	"Opal Bones"	3:00
8.	"Dream12"	3:57
9.	"Goddess Gate" (featuring Nick Johnston and Per Nilsson)	3:17
10.	"The Warden" (featuring John Browne, Scott Carstairs and Nathan Navarro)	3:43
Total length:		42:17

== Personnel ==
Credits adapted from AllMusic.

Scale the Summit

- Chris Letchford – guitars, arranging, composition, engineering, guitar engineering, layout, production
- Kilian Duarte – bass (except for track 10)
- Charlie Engen – drums

Additional musicians

- Yvette Young – guest acoustic guitar on track 1
- Jeff Loomis – guest guitar solo on track 4
- James Ivanyi – guest guitar solo on track 4
- Angel Vivaldi – guest guitar solo on track 5
- Nick Johnston – guest guitar solo on track 9
- Per Nilsson – guest guitar solo on track 9
- John Browne – guest guitar solo on track 10
- Scott Carstairs – guest guitar solo on track 10
- Nathan Navarro – guest bass on track 10

Additional personnel

- Mark Dailey and Lindsay Gardner – engineering, bass engineering
- Anup Sastry – drum engineering, engineering, mixing
- Alan Douches – mastering
- Kenny Eaton – guitar, re-assembly
- Richard Houghten – lacquer cut
- Josh Nall – artwork

== Charts ==
Chart (2017)	Peak position
US Billboard 200	98
US Top Rock Albums (Billboard)	5
US Top Hard Rock Albums (Billboard)	4
US Independent Albums (Billboard)	12
US Heatseekers Albums (Billboard)	1
US Top Album Sales (Billboard)	54
