= No More Pain (band) =

American band

- Origin: New Jersey
- Genres: Progressive metal; progressive rock; hard rock
- Years active: 2008–present
- Label: Marquee Inc. (Japan only)
- Members: Mike Roman; Matt McDermott; John Moroney; Dan Rainone
- Past members: Mike Rainone; Mike Santini; Jay Weinstein; Ryan Sullivan
- Website: nomorepainmusic.com

No More Pain is an American progressive metal band from central New Jersey. Formed in 2008, the band has released two albums and two EPs.

== History ==
No More Pain formed in 2008 when guitarist/singer Mike Roman and drummer/singer Ryan Sullivan disbanded their previous metalcore band Ministry of Pain and began working on more radio friendly material. Influences of progressive rock crept in, and soon they recruited bassist Jay Weinstein. In 2009 they recorded a self-titled demo, and shortly after added keyboardist Matt McDermott. Wanting to place Sullivan as the front man, drummer Dan Rainone joined in early 2010, and shortly after Mike Santini was added as a second guitarist.
The six-member lineup soon went into the studio to record 2011's Debate and Rhyme. While in the studio, Sullivan and Santini left the band, and Roman took over lead vocal duties and Dan's brother Mike Rainone joined as second guitarist/vocalist. but left in early 2012. Weinstein left the band in early 2013 and was replaced by John Moroney.
The now four-member lineup went into the studio in early 2014 to record 2015's The Post Human Condition. The album brought them enough attention to get them on the lineup of Rites of Spring festival in 2016. The album was also released in Japan after signing with the record label Marquee Inc.
In 2016 they released The Spader EP, which was in dedication to one Indiegogo supporter for The Post Human Condition. In 2017 they released the Live EP, which features a 2014 show and a new studio track.

The band has shared the stage with such artists as King's X, Spock's Beard, Psychostick, Fuel, Stick Men, Scale the Summit, Next to None, Monster Magnet, Thank You Scientist, Stu Hamm, Jon Herington, and Angel Vivaldi
They were nominated for several Asbury Music Awards in 2015 and 2016, and are frequent headliners at the Local Legends Festival in New Jersey.

== Influences ==
The band has listed such influences as Dream Theater, Pink Floyd, Steely Dan, Alice in Chains, Soundgarden, Tool, Genesis and Frank Zappa

== Members ==
=== Current ===
- Mike Roman – guitar, vocals(2008–present)
- Matt McDermott – keyboards, vocals (2009–present)
- Dan Rainone – drums (2010–present)
- John Moroney – bass, vocals (2013–present)

=== Former ===
- Ryan Sullivan – vocals (2008–2011), drums (2008-2010)
- Jay Weinstein – bass (2008–2013)
- Mike Santini – guitar (2010–2011)
- Mike Rainone – guitar, vocals (2011–2012)

== Discography ==
=== Studio albums ===
- Debate and Rhyme (2011)
- The Post Human Condition (2015)

=== EPs ===
- The Spader EP (2016)
- Live EP (2017)
