= Angel Vivaldi =

American guitarist & songwriter (born 1985)

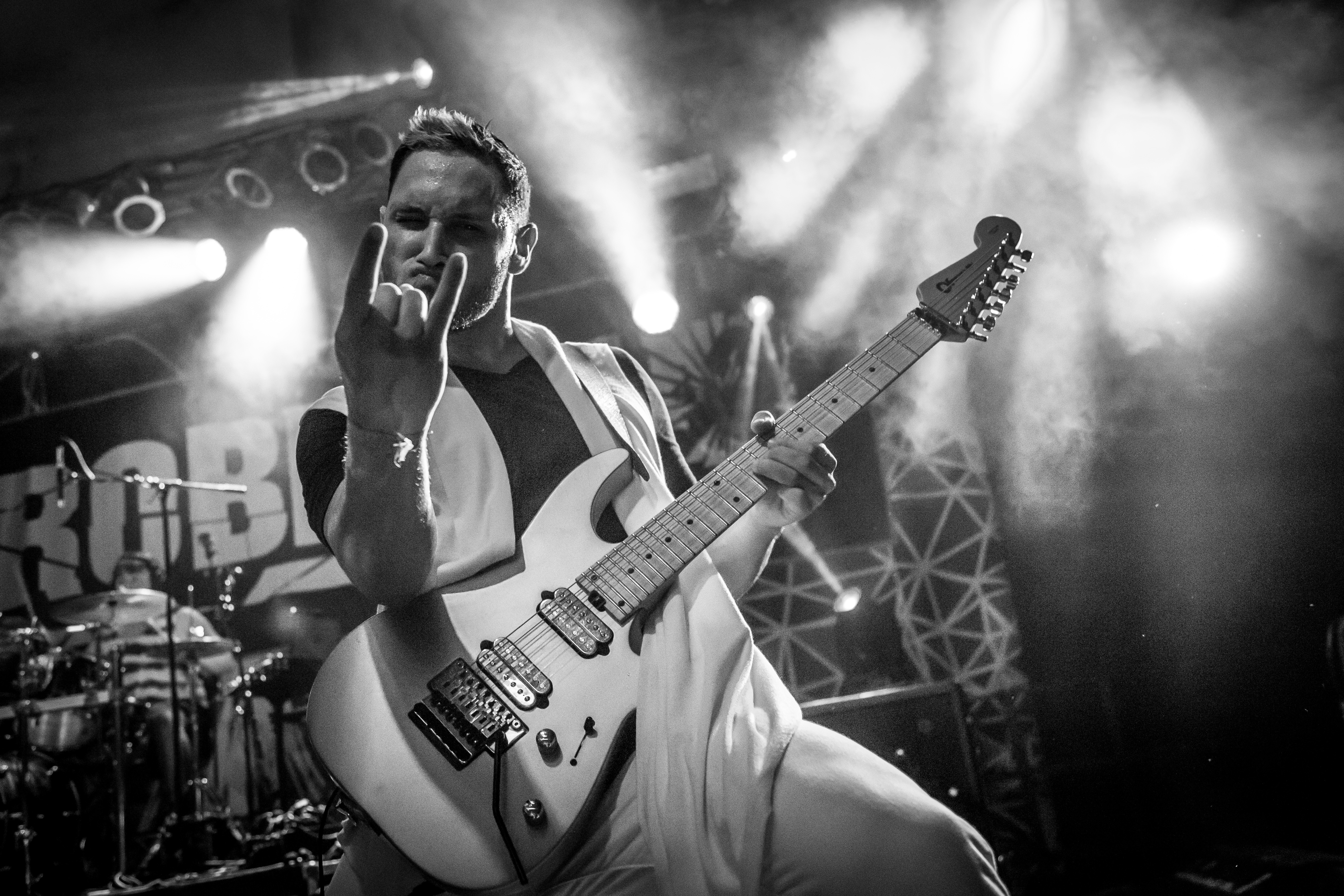
- Angel Vivaldi at Euroblast Festival 2017

Background information
- Born: June 13, 1985 (age 41); New Jersey, United States
- Genres: Instrumental rock, progressive metal, neoclassical metal, hard rock
- Occupations: Musician, songwriter
- Instruments: Guitar, bass
- Years active: 2003–present
- Formerly of: Vext, Black Market Hero
- Website: angelvivaldiofficial.com

Angel Vivaldi (born June 13, 1985) is an American guitarist, songwriter and producer. He began his solo career in 2003. Vivaldi has self-released five records, Revelations, The Speed of Dark, Universal Language, Away with Words: Part 1, and Synapse. In 2015, he released a cover of Joe Satriani's "Crystal Planet" single. Vivaldi is known for his virtuoso guitar playing style and cinematic music videos.

== Early life ==
Born in New Jersey to a Puerto Rican family, Vivaldi grew up on dance music, freestyle music and Spanish music. He started playing guitar at 15 and is self-taught. He cites Nirvana, Megadeth, Yngwie Malmsteen and Eric Johnson as early influences. Vivaldi was strongly discouraged from becoming a musician by his family and had little support from them.

== Music career ==
=== Early career ===
Vivaldi performed live regionally for four years before recording any music (other than demos). After releasing his debut album, "Revelations", in 2008 (which since then has been removed from all outlets), he joined Black Market Hero. He released his second EP titled The Speed of Dark in 2009 (which saw a re-recording/re-release in August 2016) and uploaded his first play-through of Acid Reign on YouTube shortly thereafter.

He competed in Guitar Player magazine's "Guitar Superstar Competition" in 2010 with judges George Lynch and Gary Hoey.

=== Universal Language, Vext ===
Released in May 2011, Vivaldi recorded Universal Language with producer Will Putney. It became a viral success following the release of two music videos for "A Mercurian Summer" and "A Martian Winter". Despite critical acclaim and success, it would be four years before any extensive touring was done.

Shortly after the release of Universal Language, Tommy Vext (ex-Divine Heresy, ex-Snot, ex-Bad Wolves) approached Vivaldi about joining his supergroup Vext which featured members of Mutiny Within. Vivaldi recorded and performed on the band's debut EP titled Impermanence. Vext was offered record deals however Vivaldi left due to not being ready to sign a contract.

=== Away with Words and present day ===
2014 would see the release of Away with Words: Part 1 which was also produced by Will Putney. The songs are titled from 1 to 5 in Morse Code. This album cycle also saw two music video releases for the songs " ▄ ▄▄▄ ▄▄▄ ▄▄▄ ▄▄▄ " (One) and " ▄ ▄ ▄▄▄ ▄▄▄ ▄▄▄ " (Two). Vivaldi began touring in 2015 with a headlining US/Canada tour with The Algorithm. He continued to tour extensively throughout 2016, ending with co-headlining US tour with Gus G (Ozzy Osbourne, Firewind).

It was announced in 2015 that Away with Words: Part 2, a primarily acoustic release, would be put on hold to focus instead on a full album called Synapse. Though the album was slated to be released in 2016, its eventual release date was October 6, 2017. The EP Away with Words: Part 2 was finally released in April 2023, containing songs Six ( ▄▄▄ ▄ ▄ ▄ ▄ ), Seven ( ▄▄▄ ▄▄▄ ▄ ▄ ▄ ), Eight ( ▄▄▄ ▄▄▄ ▄▄▄ ▄ ▄ ), Nine ( ▄▄▄ ▄▄▄ ▄▄▄ ▄▄▄ ▄ ), and Zero ( ▄▄▄ ▄▄▄ ▄▄▄ ▄▄▄ ▄▄▄ ).

In 2024, he recorded a cover of New Country by Jean-Luc Ponty with Steve Morse and violonist Siobhan Cronin.

== Philanthropic work ==
Vivaldi participated in the annual Jemfest event held in Orlando, Florida. Its aim was to raise money for Steve Vai's Make A Noise Foundation. Vivaldi performed in 2005, 2006, 2007 and 2010 which featured a masterclass from Steve Vai.

Following the events of the 2016 Orlando nightclub shooting, Vivaldi broadcast a six-hour live stream to raise funds for the victims and their families.

After losing his friend to ALS in 2014, Vivaldi launched a live broadcast with Chris Letchford of Scale the Summit called "Shred for ALS", raising money for ALS research at the ALS Therapy Development Institute.

Angel organized the "Shred for Australia" Livestream to raise money for the 2020 fires featuring musicians such as Herman Li, Tosin Abasi, Nita Strauss, Michael Angelo Batio, Matt Heafy of Trivium, Cole Rolland, Gus G and more.

He practices meditation stating that it helps with getting focused while on tour or in the studio.

== Influences ==
Vivaldi holds Kurt Cobain as one of his biggest inspirations to picking up the guitar. Today his influences include Carmen Miranda, Kaki King, Jean-Luc Ponty, Evergrey, Misery Signals, Parkway Drive and Mattias Eklundh.

== Equipment ==
Vivaldi had been a long-time user of seven string Ibanez guitars, primarily an RG7CT called "Dorothy". He can be seen using various Ibanez 7-strings throughout his videos, but he records and performs mainly with "Dorothy".

He uses Mesa Boogie amps, Fractal Audio Axe FX 2 XL and DiMarzio pickups.

In 2018 Vivaldi was endorsed by guitar manufacturer Charvel, which made him a seven string variant of their "DK-24" as a signature model.

== Discography ==
=== Angel Vivaldi ===
- Revelations (2008)
- The Speed of Dark [EP] (2009)
- Universal Language [EP] (2011)
- Away with Words: Part 1 [EP] (2014)
- Crystal Planet (digital single) feat. Dan Sugarman (2015)
- The Speed of Dark: Revisited [EP] (2016)
- Synapse (2017)
- Wave of Synergy (digital single) feat. Andy James (2018)
- Triple Helix (digital single) feat. Cole Rolland (2019)
- Away with Words: Part 2 [EP] (2023)

=== Vext ===
- Impermanence [EP] (2012)

== Band members ==
- Angel Vivaldi – lead guitar (2003–present)
- Jason Tarantino – rhythm guitar (2009–present)
- Bill Fore – drums (2010–present)

=== Former members ===
- Jake Skylyr – bass (2007–2017)

== Concert tours ==
- Touring You Apart, 2015 – Angel Vivaldi, The Algorithm, Save Us from the Archon
- The Shape of Color Tour, 2016 – Intervals, Plini, Angel Vivaldi, Save Us from the Archon
- Operation Domination, 2016 – Angel Vivaldi, Gus G
- The Wave of Synergy European Tour, 2017 – Angel Vivaldi, Andy James, The Fine Constant
- The Guitar Collective, 2017 – Angel Vivaldi, Andy James, Scale the Summit
- Melodic Decadence Tour, 2018 – Angel Vivaldi, Hyvmine, Day of Reckoning
- The Guitar Collective, 2018 – Angel Vivaldi, Nita Strauss, Jacky Vincent
- Electric Guitarlands, 2024 – Angel Vivaldi, Nick Johnston, Rowan Robertson
