= Memory palace (disambiguation) =

The memory palace is a common term for the memory recall technique method of loci. It may also refer to:

- Memory Palace: Vernacular Culture in the Digital Age, a documentary website from Clarke Mackey
- Memory Palace, a novella by Hari Kunzru
  - The associated exhibition at London's Victoria and Albert museum
- Memory Palace (2008 album), an album from Scottish musicians Paul Haig and Billy Mackenzie
- Memory Palace (album), the fifth album from progressive metal band Intervals
- Memory Palace, a track on the album Coma Ecliptic from progressive metal band Between the Buried and Me
- Memory Palace, a track on the album Automatic (Mildlife album) from Australian psychedelic jazz fusion group, Mildlife.
- Memory Palace, a 1990 flute composition by Elizabeth Brown
- "Memory Palace", a 1992 performance show featuring La Fura dels Baus, with text by William Gibson
- The Memory Palace, a historical podcast hosted by Nate DiMeo
- The Memory Palace, a clarinet–cello–piano trio by Ann Callaway
- The Memory Palace, a 2011 baritone and piano work by Gabriel Kahane
