= Voice Within =

Voice Within or Voices Within may refer to:

== TV and film ==
- Voices Within: The Lives of Truddi Chase, ABC-Network miniseries based on the autobiography of Truddi Chase
- The Voice Within (film), a 1946 British film

== Music ==
- A Voice Within, a 2014 album by Intervals
- Voices Within, 1999 album by Ilse Huizinga
- Voices from Within, a 2008 album by Israeli metal band Distorted
- "The Voice Within", song by Christina Aguilera 2002
