= Sabrosa (disambiguation) =

Sabrosa is a city and a municipality in northern Portugal. It may also refer to:

- "Sabrosa", a song by the Beastie Boys from the album Ill Communication
- "Sabrosa", a song by Scale the Summit from the album The Migration
- Luciano Sabrosa (born 1979), Brazilian footballer
- Simão Sabrosa (born 1979), Portuguese footballer
