= The Shape of Colour =

Studio album by Intervals
- Released: December 4, 2015
- Length: 34:44
- Label: Self-released
- Producers: Aaron Marshall; Cameron McLellan; Anthony Calabretta

Intervals chronology
A Voice Within (2014)	The Shape of Colour (2015)	The Way Forward (2017)

Singles from The Shape of Colour
- 1. "I'm Awake" Released: November 11, 2015; 2. "Fable" Released: November 19, 2015

The Shape of Colour is the second studio album by Canadian instrumental progressive metal band Intervals. The album was self-released on December 4, 2015. It was produced by Aaron Marshall, Cameron McLellan and Anthony Calabretta.

== Critical reception ==
Professional ratings
Review scores
Source	Rating
Distorted Sound	8/10
Exclaim!	7/10
KillYourStereo	4/5 stars
MetalSucks	4/5 stars
New Noise Magazine	Positive

The album received generally positive reviews from music critics. Distorted Sound scored the album 8 out of 10 and said: "The Shape of Colour is definitely one of 2015's better releases and the better out of Intervals releases this year too, fresh content like this is awesome to hear out of a band that has a near constantly cycling roster. Highly recommended to all fans of Djent and Prog Metal, Intervals are a really nice project that produce some insane music. The market for Instrumental is wide but still feels very much untapped, The Shape of Colour shatters that mould entirely."

Calum Slingerland of Exclaim! gave it 7 out of 10 and said: "Combined with shorter song lengths, Marshall's latest approach highlights his heightened attention to phrasing and melody — one that is nearly on par with those of his more revered peers."

Alex Sievers from KillYourStereo gave the album 4 out of 5 and said: "Instrumental music is definitely on the up right now, and as it becomes more and more popular, we're going to be getting a lot more artists like Intervals delivering the goods before the inevitable plunge off the cliff into the shitty, saturated abyss. And if that's the case, then we have some damn fine records ahead of us. Before the plunge, that is."

Phil Boozeman of MetalSucks rated the album 4 out of 5 and said that "overall, it's fantastic".

== Track listing ==
The Shape of Colour track listing
No.	Title	Length
1.	"I'm Awake"	3:58
2.	"Sure Shot"	4:07
3.	"Fable" (featuring Leland Whitty of BadBadNotGood)	4:19
4.	"Sweet Tooth"	3:27
5.	"Black Box"	3:04
6.	"Slight of Hand" (featuring Nick Johnston)	5:41
7.	"Meridian"	5:09
8.	"Libra" (featuring Plini)	4:56
Total length:		34:44

== Personnel ==
Intervals

- Aaron Marshall – guitars, co-production

Additional musicians

- Travis Orbin – drums, percussion
- Leland Whitty of BadBadNotGood – guest saxophone on track 3
- Nick Johnston – guest guitar on track 6
- Plini – guest guitar on track 8

Additional personnel

- Cameron McLellan – co-production, engineering, bass
- Anthony Calabretta – co-production, mixing, mastering
- Justin Bonfini – drum engineering
- Daniel Wagner – artwork
