= Cole Rolland =

- Born: Stephen Cole Rolland; December 5, 1993 (age 32); Ontario, Canada
- Origin: Port Elgin
- Genres: Rock, Metal and Classical
- Years active: 2009-present
- Label: Independent

YouTube information
- Channel: ColeRolland
- Subscribers: 1.53 million
- Views: 412 million
- Last updated: April 2026

Cole Rolland (born December 5, 1993) is a Canadian artist, producer, guitarist and social media personality known for his electric guitar covers, most notably the recreation of dubstep songs. As of July 31, 2026, Rolland has more than 1.53M YouTube subscribers and nearly 413M video views.

== Biography ==
Rolland was born on December 5, 1993, in Port Elgin in Canada. He started self-learning and playing guitar at the age of 10. At the age of 15 in 2009, he recorded and uploaded a YouTube video performance of DragonForce's "Through the Fire and Flames" from the Guitar Hero video game series. Shortly after, he also released a cover of "Canon Rock". Both of these videos collectively gained 52 million views on YouTube.

After school, Rolland worked as a process operator at Nova Chemicals before pursuing a musical career since 2019. He performs rock, metal and classical covers on his electric guitar of artists including Skrillex, Krewella, Slipknot, Metallica and Avenged Sevenfold. Rolland makes use of a variety of guitar techniques including slides/vibrato, along with various implementations of the whammy bar, and a killswitch.

As of July 31, 2026, Rolland's YouTube channel has 1.53M subscribers and nearly 413M views.

== Acts ==
Rolland has performed stage acts with ILLENIUM, Adventure Club, Krewella and DragonForce. He has also collaborated with Sophie Lloyd for Beethoven’s 5th Symphony.

== Gear ==
Rolland has a signature guitar line in association with California-based guitar manufacturer Kiesel Guitars, Midnight and Moonlight signature guitars.

Guitars

- CR6 Midnight Signature Guitar
- CR6 Moonlight Signature Guitar
- DC600 Custom Pink-Purple Burst
- DC600 Custom Purple-Blue Burst
- DC700 Custom

Hardware

- Axe-Fx III by Fractal Audio
- Jim Dunlop Wah
- Digitech Whammy Pedal
- Digitech Drop Pedal
- Fractal Audio FC-12
- Universal Audio x4
- Neumann TLM 193
- Neumann TLM 103

Software

- Logic Pro X
- Adobe Premiere Pro
- STL Tones
- Waves: Mercury
- SoundToys: Effect Rack

== Discography ==
Singles

- Echo (2023)
- Lost (with Sophie Lloyd) (2023)
- Ignite (2021)
- Triple Helix (with Angel Vivaldi) (2020)
- Equinox (2016)
- The Last Night (2016)

EPs

- Passenger (2019)
