= V (Scale the Summit album) =

Studio album by Scale the Summit
- Released: September 18, 2015
- Studios: Basement Studios, Winston-Salem, North Carolina
- Genres: Progressive metal; djent; instrumental rock
- Length: 50:59
- Label: Prosthetic
- Producers: Scale the Summit; Jeff Penalber

Scale the Summit chronology
| The Migration (2013) | V (2015) | In a World of Fear (2017) |

Singles from V
- 1. "Stolas" Released: July 10, 2015; 2. "Kestrel" Released: August 11, 2015; 3. "Blue Sun" Released: September 9, 2015

V (read as Five) is the fifth studio album by American instrumental progressive metal band Scale the Summit. It was released on September 18, 2015, through Prosthetic Records. The album was self-produced by the band and Jeff Penalber. It is their last album to be released on this label before the band decided to release their work independently. It is the band's only album with drummer J.C. Bryant. It is also the band's last album with bassist Mark Michell and original rhythm guitarist Travis Levrier.

== Background and recording ==
On October 14, 2014, Scale the Summit are expecting to begin tracking their new album in November. On January 5, 2015, the band headed to the studio and began tracking the album on January 7. According to the band, the process is expected to continue for the next two months. On March 23, they revealed the title of the album. On June 29, the album has been given a release date on September 18. Along with the date comes a preview of the album's opening cut, "The Winged Bull", as well as see the first piece of artwork to be revealed.

== Promotion and release ==
On July 1, 2015, a second tease of new material from Scale the Summit has been posted, with the preview of "The Golden Bird" available. The same day, a third audio preview of the track "Kestrel" has been uploaded. On July 4, two more song clips of the tracks "Oort Cloud" and "Soria Moria" have been published. On July 6, they unveiled the clip of the new song "Pontus Euxinus". On July 7, the band premiered the teaser is for the song "Trapped in Ice". On July 9, two more new songs titled "Blue Sun" and "The Isle of Mull" from the band's album are now available for preview.

== Critical reception ==
Professional ratings
Review scores
| Source | Rating |
|---|---|
| Blabbermouth.net | 8.5/10 |
| Metal Injection | 8.5/10 |
| Sputnikmusic | 3.6/5 stars |

Ray Van Horn, Jr. from Blabbermouth.net gave the album 8.5 out of 10 and said: "As with previous compositions, Scale the Summit dials back and harmonizes with soothing poise as set up to thicker progressions. Thus the heavier motif of V gives Scale the Summit even more muscle than they came into this album with. As if they hadn't already hit their zenith four years ago on The Collective." Metal Injection rated the album 8.5 out of 10 and stated, "On September 18th, Scale the Summit's V will be available to consume. With every fine piece of work, the patient observation and evaluation will yield a greater experience. Don't expect V to come alive and speak to you on the first listen, allow it to feed you the reasons why it will be one of the best instrumental albums of 2015."

== Track listing ==
| No. | Title | Length |
|---|---|---|
| 1. | "The Winged Bull" | 4:25 |
| 2. | "Soria Moria" | 5:50 |
| 3. | "Pontus Euxinus" | 4:15 |
| 4. | "Trapped in Ice" | 4:21 |
| 5. | "Stolas" | 4:59 |
| 6. | "The Isle of Mull" | 4:33 |
| 7. | "Kestrel" | 4:54 |
| 8. | "Oort Cloud" | 5:28 |
| 9. | "Blue Sun" | 7:04 |
| 10. | "The Golden Bird" | 5:05 |
| Total length: | | 50:59 |

== Personnel ==
Credits adapted from AllMusic.

Scale the Summit

- Chris Letchford – lead guitar, layout
- Travis Levrier – rhythm guitar
- Mark Michell – bass
- J.C. Bryant – drums

Additional personnel

- Jeff Penalber – production, engineering, recording
- Scale the Summit – production
- Jamie King – mixing, mastering
- Duncan Storr – artwork

== Charts ==
| Chart (2015) | Peak position |
|---|---|
| US Top Rock Albums (Billboard) | 36 |
| US Top Hard Rock Albums (Billboard) | 14 |
| US Independent Albums (Billboard) | 29 |
| US Heatseekers Albums (Billboard) | 5 |
| US Top Album Sales (Billboard) | 100 |
