= Kiesel Guitars =

American guitar manufacturer

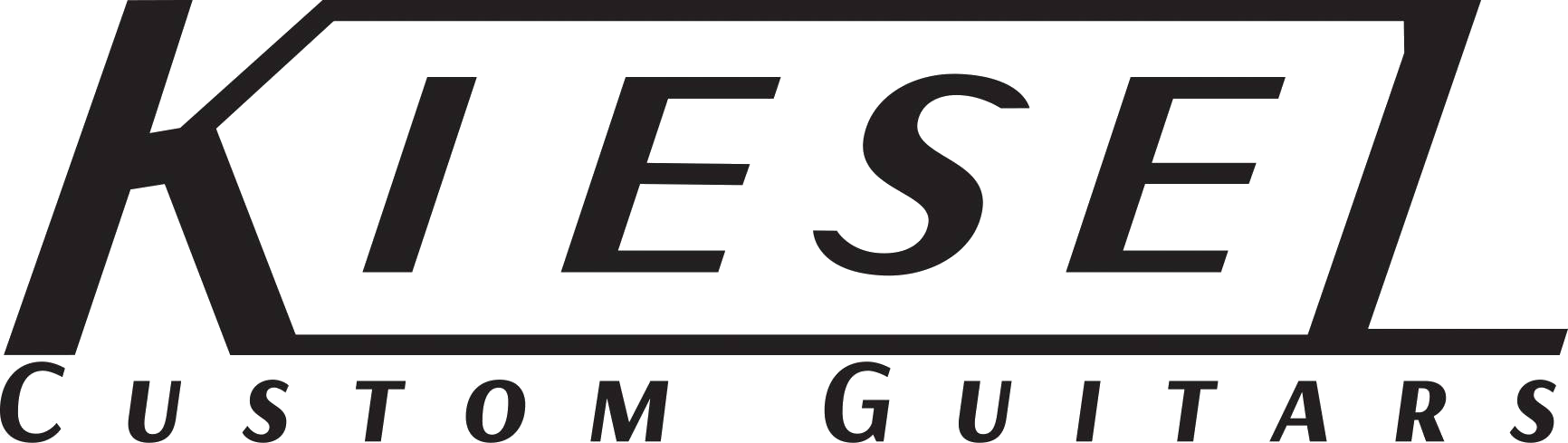
- Company type: Private
- Industry: Musical Instruments
- Founded: 2015; 11 years ago
- Headquarters: Escondido, California, United States of America
- Area served: Global
- Key people: Mark Kiesel (president); Jeff Kiesel (VP)
- Products: Electric guitars, electric bass guitars
- Number of employees: 50+
- Website: www.kieselguitars.com

Kiesel Guitars is an American manufacturer of custom electric guitars and electric bass guitars located in Southern California, with a heritage dating back to 1946. In 2015, Kiesel Guitars split from Carvin Corporation, taking the guitar and bass portions of Carvin.

== History ==
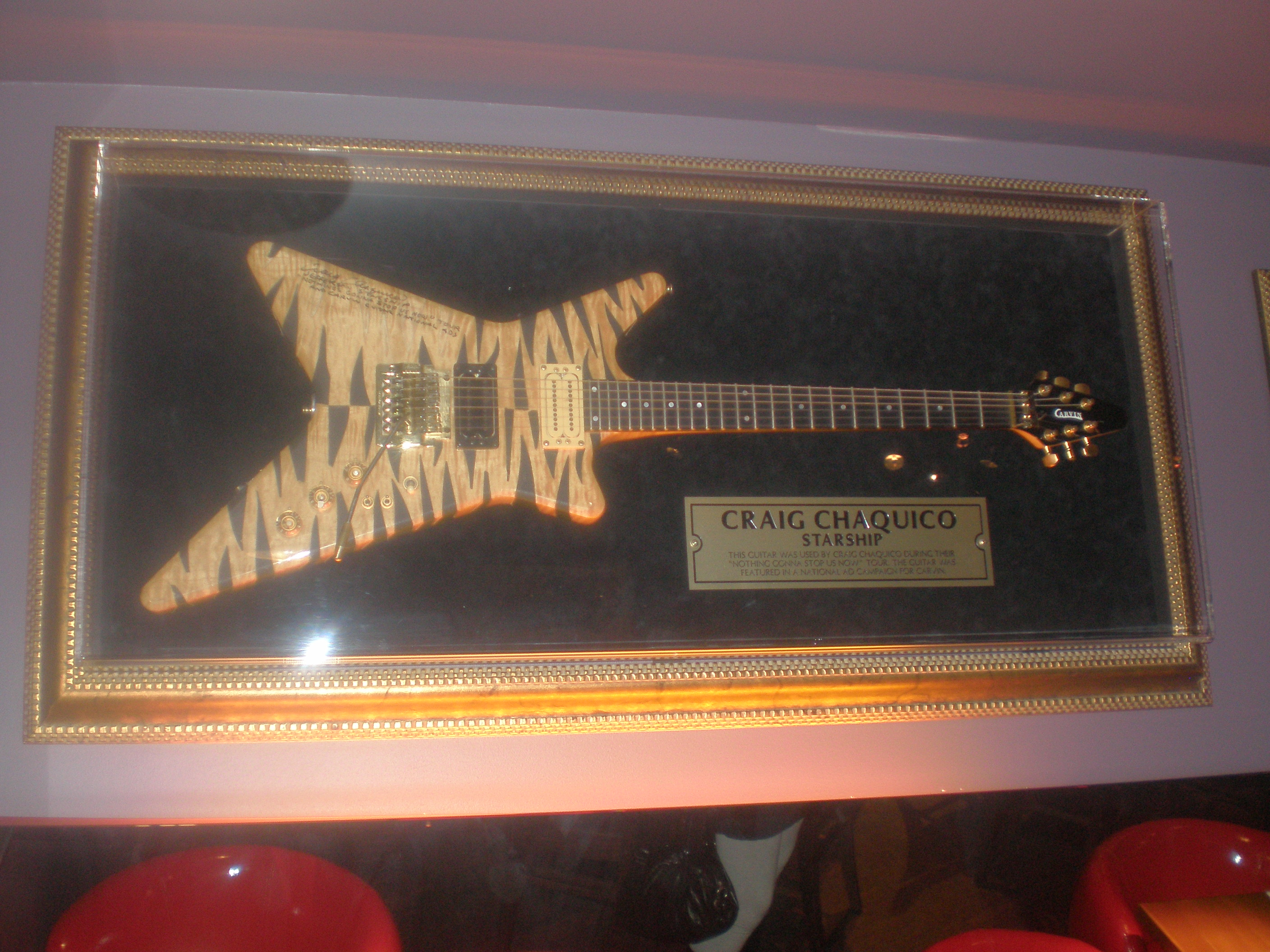
Carvin Guitar's model V220, custom built for Craig Chaquico of Jefferson Starship

Lowell Kiesel founded the L. C. Kiesel Company in San Diego, California in 1946, to manufacture guitar pickups. By 1947, the company manufactured steel guitars in Gothenburg, Nebraska. Around 1948, it returned to Southern California—and, in 1949, moved to Baldwin Park, California, where the company name changed to Carvin Corporation, after Kiesel's two eldest sons, Carson and Gavin. Starting in the 1970s, Mark Kiesel took over the guitar department and started offering custom instruments made to order to allow customers to choose from a range of available body shapes, woods, colors, electronics, and other features. In 1995, Jeff Kiesel started working for the company, and in 2011 he began to help with design and instrument development.

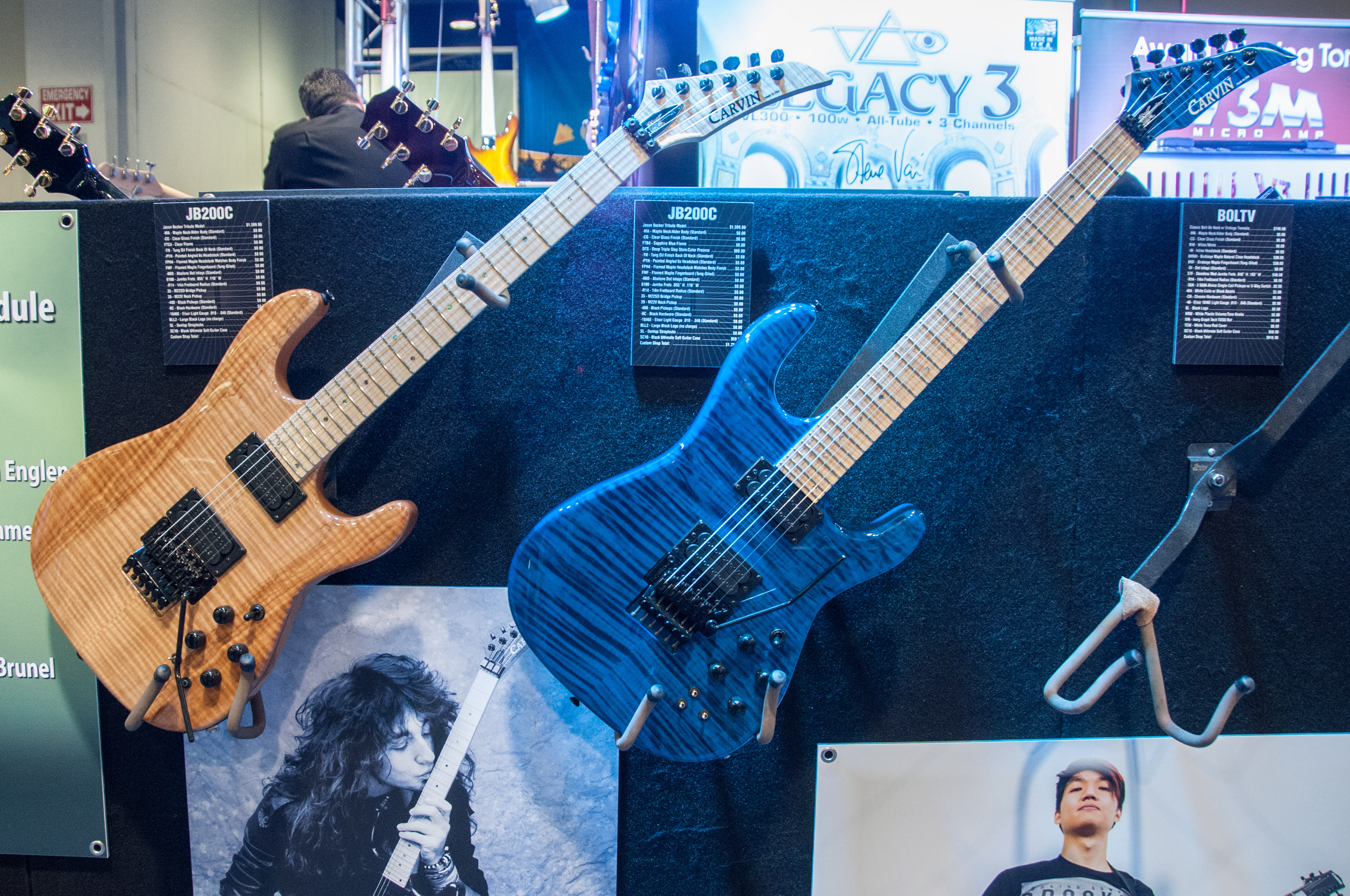
Carvin Guitar's JB200C Jason Becker Tribute Guitar, at the 2014 NAMM Show

In 2015, Carvin Corporation split its business units, and Kiesel Guitars was founded to take over the guitar and bass manufacturing, as a wholly separate company. The original Kiesel name and logo was chosen to honor founder Lowell Kiesel. The new company continues to build electric, acoustic electric, MIDI, synth, semi hollow, chambered, headless guitars and basses, along with necks, bodies, kits and a full parts department under the Carvin Guitars name as well as new Kiesel name. Kiesel Guitars opened up sales globally following the name change. The company employed over 50 people and produced almost 4,000 custom made instruments per year. It is run by President Mark Kiesel (Lowell Kiesel's middle son) and Vice President Jeff Kiesel (Mark's son). Jeff Kiesel's two children also work for the company when not attending school full-time.

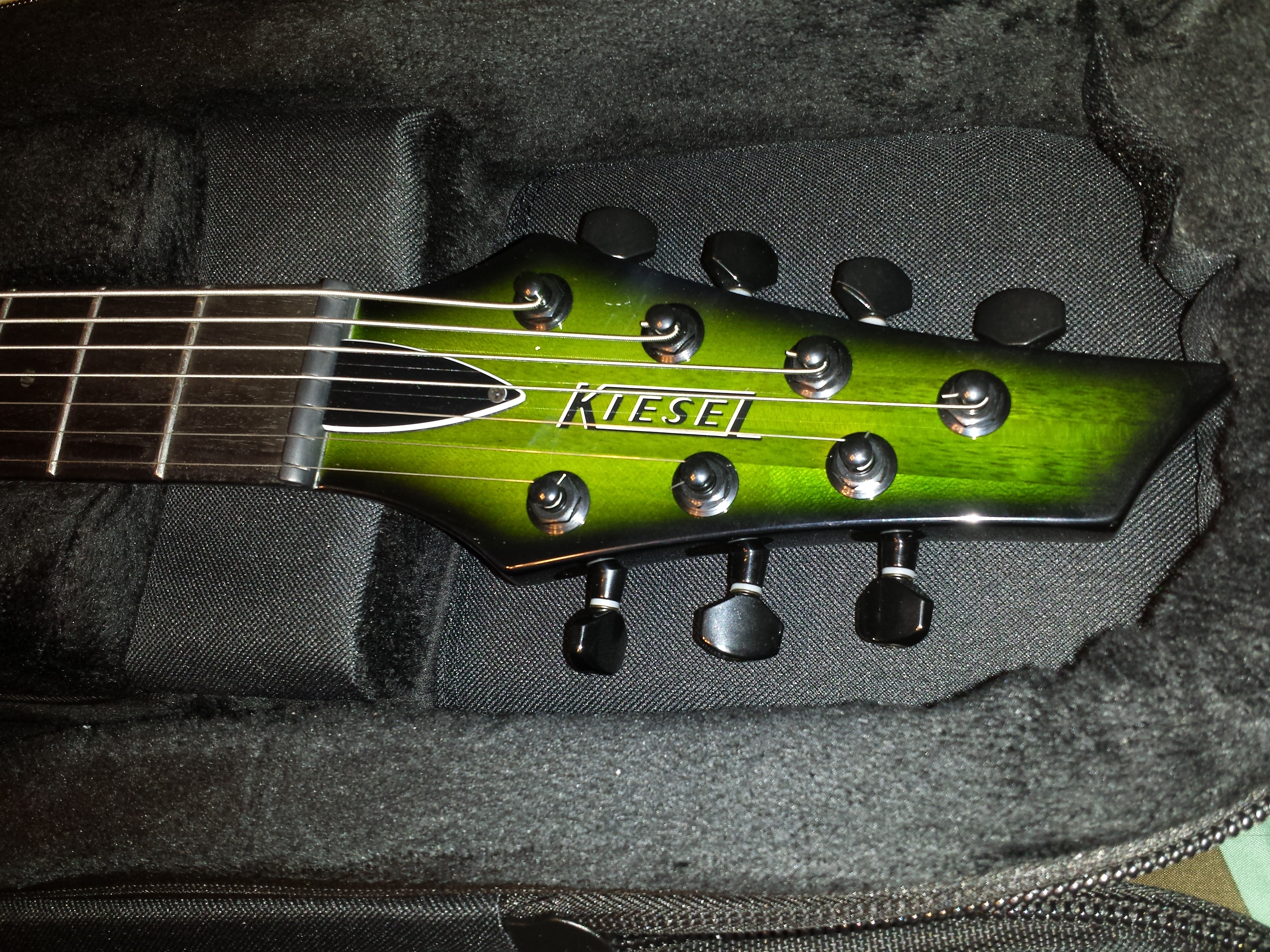
Example of a Kiesel Guitar's 4x3 headstock design

In January 2015, Kiesel Guitars won Revolver's Best of Show award at the winter NAMM Show, for their headless guitar model, the Vader. At the 2016 Winter NAMM, Super NAMM Awards were won from Guitar Aficionado for their 70th anniversary K-series model, and from Guitar World for their 24-fret bolt-on Aries model.

== Notable artists ==
Jason Becker has been a long time endorser of Carvin Guitars, and Kiesel offers tribute models in his honor. The JB200C was based on the original DC200 models that Jason played, while the newer JB24 "Numbers" guitar was based on Jason's original Peavey custom model with the numbered fretboard markers.

Allan Holdsworth was an endorser, and Kiesel has had several models based on Holdsworth's designs, including headless and MIDI synth variants. Frank Gambale has a semi-hollow carved top, available with MIDI synth. Greg Howe's has 24-fret bolt-on signature models. Neil Zaza's signature is based on the Carved Top model line, featuring his preferred control layout. Craig Chaquico has a signature thinline acoustic/electric model. Lee McKinney of Born of Osiris has signature six and seven string models, based on the DC600 model line. Bassist Brian Bromberg has a series of basses based on a body of his design, while Roy Vogt has a signature 6-string model based on the Vanquish model. Chris Letchford of Scale the Summit has a headless multiscale signature series, with a "set through neck". Other endorsers include Anna Sentina, Johnny Hiland and Mark Okubo of Veil of Maya. Blue Öyster Cult frontman Donald "Buck Dharma" Roeser became an endorser of Kiesel Guitars and played a headless Vader 6 on August 2015.

Gallery of artists playing with Kiesel guitars

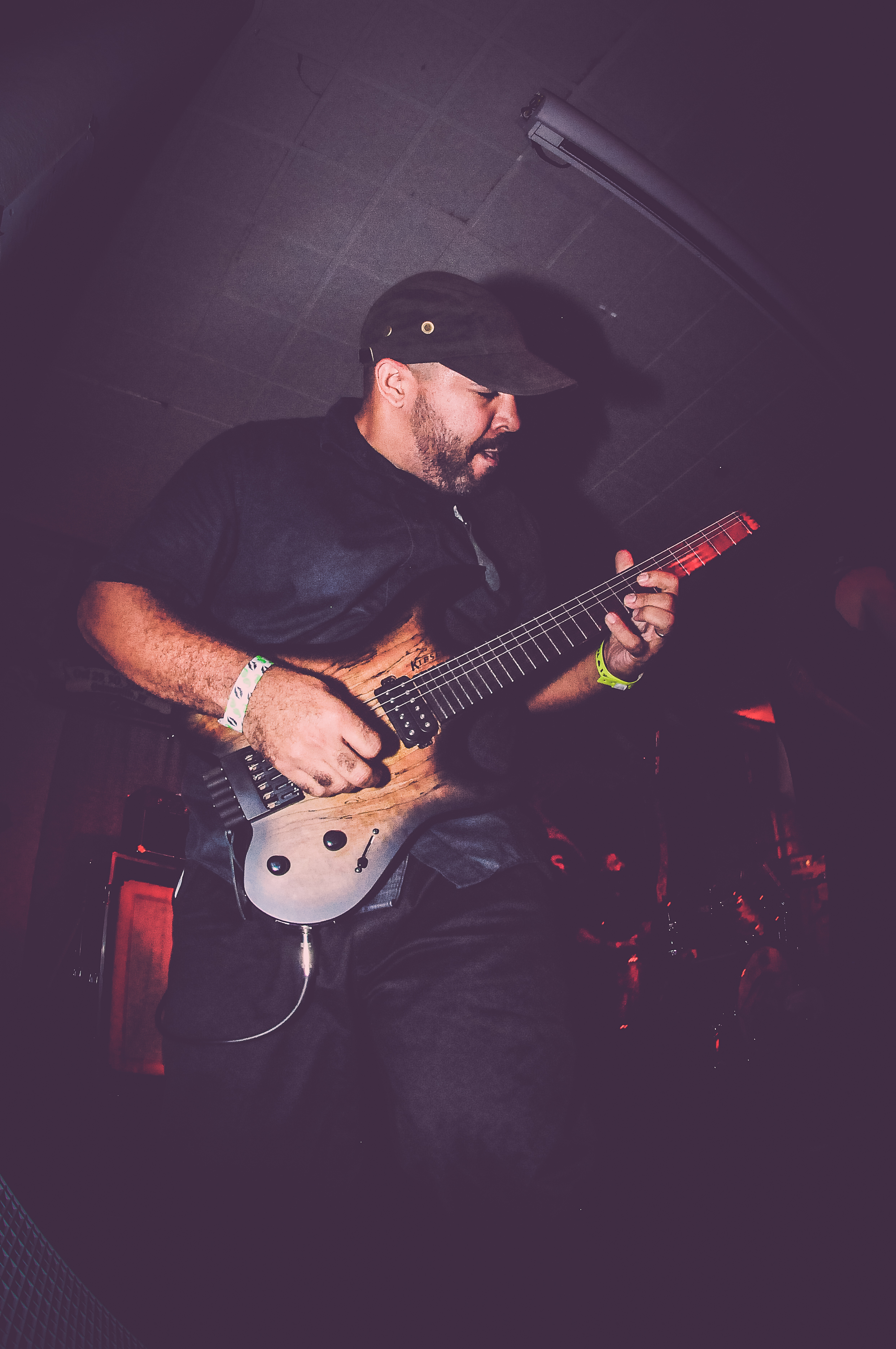
As Friends Rust guitarist Joseph Simmons performing at The Fest 14 in Gainesville, Florida with a Kiesel Vader headless guitar.

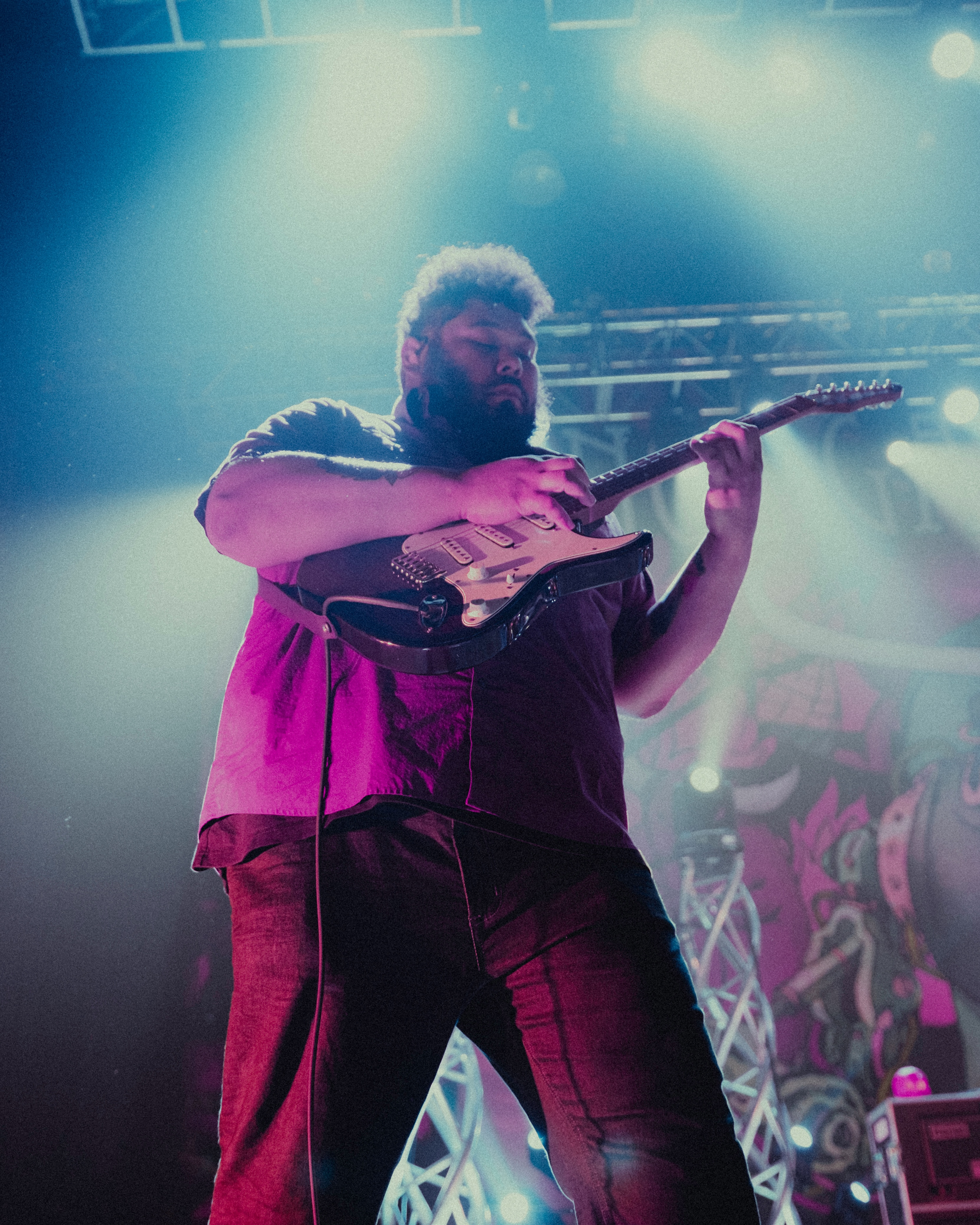
Dance Gavin Dance guitarist Will Swan with a Kiesel Delos.
