= Marrow Deep =

Studio album by Mastodon
- Released: August 28, 2026
- Recorded: September 2025
- Studios: West End Sound, Atlanta
- Genres: Progressive metal; sludge metal; stoner metal
- Length: 65:23
- Label: Loma Vista
- Producers: Patrik Berger; Kurt Ballou

Mastodon chronology
Hushed and Grim (2021)	Marrow Deep (2026)

Singles from Marrow Deep
- 1. "Your Ghost Again" Released: June 2, 2026; 2. "Snakes for Dinner" Released: July 13, 2026; 3. "In the Ruins" Released: August 13, 2026

Marrow Deep is the ninth studio album by the American heavy metal band Mastodon. It was released on August 28, 2026, by Loma Vista Recordings, the band's first release on the label. Produced by Patrik Berger and Kurt Ballou, it is Mastodon's first album with guitarist Nick Johnston, following the departure and subsequent death of founding lead guitarist Brent Hinds in 2025, and the first with keyboardist João Nogueira as an official member. It is also Mastodon's first album as a five-piece band.

The album was recorded in 2025, inspired by the deaths of Brann Dailor's mother and Hinds. It was preceded by the lead single "Your Ghost Again", released in June, and "Snakes for Dinner", released in July featuring Josh Homme. The album was supported by the Poisonous Weapons tour, with Deafheaven and Alcest opening all dates.

== Background and release ==
Following the release of Hushed and Grim (2021), Mastodon spent several years writing and recording material for its ninth studio album. Throughout 2025 and 2026, drummer Brann Dailor stated in interviews that the album had been completed and was expected to be released during 2026. The recording process coincided with a period of transition for the band following the departure and death of founding guitarist Brent Hinds, with guitarist Nick Johnston joining the lineup and contributing to the album. Bill Kelliher later confirmed Johnston's involvement in the recording sessions. The album was produced by Patrik Berger and Kurt Ballou and mixed by Andrew Scheps.

The album was officially announced in July 2026 alongside the release of the lead single, "Snakes for Dinner", which features guest vocals by Josh Homme of Queens of the Stone Age. An accompanying music video directed by Deathcats was released simultaneously. The previously issued standalone single "Your Ghost Again" was subsequently confirmed to appear on the album. In support of Marrow Deep, Mastodon announced the Poisonous Weapons Tour of North America with Deafheaven and Alcest as supporting acts. The third single of the album, “In The Ruins”, was released on August 13 with an accompanying music video directed by Hey Beautiful Jerk.

== Composition ==
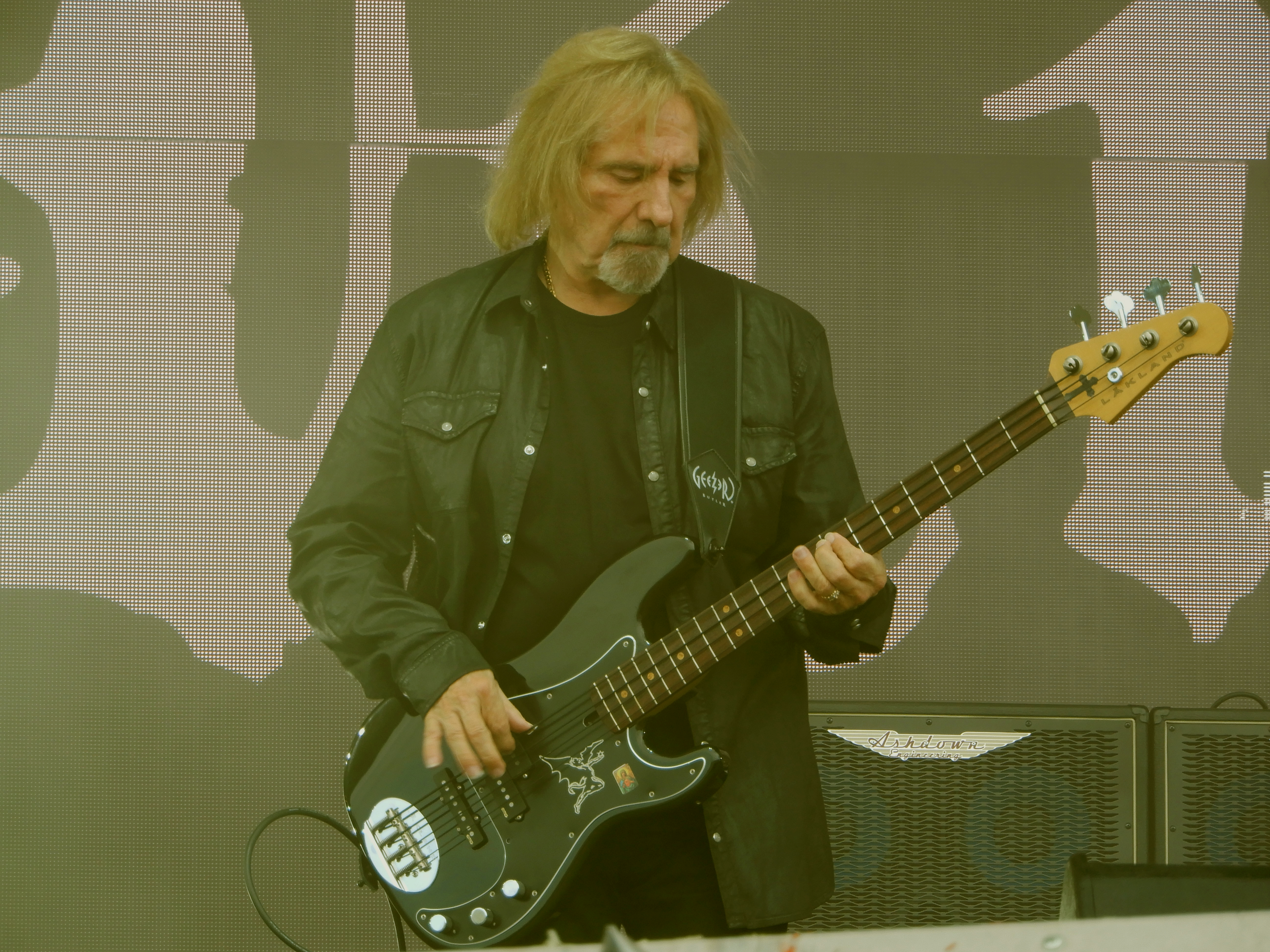
Geezer Butler of Black Sabbath plays bass on "The Vanishing".

Marrow Deep was influenced by a series of tragedies that the members of Mastodon faced, including the death of Dailor's mother and Hinds. As such, the album features a more "primitive, ritualistic" sound that abandons the psychedelic, progressive rock and punk rock elements that Hinds brought to the band's previous few albums for more straightforward heavy metal. More specifically, Marrow Deep has been described as a progressive metal, sludge metal and stoner metal album that reinforces Mastodon's heavier past rather than introducing new ideas. The only exception is more prominent synths due to keyboardist João Nogueira becoming a full-time member.

Numerous guest musicians are present on Marrow Deep, including Homme on "Snakes for Dinner" (who previously made a guest appearance on "Colony of Birchmen" from the album Blood Mountain), Neil Fallon of Clutch on "The Three Fates" (who previously made a guest appearance on "Blood and Thunder" from the album Leviathan), Geezer Butler of Black Sabbath and Joe Duplantier of Gojira on "The Vanishing" and Randy Blythe of Lamb of God on a "A Vampire's Demeanor".

== Critical reception ==
Professional ratings
Aggregate scores
Source	Rating
AnyDecentMusic?	7.7/10
Metacritic	81/100
Review scores
Source	Rating
AllMusic	3.5/5 stars
Clash	8/10
Consequence	A
Distorted Sound	9/10
Exclaim!	8/10
Kerrang!	4/5 stars
Metal Hammer	4.5/5 stars
Paste	B+
Pitchfork	6.9/10
Rolling Stone	4/5 stars

According to the review aggregator Metacritic, Marrow Deep received "universal acclaim" based on a weighted average score of 81 out of 100 from fifteen critic scores. Any Decent Music gave the album a weighted average score of 7.7 out of 10 from eleven critic scores.

== Track listing ==
All tracks are written by Brann Dailor, Bill Kelliher and Troy Sanders, except where noted.

Marrow Deep track listing
No.	Title	Writer(s)	Length
1.	"Barbarians Blood"		4:37
2.	"Poisonous Weapons"		5:00
3.	"Your Ghost Again"	Dailor; Kelliher; Sanders; Nick Johnston; João Nogueira	4:35
4.	"Snakes for Dinner"	Dailor; Kelliher; Sanders; Johnston; Nogueira	4:57
5.	"Out Like a Lamb"		5:38
6.	"In the Ruins"		5:37
7.	"They're Coming for You"	Dailor; Kelliher; Sanders; Johnston	5:14
8.	"Golden Spires"		5:39
9.	"Moth and Bone"		4:46
10.	"A Vampire's Demeanor"		4:50
11.	"The Vanishing"		6:43
12.	"The Three Fates"	Dailor; Kelliher; Sanders; Johnston; Nogueira	7:47
Total length:			65:23

Note

- Dialogue on "Poisonous Weapons" is taken from River's Edge.

== Personnel ==
Credits are adapted from the liner notes to Marrow Deep.

Mastodon

- Brann Dailor – drums, vocals
- Bill Kelliher – guitars
- Troy Sanders – bass guitar, vocals
- João Nogueira – keyboards
- Nick Johnston – guitars

Additional musicians

- Ben Koller – percussion on "Barbarians Blood"
- Joshua Homme – additional vocals on "Snakes for Dinner"
- Nate Newton – additional vocals on "A Vampire's Demeanor"
- Randy Blythe – additional vocals on "A Vampire's Demeanor"
- Joe Duplantier – additional vocals on "The Vanishing"
- Geezer Butler – bass guitar intro on "The Vanishing"
- Neil Fallon – additional vocals on "The Three Fates"

Production

- Kurt Ballou – production, engineering
- Patrik Berger – production
- Mastodon – co-production
- Miles Landrum – additional engineering
- Zach Weeks – editing
- Andrew Scheps – mixing
- Ted Jensen – mastering
- Paul Romano – art direction, artwork, design

== Charts ==
Chart performance for Marrow Deep
Chart (2026)	Peak position
Australian Albums (ARIA)	6
Austrian Albums (Ö3 Austria)	8
Belgian Albums (Ultratop Flanders)	13
Belgian Albums (Ultratop Wallonia)	4
Canadian Albums (Billboard)	64
Croatian International Albums (HDU)	31
Danish Vinyl Albums (Hitlisten)	3
Dutch Albums (Album Top 100)	25
Finnish Albums (Suomen virallinen lista)	6
French Albums (SNEP)	38
French Rock & Metal Albums (SNEP)	3
German Albums (Offizielle Top 100)	5
German Rock & Metal Albums (Offizielle Top 100)	2
Greek Albums (IFPI)	98
Hungarian Physical Albums (MAHASZ)	24
New Zealand Albums (RMNZ)	11
Norwegian Albums (IFPI Norge)	30
Norwegian Rock Albums (IFPI Norge)	2
Portuguese Albums (AFP)	71
Scottish Albums (Official Charts)	7
Spanish Albums (Promusicae)	25
Swedish Albums (Sverigetopplistan)	29
Swiss Albums (Schweizer Hitparade)	4
UK Albums (Official Charts)	27
UK Rock & Metal Albums (Official Charts)	3
US Billboard 200	40
US Independent Albums (Billboard)	4
US Top Rock & Alternative Albums (Billboard)	9
