= The Way Forward (Intervals album) =

Studio album by Intervals
- Released: December 1, 2017
- Length: 37:17
- Label: Self-released
- Producers: Aaron Marshall; Cameron McLellan; Simon Grove

Intervals chronology
| The Shape of Colour (2015) | The Way Forward (2017) | Circadian (2020) |

Singles from The Way Forward
- 1. "Touch and Go" Released: October 23, 2017; 2. "By Far and Away" Released: November 3, 2017; 3. "Rubicon Artist" Released: November 24, 2017

The Way Forward is the third studio album by Canadian instrumental progressive metal band Intervals. The album was self-released on December 1, 2017. It was produced by Aaron Marshall, Cameron McLellan and Simon Grove.

== Critical reception ==
Professional ratings
Review scores
| Source | Rating |
|---|---|
| Distorted Sound | 7/10 |
| Exclaim! | 7/10 |
| Heavy Blog Is Heavy | Positive |
| Louder Sound | 3/5 stars |
| Prog | Positive |

The album received generally positive reviews from music critics. Distorted Sound scored the album 7 out of 10 and said: "The Way Forward is a joy to listen to. It conjures and evokes feelings and emotions of pleasant memories long past, of fun and simplicity. It is an excellent instrumental record, if one simply seeks vibrant melodies and upbeat rhythms. However, there is no challenge. There is no conflict to the music. There is no push to something new. And as such, it ultimately may not be a particularly memorable record. It evokes much in the way of pleasant memories, but one may not remember this album in the years to come."

Lukas Wojcicki of Exclaim! gave it 7 out of 10 and said: "The Way Forward sits contentedly in one spot for its half-hour runtime — a runtime that works to the advantage of Intervals, though, as the experience is short, sweet, and comfortable. The tones are well-crafted, the technicality is impressive without seeming self-indulgent, the mix is pleasant to the ear, and the guitars sparkle and sing... but we already knew that." Louder Sound gave the album a positive review and stated: "Aaron's musical abilities are supreme, but he falls short as a memorable songwriter, the best records of this ilk creating distinct narratives akin to the best movie soundtracks. There's plenty to love in The Way Forward's technicolour tapestries, but he's still behind the pack leaders."

== Track listing ==
The Way Forward track listing
| No. | Title | Writer(s) | Length |
|---|---|---|---|
| 1. | "Touch and Go" | Aaron Marshall | 4:21 |
| 2. | "Impulsively Responsible" | Marshall | 3:53 |
| 3. | "A Different Light" | Marshall | 4:35 |
| 4. | "By Far and Away" | Marshall; Owane | 4:08 |
| 5. | "Belvedere" | Marshall | 5:24 |
| 6. | "Rubicon Artist" | Marshall; Cameron McLellan | 4:39 |
| 7. | "The Waterfront" | Marshall | 4:43 |
| 8. | "Leave No Stone" | Marshall | 5:30 |
| Total length: | | | 37:17 |

== Personnel ==
Intervals

- Aaron Marshall – guitars, production

Additional musicians

- Nathan Bulla – drums, percussion
- Owane – keyboards, sound design

Additional personnel

- Cameron McLellan – production, engineering, bass
- Simon Grove – co-production, mixing
- Phil Hotz – engineering, music assistance
- Ermin Hamidovic – mastering
- Tim Grove – artwork, design concept
