= Circadian (Intervals album) =

Studio album by Intervals
- Released: November 13, 2020
- Length: 35:32
- Label: Self-released
- Producers: Aaron Marshall; Sam Guaiana

Intervals chronology
The Way Forward (2017)	Circadian (2020)	Memory Palace (2024)

Singles from Circadian
- 1. "5-HTP" Released: September 25, 2020; 2. "Lock & Key" Released: October 16, 2020; 3. "String Theory" Released: November 6, 2020

Circadian is the fourth studio album by Canadian instrumental progressive metal band Intervals. The album was self-released on November 13, 2020. It was produced by Aaron Marshall and Sam Guaiana.

== Critical reception ==
Professional ratings
Review scores
Source	Rating
Distorted Sound	9/10
Exclaim!	6/10
Metal Noise	Positive
ProgRocks	6/10
Ultimate Guitar	9/10

The album received generally positive reviews from music critics. Distorted Sound scored the album 9 out of 10 and said, "Perhaps most impressively, Circadian never falls into the trap many guitar-driven instrumentals are prone to – overemphasis on technicality without purpose, outweighing what's enjoyable to listen to. On the contrary, even as Marshall ups the complexity of guitar parts, it never becomes a challenge to listen to Circadian. The intricacy of the music only exists to benefit the overall flow of the whole record, and Circadian's sub-40-minute running time passes by like a cool breeze. With it, Intervals further cement themselves as one of the heavy scene's most masterful and creative instrumental artists." Anthony Boire of Exclaim! gave it 6 out of 10 and said, "This is music meant to inspire, and Marshall intends it as such. However, the unending assault of nitro-fuelled guitar runs and booming djent sections don't leave enough room to reflect on any of the more gorgeous melodies that blister by."

Giannis Voulgaris from ProgRocks gave the album 6 out of 10 and said, "In his fourth album, Marshall presents a more superficial version of himself, which does not suit him very much. His great asset is his amazing technique and the special melodies that this technique allows him to play. But by playing more direct music, he automatically loses the different thing that you expect from him. Because Circadian lacks in 'adventure' (or progressiveness if you prefer), I think it is addressed to a minimal audience, i.e. guitar lovers, and this underestimates Intervals, because they have shown that they can escape the narrow confines of guitar music. In my opinion, it's not a throwback, but it does not stand on the same level as the rest of their discography." Ultimate Guitar rated the album 9 out of 10 and stated, "Aaron displays a huge amount of talent, technical ability, but also taste, and a tendency toward crafting great, catchy melodies, and if you're into instrumental guitar music, you'll definitely want to give Circadian a listen."

== Track listing ==
Circadian track listing
No.	Title	Length
1.	"5-HTP"	3:01
2.	"Vantablack"	5:03
3.	"Luna[r]tic"	4:09
4.	"Lock & Key" (featuring Joshua De La Victoria)	4:56
5.	"Signal Hill"	3:33
6.	"String Theory" (featuring Marco Sfogli)	4:56
7.	"D.O.S.E." (featuring Saxl Rose)	4:26
8.	"Earthing"	5:26
Total length:		35:32

== Personnel ==
Intervals

- Aaron Marshall – guitars, co-production

Additional musicians

- Jacob Umansky – bass
- Nathan Bulla – drums, percussion
- Joshua De La Victoria – guest guitar on track 4
- Marco Sfogli – guest guitar on track 6
- Antonio "Saxl Rose" Hancock – guest saxophone on track 7

Additional personnel

- Sam Guaiana – co-production, engineering, mixing
- Dean Hadji-Christou – drum engineering
- Ermin Hamidovic – mastering
- Milen Petzelt-Sorace and Sergei Kofman – sound design
- Corey Meyers – layout, design
- Colin Frangicetto – painting, design concept
