= Nick Johnston (guitarist) =

Canadian guitarist (born 1987)

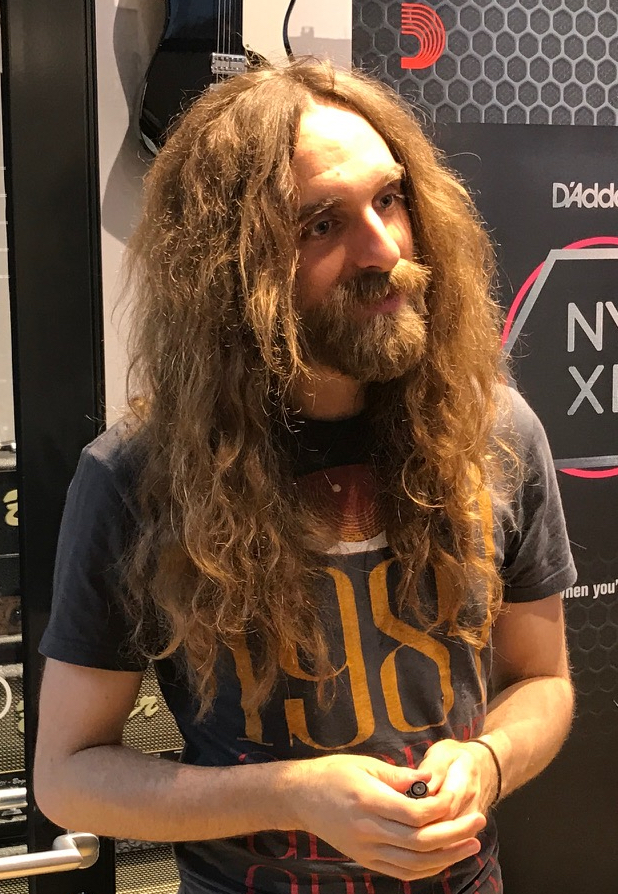
- Johnston in 2017

Background information
- Born: June 18, 1987 (age 39); Rockwood, Ontario, Canada
- Genre: Instrumental rock
- Occupations: Musician; songwriter
- Instrument: Guitar
- Years active: 2011–present
- Member of: Archival; Mastodon
- Website: nickjohnstonmusic.com

Nick Johnston is a Canadian guitarist and songwriter who records as a solo artist. As of 2024, he has released six solo records. His albums have featured the work of notable artists such as Paul Gilbert, Marco Minnemann, Guthrie Govan, and Bryan Beller. He has also played on songs by other artists, including Intervals, Scale the Summit, Periphery, Polyphia, and Mike Dawes, and he has toured with Plini, among other artists. In May 2019, he went on a North American tour with Between the Buried and Me and the Contortionist. In 2025, he was announced as a touring guitarist for the metal band Mastodon, and in 2026, he became a full member.

Johnston has cited musical influences such as Stevie Ray Vaughan, Eddie Van Halen, Yngwie Malmsteen, and Jeff Beck, saying "I sound nothing like those guys, but I'm massively influenced by them". Another influence was Joe Satriani. "Before listening to Joe, I don't think I understood how important a role the melodies played in building compositions", Nick stated in a Total Guitar interview. "I realised he was the guy who'd really figured it out—the balance of technique, tone, melody, and production. While players were learning blues from Hendrix and Clapton, I was learning them from Satriani".

The guitarist released his own signature guitar through Schecter in 2016. Schecter has since released additional variants of his signature guitar, splitting them into the USA Signature Series and Traditional Series, with these being premium and affordable versions respectively. He is also passionate about comics and has hired comics illustrators to create his album art.

== Discography ==
Nick Johnston discography
- Studio albums: 6
- Singles: 7
- Music videos: 20
- Featured artist: 2
- Other appearances: 9

=== Solo ===
==== Albums ====
Title	Album details
Public Display of Infection	Released: November 15, 2011; Label: Self-released; Format: CD, digital download
In a Locked Room on the Moon	Released: August 13, 2013; Label: Self-released; Format: CD, digital download
Atomic Mind	Released: October 7, 2014; Label: Self-released; Format: CD, digital download
Remarkably Human	Released: September 27, 2016; Label: Self-released; Format: CD, digital download, streaming
Wide Eyes in the Dark	Released: April 19,. 2019; Label: Self-released; Format: CD, digital download, streaming
Young Language	Released: November 26, 2021; Label: Remarkably Human; Format: CD, digital download, streaming
Child of Bliss	Release: March 8, 2024; Label: Remarkably Human; Format: CD, digital download, streaming

==== Singles ====
===== As lead artist =====
Title	Year	Album
"Silver Tongued Devil" (featuring Guthrie Govan)	2014	Atomic Mind
"Gemini"	2019	Wide Eyes in the Dark
"A Cure Promised"	2019	
"Young Language"	2021	Your Language
"Silver Moon Rising"	2021	Your Language
"Child of Bliss"	2024	Child of Bliss
"Moonflower"	2024	Child of Bliss

===== As featured artist =====
Title	Year	Album
"Slow Dancing in a Burning Room" (Mike Dawes featuring Nick Johnston)	2017	Era
"This Is Living" (Afterwake featuring Nick Johnston)	2017	TIL (Note: TIL is the name of a three-song single.)
"Krytonite" (John Connearn featuring Nick Johnston)	2024	Non-album singles
"Diving into the Unmapped" (Juanpa featuring Nick Johnston)	2024	Non-album singles

=== with Archival ===
Title	Album details
Fear and Fate	Released: April 23, 2021; Label: Remarkably Human; Format: Digital download, streaming
Your Kingdom	Released: November 18, 2022; Label: Self-released; Format: Digital download, streaming

=== with Osmanthus ===
Albums

Title	Year
"Diamond Tragedy"	2024

Singles

Title	Year
"Becoming"	2022
"My Heart is Slowly Burning Down"	2022
"Diamond Tragedy"	2023
"All the Things"	2023
"Oceans Rise"	2023

=== with Harrison / Johnston ===
Title	Year
Early Mercy	2025

=== with Mastodon ===
Albums

Title	Year
Marrow Deep	2026

Singles

Title	Year
"Your Ghost Again"	2026
"Snakes for Dinner"	2026

=== Music videos ===
Title	Year	Album
"Sandmonster"	2013	In a Locked Room on the Moon
"In a Locked Room on the Moon"	2013	In a Locked Room on the Moon
"Even If It Takes a Lifetime"	2014	In a Locked Room on the Moon
"Silver Tongued Devil" (featuring Guthrie Govan)	2014	Atomic Mind
"Ghosts of the Robot Graveyard"	2014	Atomic Mind
"Atomic Mind"	2015	Atomic Mind
"Ultra Force"	2015	Atomic Mind
"Remarkably Human"	2016	Remarkably Human
"Hypergiant"	2016	Remarkably Human
"Impossible Things" (featuring Gavin Harrison, Bryan Beller, and Luke Martin)	2016	Remarkably Human
"Fear Had Him by the Throat"	2016	Remarkably Human
"Weakened by Winter"	2017	Remarkably Human
"A Sick and Injured Brain"	2017	Remarkably Human
"Gemnini"	2019	Wide Eyes in the Dark
"A Cure Promised"	2019	Wide Eyes in the Dark
"Wide Eyes in the Dark"	2020	Wide Eyes in the Dark
"Silver Moon Rising"	2021	Your Language
"Strange Silent Places"	2022	Your Language
"Child of Bliss"	2024	Child of Bliss
"Moonflower"	2024	Child of Bliss

=== Other appearances ===
Title	Year	Credited artist(s)	Album
"The Parade of Ashes"	2014	Periphery	Clear
"Champagne"	2014	Polyphia	Muse
"Disorder"	2015	David Maxim Micic	Ego
"Slight of Hand"	2015	Intervals	The Shape of Colour
"Goddess Gate"	2017	Scale the Summit	In a World of Fear
"Sleep Walker"	2017	Technopath (featuring Tristan Fitchat and Nick Johnston)	Ontology
"Ache"	2017	Organized Chaos	Divulgence
"Ghost Town"	2019	Zac Tiessen (featuring Nick Johnston)	Non-album single
"Pythoness"	2019	Keith Merrow	Reading the Bones
