= Next to None =

American heavy metal band

- Origin: Lehigh Valley, Pennsylvania, United States
- Genres: Progressive metal
- Years active: 2013–present
- Label: Inside Out
- Spinoffs: Tallah
- Members: Thomas Cuce; Derrick Schneider; Kris Rank; Max Portnoy
- Past members: Ryland Holland

Next to None is an American progressive metal band formed in 2013 in the Lehigh Valley area of Pennsylvania by a group of teenagers. They toured the United States with Metal Allegiance and the United Kingdom with Haken and have released two studio albums, the most recent in 2017.

== History ==
Drummer Max Portnoy and bassist Kris Rank are childhood friends and used to jam together when Kris was focused on guitar. Guitarist Ryland Holland also participated, having met both in Spanish lessons they were taking at that time. They later met Thomas Cuce (vocals/keyboards), with whom Portnoy started writing music as early as 2011 or 2012, when they also recorded an EP, and the band was officially founded in March 2013, when Portnoy was 12 years old, and named Next to None after several different suggestions that were already taken. Soon, they were supporting Portnoy's father Mike Portnoy's then band Adrenaline Mob in a few shows in the United States.

In 2014, they recorded an EP with three songs, including "Fortune Cookie", which received a video featuring Dee Snider, Chris Jericho, Anthrax and hosts of That Metal Show.

In April 2015, the group released the song "You Are Not Me" and announced their first album, A Light in the Dark, released later that year (on June 29) via Inside Out and produced by Mike Portnoy. It featured guest performances by guitarist Ron "Bumblefoot" Thal (ex-Guns N' Roses) on "A Lonely Walk" and keyboardist Neal Morse (Transatlantic, Flying Colors) on the mellotron. Six of the album tracks form a concept about a man with a mental illness and dissociative identity disorder who eventually gives in to the voice in his head persuading him to commit crimes, with the title "A Light in the Dark" alluding to the reward he believes he will get from the bad things he's doing.

Holland eventually left the band to go to college and was replaced by Derrick Schneider, introduced to them by Bumblefoot. With Schneider, they recorded and released in 2017 their second album Phases, which began to be written right after the release of their debut. Phases was mostly self-produced at Cuce's home studio, with drums being recorded at Neal Morse's Radiant Studios with the assistance of engineer Jerry Guidroz. It was announced in May 2017 for a July 7 release. On June 23, the song "Pause" was premiered at Loudwire.

== Musical style and influences ==
Next to None is usually described as a progressive metal act. Portnoy cites Slipknot, Lamb of God, Metallica, Mudvayne, System of a Down and Korn as his influences, and says Cuce likes metalcore a lot. He also cites progressive influences on the band's sound, such as Tool, Dream Theater, Haken and Pain of Salvation. Mike Portnoy described their first album as "Slipknot meets Dream Theater".

When asked about influences on their second album Phases, Portnoy and Cuce mentioned System of a Down, Babymetal, Dream Theater, Periphery, Born of Osiris and Slipknot's .5: The Gray Chapter.

== Members ==
=== Current members ===
- Thomas Cuce – vocals, keyboards
- Derrick Schneider – guitars
- Kris Rank – bass
- Max Portnoy – drums

=== Former members ===
- Ryland Holland – guitars

== Discography ==
=== Studio albums ===
- A Light in the Dark (2015)
- Phases (2017)
