= Chris Letchford =

American guitarist and teacher

- Born: October 7, 1984 (age 41); Houston, Texas, U.S.
- Genres: Progressive metal; djent; instrumental rock
- Occupations: Musician; music teacher
- Instrument: Guitar
- Years active: 1992–present
- Labels: Prosthetic
- Member of: Scale the Summit
- Website: chrisletchford.com

Chris Letchford (born October 7, 1984) is an American guitarist. He is the lead guitarist in the instrumental progressive metal band Scale the Summit. His technical ability has been recognized in magazines such as Guitar World, Revolver, and All Metal Resource.

== Background ==
Letchford began playing guitar when he was 8 years old. He had over 6 years of private guitar lessons before applying to the Musicians Institute in Los Angeles, majoring in the Guitar Craft program and then the Guitar Performance program, GIT. Along with this education, he also attended Berklee College of Music with a major in music.

While at the Musicians Institute, he formed Scale the Summit with his friend and fellow guitarist Travis Levrier, and drummer Pat Skeffington, whom they met there in 2004. They added bass guitarist Jordan Eberhardt to complete the line-up.

== Equipment ==
Letchford endorses several guitar and amplifier companies. In late 2016 Chris has collaborated with Kiesel Guitars and came out with his first Kiesel signature model the CL6/7/8, a headless guitar with a fender strat sort of body, using Seymour Duncan Sentient, Nazgul pick ups. For recording and playing live, he uses his custom Matt Artinger 7 string, as well as guitars he makes himself. He also plays a headless 7-string guitar with fanned frets, which was made for him by the Swedish company Strandberg Guitarworks, and currently has a signature Strandberg Boden CL7, which is built in partnership with Washburn Guitars' USA Custom Shop. His main amp was an Axe Fx Ultra until he upgraded to the Axe Fx II, through Mackie HD1221 wedges, Ernie Ball volume pedal, Ernie Ball strings, InTune Guitar Picks. As of their most recent 2013 tours he was seen with a Mesa Boogie Cabinet, Carvin Pre Amp, Axe FX II, Ernie Ball Volume Pedal and Mission Expression Pedal. Chris also uses EMG pickups, 57-7 and 66-7. Chris also uses Dunlop Strings (10-56), Dunlop Signature Chris Letchford Jazz III Picks (1 mm) and sometimes he uses Seymour Duncan Pegasus/Sentient pickup set in some of his newer guitars. According to an interview he did with Gear Gods in 2016 he has switched from the AxFX II and has moved to the Line 6 Helix.

== Personal life ==
Letchford identifies as a dog person and owned a brindle Great Dane in 2010; he later stated he had two Great Danes. Letchford announced in June 2014 via Facebook that he was engaged to his girlfriend of 9 years, author Mariana Zapata.

== Discography ==
=== With Scale the Summit ===
- Monument (2007)
- Carving Desert Canyons (2009)
- The Collective (2011)
- The Migration (2013)
- V (2015)
- In a World of Fear (2017)
- Subjects (2021)

=== With islnds ===
- History of Robots (2016)

=== Solo career ===
- Lightbox (2014)
