= Subjects (album) =

Studio album by Scale the Summit
- Released: June 25, 2021
- Genre: Progressive metal; djent
- Length: 40:30
- Label: Self-released
- Producer: Chris Letchford

Scale the Summit chronology
In a World of Fear (2017)	Subjects (2021)

Singles from Subjects
- 1. "Jackhammer Ballet" Released: May 25, 2021; 2. "The Land of Nod" Released: June 3, 2021; 3. "Space Cadet" Released: June 15, 2021

Subjects is the seventh studio album by American instrumental progressive metal band Scale the Summit. The album was self-released on June 25, 2021, and was produced by the band's guitarist Chris Letchford. It is the band's first album that is not instrumental, featuring vocals performed by guest musicians. The album was elected by PopMatters as the 10th best progressive metal album of 2021.

== Track listing ==
No.	Title	Length
1.	"Form & Finite" (featuring Mike Semesky)	5:27
2.	"Don't Mind Me" (featuring Garrett Garfield)	4:53
3.	"Daggers & Cloak" (featuring Ross Jennings)	5:34
4.	"Dissemble" (featuring Eric Emery)	6:08
5.	"Jackhammer Ballet" (featuring Joseph Secchiaroli of The Reign of Kindo)	5:22
6.	"The Land of Nod" (featuring Courtney LaPlante)	3:57
7.	"A New Way" (featuring Renny Carroll)	4:05
8.	"Space Cadet" (featuring Eli Cutting)	5:00
Total length:		40:30

== Personnel ==
Scale the Summit

- Chris Letchford – guitars, production
- Kilian Duarte – bass
- Charlie Engen – drums

Additional musicians

- Mike Semesky – guest vocals on track 1
- Garrett Garfield – guest vocals on track 2
- Ross Jennings – guest vocals on track 3
- Eric Emery – guest vocals on track 4
- Joseph Secchiaroli of The Reign of Kindo – guest vocals on track 5
- Courtney LaPlante – guest vocals on track 6
- Renny Carroll – guest vocals on track 7
- Eli Cutting – guest vocals on track 8
