= Memory Palace (album) =

Studio album by Intervals
- Released: May 17, 2024
- Studio: Sweetwater Studios, Fort Wayne, Indiana, U.S.
- Length: 36:42
- Label: Self-released
- Producer: Aaron Marshall; Sam Guaiana

Intervals chronology
Circadian (2020)	Memory Palace (2024)

Singles from Memory Palace
- 1. "Mnemonic" Released: October 5, 2023; 2. "Neurogenesis" Released: March 7, 2024; 3. "Nootropic" Released: April 11, 2024; 4. "Circuit Bender" Released: May 9, 2024

Memory Palace is the fifth studio album by Canadian instrumental progressive metal band Intervals. The album was self-released on May 17, 2024. It was produced by Aaron Marshall and Sam Guaiana.

The album won the Juno Award for Instrumental Album of the Year at the Juno Awards of 2025.

== Track listing ==
Memory Palace track listing
No.	Title	Writer(s)	Length
1.	"Neurogenesis" (featuring KOAN Sound)	Aaron Marshall; Will Weeks; Jim Bastow	4:27
2.	"Mnemonic"	Marshall	4:49
3.	"Galaxy Brain" (featuring J3PO)	Marshall	4:20
4.	"Nootropic"	Marshall	5:04
5.	"Side Quest" (featuring Evan Marien)	Marshall; Evan Marien	3:41
6.	"Circuit Bender"	Marshall	4:49
7.	"Lacuna" (featuring OBLVYN)	Marshall; Catherine Bliemel	4:14
8.	"Chronophobia"	Marshall	5:18
Total length:			36:42

== Personnel ==
Intervals

- Aaron Marshall – guitars, co-production

Additional musicians

- Jacob Umansky – bass
- Nathan Bulla – drums, percussion
- KOAN Sound – guest synthesizers, sound design ("Neurogenesis")
- Julian Waterfall Pollack – guest piano ("Galaxy Brain")
- Evan Marien – guest bass ("Side Quest")
- OBLVYN – guest synthesizers ("Lacuna")

Additional personnel

- Sam Guaiana – co-production, engineering, mixing
- Mike Kalajian – mastering
- Jesse Zuretti – synths
- Mihailo Kalabic – artwork
