= A Voice Within =

Studio album by Intervals
- Released: March 4, 2014
- Recorded: November 2013
- Genres: Progressive metal; djent
- Length: 49:32
- Labels: Self-released; Basick
- Producers: Intervals; Cameron McLellan; Jordan Valeriote

Intervals chronology
In Time (2012)	A Voice Within (2014)	The Shape of Colour (2015)

Singles from A Voice Within
- 1. "Ephemeral" Released: December 30, 2013; 2. "The Escape" Released: January 21, 2014

A Voice Within is the debut studio album by Canadian instrumental progressive metal band Intervals. The album was self-released on March 4, 2014, in collaboration with Basick Records. It was self-produced by the band, Cameron McLellan and Jordan Valeriote. It is their first release with vocals and the only one with the singer Mike Semesky.

Professional ratings
Review scores
Source	Rating
Heavy Blog Is Heavy	4/5 stars
Louder Sound	3.5/5 stars

== Track listing ==
No.	Title	Length
1.	"Ephemeral"	5:04
2.	"Moment Marauder"	4:48
3.	"Automaton"	4:50
4.	"The Self Surrendered"	8:05
5.	"Breathe"	1:56
6.	"The Escape"	4:03
7.	"Atlas Hour"	7:09
8.	"Siren Sound"	5:05
9.	"A Voice Within"	8:29
Total length:		49:32

== Personnel ==
Credits adapted from Discogs.

Intervals

- Mike Semesky – vocals
- Aaron Marshall – guitars, bass, choir vocals (4), backing vocals (7)
- Lukas Guyader – guitars, backing vocals (1, 2, 3, 7), choir vocals (4), string arrangement (4)
- Anup Sastry – drums, percussion, choir vocals (4), backing vocals (7), additional engineering

Additional musicians

- Nils Mikkelsen – electric piano on track 2
- Ariel Loveland and Emily Rust – violin on track 4
- Michael Rollins – viola on track 4
- Sara Cerrato – cello on track 4
- Michael Ciccia and Matt HK – choir vocals on track 4

Additional personnel

- Jordan Valeriote – production, engineering, mixing
- Cameron McLellan – production, additional engineering, additional bass
- Intervals – production
- Randy Slaugh – string production on track 4
- Troy Glessner – mastering
- Ken Dudley and Scott Beseris – additional engineering
