= Monument (Scale the Summit album) =

Studio album by Scale the Summit
- Released: July 10, 2007
- Genre: Progressive metal; djent; instrumental rock
- Length: 38:19
- Label: Self-released
- Producer: Scale the Summit

Scale the Summit chronology
| Demo (2006) | Monument (2007) | Carving Desert Canyons (2009) |

Monument is the debut studio album by American instrumental progressive metal band Scale the Summit. It was self-released on July 10, 2007, and funded by the band members themselves. Chris Letchford described the songs as "a lot more up tempo and in my opinion less organized, due to the lack of writing experience," and the production process as "being sub-par in comparison to the band's standards owing to being self-funded."

Professional ratings
Review scores
| Source | Rating |
|---|---|
| Antimusic.com | 3/5 stars |
| Brutalism.com | (mixed) |
| Metalreview.com | (5/6) |

== Track listing ==
| No. | Title | Length |
|---|---|---|
| 1. | "Shaping the Clouds" | 4:55 |
| 2. | "Wolves" | 4:49 |
| 3. | "Crossing the Ocean" | 5:03 |
| 4. | "Omni" | 5:12 |
| 5. | "Rode in on Horseback" | 3:18 |
| 6. | "Roof of the World" | 5:02 |
| 7. | "Penguins in Flight" | 3:11 |
| 8. | "Holding Thunder" | 6:46 |
| Total length: | | 38:19 |

== Personnel ==
Scale the Summit

- Chris Letchford – lead guitar
- Travis Levrier – rhythm guitar
- Jordan Eberhardt – bass
- Pat Skeffington – drums

Additional personnel

- Scale the Summit – production
