= Carving Desert Canyons =

Studio album by Scale the Summit
- Released: February 17, 2009
- Studio: Nuthouse Recording, Hoboken, New Jersey
- Genre: Progressive metal; djent; instrumental rock
- Length: 38:19
- Label: Prosthetic
- Producer: Scale the Summit; Tom Beaujour

Scale the Summit chronology
Monument (2007)	Carving Desert Canyons (2009)	The Collective (2011)

Carving Desert Canyons is the second studio album by American instrumental progressive metal band Scale the Summit. It was released on February 17, 2009, through Prosthetic Records. The album was self-produced by the band and Tom Beaujour. It is the band's first studio release with the label. The cover art of this album is taken from The Wave, a sandstone rock formation in Arizona. The album's cover art was taken by a local Houston photographer, who sent them his portfolio of pictures to choose from; the eventual cover art was the first photograph Chris Letchford saw in the portfolio.

By contrast to their first album, Letchford described Carving Desert Canyons as "a lot more organized than their debut, in addition to being better produced as it was funded by an actual record label."

== Critical reception ==
Professional ratings
Review scores
Source	Rating
AllMusic	3.5/5 stars
Exclaim!	Favorable
Metal Underground	3.5/5 stars
ThePRP	3/5 stars
Sea of Tranquility	4.5/5 stars
Sputnikmusic	4/5 stars

The album received mixed, but usually positive reviews from critics. Eduardo Rivadavia of AllMusic assigned a rating of 3.5 stars out of 5, and said that the group were inventive but that the album's lack of "the convenient handholds normally afforded by lyrics and vocals" would eventually bore listeners not accustomed to their style. Sputnikmusic gave the album an "excellent" 4.0 out of 5, and remarked that Carving Desert Canyons demonstrated a maturation and refinement of the band's musical style compared to the overly-technical Monument, their debut. Exclaim! writer Chris Ayers compared the material to artists such as Rush, Yes and Cynic, saying that the album would "ensure the band a high position on this year's best-of lists." ThePRP rated the album 3 stars out of 5 and criticized the songs for belying the band members' true technical abilities, saying the songs sounded little better than customers playing at Guitar Center, and the production for being dynamically flat.

== Track listing ==
No.	Title	Length
1.	"Bloom"	2:09
2.	"Sargasso Sea"	5:14
3.	"The Great Plains"	5:11
4.	"Dunes"	4:27
5.	"Age of the Tide"	5:35
6.	"Glacial Planet"	4:52
7.	"City in the Sky"	5:03
8.	"Giants"	7:20
Total length:		39:55

== Personnel ==
Credits adapted from Discogs.

Scale the Summit

- Chris Letchford – lead guitar
- Travis Levrier – rhythm guitar
- Jordan Eberhardt – bass
- Pat Skeffington – drums

Additional personnel

- Tom Beaujour – production, engineering, mixing, recording
- Scale the Summit – production
- Kim Rosen – mastering
- Christopher Pierce – drum programming
- Alex Smolinski – editing
- Steven R. Gilmore – photography
