= The Collective (Scale the Summit album) =

Studio album by Scale the Summit
- Released: March 1, 2011
- Recorded: October 2010
- Studio: Audiohammer Studios, Sanford, Florida; Starlight Studies, Casselberry, Florida
- Length: 45:41
- Label: Prosthetic
- Producer: Mark Lewis

Scale the Summit chronology
Carving Desert Canyons (2009)	The Collective (2011)	The Migration (2013)

Singles from The Collective
- 1. "Whales" Released: February 3, 2011; 2. "Gallows" Released: February 14, 2021

The Collective is the third studio album by American instrumental progressive metal band Scale the Summit. It was released on March 1, 2011, through Prosthetic Records and was produced Mark Lewis. It is the band's first studio release with the label. The title for this album was chosen to reflect the philosophy that guided the writing of the material – of many parts coming together to form a greater whole. The album's cover features a phyllotaxis spiral, a natural formation occurring in some plants, which Chris Letchford described as "a multitude of elements forming their own collective – and the inspiration for the album's title, as the band very often take inspiration from nature." It is the last release to feature original bassist Jordan Eberhardt, who left the band in early 2012 after no longer wishing to tour full-time. He was replaced by Mark Michell.

A vinyl edition containing the bonus track "Redwoods" and limited to 250 copies was released in February 2012. The song was also released as a single.

== Background and recording ==
On October 4, 2010, Scale the Summit begun recording the new album. On October 25, the band have wrapped up tracking their new album and awaiting mixes for the effort with plans for a release early next year. On January 19, 2011, they officially announced the album itself and release date. On January 25, the band have begun a new webisode series looking at the making of the album, whilst also revealing the album cover and the track list. On February 9, they have made the second studio webisode for the album available for viewing over at Guitar World.

== Critical reception ==
Professional ratings
Review scores
Source	Rating
AllMusic	4/5 stars
Blabbermouth.net	8/10
KillYourStereo	5/5 stars
Lambgoat	6/10
Sputnikmusic	5/5 stars
Ultimate Guitar	8.7/10

Phil Freeman wrote for AllMusic to compliment the group for opting to write songs with actual expression and not merely showing their technical talent off; he described The Collective as "a cohesive aesthetic experience, meant to be heard from beginning to end", and rated it 4 stars out of 5. At Ultimate Guitar, the staff praised the album, describing the group as part of "the next generation of Vais and Satrianis", and noting that the group often use "mellower" material on the album instead of instrumental heavy metal at all times. Sputnikmusic Thompson D. Gerhart rated The Collective an "excellent" 5.0 out of 5, and said that despite the lack of musical evolution between this album and the previous one, it was still their best yet. Blabbermouth.net applauded The Collective as what reviewer Scott Alisoglu described as "an instrumental album every bit as musically engrossing and melodically enchanting as one with vocals", as he stated that Scale the Summit's "performances are [not] over the top in a technical sense" because the members of the group come together to "[create] a whole that is greater than the sum of those four parts". He closed his review by saying that although the band had not "reinvented the instrumental form", they have made an album thereof with greater coherency than is typical of the genre.

== Track listing ==
No.	Title	Length
1.	"Colossal"	3:48
2.	"Whales"	6:28
3.	"Emersion"	2:33
4.	"The Levitated"	3:02
5.	"Secret Earth"	3:38
6.	"Gallows"	4:33
7.	"Origin of Species"	2:45
8.	"Alpenglow"	3:58
9.	"Black Hills"	7:59
10.	"Balkan"	3:44
11.	"Drifting Figures"	3:10
Total length:		45:41

== Personnel ==
Credits adapted from AllMusic.

Scale the Summit

- Chris Letchford – lead guitar
- Travis Levrier – rhythm guitar
- Jordan Eberhardt – bass
- Pat Skeffington – drums

Additional personnel

- Mark Lewis – production, engineering, mixing, recording
- Alan Douches – mastering
- David Aron Hopper – art direction, design
- Steven R. Gilmore – photography

== Charts ==
Chart (2011)	Peak position
US Heatseekers Albums (Billboard)	39
