= The Migration =

Studio album by Scale the Summit
- Released: June 11, 2013
- Recorded: January 2013
- Studios: Basement Studios, Winston-Salem, North Carolina
- Genres: Progressive metal; djent; instrumental rock
- Length: 42:09
- Label: Prosthetic
- Producers: Scale the Summit; Jamie King

Scale the Summit chronology
The Collective (2011)	The Migration (2013)	V (2015)

Singles from The Migration
- 1. "Odyssey" Released: April 15, 2013; 2. "Atlas Novus" Released: May 22, 2013; 3. "Oracle" Released: June 3, 2013; 4. "Narrow Salient" Released: June 4, 2013; 5. "The Olive Tree" Released: June 7, 2013; 6. "The Traveler" Released: June 7, 2013

The Migration is the fourth studio album by American instrumental progressive metal band Scale the Summit. It was released on June 11, 2013, through Prosthetic Records. The album was self-produced by the band and Jamie King. The album's artwork for The Migration was created by Duncan Storr. Chris Letchford stated the band wanted artwork that "fit the usual organic/nature theme that we are costumed [sic] to using with more of the color green," adding that he also admired the album covers of progressive rock band Yes. The album's sound was intended to be "organic and natural", and Letchford praised producer Jamie King for being in complete agreement with and understanding the group's goals. Guitars were recorded to a click track first, followed by drums and then bass. The mixing process was accomplished via email; King would send the group one entire mix of the album and the group would send him feedback in response. This was done five times before the album was considered finished.

This is the band's first album with Mark Michell on bass. Michell wrote the ending of "Oracle" and all of "Evergreen", which is a bass solo (Letchford noted that the higher-pitched sounds mistaken for regular guitars are actually all notes performed on the bass). It is also their last album with original drummer Pat Skeffington, who was replaced by J.C. Bryant after this album was released. At the time it was written, the band considered "The Traveler" to be their most difficult song yet.

== Background and recording ==
On June 14, 2012, Scale the Summit announced that they are working on new material for the forthcoming album. On October 25, the band begun working on the new album. On November 12, they revealed the title of the album. On December 20, Scale the Summit have issued another video update from the writing process for the album. The band are due to enter Basement Studios in Winston-Salem, North Carolina to begin recording the effort on January 2, 2013. On January 22, 2013, the band announced that recording sessions have wrapped for the album.

== Promotion and release ==
On March 20, 2013, studio footage from Scale the Summit's album has been posted online below courtesy of Guitar World. On March 27, the album has been given a release date on June 11. Along with the date comes the following second batch of studio footage from the albums sessions through Guitar Messenger. On April 3, the album's track list has been revealed. Along with the track list comes new studio footage of the band's latest bassist, Mark Michell. On April 10, the band unveiled the artwork for the album. Along with the artwork comes the final studio webisode for the album which focuses on drummer Pat Skeffington.

== Critical reception ==
Professional ratings
Aggregate scores
Source	Rating
Metacritic	84/100
Review scores
Source	Rating
AllMusic	4/5 stars
Blabbermouth.net	9/10
Exclaim!	8/10
KillYourStereo	4.5/5 stars
Metal Injection	8/10
Metal Storm	8.4/10
Sputnikmusic	4.2/5 stars
Ultimate Guitar	7.7/10

The album received generally positive reviews from critics. At Metacritic, which assigns a normalized rating out of 100 to reviews from mainstream critics, the album has an average score of 84 out of 100 based on 6 reviews, indicating "universal acclaim". Sputnikmusic reviewer Julianna Reed also enjoyed the record, and specifically cited the composition of the track "The Olive Tree" as evidence that the band "knows exactly what it's doing" on this album. Scoring the record 8 points out of 10, Exclaim!'s Trystan MacDonald praised the group for being able to "balance technical shredding and melodic atmospheric pieces", and thus create well-written songs that also display their instrumental prowess. At Ultimate Guitar, the staff felt that the band's best performances on the album were not their "fast-paced guitar-driven moments", citing "Atlas Novus" and "Olive Tree" as examples, but wrote that The Collective was a superior album and rated this one 7.7 out of 10.

== Commercial performance ==
Brave Words & Bloody Knuckles reported that the album's opening sales were four times those of The Collective.

== Track listing ==
No.	Title	Length
1.	"Odyssey"	5:12
2.	"Atlas Novus"	5:07
3.	"The Olive Tree"	5:07
4.	"Narrow Salient"	3:34
5.	"Oracle"	5:30
6.	"Evergreen"	1:41
7.	"The Dark Horse"	4:12
8.	"Willow"	5:06
9.	"Sabrosa"	0:31
10.	"The Traveler"	6:04
Total length:		42:09

== Personnel ==
Credits adapted from AllMusic.

Scale the Summit

- Chris Letchford – lead guitar, layout
- Travis Levrier – rhythm guitar
- Mark Michell – bass
- Pat Skeffington – drums

Additional personnel

- Jamie King – production, engineering, mixing, mastering, recording
- Scale the Summit – production
- Duncan Storr – artwork

== Charts ==
Chart (2013)	Peak position
US Billboard 200	131
US Top Rock Albums (Billboard)	41
US Top Hard Rock Albums (Billboard)	11
US Independent Albums (Billboard)	24
US Heatseekers Albums (Billboard)	3
