= Intervals (band) =

Canadian instrumental progressive metal band

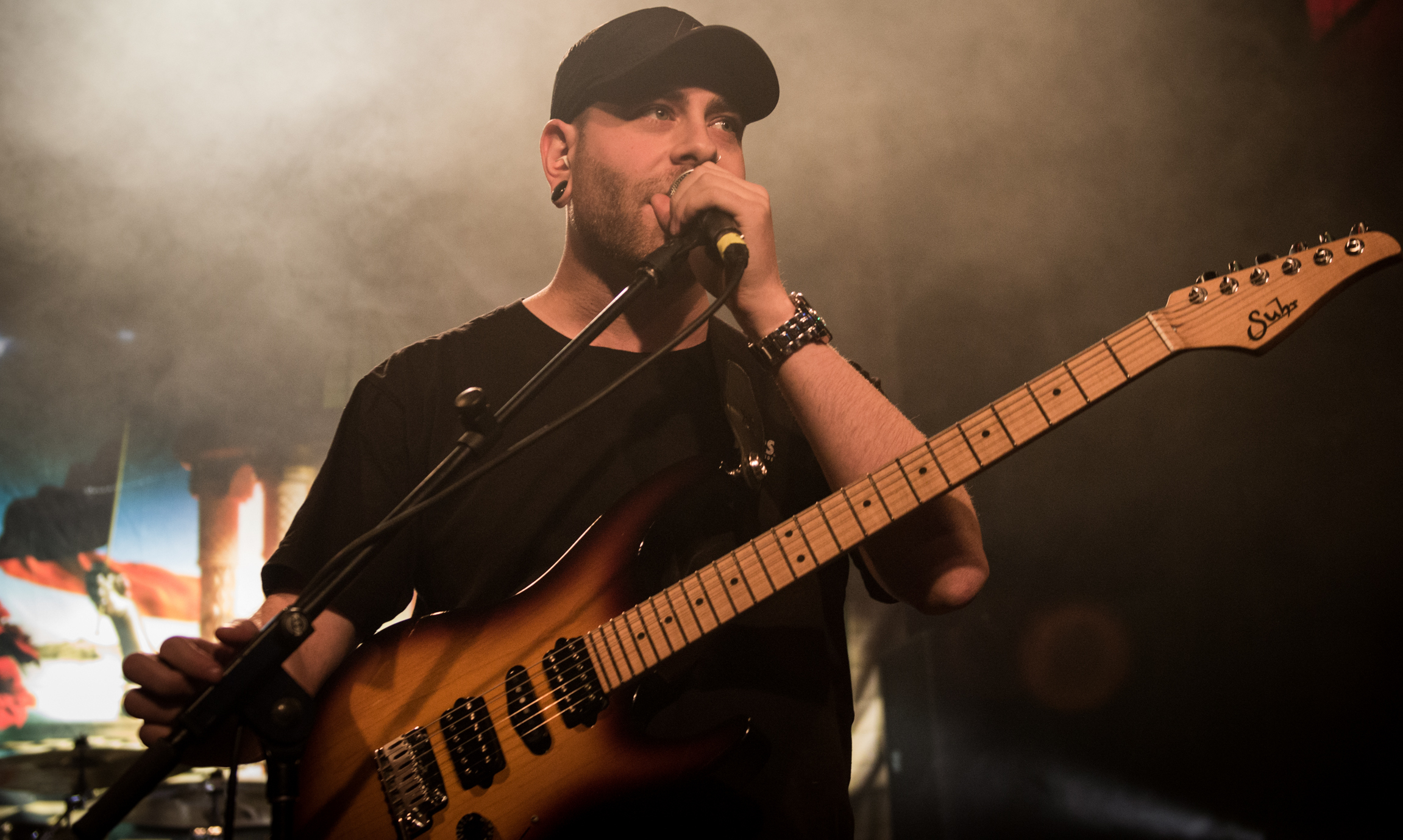
- Intervals performing in 2018

Background information
- Origin: Toronto, Ontario, Canada
- Genres: Progressive metal; progressive rock; djent; instrumental rock
- Years active: 2011–present
- Members: Aaron Marshall
- Past members: Matt De Luca; Mike Semesky; Lukas Guyader; Anup Sastry
- Website: intervalsmusic.net

Intervals is a Canadian instrumental progressive metal band formed in Toronto, Ontario, in 2011. The band has toured throughout Canada and the United States with bands such as Animals as Leaders, Protest the Hero, Between the Buried and Me, and The Contortionist.

Intervals released two EPs, The Space Between (2011) and In Time (2012), and their debut studio album A Voice Within on March 4, 2014, featuring vocals by Mike Semesky. After the exit of every band member except for guitarist Aaron Marshall, follow-up albums The Shape of Colour (2015), The Way Forward (2017), Circadian (2020), and Memory Palace (2024) were released.

== History ==
=== Formation and The Space Between EP (2011–2012) ===
Intervals was formed in Toronto, Ontario, in 2011 as a creative outlet for guitarist Aaron Marshall after quitting his previous band, Speak of the Devil. After releasing two songs online ("Still Winning" and "Duality"), Anup Sastry, Lukas Guyader, and Semesky joined the band. Their first EP The Space Between was recorded in Aaron's basement, with the exception of Sastry, who recorded his drums at his own home studio in Frederick, Maryland. The mixing and mastering were done by Adam "Nolly" Getgood of Periphery, and it was released independently on December 20, 2011. At this point, the band attempted to find a vocalist to complete the line-up, but failed to do so.

=== In Time EP (2012–2013) ===
With the release of their second EP In Time on October 30, 2012, they were joined by Olly Steele (Monuments) and David Maxim Micic (Destiny Potato) as guest soloists. Sputnikmusic gave the EP a 4/5 rating, suggesting that "if they find a bit more creativity and increase their originality, they have potential to go down in history as one of the best instrumental prog metal bands. As of now, they are still not on the same level as Animals as Leaders". The band released a music video for "Epiphany" on April 25, 2013, through Guitar World promotion and YouTube. Following the success of In Time, the band gained endorsement deals from Ernie Ball, Music Man, Pearl Drums, Meinl Cymbals, Toontrack, InTune Guitar Picks, and Gruv Gear. Marshall and Sastry also released playthroughs, as well as lessons for select songs off the EP. On April 18, 2013, it was announced that Matt De Luca would be leaving the band to pursue other projects.

=== A Voice Within (2013–2015) ===
On September 14, 2013, Intervals announced they would again be entering the studio with producer Jordan Valeriote (Silverstein, Structures, Counterparts) on November 4 to begin tracking their upcoming release. Following the studio, Intervals were scheduled to tour Europe (January–February 2014) with Protest the Hero, TesseracT, and The Safety Fire. On December 30, it was announced that live bassist Mike Semesky would be changing his role in the band to provide vocals on the new album. The album's bass tracks were handled equally between Marshall and Cameron McLellan (Protest the Hero). The band released Semesky's vocal debut in the form of new single "Ephemeral" through Revolver, as well as a revelation that the new album would be titled A Voice Within.

Due to the need for Semesky to focus entirely on his vocal performance live, the band hired Henry Selva (formerly of The Human Abstract) as a live bassist for their upcoming European tour, but eventually opted to use the bass in the backing track moving forward.

"I'm extremely happy to announce that I am the singer of Intervals. I joined the band on bass in early 2013, but after writing and experimenting with vocals over demos of the band's new material, the four of us knew that that was the direction we were meant to go. I feel so blessed to be a part of such a talented group of musicians and I'm extremely proud of the album we all worked so hard on. We can't wait for you all to hear it!"

The band released a second song from the album, "The Escape", on January 23, 2014, and announced that the album would be released on March 4, 2014. On February 26, the band announced that they would be releasing one new song from the album per day until the day of the album's release. The first of these songs was "The Self Surrendered".

=== The Shape of Colour and The Way Forward (2015–2020) ===
On November 25, 2014, it was announced that Semesky parted ways with the band due to Marshall's desire to instrumentally front the band again. An instrumental version of A Voice Within was then released on March 3, 2015. On June 23, three months after, Guyader and Sastry finally announced on Facebook that they decided they would no longer be a part of Intervals without Semesky. According to Marshall's narrative, the separation was caused by different expectations as to the direction of the band. However, Sastry and Guyader have both cited that after removing Semesky, Marshall wanted to demote their roles strictly to "hired guns" in an effort to further rebrand the band as his solo project. After the moral loss of losing Semesky, there was a lack of communication for a few months. In that time, Marshall finished the solo record he had already been working on throughout the year. He then booked studio time and new musicians without the rest of the bands knowledge, only communicating all of this to them through an ultimatum days before the studio time was to begin. So Sastry and Guyader opted to leave together.

Marshall's new studio musicians were then revealed to be bassist Cameron McLellan and drummer Travis Orbin (Darkest Hour, Periphery, Sky Eats Airplane), for the next album. On December 4, 2015, Intervals released The Shape of Colour.

On October 24, 2017, Intervals announced The Way Forward, a new album with McLellan returning to bass, and new drummer Nathan Bulla, who had been playing live with the band until the release. Marshall continues to be the only official member of the band, despite having returning members for tours and studio recordings.

=== Circadian and Memory Palace (2020–present) ===
On November 13, 2020, the band released Circadian, which featured collaborations with a number of artists. The album also featured the return of 7-string arrangements for the first time since A Voice Within (2014).

In 2022, Intervals toured in support of Animals as Leaders for their album Parrhesia, and in 2023 Intervals supported Spiritbox for their first U.S. headlining tour alongside After the Burial.

On May 17, 2024, the band released their fifth studio album, Memory Palace. The album featured several collaborations from electronic artists. Intervals toured in support of Mammoth WVH for the second leg of their Mammoth II Tour 2024.

== Band members ==
Current

- Aaron Marshall – guitars (2011–present)

Current touring musicians

- Nathan Bulla – drums, percussion (2016–present)
- Jacob Umansky – bass (2017–present)
- Travis LeVrier – guitars (2019–present)

Former

- Matt De Luca – bass (2011–2013)
- Mike Semesky – vocals (2013–2014); bass (touring member 2013)
- Lukas Guyader – guitars (2011–2015)
- Anup Sastry – drums, percussion (2011–2015)

Former touring musicians

- Henry Selva – bass (2014)
- Plini – guitars (2016)
- Simon Grove – bass (2016–2017)
- Sam Jacobs – guitars (2016–2018)
- Thomas Griggs – guitars (2018–2019)

== Discography ==
Studio albums

Year	Title	Label	Chart peaks			
Year	Title	Label	US Sales	US Rock	US Indie	US Heatseekers
2014	A Voice Within	Independent	189	—	43	9
2015	The Shape of Colour	Independent	—	43	31	7
2017	The Way Forward	Independent	—	—	35	3
2020	Circadian	Independent	81	—	—	—
2024	Memory Palace	Independent	—	—	—	—

EPs

Year	Title
2011	The Space between
2012	In Time

Singles

Year	Title	Album
2013	"Epiphany"	A Voice Within
2013	"Ephemeral"	A Voice Within
2014	"The Escape"	A Voice Within
2015	"I'm Awake"	The Shape of Colour
2015	"Fable"	The Shape of Colour
2017	"Touch and Go"	The Way Forward
2017	"By Far and Away"	The Way Forward
2017	"Rubicon Artist"	The Way Forward
2020	"5-HTP"	Circadian
2020	"Lock & Key"	Circadian
2020	"String Theory"	Circadian
2023	"Mnemonic"	Memory Palace
2024	"Neurogenesis"	Memory Palace
2024	"Nootropic"	Memory Palace
2024	"Circuit Bender"	Memory Palace

As guest musician (credited as Intervals or Aaron Marshall)

- Lithium Dawn - Aion (2012), "Freefall"
- Auras - Panacea (2013), "Aporia"
- Polyphia - Inspire (2013), "Persevere"
- Polyphia - Muse (2014), "Sweet Tea"
- Sithu Aye - Pulse (2014), "Messenger"
- Wide Eyes - Samsara (2014), "Preta"
- Sithu Aye - Set Course For Andromeda (2016), "Transient Transistors"
- David Maxim Micic - Who Bit the Moon (2017), "Living Room"
- Shrezzers - Relationships (2018), "Neglect"
- Robb Cappelletto - (2019) "Babies and Bad People"
- Silverstein - A Beautiful Place to Drown (2020), "Bad Habits"
- Novelists - C'est La Vie (2020), "Human Condition"
- Evan Marien - Parallels (2020), "Kyoto"
- Evan Marien - Elysian (2023), "Hexalogic"
- The Home Team - The Crucible of Life (2024), "Love & Co"
- Kevin Sherwood, Malukah, Intervals - Call of Duty: Black Ops 6 - Zombies "Shattered Veil" (Original Soundtrack) (2025), "Falling To Pieces"
- PhaseOne, Intervals, Micah Martin - (2025), “Divide”
- Falchi - Solace (2026), “Sweetchasm, Pt. 1”
- Evan Marien, Intervals, Dana Hawkins - Chrono (2026), “Knights of the Round”

== Videography ==
- "Epiphany" (2013)
- "Moment Marauder" (2014)
- "The Escape" (2014)
- "Siren Sound" (2014)
- "I'm Awake" (2016)
- "Libra" (2017)
- "Touch and Go" (2019)
- "Leave No Stone" (2019)
- "Neurogenesis" (2024)
