= Scale the Summit =

American instrumental progressive metal band

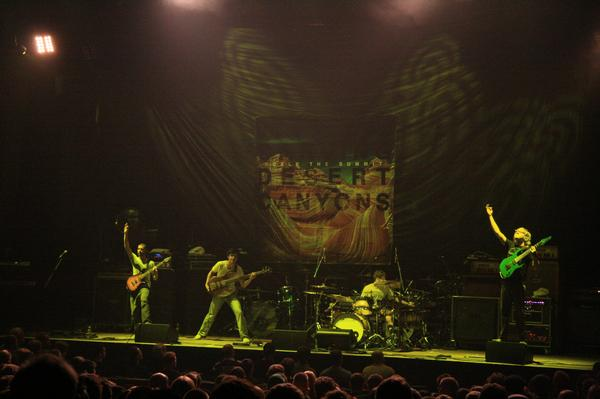
- From left to right: Travis Levrier, Jordan Eberhardt, Pat Skeffington, and Chris Letchford performing in 2009

Background information
- Origin: Houston, Texas, U.S.
- Genres: Progressive metal; djent; instrumental rock
- Years active: 2004–present
- Label: Prosthetic
- Members: Chris Letchford; Kilian Duarte; Charlie Engen
- Past members: Jordan Eberhardt; Pat Skeffington; Travis Levrier; Mark Michell; J.C. Bryant

Scale the Summit is an American instrumental progressive metal band formed in Houston, Texas in 2004. The band comprises guitarist Chris Letchford, bassist Kilian Duarte and drummer Charlie Engen. They were signed to Prosthetic Records before the band decided to release their work independently. The band is influenced by other progressive acts such as Cynic and Dream Theater. The band gained notice as part of the Progressive Nation 2009 tour with Dream Theater, Zappa Plays Zappa and Bigelf.

== History ==
=== Formation and early years (2004–2007) ===
Chris Letchford and Travis Levrier grew up in the same neighborhood, but never played music together until 2004, after they reconnected a few years earlier in a record store discussing a common interest, Between the Buried and Me. The duo formed a metal band in Houston that had trouble finding a bass guitarist and drummer. Letchford was set to attend the Los Angeles Musicians Institute a year after the band's formation, and Levrier decided to attend as well. The duo mainly hoped to meet new people to join their band, reasoning that their chances of doing so would be highest there, and after only a few months they met Jordan Eberhardt and Pat Skeffington, who joined on bass guitar and drums respectively. They first noticed Skeffington when they saw him wearing a Between the Buried and Me T-shirt with drumsticks protruding from his backpack, and Eberhardt joined in response to an ad the trio placed on Myspace. Reflecting on the experience, Letchford explained, "I still think to this day that it was just meant to be, as moving out to Los Angeles didn't guarantee anything. I think we all just crossed paths at the perfect time."

Although the band played typical progressive metal with a vocalist in Houston, Letchford and Levrier noted a change in their sound when they started writing again in Los Angeles. After writing their first song, "Rode In on Horseback", the duo realized the material sounded as if it was already complete, without being written for a singer, and so the duo dismissed the idea of finding another singer. The duo took two years of classes at the institute, where their new band recorded four songs on a demo and played shows around the town. To make it easier to pursue a career in the band, Letchford and Levrier convinced Eberhardt and Skeffington, whom they had never met before attending school, to move to Houston with them instead of basing the band in Los Angeles. Letchford later explained that despite enjoying the area's natural beauty he felt the music scene in Los Angeles was too crowded and difficult to survive in. The band's formation was temporarily threatened by Levrier finding work for a band called Into the Moat, which he considered joining permanently, but Letchford sent him a demo recording of the song "Omni" (a song that would appear on the band's debut album, Monument), and Levrier changed his mind. Into the Moat disbanded in spite of touring with acts such as Between the Buried and Me and The Black Dahlia Murder. Levrier coined the name "Scale the Summit" when he perused a photography book and saw a picture titled "The Summit", and mentioned the name as soon as it came to mind; the group took the name immediately.

=== Releases and success (2008–present) ===
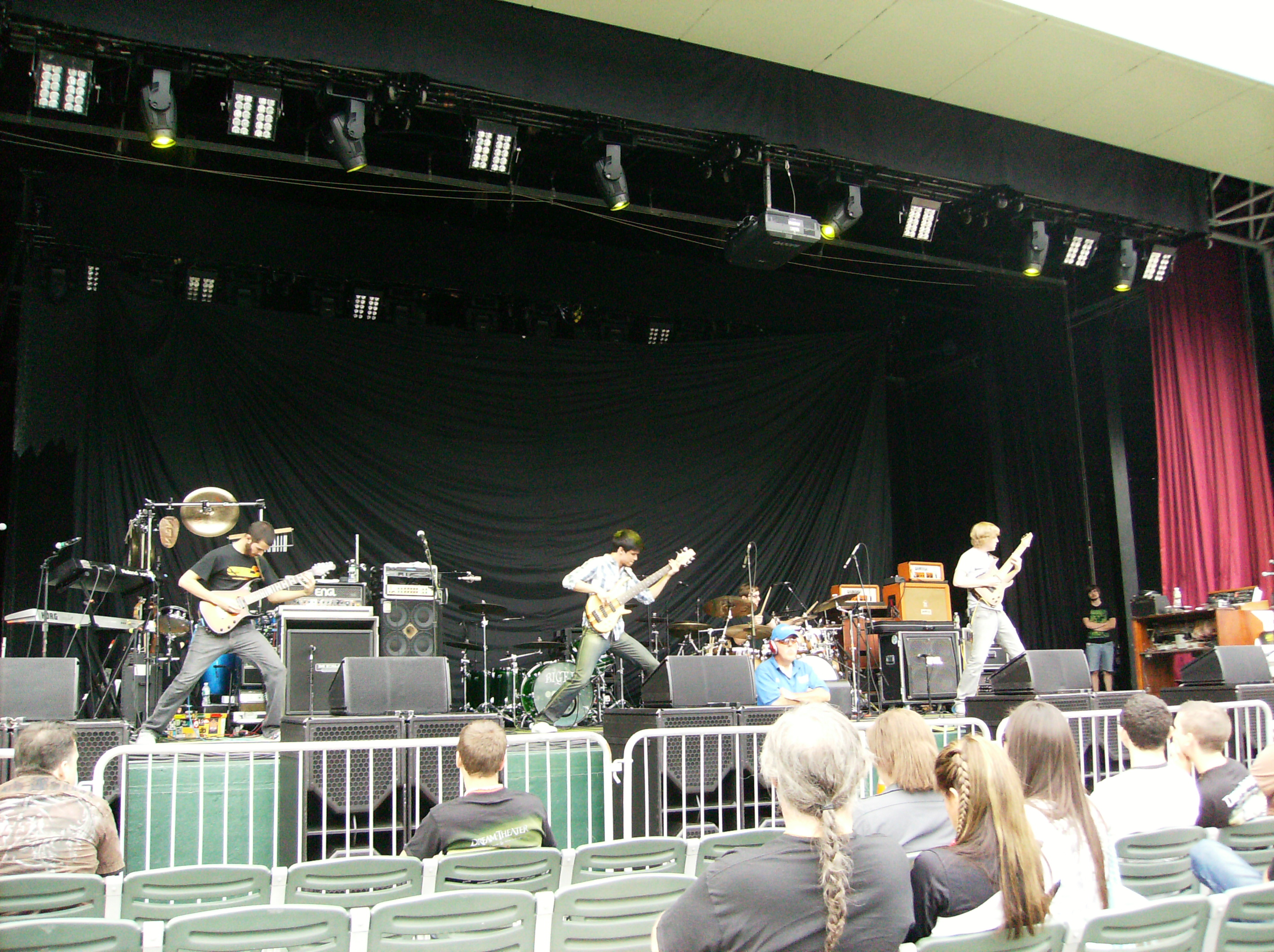
Scale the Summit in 2009

Scale the Summit's first release was a demo that they personally handed-out at shows in limited quantities, and their first album, Monument, was self-funded and self-released. Letchford was dismissive of the album's sound, which he considered inferior to those of the group's later albums as the group had had little experience in songwriting by that time and limited funds for the sessions. In 2009 they signed with Prosthetic Records and began working on their second album, Carving Desert Canyons. Mike Portnoy of Dream Theater heard the band's music and invited them to tour with Dream Theater on the 2009 ProgNation Tour.

In 2010, they toured North America in support of Between the Buried and Me and recorded their third album, The Collective, which they released the following year. Also in 2011, the band toured with Periphery and Fair to Midland, The Human Abstract, Cynic, 3, Protest the Hero, Last Chance to Reason, Volumes, Structures, Rings of Saturn, and The Contortionist.

In April 2012, Jordan Eberhardt left the band, citing his reluctance to continue touring full-time; he was replaced by Mark Michell.

In November 2012, Letchford announced that the band had started writing material for their fourth album, The Migration, which was released on June 11 the following year.

In March 2015, Pat Skeffington left the band and was replaced by J.C. Bryant, who wrote and recorded the drums for the band's fifth studio album, titled V and which was released on September 18, 2015.

In August 2016, Travis LeVrier announced that he would be leaving Scale the Summit to join Entheos as a full-time member.

On October 27, 2016, it was announced that drummer J.C. Bryant and bassist Mark Michell had left the band, with drummer Charlie Engen announced as a replacement for Bryant. On October 31, 2016, it was revealed that the split was due to Letchford's alleged refusal to pay band members. On December 20, Kilian Duarte was announced as the band's new bass player.

On May 19, 2017, Scale the Summit released their sixth studio album, In a World of Fear. Their seventh studio album, Subjects, was released on June 25, 2021. The album was elected by PopMatters as the 10th best progressive metal album of 2021.

== Musical style ==
Scale the Summit members thoroughly rehearse songs to record albums quickly, and seek to perform their songs live exactly as recorded. Letchford estimates that most of the material remains the same between pre-recording rehearsals and during recording, even though the group sometimes alters the songs as they go.

The band refer to their style of music "adventure metal", a term which Letchford states originated from how listeners on the Musician's Institute campus told him and Levrier that they felt the music was taking them on a journey as they listened. Before their first album, the band were often told they needed a vocalist, but Letchford stated the group has always been against the idea, even a guest vocalist. Lacking a vocalist enables the band to avoid the verse–chorus–verse songwriting strategy that most bands with singers need to use to accommodate the lyrics. Letchford feels that writing music to be complete without vocals is more difficult.

Song titles are usually selected after the songs are recorded by listening to the finished recording and brainstorming. The process for song title selection can be lengthy.

Due to rhythmical complexity ("off-time chugs"), the use of extended range guitars, and the general "vibe", their music is often ascribed to be djent despite much of their material being "clean channel" which contradicts the early onomatopoeic etymology of the genre's name.

== Band members ==
Current

- Chris Letchford – guitar (2004–present)
- Kilian Duarte – bass (2016–present)
- Charlie Engen – drums (2017–present)

Former

- Jordan Eberhardt – bass (2004–2012)
- Pat Skeffington – drums (2004–2015)
- Travis Levrier – rhythm guitar (2004–2016)
- Mark Michell – bass (2012–2016)
- J.C. Bryant – drums (2015–2016)

Timeline

== Discography ==
- Monument (2007)
- Carving Desert Canyons (2009)
- The Collective (2011)
- The Migration (2013)
- V (2015)
- In a World of Fear (2017)
- Subjects (2021)
