= Solid Gold Hits =

Greatest hits album by Beastie Boys
- Released: November 7, 2005
- Recorded: 1986–2004
- Genres: Alternative hip-hop; golden age hip-hop; rap rock
- Length: 52:53
- Label: Capitol
- Producers: Executive Producer Beastie Boys; Musical Producers Rick Rubin, Mario C, Fatboy Slim

Beastie Boys chronology
To the 5 Boroughs (2004)	Solid Gold Hits (2005)	The Mix-Up (2007)

Professional ratings
Review scores
Source	Rating
AllMusic	4/5 stars
Pitchfork Media	7.5/10
RapReviews	8/10
The Times	4/5 stars
Yahoo! Music	link

Solid Gold Hits is a greatest hits collection by Beastie Boys, released in November 2005. In contrast to 1999's The Sounds of Science double-CD anthology, Solid Gold Hits is one CD consisting of tracks that were released as singles, with the exception of "Shake Your Rump". A limited edition includes a DVD with the music videos for the same tracks. The Japanese release has a bonus song and video, "Right Right Now Now".

== Track listing ==
No.	Title	Writer(s)	Original album	Length
1.	"So What'cha Want"	A. Horovitz, M. Diamond, A. Yauch	Check Your Head	3:37
2.	"Brass Monkey"	A. Horovitz, M. Diamond, A. Yauch, R. Rubin	Licensed to Ill	2:39
3.	"Ch-Check It Out"	A. Horovitz, M. Diamond, A. Yauch	To the 5 Boroughs	3:11
4.	"No Sleep till Brooklyn"	A. Horovitz, M. Diamond, A. Yauch, R. Rubin	Licensed to Ill	4:06
5.	"Hey Ladies"	A. Horovitz, M. Diamond, A. Yauch, M. Dike, J. King, M. Simpson, R. Ford, B. Bishop, G. Shider, L. Shider	Paul's Boutique	3:49
6.	"Pass the Mic"	A. Horovitz, M. Diamond, A. Yauch, M. Caldato	Check Your Head	4:17
7.	"An Open Letter to NYC"	A. Horovitz, M. Diamond, A. Yauch, C. Chrome, J. Magnum, D. Thomas, J. Zero	To the 5 Boroughs	4:13
8.	"Root Down"	A. Horovitz, M. Diamond, A. Yauch	Ill Communication	3:32
9.	"Shake Your Rump"	A. Horovitz, M. Diamond, A. Yauch, M. Dike, J. King, M. Simpson	Paul's Boutique	3:18
10.	"Intergalactic"	A. Horovitz, M. Diamond, A. Yauch, M. Caldato	Hello Nasty	3:30
11.	"Sure Shot"	A. Horovitz, M. Diamond, A. Yauch, W. Fite, M. Caldato, J. Steig	Ill Communication	3:18
12.	"Body Movin'" (Fatboy Slim remix)	A. Horovitz, M. Diamond, A. Yauch, M. Caldato, T. Puente	Body Movin' single	4:09
13.	"Triple Trouble"	A. Horovitz, M. Diamond, A. Yauch, B. Edwards, N. Rodgers	To the 5 Boroughs	2:44
14.	"Sabotage"	A. Horovitz, M. Diamond, A. Yauch	Ill Communication	2:58
15.	"Fight for Your Right"	A. Horovitz, M. Diamond, A. Yauch, R. Rubin	Licensed to Ill	3:31
Total length:				52:53

Japanese Edition bonus track
No.	Title	Writer(s)	Original album	Length
16.	"RRNN (Straight Outta Shibuya)" (Remix of "Right Right Now Now" by Kan Takagi)	A. Horovitz, M. Diamond, A. Yauch	To the 5 Boroughs	2:46

== Charts ==
Chart	Peak position
Australian Albums (ARIA)	63
US Billboard 200	42
US Top Catalog Albums (Billboard)	4
US Billboard Digital Albums	23
US Top R&B/Hip-Hop Albums (Billboard)	30
US Top Rap Albums (Billboard)	17

== Certifications ==
Region	Certification	Certified units/sales
United Kingdom (BPI)	Gold	100,000^{‡}
United States (RIAA) Video	Gold	50,000^{^}
^{^} Shipments figures based on certification alone.^{‡} Sales+streaming figures based on certification alone.
