= Awesome; I Fuckin' Shot That! =

- Directed by: Nathaniel Hörnblowér
- Produced by: Jon Doran; Daniel Katz; Randy Manis; Jeff Sackman; Mark Urman; Nathaniel Hörnblowér
- Starring: Mike D Ad Rock; MCA; Mix Master Mike; Money Mark; Doug E. Fresh; Alfredo Ortiz; David Cross
- Edited by: Michael Boczon; Remi Gletsos; Phil Knowlton; Neal Usatin
- Music by: Michael Diamond; Adam Horovitz; Adam Yauch; Doug E. Fresh; Money Mark
- Distributed by: THINKFilm
- Release date: March 31, 2006
- Running time: 90 minutes
- Country: United States
- Language: English

Awesome; I Fuckin' Shot That! (alternate title: Awesome; I... Shot That!) is a 2006 concert film by American hip-hop group Beastie Boys, directed by Adam Yauch under the name Nathaniel Hörnblowér. It was created by giving camcorders to 50 audience members of a sold out concert at Madison Square Garden on October 9, 2004. The audience members were instructed to keep the cameras rolling at all times. For a low budget operation, all cameras were returned to the place of purchase for a refund.

The film first screened on January 6, 2006 to the fans that shot the footage. Also that same month it was shown at the Sundance Film Festival. There was a one-night screening across the country on March 23, and the film was then given a general release on March 31, 2006.

The DVD of the concert film was released on July 24, 2006 in the UK and July 25, 2006 in the US.

During a promotional performance on the Late Show with David Letterman, members of the audience were given camcorders to film the televised performance in a similar fashion to that of the film.

The film also screened at South by Southwest, Wisconsin Film Festival, Dead Center Film Festival, Copenhagen Film Festival and Era New Horizons Film Festival in Poland.

Cameo appearances during the show on and near the stage include Doug E. Fresh, formerly of Doug E. Fresh and the Get Fresh Crew, and DMC, of the rap group Run DMC.

Ben Stiller and his wife Christine Taylor can be seen multiple times, even rapping along during "Sure Shot" in the film as members of the audience. They are also interviewed on film at the show's end. Donald Glover can also be seen as an audience member. David Cross plays Nathaniel Hörnblowér.

== Setlist ==
1. Mixmaster Mike Intro
2. "Triple Trouble"
3. "Sure Shot"
4. "Root Down"
5. "Hello Brooklyn"
6. "Time to Get Ill"
7. "All Lifestyles"
8. "Pass the Mic"
9. "Shake Your Rump"
10. Mixmaster Mix Interlude
11. "Sabrosa"
12. "Ricky's Theme"
13. "Something's Got to Give"
14. "An Open Letter to NYC"
15. "Right Right Now Now"
16. "Paul Revere"
17. "Body Movin'"
18. "Three MC's and One DJ"
19. "Brass Monkey"
20. "So What'cha Want"
21. "Ch-Check It Out"
22. "Intergalactic"
23. "Gratitude"
24. "Sabotage"
