= List of songs in Rock Band 2 =

Rock Band 2 is a 2008 music video game developed by Harmonix and distributed by MTV Games and Electronic Arts. The game, a sequel to Rock Band, has been released for the Xbox 360, PlayStation 3, Wii and PlayStation 2. Rock Band allows one to four players to simulate the playing of rock music by providing the players with peripherals modeled after musical instruments (a guitar peripheral for lead guitar and bass gameplay, a drum peripheral, and a microphone). The gameplay in Rock Band 2 is nearly identical to the original Rock Band, while also comparable to that in Guitar Hero.

The game disc features 84 songs, all of which are master recordings. In addition, the game supports existing downloadable content from Rock Band, as well as tracks which have been exported from other Rock Band game discs. Twenty additional tracks were released exclusively for Rock Band 2 as free downloadable content after the game was released. A redeemable code that allows the player access to these songs is included with new copies of the game, except for the Wii version, where no code is required.

With Rock Band 3, Xbox 360, PlayStation 3, and Wii players could export 70 of 84 songs by purchasing an Export Key for US$9.99. The 9 songs from bands fronted by Harmonix staff members are not offered in the initial export package; however, these songs are offered at no cost in the "Rock Band Free 01" pack for the PlayStation 3 and Xbox 360, released on January 4, 2011. The export for the Xbox 360 and PlayStation 3 versions requires the code located on the back of the Rock Band 2 instruction manual; this is the same code used for the redemption of the aforementioned bonus content. The process for export differs slightly on both platforms: Xbox 360 users only need to redeem the manual code directly within Rock Band 3 while PlayStation 3 users must redeem the manual code on the Rock Band website and then use the code given from the website within Rock Band 3. EA support will accommodate users who may have lost or discarded their previous code. Wii users only need to have a Rock Band 2 save file present and pay the export fee to perform the export function; however, tracks are downloaded individually, allowing the user to delete unwanted songs. As of 2017, the ability to export Rock Band 2 to later Rock Band titles had expired; however, users who have previously exported Rock Band 2 are eligible to receive the songs in Rock Band 4.

Five songs were not exportable to Rock Band 3: "Let There Be Rock" by AC/DC, "Any Way You Want It" by Journey, "Battery" by Metallica, "Give It Away" by Red Hot Chili Peppers and "Spoonman" by Soundgarden. "Give It Away" and "Spoonman" were included as part of the Rock Band Blitz soundtrack but with updated charts and difficulty levels, of which can be exported to Rock Band 3. The two songs were also later released as downloadable singles for Rock Band 3, and both are available with pro guitar and bass upgrades.

== Track listing ==
Each of the 84 songs is categorized on-disc by difficulty (0 dots being the easiest and 5 red dots being the most difficult) for each instrument, as well as the entire band. Players can also choose from one of four skill levels (Easy, Medium, Hard, and Expert). Unlike previous installments in the Guitar Hero and Rock Band series, the nine bonus songs are integrated with the other 75 songs in the game's track listing. Each on-disc song in this game's setlist has received their "Supervision-Recommended" song content ratings instead of their "Family-Friendly" song content ratings.

Song title	Artist	Year	Genre	Exportable?	Rewind DLC
"A Jagged Gorgeous Winter" (Note: This song is offered in the "Rock Band Free 01" pack on Xbox 360 and PlayStation 3.)	The Main Drag	2007	Indie Rock	Rock Band Free 01	Yes
"Ace of Spades '08"	Motörhead	2008	Metal	Yes	Yes
"Alabama Getaway"	The Grateful Dead	1980	Classic Rock	Yes	No
"Alex Chilton"	The Replacements	1987	Rock	Yes	No
"Alive"	Pearl Jam	1991	Grunge	Yes	No (Note: Alternative Version available as DLC.)
"Almost Easy"	Avenged Sevenfold	2007	Metal	Yes	No
"American Woman"	The Guess Who	1970	Classic Rock	Yes	No
"Any Way You Want It"	Journey	1980	Classic Rock	No	No
"Aqualung"	Jethro Tull	1971	Progressive	Yes	No
"Bad Reputation"	Joan Jett	1980	Punk	Yes	Yes
"Battery"	Metallica	1986	Metal	No	No
"Bodhisattva"	Steely Dan	1973	Classic Rock	Yes	No
"Carry On Wayward Son"	Kansas	1976	Progressive	Yes	Yes
"Chop Suey"	System of a Down	2001	Nu-Metal	Yes	Yes
"Colony of Birchmen"	Mastodon	2006	Metal	Yes	No
"Come Out and Play (Keep 'Em Separated)"	The Offspring	1994	Punk	Yes	Yes
"Conventional Lover"	Speck	2007	Pop-Rock	Rock Band Free 01	Yes
"Cool for Cats"	Squeeze	1979	New Wave	Yes	No
"De-Luxe"	Lush	1990	Alternative	Yes	No
"Down with the Sickness"	Disturbed	2000	Nu-Metal	Yes	Yes
"Drain You"	Nirvana	1991	Grunge	Yes	No
"E-Pro"	Beck	2005	Alternative	Yes	No
"Everlong"	Foo Fighters	1997	Alternative	Yes	Yes
"Eye of the Tiger"	Survivor	1982	Rock	Yes	Yes
"Feel the Pain"	Dinosaur Jr.	1994	Alternative	Yes	No
"Float On"	Modest Mouse	2004	Indie Rock	Yes	No
"Get Clean"	Anarchy Club	2008	Metal	Rock Band Free 01	Yes
"Girl's Not Grey"	AFI	2003	Alternative	Yes	No
"Give It All"	Rise Against	2004	Punk	Yes	No
"Give It Away" (Note: This song is included in the Rock Band Blitz soundtrack.) (Note: This song is also available as a downloadable single for Rock Band 3.)	Red Hot Chili Peppers	1991	Alternative	No	No
"Go Your Own Way"	Fleetwood Mac	1977	Classic Rock	Yes	Yes
"Hello There"	Cheap Trick	1977	Rock	Yes	Yes
"Hungry Like the Wolf"	Duran Duran	1982	Pop-Rock	Yes	Yes
"I Was Wrong"	Social Distortion	1996	Punk	Yes	No
"Kids in America"	The Muffs	1995	Pop-Rock	Yes	No
"Lazy Eye"	Silversun Pickups	2006	Indie Rock	Yes	No
"Let There Be Rock" (Note: A live version of this song is available on the AC/DC Track Pack.)	AC/DC	1977	Rock	No	No
"Livin' on a Prayer"	Bon Jovi	1986	Rock	Yes	Yes
"Lump"	Presidents of the United States of America	1995	Pop-Rock	Yes	No
"Man in the Box"	Alice in Chains	1990	Grunge	Yes	Yes
"Master Exploder"	Tenacious D	2006	Rock	Yes	Yes
"Mountain Song"	Jane's Addiction	1988	Alternative	Yes	No
"My Own Worst Enemy"	Lit	1999	Pop-Rock	Yes	Yes
"New Kid in School"	The Donnas	2007	Rock	Yes	No
"Night Lies"	Bang Camaro	2008	Rock	Rock Band Free 01	Yes
"Nine in the Afternoon"	Panic! at the Disco	2008	Pop-Rock	Yes	Yes
"One Step Closer"	Linkin Park	2000	Nu-Metal	Yes	Yes
"One Way or Another"	Blondie	1978	Pop-Rock	Yes	Yes
"Our Truth"	Lacuna Coil	2006	Metal	Yes	No
"Painkiller"	Judas Priest	1990	Metal	Yes	No
"Panic Attack"	Dream Theater	2005	Progressive	Yes	No
"PDA"	Interpol	2002	Indie Rock	Yes	No
"Peace Sells"	Megadeth	1986	Metal	Yes	Yes
"Pinball Wizard"	The Who	1969	Classic Rock	Yes	No
"Pretend We're Dead"	L7	1992	Grunge	Yes	No
"Psycho Killer"	Talking Heads	1977	New Wave	Yes	No
"Pump It Up"	Elvis Costello	1978	Rock	Yes	No
"Ramblin' Man"	The Allman Brothers Band	1973	Southern Rock	Yes	No
"Rebel Girl"	Bikini Kill	1993	Punk	Yes	No
"Rob the Prez-O-Dent"	That Handsome Devil	2008	Rock	Rock Band Free 01	Yes
"Rock'n Me"	Steve Miller Band	1976	Classic Rock	Yes	No
"Round and Round"	Ratt	1984	Metal	Yes	Yes
"Shackler's Revenge"	Guns N' Roses	2008	Rock	Yes	No
"Shooting Star"	Bad Company	1975	Classic Rock	Yes	No
"Shoulder to the Plow"	Breaking Wheel	2008	Metal	Rock Band Free 01	Yes
"So What'cha Want"	Beastie Boys	1992	Rock	Yes	Yes
"Souls of Black"	Testament	1990	Metal	Yes	No
"Spirit in the Sky"	Norman Greenbaum	1969	Classic Rock	Yes	No
"Spoonman"	Soundgarden	1994	Grunge	No	Yes
"Supreme Girl"	The Sterns	2006	Pop-Rock	Rock Band Free 01	No
"Tangled Up in Blue"	Bob Dylan	1975	Classic Rock	Yes	No
"Teen Age Riot"	Sonic Youth	1988	Alternative	Yes	No
"Testify"	Rage Against the Machine	1999	Alternative	Yes	Yes
"That's What You Get"	Paramore	2007	Pop-Rock	Yes	Yes
"The Middle"	Jimmy Eat World	2001	Pop-Rock	Yes	Yes
"The Trees (Vault Edition)"	Rush	1978	Progressive	Yes	No
"Today"	The Smashing Pumpkins	1993	Alternative	Yes	No
"Uncontrollable Urge"	Devo	1978	New Wave	Yes	No
"Visions"	Abnormality	2007	Metal	Rock Band Free 01	No
"We Got the Beat"	The Go-Go's	1981	Pop-Rock	Yes	Yes
"Welcome to the Neighborhood"	Libyans	2008	Punk	Rock Band Free 01	No
"Where'd You Go?"	The Mighty Mighty Bosstones	1991	Alternative	Yes	No
"White Wedding (Part 1)"	Billy Idol	1982	Rock	Yes	Yes
"You Oughta Know"	Alanis Morissette	1995	Pop-Rock	Yes	Yes
