= Right Right Now Now =

Single by Beastie Boys

from the album To the 5 Boroughs
- B-side: "Brr Stick 'Em"
- Released: 2004
- Recorded: 2004
- Genre: Hip-hop
- Length: 2:46
- Label: Capitol, Grand Royal
- Songwriters: Michael Diamond, Adam Horovitz, Adam Yauch, Domenick Costa, Martin Rackin, Philip Zeller, Tony Romeo
- Producer: Mario Caldato Jr.

Beastie Boys singles chronology
"Triple Trouble" (2004)	"Right Right Now Now" (2004)	"Now Get Busy" (2004)

Music video
- "Right Right Now Now" on YouTube

"Right Right Now Now" is a song by American rap rock group the Beastie Boys, released as the third single from their sixth studio album To the 5 Boroughs.

The trio, along with Doug E. Fresh, performed the song on the November 11, 2004 episode of Late Night with Conan O'Brien.

== Track listing ==
U.S. CD single

1. "Right Right Now Now" (Clean album version)
2. "Right Right Now Now" (A cappella version)

Japan CD single

1. "Right Right Now Now" (Album version) – 2:46
2. "Rizzle Rizzle Nizzle Nizzle" – 3:04
3. "MTL Reppin' for the 514" – 2:58
4. "An Open Letter to NYC" (Album version) – 4:18
5. "Brrr Stick Em" – 2:26
6. "Ch-Check It Out" (Just Blaze Remix) – 4:24
7. "Sabotage" (Live) – 3:30

== Charts ==
Chart (2004)	Peak position
U.S. Billboard Modern Rock Tracks	25
