= Colony of Birchmen =

2007 single by Mastodon

Single by Mastodon and Josh Homme

from the album Blood Mountain
- B-side: "Iron Tusk"
- Released: March 12, 2007
- Length: 4:19
- Label: Warner Music
- Songwriters: Brann Dailor, Brent Hinds, Bill Kelliher, Troy Sanders
- Producer: Matt Bayles/Mastodon

Mastodon and Josh Homme singles chronology
"The Wolf is Loose" (2006)	"Colony of Birchmen" (2007)	"Divinations" (2009)

"Colony of Birchmen" is a single by American heavy metal band Mastodon. It was featured on the group's third album, Blood Mountain. The song features backing vocals from Josh Homme, lead singer of the alternative rock band Queens of the Stone Age and former guitarist of Kyuss.

It is Mastodon's first single to reach the Hot Mainstream Rock Tracks chart, reaching #33, and was performed live on Late Night with Conan O'Brien on November 1, 2006. It was also nominated for a Grammy Award for Best Metal Performance, but lost to Slayer's "Eyes of the Insane".

The song's title is a homage to the Genesis song "The Colony of Slippermen." Drummer Brann Dailor has said that The Lamb Lies Down on Broadway, on which "Slippermen" appears, is his all-time favorite album.

The song is part of the Rock Band 2 main setlist and also in Saints Row 2 as a radio song.

A music video was created for the song which features the band performing in a cavern, Ruby Falls, while strange phenomena occur above on the surface in a forest along with people that are associated with the events.

A live XFM version was featured on the Oblivion EP.

== Track listing ==
1. "Colony of Birchmen"
2. "Iron Tusk" (Live)
3. "Naked Burn"

== Chart positions ==
Weekly chart performance for "Colony of Birchmen"
Chart (2007)	Peak position
US Mainstream Rock (Billboard)	33

== Personnel ==
- Troy Sanders − bass, vocals
- Brent Hinds − lead guitar, vocals
- Bill Kelliher − rhythm guitar, backing vocals
- Brann Dailor − drums
- Joshua Homme − guest vocals
