= Milarepa Fund =

American pro-Tibetan non-profit organization

The Milarepa Fund is an American non-profit organization founded by musician Adam Yauch and Erin Potts that raises money for and promotes awareness of the Tibetan independence movement.

== History ==
The Milarepa Fund was founded in May 1994, by musician Adam "MCA" Yauch (part of the hip hop trio the Beastie Boys) and activist Erin Potts. Named after the 11th century Tibetan singer and yogi Milarepa, the fund was originally intended to support Tibetan independence by distributing royalties from Yauch's Beastie Boys' 1994 songs "Shambala" and "Bodhisattva Vow". These songs sample the chanting of Tibetan monks. Yauch, a convert to Buddhism, met Tibetan activists and the Dalai Lama during a trip to Nepal and India, where he was inspired by the cause. The first action for the fund was during the 1994 Lollapalooza tour. Because the Beastie Boys were co-headlining the tour, the Milarepa Fund erected information tents throughout the tour to disseminate pro-Tibetan independence pamphlets. Some fans were receptive to the pamphlets, but others were hostile and later blamed Yauch's interest in the Milarepa Fund for the late release of the Beastie Boys' fifth album, Hello Nasty.

In another effort to create awareness and raise funds, the Milarepa Fund organized the two-day Tibetan Freedom Concert in 1996 at Golden Gate Park in San Francisco, California. It raised over US$800,000 for Tibetan exile organizations. The success of the concert spawned a Free Tibet Tour that summer in conjunction with Students for a Free Tibet (SFT) and the International Campaign for Tibet (ICT). Other two-day concerts similar to the 1996 event followed in 1997, 1998, and 1999. In 1998, the Milarepa Fund, SFT, and ICT organized a protest for Tibetan independence in Washington, DC, on the US Capitol lawn, claiming an attendance of 15,000. Following Yauch's death of cancer in 2012, it has mostly been inactive.
