= Jimmy James (song) =

1992 single by Beastie Boys

Single by Beastie Boys

from the album Check Your Head
- B-side: "The Maestro", "Boomin' Granny," "Drinkin' Wine"
- Released: August 28, 1992
- Recorded: G-Son Studios, Atwater Village
- Genre: Hip-hop
- Length: 3:14 (album version); 3:05 (original/single version)
- Label: Capitol/Grand Royal
- Songwriters: Beastie Boys, Mario Caldato Jr.
- Producers: Beastie Boys, Mario Caldato Jr.

Beastie Boys singles chronology
"So What'cha Want" (1992)	"Jimmy James" (1992)	"Gratitude" (1992)

Music video
- "Jimmy James" on YouTube

"Jimmy James" is the third single from American rap rock band the Beastie Boys' third album Check Your Head.

== Music video ==
MTV and VH1 credit the "Jimmy James" music video to Nathanial Hörnblowér, Adam Yauch's director alter ego. However, on the Beastie Boys' Sabotage VHS tape released in 1994, the "Jimmy James" music video is listed as being co-directed by Yauch (as Nathanial Hörnblowér) and Lisa Ann Cabasa, an actress, and Yauch's girlfriend at the time the video was made. Cabasa directed the dance sequences in the music video and also appeared in the video as one of the silhouetted female dancers.

== Formats and track listing ==
U.S. CD single

1. "Jimmy James" (single version) – 3:05
2. "The Maestro" – 2:52
3. "Jimmy James" (LP version) – 3:14
4. "Boomin' Granny" – 2:18
5. "Jimmy James" (original original version) – 3:42
6. "Drinkin' Wine" – 4:42

European CD single

1. "Jimmy James" (single version) – 3:05
2. "Jimmy James" (LP version) – 3:14
3. "Jimmy James" (original original version) – 3:42
4. "The Maestro" – 2:52

UK CD single Frozen Metal Head EP

1. "Jimmy James" (single version) – 3:05
2. "The Blue Nun" – 0:31
3. "Jimmy James" (original original version) – 3:42
4. "Drinkin' Wine" – 4:42

U.S. 12-inch single
A1. "Jimmy James" (single version) – 3:05
A2. "Jimmy James" (LP version) – 3:14
A3. "Jimmy James" (original original version) – 3:42
B1. "The Maestro" – 2:52
B2. "Boomin' Granny" – 2:18
B3. "Drinkin' Wine" – 4:42

European 12-inch single
A2. "Jimmy James" (LP version) – 3:14
A3. "Jimmy James" (original original version) – 3:42
B1. "The Maestro" – 2:52
B2. "Boomin' Granny" – 2:18

UK 12-inch single Frozen Metal Head EP
A1. "Jimmy James" (single version) – 3:05
A2. "So What'cha Want" (All the Way freestyle version) – 3:37
B1. "Jimmy James" (original original version) – 3:42
B2. "Drinkin' Wine" – 4:42

== In popular culture ==
The name of the character Jimmy James played by Stephen Root on the television series NewsRadio came from this song.

== Personnel ==
Beastie Boys

- Mike D – vocals, producer
- MCA – vocals, producer
- Ad-Rock – vocals, producer

Production

- Mario Caldato, Jr – producer
- Tom Baker – mastering

Other personnel

- Eric Haze – artwork

== Charts ==
In the UK, the song charted as a part of the EP Frozen Metal Head.

Chart (1992)	Peak position
UK Singles Chart	55
