= Atwater Village, Los Angeles =

Atwater Village
- Neighborhood
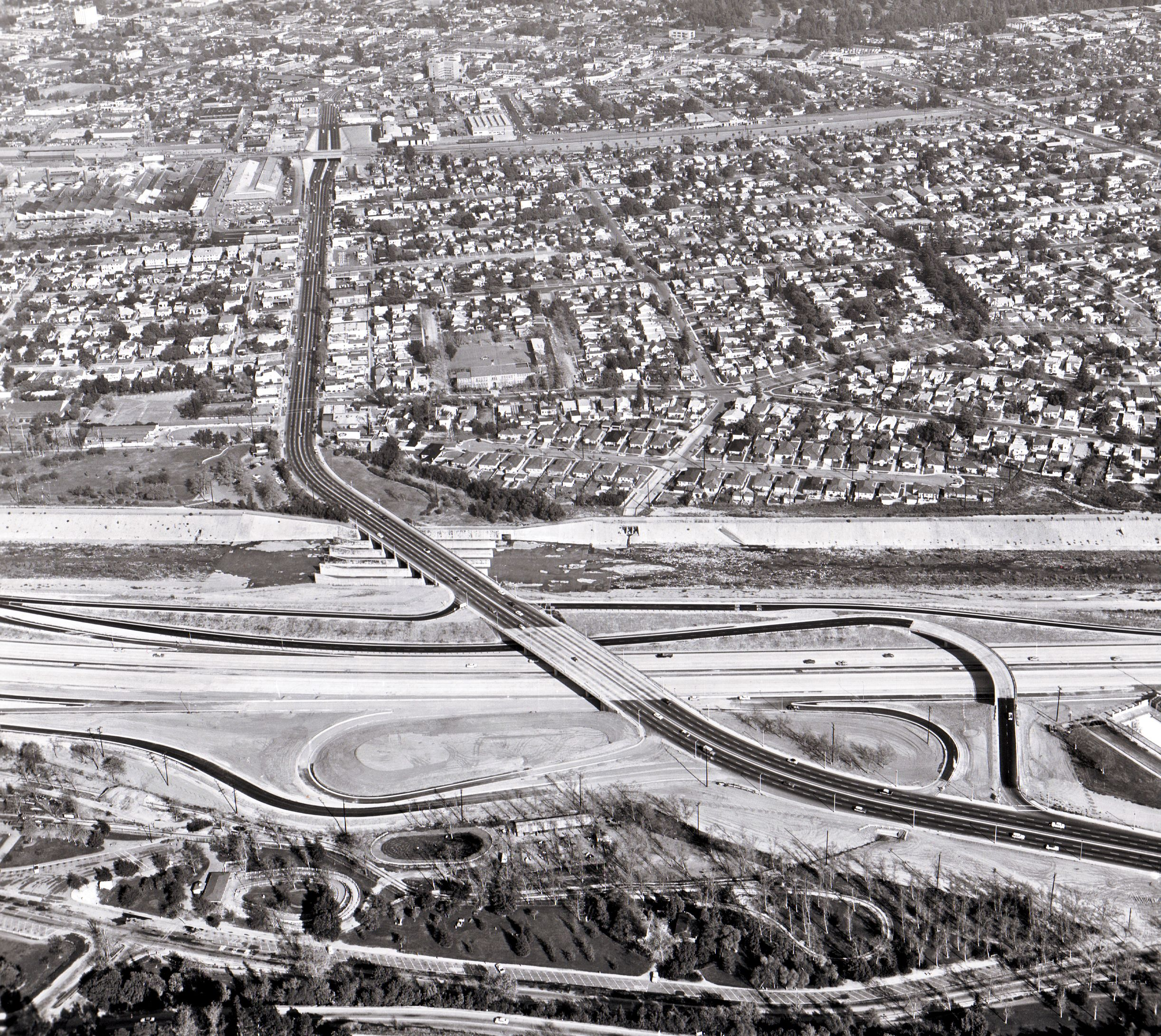
- Aerial view of recently constructed Golden State Freeway (I-5) with Atwater Village in the background, separated by the Los Angeles River (1957)

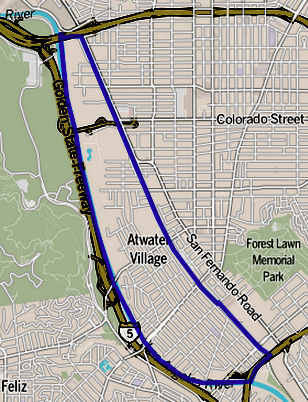
- Boundaries of Atwater Village as drawn by the Los Angeles Times

- Location in Northeast Los Angeles
- Coordinates: 34°06′59″N 118°15′23″W
- Country: United States
- State: California
- County: Los Angeles
- City: Los Angeles
- Named for: Atwater Tract, the original railroad tract beside (or at) the water of the Los Angeles River
- Elevation: 410 ft (120 m)
- Time zone: UTC-8 (PST)
  - Summer (DST): UTC-7 (PDT)
- ZIP Code: 90039
- Area codes: 213, 323

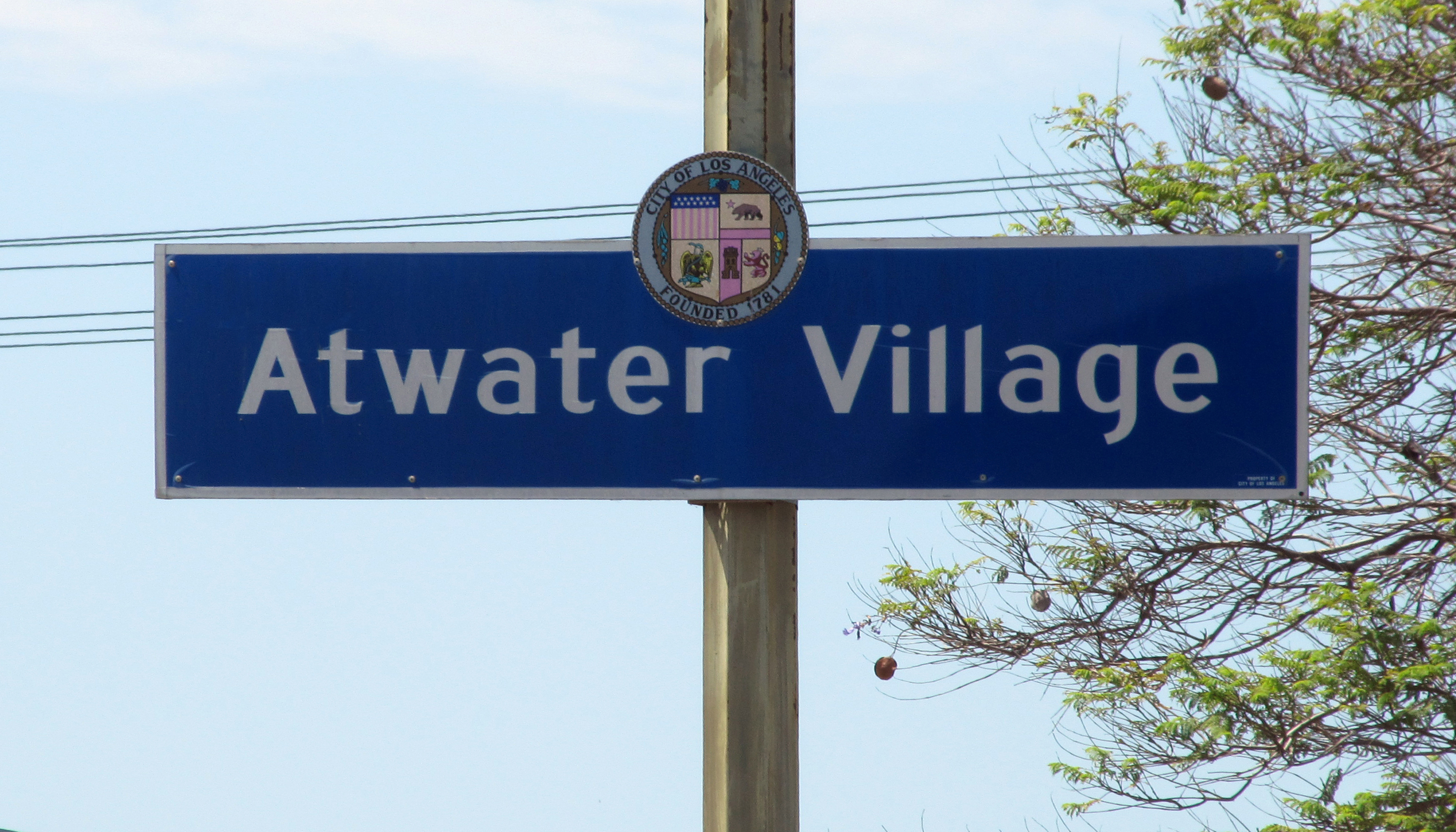
Atwater Village Neighborhood Sign located on Glendale Boulevard at Seneca Avenue

Atwater Village is a neighborhood in the 13th district of Los Angeles, California. Much of Atwater Village lies in the fertile Los Angeles River flood plain. Located in the northeast region of the city, Atwater Village borders Griffith Park and Silver Lake to the west, Glendale to the north and east and Glassell Park to the south. The eastern boundary is essentially the railroad tracks (originally, the Southern Pacific). The area has three elementary schools—two public and one private. Almost half the residents were born abroad, a high percentage for the city of Los Angeles.

== History ==
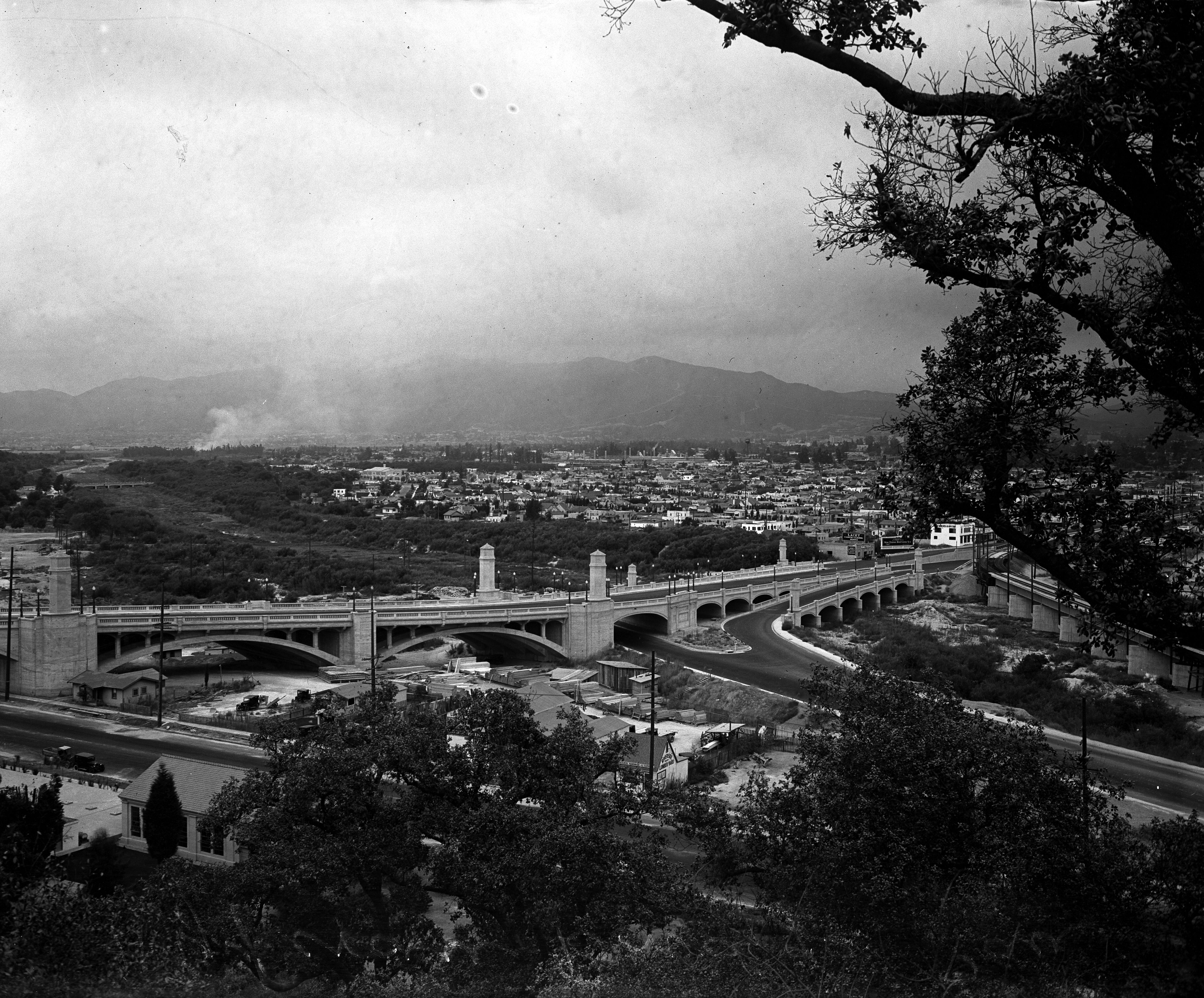
1927 photo showing historic Glendale–Hyperion Bridge connecting Silverlake and Atwater Village.

Much of Northeastern Los Angeles was part of Rancho San Rafael, until 1868, when parts of it were purchased by W.C.B. Richardson, who renamed it Rancho Santa Eulalia. The entire region was subdivided and sold to home builders in 1902, with the Atwater Village portion being named as such due to its proximity to the Los Angeles River. The area was initially named "Atwater," while the "Village" was added in 1986.

Initial residents included the newly created middle-class workers employed at the nearby DWP substation. The location between the Los Angeles and Glendale city cores made it a highly sought after residential neighborhood beginning in the 1920s. The majority of homes and structures in Atwater Village have never been demolished (although many have changed in use or have been renovated), resulting in the neighborhood having one of the highest number of structures built before 1939 in Los Angeles County.

Since 2015, the neighborhood has seen an increase in gentrification.

== Population ==
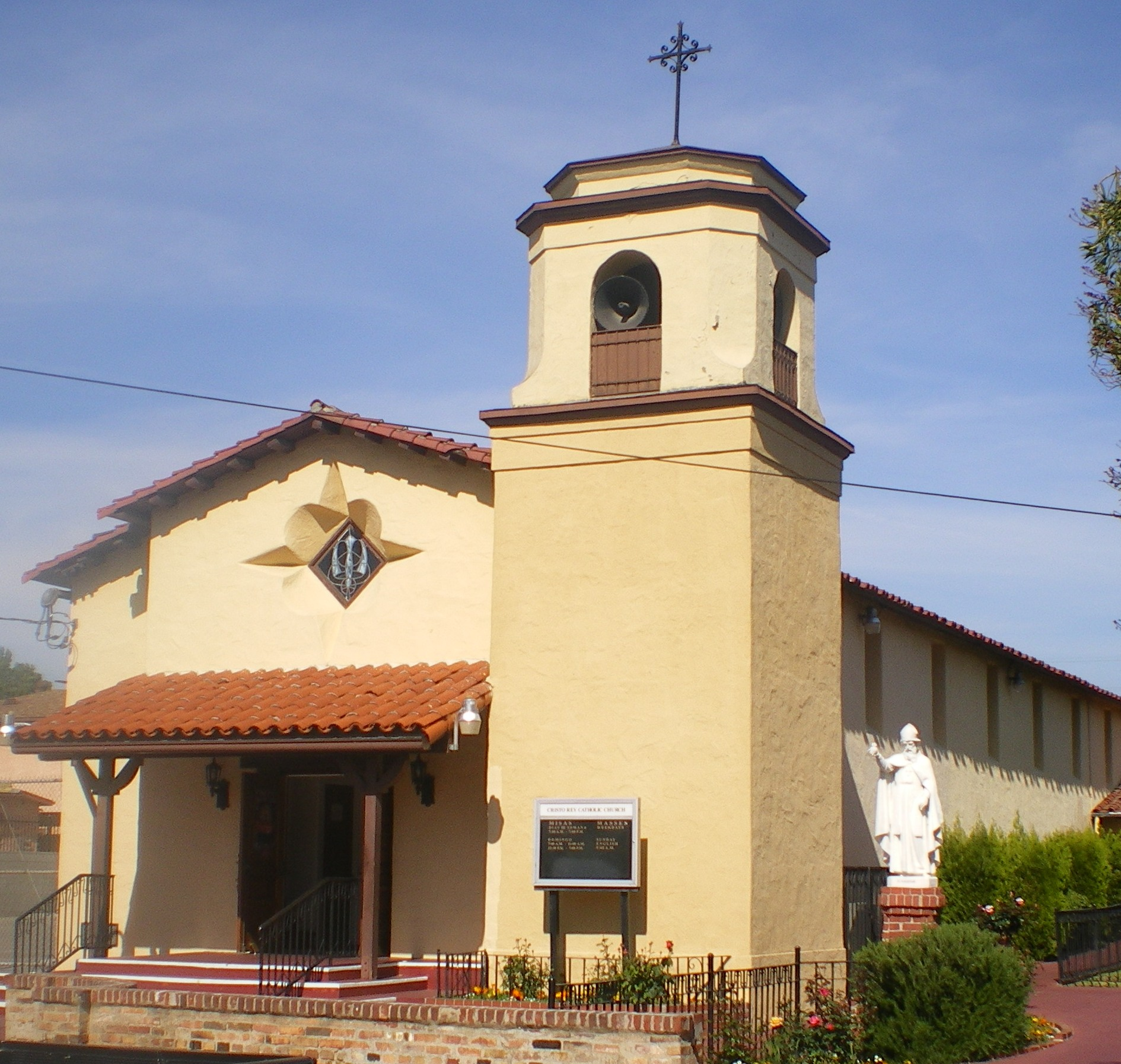
Cristo Rey Catholic Church.

=== 2000 census ===
The 2000 U.S. census counted 14,888 residents in the 1.78-square-mile Atwater Village neighborhood—or 8,379 people per square mile, an average population density for the city. The median age for residents was 34, about average for the city.

The neighborhood was considered highly diverse ethnically, with a high percentage of Asians. The breakdown was Latinos, 51.3%; whites, 22.2%; Asians, 19.7%; black, 1.4%; and others, 5.4%. Mexico (27.2%) and the Philippines (20.4%) were the most common places of birth for the 49.3% of the residents who were born abroad—a high percentage, compared to the city at large.

The median yearly household income in 2008 dollars was $53,872, an average figure for Los Angeles. The percentages of households that earned $20,000 to $60,000 yearly were high for Los Angeles County. The average household size of 2.7 people was average for Los Angeles. Renters occupied 59.6% of the housing stock, and house or apartment owners held 40.4%. The percentage of never-married women was among the county's highest.

=== 2008 estimate ===
In 2008, the city estimated that 15,455 people lived in Atwater Village.

=== 2013 findings ===
Census tracts 1883, 1881 and 1871.01 lie wholly within Atwater Village boundaries, and a large portion of census tract 1871.02 is also within Atwater Village. Census tract 1883 had a median income of $31,111 and was 37.8% non-Hispanic white, 34.1% Hispanic, 20.2% Asian, 1.6% Pacific Islander and 1.1% black. Census tract 1871.01 had a median income of $72,526 and was 42.9% non-Hispanic white, 34.4% Hispanic, 21.2% Asian and 1.4% black. Census tract 1881 was 60.3% Hispanic, 23.9% non-Hispanic white, 13.2% Asian, 2% black and 1.3% American Indian or Alaska Native. Median income for this census tract was $30,996. Census tract 1871.02 was 47.9% Hispanic, 27.5% non-Hispanic white, 13.9% Asian and 8.4% black, with a median income of $24,852.

== Geography ==
Much of Atwater lies in the old Los Angeles River flood plain, which resulted in deep, fertile soil.

According to the Mapping L.A. project of the Los Angeles Times, Atwater Village is bordered on the north and east by Glendale, on the southeast by Glassell Park, on the south by Echo Park, on the southwest by Los Feliz and Silver Lake and on the west by Griffith Park.

Street and other boundary limits are the Ventura Freeway on the north, San Fernando Boulevard on the east, and the Los Angeles River on the south and west.

Climate data for Atwater Village, Los Angeles
Month	Jan	Feb	Mar	Apr	May	Jun	Jul	Aug	Sep	Oct	Nov	Dec	Year
Mean daily maximum °F (°C)	68 (20)	70 (21)	70 (21)	75 (24)	76 (24)	82 (28)	87 (31)	88 (31)	86 (30)	81 (27)	74 (23)	69 (21)	77 (25)
Mean daily minimum °F (°C)	45 (7)	47 (8)	48 (9)	51 (11)	55 (13)	59 (15)	62 (17)	63 (17)	62 (17)	56 (13)	49 (9)	45 (7)	54 (12)
Average precipitation inches (mm)	3.74 (95)	4.19 (106)	3.56 (90)	0.90 (23)	0.34 (8.6)	0.08 (2.0)	0.02 (0.51)	0.15 (3.8)	0.35 (8.9)	0.49 (12)	1.26 (32)	2.10 (53)	17.17 (436)

== Education ==
22% of Atwater Park residents aged 25 and older held a four-year degree by 2000, an average figure for both the city and the county.

=== Schools ===
- Glenfeliz Boulevard Elementary School, LAUSD, 3955 Glenfeliz Boulevard
- Holy Trinity Elementary School, private, 3716 Boyce Avenue
- Atwater Avenue Elementary School, LAUSD, 3271 Silver Lake Boulevard

=== Library ===
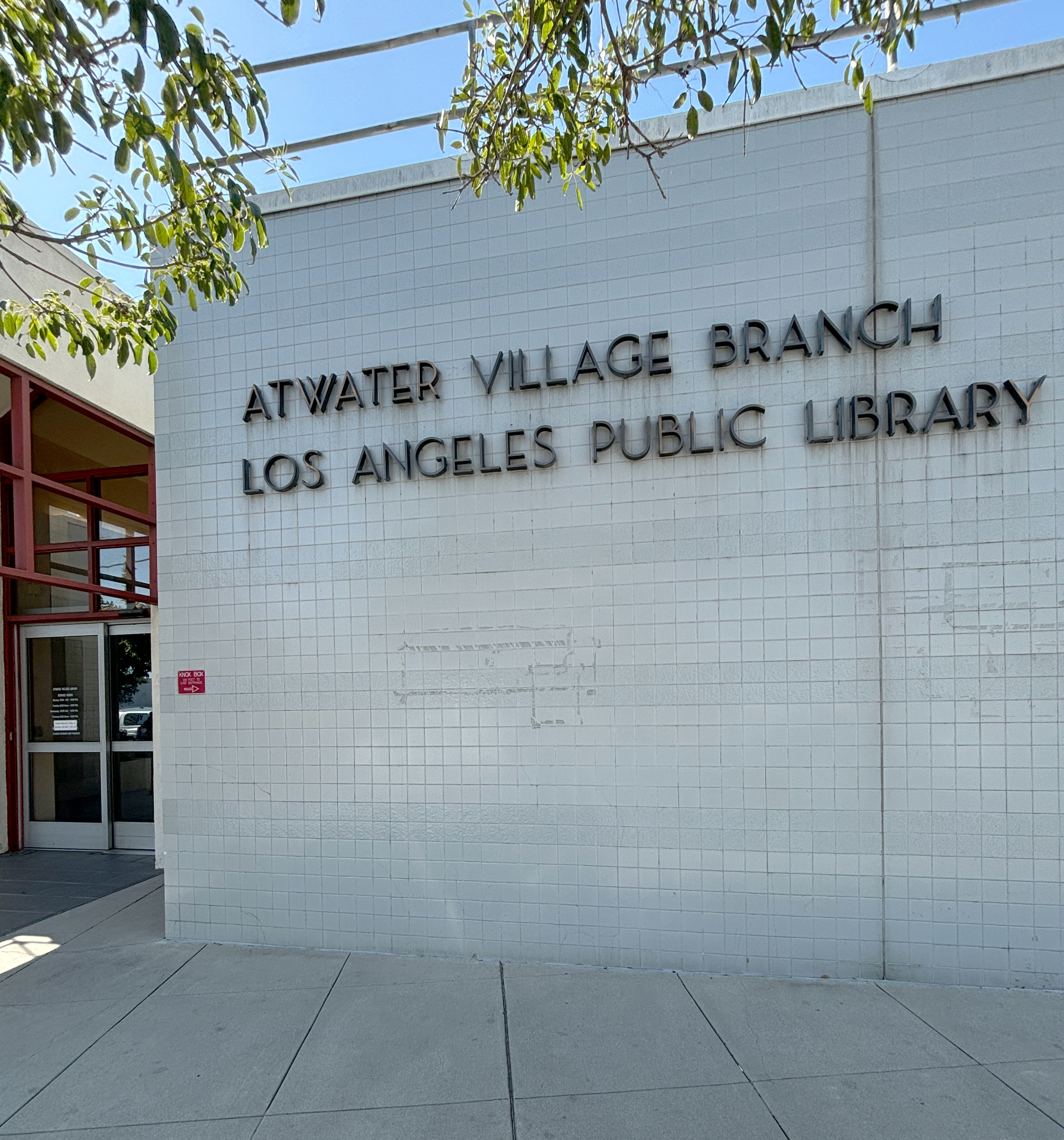
Atwater Village Library in 2024

The Atwater Village District is served by the Atwater Village Branch of the Los Angeles Public Library. It is located at 3379 Glendale Boulevard, east of the Los Angeles River and Interstate 5.

== Transportation ==
Atwater Village is close to the Interstate 5, SR 134, SR 2 and SR 110 freeways.

It is served by several Metro Bus lines, including the 92, 94 & 180. It also is adjacent to Metrolink Glendale Station.

== In popular culture ==
A number of film locations in Atwater Village were used for Quentin Tarantino’s Pulp Fiction (1994), including the house of Lance (Eric Stoltz) and his wife, Jody (Rosanna Arquette). The intersection of Fletcher Drive and Atwater Avenue also appears briefly in a pivotal scene where Bruce Willis’s character, Butch, hits Marsellus Wallace with his car.

The Beastie Boys recorded their albums Check Your Head (1992) and Ill Communication (1994) at G-Son, the recording studio they established in 1991 in Atwater Village. The neighborhood also provided the backdrop for some of the group’s music videos, including Pass the Mic (1992).

Anthony Bourdain featured Tacos Villa Corona in the Jan. 2012 season finale of his series The Layover.

The Tam O'Shanter, operating in Atwater Village since 1922, has appeared in Mad Men, The Office, Glee, Larry Crowne, among others. In 2020, the Streamline Moderne–style building at 2751 Fletcher Drive was used in the Netflix series Hollywood, where it was reimagined as the “Golden Tip” gas station. In 2024, the same building appeared in HBO’s The Sympathizer, based on the Pulitzer Prize–winning novel by Viet Thanh Nguyen.

== Notable people ==
- Morena Baccarin, actress
- Don Bachardy, portrait artist
- Alexa Demie, actress
- Alexander Gould, actor
- Tim Heidecker, comedian, writer, actor
- Riley Keough, actress
- Peter Krasnow, modernist artist
- Atsuko Okatsuka, comedian
- Allan Pineda of the Black Eyed Peas
- Lari Pittman, artist
- Giovanni Ribisi, actor
- Kiefer Sutherland, actor
- Constance Wu, actress

== See also ==
- List of districts and neighborhoods in Los Angeles
