= G-Son Studios =

Los Angeles-based recording studios

- Atwater Community Center
- Interactive map of G-Son Studios
- Address: 3218 Glendale Boulevard, Atwater Village, Los Angeles
- Coordinates: 34°07′4.57″N 118°15′37.94″W
- Type: Recording studios

Construction
- Years active: 1991-present

Website
- gsonstudios.com

G-Son Studios are studios established in 1991 in Los Angeles, California, by the hip-hop group the Beastie Boys.

== History ==
G-Son was established in a ballroom on the site of the former Atwater Community Center, on the corner of Glendale Boulevard and Larga Avenue in Atwater Village, LA. The Beastie Boys established the studios as a way of saving money as the cost of renting studio space whilst making the commercially-unsuccessful album Paul's Boutique had been prohibitive.

The studios were named after a neighboring plumber's shop named Gilson, which had an "i" and "l" missing from its sign. Interior remodelling of the site was largely done by Mark "Money Mark" Nishita, who was then working as a carpenter. The Beasties included a basketball court and a skate ramp in their studio so that they could entertain themselves between recording sessions. Adam "Ad-Rock" Horovitz said of G-Son that "We had time and space to get serious – that clubhouse turned us into musicians".

Albums recorded at the site include Ill Communication and Check Your Head. Videos shot at the location include the one that accompanied the Beasties' 1992 single "Pass the Mic".

The location also served as the HQ for the Beasties' recording label, Grand Royal, as well as that of Mike "Mike D" Diamond's clothing range, X-Large. By 2004 the site was no longer in regular use by the Beasties, who had returned to New York.

== Post-Beastie Boys ==
The site was sold in 2006, and as of 2025 remains in use as a recording studio and space for creatives, with the building decorated with a mural dedicated to Adam "MCA" Yauch. During the 2020s, WIP (Work In Progress), a series of dance exhibitions, has been regularly held at G-Son to show-case the works in progress of upcoming artists as well as providing rehearsal space for them.
