= Gratitude (Beastie Boys song) =

Single by Beastie Boys

from the album Check Your Head
- B-side: "Honky Rink"
- Released: October 1992
- Recorded: 1991–1992
- Genre: Alternative rock; psychedelic rock; rap rock; stoner rock; punk rock
- Length: 2:45
- Label: Capitol
- Songwriters: Michael Diamond; Adam Horovitz; Adam Yauch; Tom Cushman
- Producer: Mario Caldato, Jr.

Beastie Boys singles chronology
"Jimmy James" (1992)	"Gratitude" (1992)	"Professor Booty" (1992)

Music video
- "Gratitude" on YouTube

"Gratitude" is a song by American rap rock group the Beastie Boys, from their third studio album Check Your Head. It was released in October 1992 as the fourth single for the album, primarily serviced to modern rock radio. The live version B-side was recorded in September 1992.

The bass guitar in the song uses a Univox Superfuzz. The song was included in the video game Guitar Hero 5.

== Music video ==
The music video to this song is a homage to the 1972 concert film Pink Floyd: Live at Pompeii and was recorded in Rotorua, New Zealand. The video was featured on Beavis and Butt-Head, who gave the song a positive review.

== Covers ==
After touring as the opening act for the Beastie Boys, the Rollins Band often interweaved their own version of "Gratitude" (with new lyrics improvised by Henry Rollins) into their live set during their 1992 tour.

Post-hardcore/punk band Refused covered this song on their Demos Collection.

Punk rock/hip-hop band the Transplants covered the song on their 2017 covers EP Take Cover.

== Track listing ==
1. "Gratitude" (LP version)
2. "Stand Together" (Live)
3. "Finger Lickin'" (Good Government Cheese Mix)
4. "Gratitude" (Live at Budokan)
5. "Honky Rink" (Previously Unreleased)
