= Triple Trouble (song) =

Single by Beastie Boys

from the album To the 5 Boroughs
- Released: September 2004
- Recorded: 2004
- Genre: Hip-hop
- Length: 2:43
- Label: EMI
- Songwriters: Nile Rodgers, Bernard Edwards, Michael Diamond, Adam Horovitz, Adam Yauch
- Producer: Beastie Boys

Beastie Boys singles chronology
"Ch-Check It Out" (2004)	"Triple Trouble" (2004)	"Right Right Now Now" (2004)

Music video
- "Triple Trouble" on YouTube

"Triple Trouble" is a song by the American hip-hop group Beastie Boys, released as the second single from their sixth studio album To the 5 Boroughs. It heavily samples "Rapper's Delight" by the Sugarhill Gang and interpolates lyrics from "Double Trouble at the Amphitheatre" by Double Trouble.

The music video for "Triple Trouble" was directed by MCA, under his alias Nathaniel Hörnblowér. The video was filmed in Toronto and Lower Manhattan, New York City. Kanye West and John Legend made cameos at the end of the video.

The song was used to promote the third season of the HBO series Bored to Death.

== Track listing ==
1. "Triple Trouble" (Album version) – 2:46
2. "Triple Trouble" (J Wizzle Remix) – 3:12
3. "Triple Trouble" (Graham Coxon Remix) – 3:59 (UK CD release)

== Chart positions ==
Chart (2004)	Peak position
Australia (ARIA)	73
Australian Urban (ARIA)	17
UK Singles (OCC)	37
US Billboard Modern Rock Tracks	11
