= Rock Band 2 =

2008 music video game

- Cover art
- Developer: Harmonix (Note: PlayStation 2 and Wii's version developed by Pi Studios.)
- Publisher: MTV Games
- Director: Josh Randall
- Producer: Michael Verrette
- Designers: Rob Kay; Dan Teasdale; Sylvain Dubrofsky; Casey Malone
- Programmers: Avida Michaud; Dan Schmidt; Eric Malafew
- Artists: Ryan Lesser; Peter A. MacDonald
- Series: Rock Band
- Platforms: Xbox 360, PlayStation 3, PlayStation 2, Wii
- Release: Xbox 360: NA: September 14, 2008; EU: October 19, 2008 (bundle); EU: November 21, 2008; PlayStation 3: NA: October 19, 2008; EU: March 27, 2009; PlayStation 2: NA: December 18, 2008; EU: March 27, 2009; Wii: NA: December 18, 2008; EU: October 9, 2009
- Genre: Rhythm
- Modes: Single-player, multiplayer

Rock Band 2 is a 2008 rhythm game developed by Harmonix, published by MTV Games, and distributed by Electronic Arts. It is the sequel to Rock Band (2007) and the second installment in the Rock Band series. The game allows up to four players to simulate the performance of popular songs by playing with controllers modeled after musical instruments. Players can play the lead guitar, bass guitar, and drums parts to songs with "instrument controllers", as well as sing through a USB microphone. Players are scored on their ability to match scrolling musical "notes" while playing instruments, or by their ability to match the singer's pitch on vocals.

Rock Band 2 features improved drum and guitar controllers, while supporting older controllers, as well. New features include a "Drum Trainer" mode, a "Battle of the Bands" mode, online capabilities for "World Tour" mode, and merchandising opportunities for the players' virtual bands. In addition to the 84 songs included on the game disc and 20 free downloadable songs, over 1400 additional downloadable songs have been released for the Xbox 360, Wii, and PlayStation 3 versions, with more added each week. All of these songs, existing and future, are compatible with all Rock Band titles.

Rock Band 2 software was released in North America for the Xbox 360 on September 14, 2008, along with individual instrument peripherals, and later for the PlayStation 3 on October 19, 2008. The software/hardware bundles for the Xbox 360 and PlayStation 3 were made available on October 19, 2008. Versions of the game for the PlayStation 2 and Wii platforms were released on December 18, 2008. Rock Band 2 received highly positive reviews from critics upon release and sold 1.7 million copies through the end of 2008. Rock Band 2 is considered to be one of the greatest games of all time according to critics.

== Gameplay ==
The core gameplay in Rock Band 2 is mostly unchanged from the original Rock Band. Players use controllers modeled after musical instruments to simulate the performance of rock songs. Players use these instruments to play scrolling musical "notes" on-screen in time with the music. Rock Band 2 offers single-player and multiplayer gameplay for lead guitar, bass guitar, drums, and vocals, allowing for any combination of parts to play as a band.

During song performances, the game displays up to three tracks of vertically scrolling colored music notes, one section each for lead guitar, drums, and bass. The colored notes on-screen correspond to buttons on the guitar and drum peripherals. For lead and bass guitar, players play their notes by holding down colored fret buttons on the guitar peripheral and pushing the controller's strum bar; for drums, players must strike the matching colored drumhead, or step on the pedal to simulate playing bass drum notes. Along the top of the screen is the vocals display, which scrolls horizontally. The lyrics display beneath green bars, which represent the pitch of the individual vocal elements. When singing vocals, the player must sing in relative pitch to the original vocals. A pitch indicator displays the singer's accuracy relative to the original pitch. The remainder of the screen is used to display the band's virtual characters as they perform in concert.

A screenshot of a full band playing Lush's "De-Luxe" in Rock Band 2. Each instrument is represented by a different interface: lead guitar (left), drums (middle), bass guitar (right), vocals (top). The Band Meter (green meter on left) measures the performance of each band member, while the Energy Meter (gold meter beneath each interface) tracks each player's Overdrive.

During cooperative play as a band, all players earn points towards a common score, though score multipliers and "Overdrive" are tracked separately for each player. Overdrive is individually collected by players during select portions of a song by successfully playing all white notes (or yellow notes for vocals) within that section (or by using the guitar controller's whammy bar during white sustained notes). Once a player's Energy Meter is filled halfway, they can deploy their Overdrive, resulting in the "Band Meter" (which tracks how well each player is doing) changing more dramatically. This allows players to strategically use Overdrive to raise the Band Meter and pass portions of a song they otherwise might have failed. Overdrive can be used to activate score multipliers, which vary based on a player's note streak. Players can deploy Overdrive independently of each other, as well as collect additional Overdrive while it is deployed and draining.

Each band member can choose the difficulty at which they play (spanning Easy, Medium, Hard, and Expert). If a player does not play well enough and falls to the bottom of the Band Meter, they will fail out of the song and their instrument will be muted from the audio mix. However, any active player can activate their Overdrive to bring failed players back into the song, "saving" the band member. However, a band member can only be saved twice; after the third failure, they cannot be brought back for that song. Failed players continuously drag the band's Band Meter down until they are saved. If the player is not saved before the Band Meter reaches the bottom, the band fails the song. Players can earn Overdrive bonuses from "Unison Phrases" and extra points from a "Big Rock Ending."

=== Instrument peripherals ===
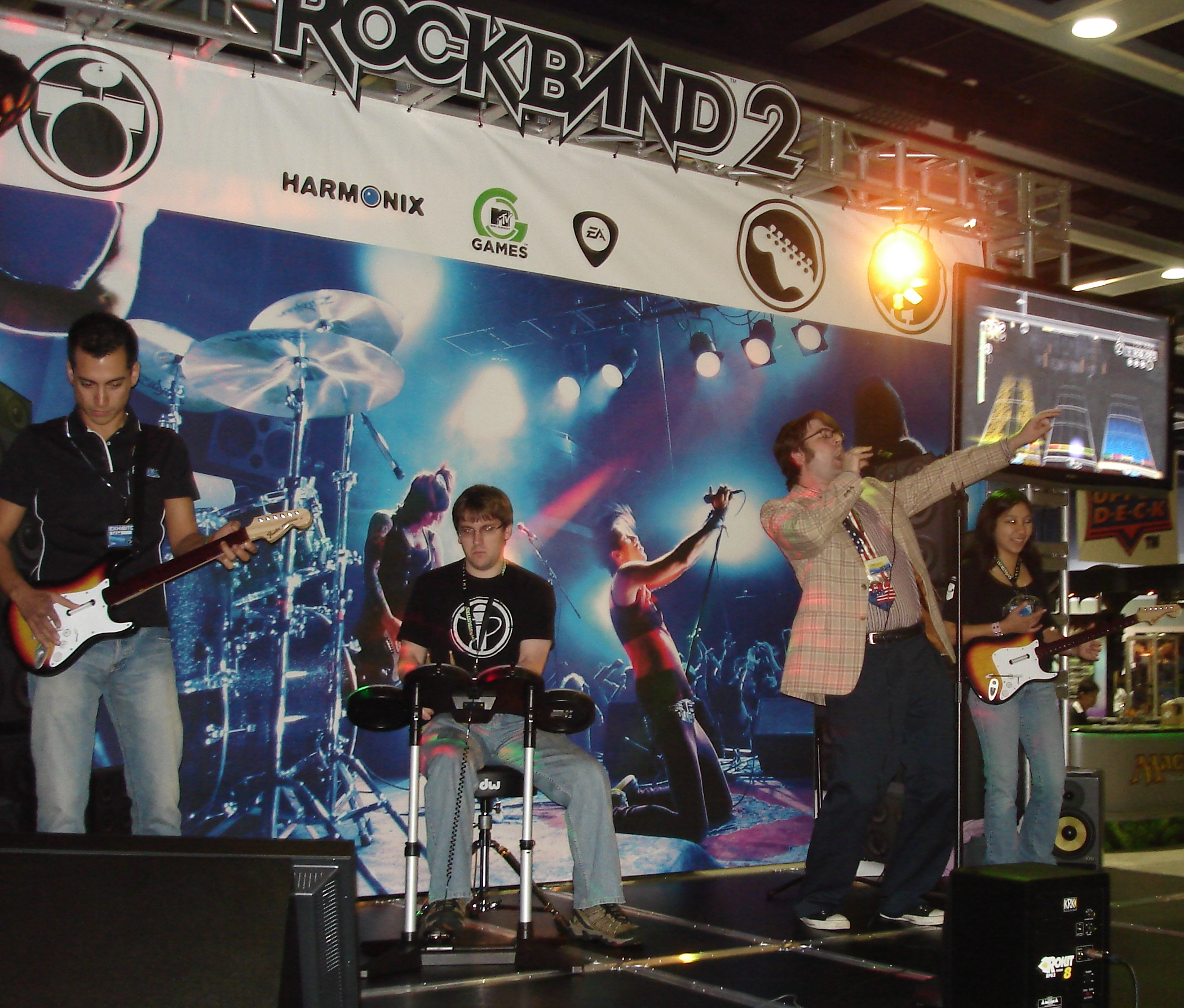
Four people play on the Rock Band 2 stage at the Penny Arcade Expo in Seattle, August 29, 2008.

All of the original Rock Band peripherals are compatible with Rock Band 2 for the same console. Similarly, the newly designed peripherals for Rock Band 2 are backwards compatible with the original Rock Band.

The game features Rock Band 2-branded guitar controllers modeled after the Fender Stratocaster. The guitar is nearly identical to the original Rock Band Stratocaster in terms of gameplay, featuring ten colored fret buttons, a strum bar, a whammy bar, and an effects switch. Improvements to the new guitar include a sunburst paint job, a more reliable strum bar and Overdrive accelerometer, a self-timing calibration, and quieter fret buttons. The bass drum pedal from the drum set can also be used with the guitar to activate Overdrive mode.

The bundled drum controller is also similar to the one featured in the original Rock Band. It features four rubber drum pads and a kick pedal. New improvements include velocity-sensitive drum pads (the force of the drum hits will dictate the in-game volume) with more rebound and less noise, a metal-reinforced kick pedal, expansion plugs for separately sold cymbals manufactured by Mad Catz, and wireless capabilities.

Rock Band 2's USB microphone instrument is identical to the microphone from the original game. Singers are judged by pitch, or during "talking parts", their ability to enunciate spoken vocals. The phoneme detection system used for atonal vocal parts has been completely replaced with a new, more lenient engine, and songs imported from Rock Band and pre-existing downloadable content will be converted to use the new phoneme system.

Harmonix and MTV Games have also provided limited edition instruments, including an authentic Fender Squier Stratocaster guitar and Precision Bass retrofitted with the game's input controls by Mad Catz. Additionally, Ion Audio is selling a "Premium Drum Kit" that not only works within Rock Band 2, but can also be expanded into an electronic drum kit through the purchase of a separately sold drum brain. The "Premium Drum Kit" features four drum pads, two cymbal pads (with the option of a third), and a bass pedal.

The Rock Band 2 peripherals and Guitar Hero World Tour peripherals are cross-compatible with other music games on the Xbox 360 and PlayStation 3. Sony originally announced that instrument peripherals would be universally compatible on the PlayStation 3; and on November 24, 2008, a patch was released to allow the Guitar Hero: World Tour drums to be properly recognized by Rock Band 2. Microsoft has also stated that instruments on the Xbox 360 will be compatible between the two games, as well as Rock Revolution. The Wii edition of Rock Band 2 is compatible with the Wii drums and guitar for Rock Band and Guitar Hero World Tour as well as the guitar for Guitar Hero III. Rock Band 2 drum and guitar peripherals do not work with Wii Guitar Hero games prior to Guitar Hero 5, although the microphone does.

=== Tour mode ===
Unlike Rock Band, which segregated the single-player Solo Tour mode and the multiplayer Band World Tour mode, Rock Band 2 features a single "Tour" mode that makes no distinction of the number of players. Any combination of 1–4 players, both online and local, can create a band composed of the player(s)' virtual characters. A band leader is no longer necessary, allowing the characters within the band lineup to change at will, as well as swap instruments. The band must also select a name and hometown before proceeding to their "practice space". From here, the band can choose to "Start Tour", undertake "Tour Challenges", or compete with other bands in "Battle of the Bands."

If the band chooses to "Start Tour", they will enter the game's equivalent of the original Rock Band's Band World Tour mode, allowing the band to play gigs and tour a virtual representation of the world. Once setup is complete, the band can begin playing concerts in small venues in their hometown until they unlock vans, tour buses and private jets, which unlock more cities and different continents. Unlocking and completing new gigs unlocks additional songs for play across all game modes. Successful performances also earn the band fans, stars, and in-game cash. Most cities and larger venues require the band to achieve a certain number of fans and stars before they are unlocked. The band must complete unique sets of activities at each venue. Performances consist of single songs, multiple song sets, "make your own" setlists, and mystery setlists. For certain performances, bands are faced with an optional challenge that requires the band to average a certain number of stars for their gig in order to reap the rewards. Bands can also hire personnel, including band managers, roadies, and sound guys.

The second option from the band's "practice space" is "Tour Challenge", which is a set of non-linear challenges. Some of these challenges include completing certain band-specific setlists, sets of songs that are difficult on a particular instrument, or songs all with a common theme. New downloadable songs will be integrated into this mode, allowing the creation of new challenges. Players can save their progress through these setlists and complete them at a later time. Newly purchased songs that will extend the length of a Tour Challenge setlist will also need to be completed in order for the challenge to be completed.

The final option from the band's "practice space" is "Battle of the Bands", only available for the Xbox 360, PlayStation 3, and Wii versions of the game. This mode allows the band to virtually compete against other bands via online scoreboard tracking. This mode is composed of limited-time online tournaments created by Harmonix, with approximately five to ten challenges available any time. Challenges may be made up of one or more songs, and may be geared to one instrument or a full band. The songs will not be limited to those on the Rock Band 2 disc and will include ones that use songs off the Rock Band disc and downloaded content; it is expected that challenges centered around downloadable albums will also be made available. Challenges may also provide special rules, such as turning on the "no fail" mode for a difficult guitar song, or completing a song without activating "Overdrive". While playing the challenge, the band will see the score of the next highest band from the online leaderboard, as well as a "tug of war" meter to show how close they are to the score. If a band's score is surpassed, they will be notified the next time they are online. Challenges participated in and the corresponding scores will be tracked as part of the band's history, with this information also being made available through the game's website.

Unlike the original Rock Band, players can designate custom characters as "stand-in musicians" for their band members on a specific instrument, which will appear when the instrument in question has no player instead of a random preset character made by Harmonix.

=== Other modes ===
Also included in Rock Band 2 is a "Training" mode, which will help players learn how to play each instrument. Within this mode is the "Drum Trainer", which will help players improve on the drums through a "Beat Trainer" (with dozens of drum beats to practice), "Fill Trainer" (which will teach players how to perform better drum fills), and a "Freestyle Mode" (which will allow player to freeplay the drums, or play over MP3 songs on their Xbox 360 or PlayStation 3 console). The "Extras" menu of the game allows "modifiers" to be activated; some of these include "No Fail Mode", which will allow playing through songs without anyone being able to fail, and a "Breakneck Speed" mode, similar to the Hyperspeed mode in Guitar Hero III: Legends of Rock which doubles the track's scrolling speed. The "Score Duel", "Tug of War", "Quickplay", and "Tutorial" modes from the original Rock Band are also retained.

=== Customization ===
In Quickplay modes, players can assemble variable-length custom setlists, allowing multiple songs to be played in sequence without returning to the song selection menu in between each song. As with the original Rock Band, players can create and customize their own in-game character, complete with adjustable hair, body physique, clothing, tattoos, piercings, onstage movements, and instruments. Using cash earned within the game, the player may purchase items at the in-game "Rock Shop", with which they can customize their rock star. The game features an art maker where players can combine different clip art elements to create custom face paint, tattoos, clothing designs, instrument artwork, and band logos. The same character is usable to play any of the instruments in the game, unlike in Rock Band where a character was fixed to one specific instrument. Players' characters created in the first Rock Band cannot be transferred to Rock Band 2, although all of the customization options from Rock Band are present, allowing characters to be recreated. The Wii version has character customization as well, though features like custom tattoos, face paint, body paint, make-up, and instrument art are not included an upgrade from the Wii version of Rock Band, which used pre-rendered video. The PlayStation 2 version uses aforementioned pre-rendered video.

Before the Rock Band website was redesigned for the release of Rock Band 3, players were able to interact with their virtual characters and band on the game's website. Using the website's "Photo Booth", users were able simulate a photo shoot by posing their characters, choosing a backdrop, and applying visual effects. Any pictures taken could be used to order custom merchandise, including T-shirts, posters, keychains, and stickers; however, this service was discontinued on March 30, 2010. Additionally, the Merch Booth allowed users to purchase figurines modeled after their characters. The six-inch-tall figurines were created by the Z Corporation using 3D printing techniques, and cost $70.

== Development ==
A sequel to Rock Band had been reported as in development for release in late 2008 in a Wired blog by Chris Kohler. According to Kohler, Harmonix was working on improving the instrument controllers, but the current controllers would be forward compatible with Rock Band 2. Kohler's piece also stated that the game would likely include similar features as announced for Guitar Hero World Tour, also planned for release in late 2008.

According to lead designer Dan Teasdale from Harmonix, the game includes many features that players have been asking for, including "first time ever" features. Band World Tour mode allows the use of downloadable content, in addition to on-disc tracks, and there are several new solo play modes that "not only provide new ways for you to experience your music library, but also new ways for you to make the transition from Expert to real instruments".

Eric Brosius, Harmonix's Audio Director, described the process of selecting songs for Rock Band 2 as organic, allowing the set list to grow as needed with influence from fans' reaction to the first game but without any specific vision of the final list, and knowing that tracks that failed to make the main disc content would end up as content for download. The team often licensed several songs from a single group, and then selected one that would be the most satisfying for all players in the game; additional songs not used in the main set list will likely appear as downloadable content in the future, though the initial twenty songs to be made available immediately after Rock Band 2's release featured new bands. The final setlist features songs with harder drum and vocal parts compared to Rock Band, in consideration that a "second generation" of players now exist who are familiar with the instruments on the first Rock Band. Songs were censored where necessary to achieve the desired game ratings; however, the team did not alter songs that had suggestive themes. Brosius stated that the inclusion of Guns N' Roses' "Shackler's Revenge" was due to the team knowing they wanted a Guns N' Roses song, then determining that they wanted one off the "mysterious" Chinese Democracy album; Axl Rose helped the team to select the specific song.

While a "Jukebox Mode" was originally planned, which would have allowed players to simply listen to the music and watch their band perform without interacting with the game, Harmonix stated that it was removed in the final stages of development, and that there are no plans to add it back to the game. However, an equivalent experience can be "activated" through the use of several in-game modifiers.

Rock Band 2 was officially announced by EA Games on June 30, 2008, and was presented at the 2008 E3 conference. The game premiered exclusively on the Xbox 360 on September 14, 2008, as a result of a marketing agreement with Microsoft. All other versions of the game, including the PlayStation 3 and Wii versions, were released later in the year. The PlayStation 3 version supports Trophies. The Wii version of Rock Band 2 was promised to be a "more competitive product" compared with the Wii version of Rock Band, as stated by Wired's Chris Kohler after speaking with Harmonix at the E3 conference. The Wii version supports downloadable content and the same multiplayer modes as the Xbox 360 and PlayStation 3 version. The PlayStation 2 version does not have these features.

=== Editions ===
Special Edition bundle
	Xbox 360	PlayStation 3	PlayStation 2	Wii
Release date (US)	October 19, 2008	October 19, 2008	N/A	December 18, 2008
Release date (Europe)	Unknown	Unknown	Unknown	Unknown
Standalone software
	Xbox 360	PlayStation 3	PlayStation 2	Wii
Release date (US)	September 14, 2008	October 19, 2008	December 18, 2008	December 18, 2008
Release date (Europe)	November 14, 2008	March 27, 2009	March 27, 2009	October 8, 2009
Standalone instruments
	Xbox 360	PlayStation 3	PlayStation 2	Wii
Release date (US)	September 14, 2008	October 19, 2008	October 19, 2008	December 18, 2008
Release date (Europe)	Unknown	Unknown	Unknown	Unknown

The release of Rock Band 2 was originally exclusive to the Xbox 360 console for a one-month period. The game software and individual instruments were made available on September 14, 2008. The "Special Edition" bundle packaging the game software and peripherals was released on October 19, 2008, when the PlayStation 3 version of the game software was released.

=== Promotion ===
A special Rock Band 2 premiere event at the 2008 E3 conference was held on July 16, 2008, featuring a performance by surprise special guest The Who, in conjunction with the release of "The Best of The Who" pack as downloadable content. A "Rock Band Live" concert tour toured North America in October and November 2008, and featured bands such as Panic! at the Disco, Dashboard Confessional, Plain White T's and The Cab, as well as local acts selected by radio promotions, contests, and on-site at each show. All acts featured during the tour included songs available as downloadable content for the game prior to the tour. Mark Burnett, along with MTV, sponsored an "Ultimate Rock Band Experience" in Los Angeles, California, for the launch of Rock Band 2, offering the chance for any four-member set of players to participate in the competition; it was speculated that this would be the basis for a new reality television show, although no such show was produced. An early public showing/demo of Rock Band 2 attended by lead designer Dan Teasdale and other Harmonix Music Systems personnel took place on September 2, 2008, at Ground Kontrol, a video arcade in Portland, Oregon, that puts on weekly "Rock Band Tuesdays" events.

== Soundtrack ==
The full set list for on-disc material was announced on July 14, 2008, during E3. All 84 tracks included with the Rock Band 2 game disc utilize the songs' master recordings; 75 of these are featured tracks in the main setlist, while the other 9 tracks are "bonus songs" by independent or lesser-known bands, as well as bands made up of Harmonix employees. Featured songs include "Ace of Spades" by Motörhead, "Any Way You Want It" by Journey, "Everlong" by Foo Fighters, "Let There Be Rock" by AC/DC, "My Own Worst Enemy" by Lit, "Pinball Wizard" by The Who, "Psycho Killer" by Talking Heads, "Spoonman" by Soundgarden, and "White Wedding" by Billy Idol. The song "Shackler's Revenge" from the long-delayed Guns N' Roses album Chinese Democracy is part of the soundtrack, and signalled the eventual release of the album, which occurred in November 2008. The full album was later released for the Rock Band series as downloadable content.

Additionally, 55 of the 58 songs from the original Rock Band game disc can be exported to the player's console hard drive and used within Rock Band 2. The disc export feature was made available on the Xbox 360 version of the original Rock Band via a title update on September 4, 2008, with a cost of 400 MS Points (US$4.99) required to purchase a transfer license. This feature is also available for PlayStation 3 owners, however, there are presently no plans for Wii owners to do the same. Three songs from Rock Band are not transferable: "Enter Sandman" by Metallica, "Run to the Hills" as made famous by Iron Maiden, and "Paranoid" as made famous by Black Sabbath are unavailable for transfer in all versions of Rock Band, and "Monsoon" by Tokio Hotel is non-transferable in the European release of Rock Band. Each Rock Band song had to be relicensed for use within Rock Band 2.

The majority of Rock Band 2 songs on-disc can be exported for use in Rock Band 3 for a nominal fee using a code on the back of the game's manual. Nine of the songs by bands fronted by Harmonix employees were not exportable; however, the songs were released as free DLC on January 4, 2011. Five other songs—"Let There Be Rock" by AC/DC, "Any Way You Want It" by Journey, "Battery" by Metallica, "Give It Away" by Red Hot Chili Peppers, and "Spoonman" by Soundgarden—are not exportable (however, "Spoonman" and "Give it Away" are included in the soundtrack for Rock Band Blitz, which also allows the music to be used in Rock Band 3; both songs were eventually released as individual downloads, along with the remainder of Blitz's setlist).

=== Downloadable songs and Track Packs ===
For the PlayStation 3, Wii, and Xbox 360 versions of the game, players can download additional songs on a track-by-track basis, with many of the tracks digitally bundled together in "song packs" or complete albums at a discounted rate. All existing and forthcoming downloadable songs are cross-compatible between both Rock Band titles. Unlike Rock Band, the Wii version of Rock Band 2 supports downloadable content, and all existing downloadable content will be made available to Wii users over time. Harmonix stated that 30 existing songs would be available at the game's Wii launch, but on December 24, 2008, issued a statement that the launch of the Wii music store will be delayed until early 2009. DLC finally became available for the Wii on January 13, 2009, with 50 tracks available at launch. Songs can be stored to both the Wii's internal memory and to an SD card, and songs on the SD card will be streamed off the card. To promote Rock Band 2, 20 free downloadable songs were released soon after the game's launch. As of November 24, 2009, there are now over 1,000 songs available on disc and for download in the Rock Band Music Store for all consoles.

Harmonix is also releasing a series of "Track Pack" standalone games that are sold in retail stores. Each volume contains several tracks available as downloadable content. Seven track packs have been released so far. All "Track Packs" except the first (due to the limitations of the PlayStation 2 and Wii) allow their track listings to be exported to the player's console hard drive for use in any main Rock Band game.

Support for new downloadable content ended with the launch of Rock Band 3 on October 26, 2010, due to changes in the songs' file format. Content released prior to that date can still be purchased from the in-game store.

=== Rock Band Network ===
The Rock Band Network is a downloadable content service designed by Harmonix Music Systems with the help of Microsoft to allow musical artists and record labels to make their music available as playable tracks for the Rock Band series of rhythm video games, starting with Rock Band 2. It was designed to allow more music to be incorporated into Rock Band than Harmonix themselves could produce for the games, and it is seen as a way to further expand the games' music catalog into a wide variety of genres. The Network started closed beta testing in September 2009, and an open beta test in January 2010.

The Xbox 360 and PlayStation 3 versions of Rock Band 2 received a title update in late 2009 to add support for the Rock Band Network. The Rock Band Network store was launched on March 4, 2010, for the Xbox 360 for users in US, Canada, UK, France, Italy, Germany, Spain, Sweden, and Singapore. Xbox 360 users are able to download free demos of songs, lasting for either 60 seconds or 1/3 of the song's length, whichever is shorter. Songs are exclusive to Xbox Live for 30 days, after which they can be ported to the PlayStation 3 or Wii. The RBN store for the PlayStation 3 was launched on April 22, 2010, with 5 songs added weekly.

Support for the Wii began on September 21, 2010, with 6 to 10 songs added each week. RBN songs were directly released to the in-game music store on the Wii since the console does not support title patches. Support for the Wii platform ended on January 18, 2011, due to Nintendo's small online install base, limited demand for the songs and the significant amount of work needed to port songs to the Wii.

Rock Band Network support for Rock Band 2 ended when RBN 2.0 went live, and the prior version of the RBN was shut down. Support for the Xbox 360 ended on February 15, 2011, with ports to the PlayStation 3 platform ending on June 14, 2011. Like Harmonix-authored content, this is because of changes in the song file format to include support for standard and pro keyboard tracks, pro drums, and harmony vocals. RBN 1.0 songs can still be played in Rock Band 2.

== Reception ==
Reception

Aggregate scores
Aggregator	Score
GameRankings	92.25%
Metacritic	92/100

Review scores
Publication	Score
1Up.com	A−
Game Informer	9.25/10
GameSpot	8.5/10
GameTrailers	9.2/10
IGN	9.0/10
Nintendo Power	9.0/10
Official Xbox Magazine (US)	9.0/10
X-Play	5/5
Wired	9/10

Awards
Publication	Award
GameSpot	Best Rhythm/Music Game (2008)
GameTrailers	Best Multiplayer Game (2008)
IGN	Best Xbox 360 Music/Rhythm Game (2008)
IGN	Best PS3 Music/Rhythm Game (2008)
IGN	Best Family Game (Xbox 360) (2008)
IGN	Best Local Multiplayer Game (Xbox 360) (2008)
Spike Video Game Awards	Best Music Game (2008)
Spike Video Game Awards	Best Soundtrack (2008)
X-Play	Music/Rhythm Game of the Year (2008)
Academy of Interactive Arts & Sciences	Outstanding Achievement in Soundtrack (2008)

Rock Band 2, like its predecessor, was met with critical acclaim. 1UP.com likened it to a "system update" rather than an entirely new game, describing it as "a collection of interface tweaks and non-earth-shattering new features designed to make the Rock Band experience more enjoyable and less frustrating". The "No Fail" mode has been recognized as a very useful feature for balancing the skill levels of players at different levels, particularly inexperienced players.

The Xbox 360 version of Rock Band 2 was the third best-selling game in North America during September 2008, selling 363,000 copies. and also has an average critic review score of 92% on Metacritic, tying it for the 11th highest-rated game for the Xbox 360 and the 7th highest-rated game on the PlayStation 3. The Xbox 360 version continued to sell more than 119,000 copies in October 2008, while a similar number of units were sold of the PlayStation 3 version following its October debut. Rock Band 2 sold 1.7 million units across all platforms in North America in 2008, about half as many as Guitar Hero World Tour.

IGN praised the Wii version for including features like online play and downloadable content that were missing from the platform's edition of the first Rock Band, saying "the sequel more than makes up for the original's problems."

Game Informer considered Rock Band 2 their "Game of the Month" when it was released, and went on to include it in their list of "The Top 50 Games of 2008" and then in their list of the 200 best games of all time.

During the 12th Annual Interactive Achievement Awards, the Academy of Interactive Arts & Sciences awarded Rock Band 2 with "Outstanding Achievement in Soundtrack", along with receiving nominations for "Family Game of the Year" and "Outstanding Achievement in Online Gameplay".
