= Ch-Check It Out =

2004 single by Beastie Boys

Single by Beastie Boys

from the album To the 5 Boroughs
- B-side: "And Then I"
- Released: May 3, 2004
- Studio: Oscilloscope Laboratories (New York City)
- Length: 3:12 (album version); 3:10 (single version)
- Label: Capitol; Parlophone
- Songwriters: Michael Diamond; Adam Horovitz; Adam Yauch
- Producer: Beastie Boys

Beastie Boys singles chronology
"Alive" (1999)	"Ch-Check It Out" (2004)	"Triple Trouble" (2004)

Music video
- "Ch-Check It Out" on YouTube

"Ch-Check It Out" is a song by American alternative hip-hop group Beastie Boys, released as the first single off their sixth studio album, To the 5 Boroughs (2004), on May 3, 2004. The song heavily samples "(Sittin' On) The Dock of the Bay" by Peggy Lee. Following its appearance on the season one episode "The Strip" of the American teen drama television series The O.C. in April 2004, the song was released as a single on May 3, 2004.

The song reached number one on the US Billboard Modern Rock Tracks chart and number 68 on the Billboard Hot 100. It also peaked at number eight on the UK Singles Chart and number one on the Canadian Singles Chart. In Australia, the song reached number 46 on the ARIA Singles Chart and was ranked number 28 on Triple J's Hottest 100 of 2004. "Ch-Check It Out" was nominated for Best Rap Performance by a Duo or Group at the 47th Annual Grammy Awards. Beastie Boys member MCA directed the song's music video under his pseudonym, Nathaniel Hörnblowér.

== Critical reception ==
Reviewing "Ch-Check It Out" for Billboard, Susanne Ault wrote that "Ch-Check It Out" harkens back to the Beastie Boys' past works, calling the track "a bit retro" as well as its horns and bassline "much fun", comparing the chorus to the group's 1992 single "So What'cha Want". She went on to comment, "Still, with so many hits in their stable, it seems near impossible for the Beastie Boys not to compete with themselves with each successive track."

== Music video ==
MCA directed the music video for the song under his pseudonym, Nathaniel Hörnblowér. It features the Beastie Boys performing the song while dressed in various costumes. The video was added to the playlists of MTV and MuchMusic on the week ending May 2, 2004, and to Fuse's playlist two weeks later, on May 16.

== Live performances ==
The Beastie Boys performed the song live on The Late Show with David Letterman. This performance was unusual, as it featured the Beastie Boys performing the song while on their way to the studio. They began by emerging from a subway stop and walking through New York City until arriving at the Letterman studio and finishing the track inside. This performance has been regarded as one of the best musical moments on the program, with Paste magazine ranking it number 11 on their list of "David Letterman's 25 Greatest Music Moments".

== Track listings ==
Canadian and Australian CD single

1. "Ch-Check It Out"
2. "Ch-Check It Out" (instrumental)
3. "And Then I"

UK CD1

1. "Ch-Check It Out"
2. "Ch-Check It Out" (Just Blaze remix)

UK CD2

1. "Ch-Check It Out"
2. "Ch-Check It Out" (instrumental)
3. "And Then I"
4. "Ch-Check It Out" (video)

UK 12-inch single

A1. "Ch-Check It Out"
A2. "Ch-Check It Out" (instrumental)
B1. "Ch-Check It Out" (Just Blaze remix)
B2. "Ch-Check It Out" (a cappella)

Japanese maxi-CD single

1. "Ch-Check It Out" (explicit version)
2. "And Then I"
3. "Ch-Check It Out" (Just Blaze remix)
4. "Ch-Check It Out" (instrumental)
5. "Ch-Check It Out" (explicit a cappella)

== Credits and personnel ==
Credits are adapted from the UK CD1 liner notes.

Studio

- Recorded and mixed at Oscilloscope Laboratories (New York City)

Personnel

- Beastie Boys – writing, vocals, production, engineering
- MixMasterMike – "turntable extraordinaire"
- Supa Engineer "DURO" – mixing
- Jon Weiner – engineering
- Freddie – assistant to the regional manager
- Piero Ribelli – photography
- Noel Yauch – illustration

== Charts ==
=== Weekly charts ===
Weekly chart performance for "Ch-Check It Out"
Chart (2004)	Peak position
Australia (ARIA)	46
Australian Urban (ARIA)	17
Austria (Ö3 Austria Top 40)	75
Belgium (Ultratip Bubbling Under Wallonia)	16
Canada (Nielsen SoundScan)	1
Canada Rock Top 30 (Radio & Records)	27
Denmark (Tracklisten)	16
France (SNEP)	82
Germany (GfK)	65
Ireland (IRMA)	29
Italy (FIMI)	13
Netherlands (Dutch Top 40 Tipparade)	5
Netherlands (Single Top 100)	21
New Zealand (Recorded Music NZ)	31
Norway (VG-lista)	17
Scottish Singles Sales (Official Charts)	10
Spain (Promusicae)	8
Sweden (Sverigetopplistan)	38
Switzerland (Schweizer Hitparade)	36
UK Singles (Official Charts)	8
UK Hip Hop/R&B (Official Charts)	3
US Billboard Hot 100	68
US Alternative Airplay (Billboard)	1

=== Year-end charts ===
Year-end chart performance for "Ch-Check It Out"
Chart (2004)	Position
UK Singles (OCC)	180
US Modern Rock Tracks (Billboard)	35

== Certifications ==
Certifications for "Ch-Check It Out"
Region	Certification	Certified units/sales
United States (RIAA)	Gold	500,000^{^}
^{^} Shipments figures based on certification alone.

== Release history ==
Release dates and formats for "Ch-Check It Out"
Region	Date	Format(s)	Label(s)	Ref.
United States	May 3, 2004	Rhythmic contemporary; urban; active rock; alternative radio	Capitol	
United Kingdom	May 31, 2004	12-inch vinyl; CD	Parlophone	
Australia	June 7, 2004	CD	Capitol	
United States	June 8, 2004	Contemporary hit radio	Capitol	
Japan	June 16, 2004	CD	Capitol	
