= To the 5 Boroughs =

2004 studio album by Beastie Boys

Studio album by Beastie Boys
- Released: June 15, 2004
- Recorded: February 2003 – March 2004
- Studios: Oscilloscope Laboratories, Tribeca, New York City
- Genre: Hip-hop
- Length: 44:37
- Label: Capitol
- Producer: Beastie Boys

Beastie Boys chronology
Beastie Boys Anthology: The Sounds of Science (1999)	To the 5 Boroughs (2004)	Solid Gold Hits (2005)

Singles from To the 5 Boroughs
- 1. "Ch-Check It Out" Released: March 2004; 2. "Triple Trouble" Released: September 2004; 3. "Right Right Now Now" Released: 2004; 4. "An Open Letter to NYC" Released: November 2004

To the 5 Boroughs is the sixth studio album by the American hip-hop group Beastie Boys, released on June 14, 2004, internationally, and a day later in the United States. It sold 360,000 copies in its first week of release, becoming the group's third consecutive album to debut at number one on the Billboard 200, and has been certified Platinum by the Recording Industry Association of America for sales of over 1,000,000 copies in the U.S. The album is the first major Beastie Boys release since 1998's Hello Nasty, and it reflects on the aftermath of the September 11 attacks on New York City.

The album was nominated for a Grammy Award for Best Rap Album at the 47th Grammy Awards, losing to Kanye West's The College Dropout.

== Release and promotion ==
The album's lead single "Ch-Check It Out" debuted on The O.C. in "The Strip" from Season 1, airing on April 28, 2004. The album was the cause of some controversy with allegations that it installed spyware when inserted into the CD-ROM of a computer. The band has denied this allegation saying there is no copy protection software on the albums sold in the U.S. and in the U.K. While there is Macrovision CDS-200 copy protection software installed on European copies of the album, this is standard practice for all European releases on EMI/Capitol Records released in Europe and it does not install spyware or any form of permanent software.

== Singles ==
The album's first single "Ch-Check It Out" was released on April 28, 2004. The album's second single "Triple Trouble" was released in July 2004. The album's third single "Right Right Now Now" was released in 2004. The album's fourth single "An Open Letter to NYC" was released in November 2004.

== Critical reception ==
Professional ratings
Aggregate scores
Source	Rating
Metacritic	71/100
Review scores
Source	Rating
AllMusic	4/5 stars
Entertainment Weekly	B+
The Guardian	3/5 stars
Los Angeles Times	2.5/4 stars
NME	8/10
Pitchfork	7.9/10
Q	3/5 stars
Rolling Stone	5/5 stars
Uncut	4/5 stars
The Village Voice	A−

According to the review aggregator Metacritic, To the 5 Boroughs received "generally favorable reviews" based on a weighted average score of 71 out of 100 from 25 critic scores. Playlouder said "To the 5 Boroughs is a triumph." Rolling Stone said "To the 5 Boroughs is an exciting, astonishing balancing act: fast, funny and sobering." Jason Thompson of PopMatters called To the 5 Boroughs "their best album since Paul's Boutique". Tom Sinclair of Entertainment Weekly wrote, "The beats are[...] simple and effective, with a welcome lack of bells and whistles that made Hello Nasty so distracting." AllMusic said: "It's rather impressive that they're maturing gracefully turning into expert craftsmen who can deliver a satisfying listen like this". The NME said: "Like Missy Elliott, the Beasties are re-examining hip hop—what it was, what it is, what it can be". The Onion AV Club said: "With To the 5 Boroughs, Beastie Boys' members discover a musical entryway to an earlier, more innocent era, affording listeners the exuberance of youth along with the hard-won wisdom that can only come with experience." E! Online rated the album as a B− saying it was "fun but hardly fresh".

== Track listing ==
All tracks are written by Beastie Boys except where noted.

To the 5 Boroughs track listing
No.	Title	Writer(s)	Length
1.	"Ch-Check It Out"		3:12
2.	"Right Right Now Now"	Beastie Boys; Tony Romeo	2:46
3.	"3 the Hard Way"		2:48
4.	"It Takes Time to Build"		3:11
5.	"Rhyme the Rhyme Well"		2:47
6.	"Triple Trouble"	Beastie Boys; Bernard Edwards; Nile Rodgers	2:43
7.	"Hey Fuck You"		2:21
8.	"Oh Word?"		2:59
9.	"That's It That's All"		2:28
10.	"All Lifestyles"		2:33
11.	"Shazam!"	Beastie Boys; Robert Bell; Ronald Bell; George Brown; Claydes Smith; Dennis Thomas	2:26
12.	"An Open Letter to NYC"	Beastie Boys; Stiv Bators; Johnny Blitz; Cheetah Chrome; Jeff Magnum; David Thomas; Jimmy Zero	4:18
13.	"Crawlspace"		2:53
14.	"The Brouhaha"		2:13
15.	"We Got The"		2:27
16.	"Now Get Busy" (Japan bonus track)		2:25

Australian 2CD Tour Edition bonus disc
No.	Title	Length
1.	"An Open Letter to NYC"
2.	"Rizzle Rizzle Nizzle Nizzle" (Remix for "Right Right Now Now")
3.	"MTL Reppin for the 514" (Remix for "Right Right Now Now")
4.	"Sabotage" (Live)
5.	"Brr Stick Em"

Sample credits

- "Right Right Now Now":
  - contains a sample from "The Devil Rides in Jericho"; written by Don Costa, Martin Rackin, and Philip Zeller; performed by Don Costa.
  - embodies a portion of "I Would Have Loved You Anyway", written by Tony Romeo, performed by The Partridge Family.
- "3 the Hard Way" contains a sample from the album Radio, performed by LL Cool J.
- "Rhyme the Rhyme Well" contains a sample of the voice of Chuck D of Public Enemy.
- "Triple Trouble":
  - contains elements that were inspired by the lyrics from "Double Trouble at the Amphitheatre", written by Kevin Smith and Rodney Stone.
  - contains elements from "Rapper's Delight", written by Bernard Edwards and Nile Rodgers, performed by The Sugar Hill Gang.
- "Hey Fuck You":
  - contains a sample from "Bellevue Patient", performed by Funkmaster Wizard Wiz.
  - contains a sample from "The Symphony"; written by Marlon Williams, Masta Ace, Craig Curry, Antonio Hardy, Kool G Rap, and Little Daddy Shane; performed by Marley Marl featuring Masta Ace, Craig G, Kool G Rap, and Big Daddy Kane.
- "That's It That's All" contains a sample from "Rock Box" performed by Run-DMC.
- "Shazam!":
  - contains elements from "Open Sesame"; written by Robert Bell, Ronald Bell, George Brown, Claydes Smith, and Dennis Thomas; performed by Kool & the Gang.
  - contains a sample from the sound recording "Do What You Wanna Do", performed by Frank Howard & the Continentals.
- "An Open Letter to NYC":
  - contains elements from "Sonic Reducer"; written by Stiv Bators, Johnny Blitz, Cheetah Chrome, Jeff Magnum, David Thomas, and Jimmy Zero; performed by the Dead Boys.
  - contains samples of the voices of 50 Cent, RZA and Nas.
- The skit at the end of "We Got The" embodies a portion of "They Punctured My Yolk"; written by Wayne Coyne, Steven Drozd, Michael Ivins, and Ron Jones; performed by The Flaming Lips.
- The skit appearing between tracks 1 and 2 is a sample from the album Cool in the Furnace, performed by Buryl Red and Grace Hawthorne.
- Skits appearing prior to track 1, between tracks 5 and 6, and between tracks 13 and 14 are samples from "The O.J. Chronicles", an episode of The Joe Frank Show, performed by Joe Frank and David Cross.
- The skit appearing between tracks 10 and 11 is a sample from "Sounds", written by Gary Friedman and Will Holt, performed by the original cast of The Me Nobody Knows.

== Personnel ==
Personnel taken from To the 5 Boroughs liner notes.

- Beastie Boys – producers, engineers
- Supa Engineer DURO – mixing
- Jon Weiner – engineer
- Mix Master Mike – turntables
- Chris Athens – mastering at Sterling Sounds
- Matteo Pericoli – album cover

== Charts ==
=== Weekly charts ===
Weekly sales chart performance for To the 5 Boroughs
Chart (2004)	Peak position
Australian Albums (ARIA)	2
Australian Urban Albums (ARIA)	1
Austrian Albums (Ö3 Austria)	14
Belgian Albums (Ultratop Flanders)	9
Belgian Albums (Ultratop Wallonia)	21
Canadian Albums (Billboard)	1
Canadian R&B Albums (Nielsen SoundScan)	4
Danish Albums (Hitlisten)	8
Dutch Albums (Album Top 100)	14
Finnish Albums (Suomen virallinen lista)	4
French Albums (SNEP)	15
German Albums (Offizielle Top 100)	3
Irish Albums (IRMA)	8
Italian Albums (FIMI)	22
New Zealand Albums (RMNZ)	4
Norwegian Albums (VG-lista)	18
Scottish Albums (Official Charts)	4
Swedish Albums (Sverigetopplistan)	20
Swiss Albums (Schweizer Hitparade)	5
UK Albums (Official Charts)	2
UK R&B Albums (Official Charts)	1
US Billboard 200	1
US Top R&B/Hip-Hop Albums (Billboard)	1

=== Year-end charts ===
Annual sales chart performance for To the 5 Boroughs
Chart (2004)	Position
Swiss Albums (Schweizer Hitparade)	90
UK Albums (OCC)	143
US Billboard 200	62
US Top R&B/Hip-Hop Albums (Billboard)	77

== Certifications ==
Region	Certification	Certified units/sales
Australia (ARIA)	Gold	35,000^{^}
Canada (Music Canada)	Platinum	100,000^{^}
Japan (RIAJ)	Gold	100,000^{^}
United Kingdom (BPI)	Gold	100,000^{^}
United States (RIAA)	Platinum	1,000,000^{^}
^{^} Shipments figures based on certification alone.
