= So What'cha Want =

Single by Beastie Boys

from the album Check Your Head
- B-side: "The Skills to Pay the Bills"; "Groove Holmes"
- Released: June 2, 1992
- Studio: G-Son Studios, Atwater Village, CA
- Genre: Rap rock; alternative rap; rapcore; hip-hop
- Length: 3:36
- Label: Capitol
- Songwriters: Michael Diamond; Adam Horovitz; Adam Yauch
- Producers: Beastie Boys; Mario Caldato

Beastie Boys singles chronology
"Pass the Mic" (1992)	"So What'cha Want" (1992)	"Jimmy James" (1992)

Music video
- "So What'cha Want" on YouTube

"So What'cha Want" is a song by American hip-hop and rap rock group the Beastie Boys. It was released on June 2, 1992, as the second single from their third studio album, Check Your Head. The song appears in the video game Rock Band 2.

== Music video ==
The music video, directed by band member Adam "MCA" Yauch under his alias of "Nathaniel Hörnblowér", simply has the Beastie Boys recite the song in a woodland, addressing the viewer by looking down at the camera which is at ground level, with clips of DJ Hurricane and Money Mark interspersed throughout along with mild psychedelic distortions of colors in the video. It was one of the first music videos to feature slow motion action while the artists' lips remained in sync with the sound track, an effect that would later become a mainstay of music videos. The sky has a photo negative effect which was created by visualist Ash Beck, a direct allusion to the werewolf point-of-view in 1981 horror film Wolfen. Similarly, the infrared style incorporated during the band cutaways is an homage to the hunter vision in the film Predator (1987).

The video was featured in the 1993 "No Laughing" episode of Beavis and Butt-Head.

== Track listing ==
No.	Title	Length
1.	"So What'cha Want" (Single version)	3:37
2.	"The Skills to Pay the Bills" (Original version)	3:14
3.	"So What'cha Want" (Soul Assassins Remix version) (featuring Cypress Hill)	4:06
4.	"Groove Holmes" (LP version)	2:34
5.	"So What'cha Want" (Butt Naked version)	3:25
6.	"Groove Holmes" (Live vs. the Biz)	6:10
7.	"So What'cha Want" (All the Way Live Freestyle version)	3:37

== Charts ==
Chart (1992/1993)	Peak position
Australia (ARIA)	64
U.S. Billboard Hot 100	93
U.S. Billboard Bubbling Under R&B/Hip-Hop Songs	21
U.S. Billboard Hot Dance Music/Maxi-Singles Sales	26
U.S. Billboard Hot Rap Tracks	18
U.S. Billboard Modern Rock Tracks	22
US Cashbox Top 100	87
