= An Open Letter to NYC =

Single by Beastie Boys

from the album To the 5 Boroughs
- B-side: Instrumental / A cappella (12")
- Released: November 2004
- Recorded: 2004
- Studio: Oscilloscope Laboratories (Tribeca, New York)
- Genre: East Coast hip-hop; rap rock; alternative hip-hop; political hip-hop; alternative rock
- Length: 4:18
- Label: Capitol
- Songwriters: Michael Diamond; Adam Horovitz; Adam Yauch; Eugene O'Connor; David Lynn Thomas
- Producer: Beastie Boys

Beastie Boys singles chronology
"Now Get Busy" (2004)	"An Open Letter to NYC" (2004)	"The Electric Worm" (2007)

Music video
- "An Open Letter to NYC" on YouTube

"An Open Letter to NYC" is a song by American hip-hop group Beastie Boys. It was released in November 2004 by Capitol Records as the fourth and final single from their sixth studio album, To the 5 Boroughs (2004). The single entered and peaked at number 38 on the UK Singles Chart. The song was used during the opening credits of an episode of HBO's Taxicab Confessions, and is also included in the video game NBA Street V3. The group performed the song live during the 2004 MTV Europe Music Awards, on November 18, 2004 at the Tor di Valle Hippodrome, in Rome.

== Composition ==
The song's lyrics talk about the group's affection for their hometown, New York City. It alludes to the 9/11 terrorist attacks but also implies there are deeper flaws in the system people need to acknowledge and come together as a community, or suffer as a whole.

== Track listing ==
=== 12" vinyl ===
- Capitol — 7243 8 16523 1 2

Side A
No.	Title	Length
1.	"An Open Letter to NYC"	4:18
2.	"MTL Reppin' for the 514"	3:01

Side B
No.	Title	Length
1.	"An Open Letter to NYC" (Instrumental)	4:13
2.	"An Open Letter to NYC" (A cappella)	3:19

=== CD ===
- Capitol — 6189572, EMI/Parlophone — 70876 19857 2 8

No.	Title	Length
1.	"An Open Letter to NYC" (Andy Wallace Mix)	4:02
2.	"An Open Letter to NYC"	4:22
3.	"An Open Letter to NYC" (A cappella)	3:19
4.	"An Open Letter to NYC" (Instrumental)	4:13

== Charts ==
Chart (2004)	Peak position
Dutch Singles Chart	17
UK Singles Chart	38

== In popular culture ==
In the pilot of Succession one of the main characters, Kendall Roy, is introduced singing along to the song on headphones.
