= Check Your Head =

Studio album by Beastie Boys
- Released: April 21, 1992
- Recorded: 1991–1992
- Studios: G-Son, Atwater Village, California
- Genres: Alternative rock; hip-hop; rap rock; punk-rap; progressive rap
- Length: 53:29
- Labels: Grand Royal; Capitol
- Producer: Mario Caldato Jr.

Beastie Boys chronology
An Exciting Evening at Home with Shadrach, Meshach and Abednego (1989)	Check Your Head (1992)	Some Old Bullshit (1994)

Singles from Check Your Head
- 1. "Pass the Mic" Released: April 7, 1992; 2. "So What'cha Want" Released: June 2, 1992; 3. "Jimmy James" Released: August 28, 1992; 4. "Gratitude" Released: October 1992; 5. "Professor Booty" Released: December 15, 1992

Check Your Head is the third studio album by the American hip-hop group Beastie Boys, released on April 21, 1992, by Grand Royal and Capitol Records. It was their first album in three years, following Paul's Boutique (1989), and was recorded at the G-Son Studios in Atwater Village in 1991 under the guidance of producer Mario Caldato Jr., the group's third producer in as many albums. Less sample-heavy than their previous records, the album features instrumental contributions from all three members: Adam Horovitz on guitar, Adam Yauch on bass guitar, and Mike Diamond on drums.

The album was re-released in a number of formats in 2009, with 16 B-sides and rarities, as well as a commentary track, included as bonus material. It is one of the albums profiled in the 2007 book Check the Technique, which includes a track-by-track breakdown by Diamond, Yauch, Horovitz, Caldato, and frequent Beasties collaborator Money Mark.

== Background ==
Check Your Head was the first Beastie Boys album to be fully co-produced by Mario Caldato Jr., who had been an engineer on Paul's Boutique and was credited as producer on that album's track "Ask for Janice". It also marked the first appearance on one of their albums of keyboardist Money Mark, who became a regular collaborator of the band.

The album was somewhat of a return by the Beastie Boys to their punk roots. It featured the trio playing their own instruments on the majority of the album, for the first time on record since their early EPs, due to the commercial failure of the sample-dominated Paul's Boutique. Additionally, the band was influenced to play instruments on this album by Dutch group Urban Dance Squad; with Mike D on drums, Yauch on bass, Horovitz on guitar and Money Mark on keyboards. Mario Caldato, Jr., who had helped in the production of Paul's Boutique, engineered the record and became a longtime collaborator with the band, producing their albums throughout the 90s.

This shift inspired photographer Glen E. Friedman to shoot photos of the Beasties with their instrument cases, one of which was used as the cover of the album. Supposedly, a trading card for Norman Schwarzkopf Jr. from a set of Desert Storm trading cards was the inspiration for the album's title.

== Music ==
After the sampledelia-inspired direction of their previous album, the band looked back to their punk roots while still keeping with the experimental direction of Paul's Boutique. The album includes funk and jazz inspired songs such as "Lighten Up" and "Something's Got to Give". The band returned to their hardcore punk roots for the song "Time for Livin'", a cover of a 1974 Sly and the Family Stone song. The addition of instruments and the harder rock sound of the album could be considered a precursor to the nu metal genre of music to come out in the later half of the 1990s.

== Release ==
The album released on April 21, 1992, and represented a comeback for the group, peaking at No. 10 on the Billboard 200 and eventually being certified 2x platinum. The album was also supported by five singles: "Pass the Mic", "So What'cha Want", "Jimmy James", "Gratitude, and "Professor Booty".

The Beastie Boys toured with the Rollins Band and Cypress Hill in early 1992 to support Check Your Head.

== Critical reception ==
Retrospective professional ratings
Review scores
Source	Rating
AllMusic	5/5 stars
The A.V. Club	A−
Entertainment Weekly	A
Mojo	4/5 stars
Pitchfork	6.7/10
PopMatters	9/10
Q	5/5 stars
Record Collector	5/5 stars
Rolling Stone	4/5 stars
Spin Alternative Record Guide	8/10

In The New York Times, James Bernard wrote that the "frenzied hybrid" of musical styles on Check Your Head "is tough to follow but well worth the effort", concluding that the album "demonstrates that the Beastie Boys will risk commercial failure to do what they please." Adam Higginbotham gave it a four-out-of-five rating in Select and called it an "excellent" record that he nonetheless felt would sell poorly due to its "hopelessly eccentric" nature. Chicago Tribune critic Greg Kot awarded it three out of four stars and credited the Beastie Boys for "showing surprising resiliency and versatility", while Steven Blush of Spin praised the album's "thick, deep, textured, and varied" songs and emphasis on groove. Writing for Rolling Stone, Kevin Powell deemed it the group's "most unconventional outing to date" and found its eclecticism "confusing at times" but distinctive, giving the album three-and-a-half stars out of five. At the end of 1992, Check Your Head was named the year's fourth-best album by Spin, and it placed fifth in The Village Voice's Pazz & Jop critics' poll.

Stephen Dalton was less impressed in NME, rating Check Your Head six out of ten and finding that the Beastie Boys had regressed as lyricists, "mimicking the music's laid back laziness and trading much of their trademark humour for seemingly improvised shouting matches." In Entertainment Weekly, David Browne gave it a "D" grade and panned it as "sophomoric" and sounding "as if it were recorded underwater." Robert Christgau deemed the album a "great concept" executed only "halfway there at best" in a year-end essay for The Village Voice, later assigning it a "neither" rating.

=== Legacy ===
In a retrospective review, AllMusic editor Stephen Thomas Erlewine said that on Check Your Head, the Beastie Boys "repositioned themselves as a lo-fi, alt-rock groove band" who "had not abandoned rap, but it was no longer the foundation of their music, it was simply the most prominent in a thick pop-culture gumbo". He cited the album's "earth-bound D.I.Y." approach as "a big reason why it turned out to be an alt-rock touchstone of the '90s, something that both set trends and predicted them." The A.V. Club's Nathan Rabin called it "a dorm-room staple and cultural touchstone" that "was just as radical a reinvention" as Paul's Boutique and marked the group's "strangely organic evolution into adventurous sonic astronauts".

In 1995, Alternative Press placed Check Your Head at number 23 on its list of the top 99 albums released from 1985 to 1995. Four years later, Spin listed Check Your Head as the twelfth-best album of the 1990s. In 2022, Pitchfork ranked it as the 67th-best album of the 1990s, praising the album's funk-inspired instrumentals. It was ranked at number 261 in the 2020 edition of Rolling Stone's "500 Greatest Albums of All Time" list.

== Track listing ==
All tracks written by Beastie Boys (Adam Yauch, Michael Diamond, Adam Horovitz) and "Money" Mark Nishita, except where noted.

No.	Title	Writer(s)	Length
1.	"Jimmy James"	Beastie Boys; Mario Caldato, Jr.	3:14
2.	"Funky Boss"		1:35
3.	"Pass the Mic"	Beastie Boys; Caldato	4:17
4.	"Gratitude"	Beastie Boys; Tom Cushman	2:45
5.	"Lighten Up"		2:41
6.	"Finger Lickin' Good"	Beastie Boys; Caldato; DJ Hurricane; Tadone "Kool Tee" Hill	3:39
7.	"So What'cha Want"	Beastie Boys	3:37
8.	"The Biz vs. The Nuge"	Biz Markie; Ted Nugent	0:33
9.	"Time for Livin'"	Sylvester Stewart; Frontline	1:48
10.	"Something's Got to Give"	Beastie Boys; Nishita; Caldato	3:28
11.	"The Blue Nun"	Beastie Boys	0:32
12.	"Stand Together"	Beastie Boys; Caldato	2:47
13.	"Pow"		2:13
14.	"The Maestro"	Beastie Boys	2:52
15.	"Groove Holmes"		2:33
16.	"Live at P.J.'s"		3:18
17.	"Mark on the Bus"	Nishita	1:05
18.	"Professor Booty"	Beastie Boys; Caldato	4:13
19.	"In 3's"		2:23
20.	"Namasté"		4:01
Total length:			53:29

Japanese bonus tracks
No.	Title	Length
21.	"Dub the Mic" (Instrumental)
22.	"Drunken Praying Mantis Style"
23.	"Pass the Mic (Pt. 2, Skills to Pay the Bills)"
24.	"Netty's Girl"

2009 Remastered Edition Bonus Disc
No.	Title	Length
1.	"Dub the Mic" (Instrumental)	4:30
2.	"Pass the Mic (Pt. 2, Skills to Pay the Bills)"	4:25
3.	"Drunken Praying Mantis Style"	2:40
4.	"Netty's Girl"	3:24
5.	"The Skills to Pay the Bills" (Original Version)	3:16
6.	"So What'cha Want" (Soul Assassins Remix Version) (featuring Cypress Hill)	4:08
7.	"So What'cha Want" (Butt Naked Version)	3:29
8.	"Groove Holmes" (Live vs The Biz)	6:13
9.	"So What'cha Want" (All The Way Live Freestyle Version)	3:39
10.	"Stand Together" (Live at French's Tavern, Sydney, Australia)	2:32
11.	"Finger Lickin' Good" (Government Cheese Remix)	4:15
12.	"Gratitude" (Live at Budokan 9-16-92)	4:28
13.	"Honky Rink"	2:13
14.	"Jimmy James" (Original Version)	3:44
15.	"Boomin' Granny"	2:18
16.	"Drinkin' Wine"	4:42

=== Samples ===
- "Jimmy James" contains samples of "Foxy Lady", "Still Raining, Still Dreaming", and "EXP" by Jimi Hendrix.
- "Pass the Mic" contains a sample of "Choir" by James Newton.
- ”Finger Lickin’ Good” contains a sample of “Just Like Tom Thumbs Blues” by Bob Dylan.

== Personnel ==
Beastie Boys

- Ad-Rock – vocals, guitar
- MCA – vocals, bass
- Mike D – vocals, drums

Additional personnel

- Money Mark – synthesizer, clavinet, organ, Wurlitzer
- James Bradley, Jr. (Tracks 2, 4, 10, 13, 16, 20) – percussion
- Juanito Vazquez (Tracks 5, 15) – percussion (cuica, conga)
- Art Oliva (Tracks 5, 19) – percussion (batá, shakeree)
- Drew Lawrence (Track 6) – percussion (tambora, mridangam)
- Biz Markie – vocals on "The Biz Vs. The Nuge"
- Alexandra "Xan" Cassavetes (credited as "Nax Setevassac") – background vocals on "The Maestro"

Technical personnel

- Beastie Boys – producer
- Mario Caldato, Jr. – producer, engineer
- Tom Baker – mastering
- Glen E. Friedman – photography

== Charts ==
Weekly chart performance for Check Your Head
Chart (1992)	Peak position
Australian Albums (ARIA)	74
Canada Top Albums/CDs (RPM)	32
US Billboard 200	10
US Top R&B/Hip-Hop Albums (Billboard)	37

== Certifications ==
Certifications and sales for Check Your Head
Region	Certification	Certified units/sales
Canada (Music Canada)	2× Platinum	200,000^{^}
United Kingdom (BPI)	Silver	60,000^{*}
United States (RIAA)	2× Platinum	2,000,000^{^}
^{*} Sales figures based on certification alone.^{^} Shipments figures based on certification alone.
