= Pass the Mic =

Single by Beastie Boys

from the album Check Your Head
- B-side: "Time for Livin'", "Drunken Praying Mantis Style", "Netty's Girl"
- Released: April 7, 1992
- Genre: Hip-hop; rap rock
- Length: 4:16
- Label: Capitol
- Songwriters: Michael Diamond; Adam Horovitz; Adam Yauch; Mario Caldato Jr.
- Producers: Beastie Boys; Mario Caldato

Beastie Boys singles chronology
"Shadrach" (1989)	"Pass the Mic" (1992)	"So What'cha Want" (1992)

Music video
- "Pass the Mic" on YouTube

"Pass the Mic" is a song by American rap group the Beastie Boys, released in April 1992 by Capitol Records as the first single from their third studio album, Check Your Head (1992). It became a top-50 hit on the UK Singles Chart, peaking at number 47.

== Sampling lawsuit ==
In 2003, Beastie Boys were involved in the landmark sampling decision, Newton v. Diamond. In that case, a federal judge ruled that the band was not liable for sampling James Newton's "Choir" in their track, "Pass the Mic". The sample used is the six-second flute stab. In short, Beastie Boys cleared the sample but obtained only the rights to use the sound recording and not the composition rights to the song "Choir". In the decision, the United States Court of Appeals for the Ninth Circuit found that:

when viewed in relation to Newton's composition as a whole, the portion is neither quantitatively nor qualitatively significant... Because Beastie Boys' use of the sound recording was authorized, the sole basis of Newton's infringement action is his remaining copyright interest in the 'Choir' composition. We hold today that Beastie Boys' use of a brief segment of that composition, consisting of three notes separated by a half-step over a background C note, is not sufficient to sustain a claim for copyright infringement.

== Track listing ==
1. "Pass the Mic" (LP version) – 4:30
2. "Dub the Mic" (Instrumental) – 4:26
3. "Drunken Praying Mantis Style" – 2:37
4. "Pass the Mic (Pt. 2, Skills to Pay the Bills)" – 4:24
5. "Netty's Girl" – 5:39

== Charts ==
Chart (1992)	Peak position
Australia (ARIA)	199
UK Singles (OCC)	47
UK Dance (Music Week)	32
US Hot Dance Music/Maxi-Singles Sales (Billboard)	38
