= Adam Yauch =

American musician (1964–2012)

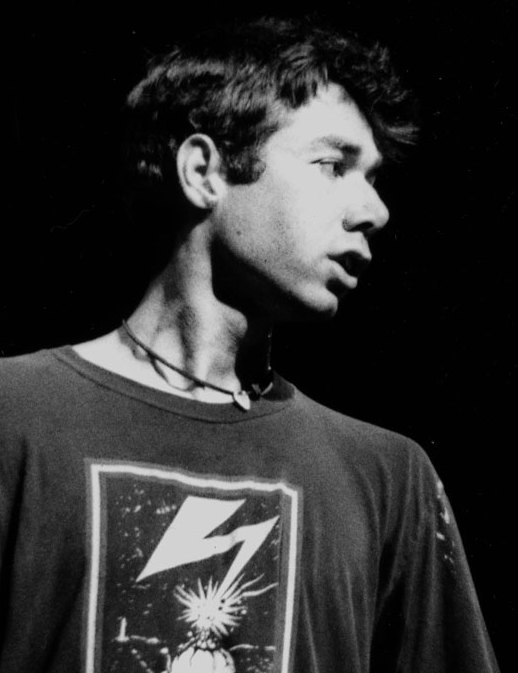
- Yauch in 1992

Background information
- Also known as: MC Adam; MCA; Nathanial Hörnblowér; Bloach; Abednego
- Born: Adam Nathaniel Yauch; August 5, 1964; New York City, U.S.
- Died: May 4, 2012 (aged 47) New York City, U.S.
- Genres: Hip hop; rap rock; alternative hip-hop
- Occupations: Musician; rapper; songwriter; filmmaker
- Instruments: Vocals; bass
- Years active: 1979–2012
- Formerly of: Beastie Boys
- Spouse: Dechen Wangdu (m. 1998)
- Partner: Lisa Ann Cabasa

Adam Nathaniel Yauch (/jaʊk/ YOWK; August 5, 1964 – May 4, 2012), known professionally as MCA, was an American rapper, musician, filmmaker, and activist who was a founding member of the hip hop group Beastie Boys. He directed many of the band's music videos and did much of their promotional photography, often using the pseudonym Nathanial Hörnblowér.

Yauch founded Oscilloscope Laboratories, an independent film production and distribution company based in New York City. As a Buddhist, he was involved in the Tibetan independence movement, started the Milarepa Fund, and organized the Tibetan Freedom Concert. He died in 2012 from parotid cancer, after which the Beastie Boys disbanded.

== Early life, family, and education ==
Born in Brooklyn, New York City, Yauch was an only child. His father Noel was an architect, and his mother, Frances, a social worker. She was Jewish and his father Catholic, but he had a non-religious upbringing in Brooklyn Heights.

Yauch attended Edward R. Murrow High School in Midwood, Brooklyn. In high school, he taught himself to play the bass guitar and formed the Beastie Boys from hardcore punk band Young Aborigines, with John Berry, Kate Schellenbach, and Michael Diamond. They played their first show on his 17th birthday. Yauch attended Bard College, studying electronic music for two years before dropping out.

== The Beastie Boys ==
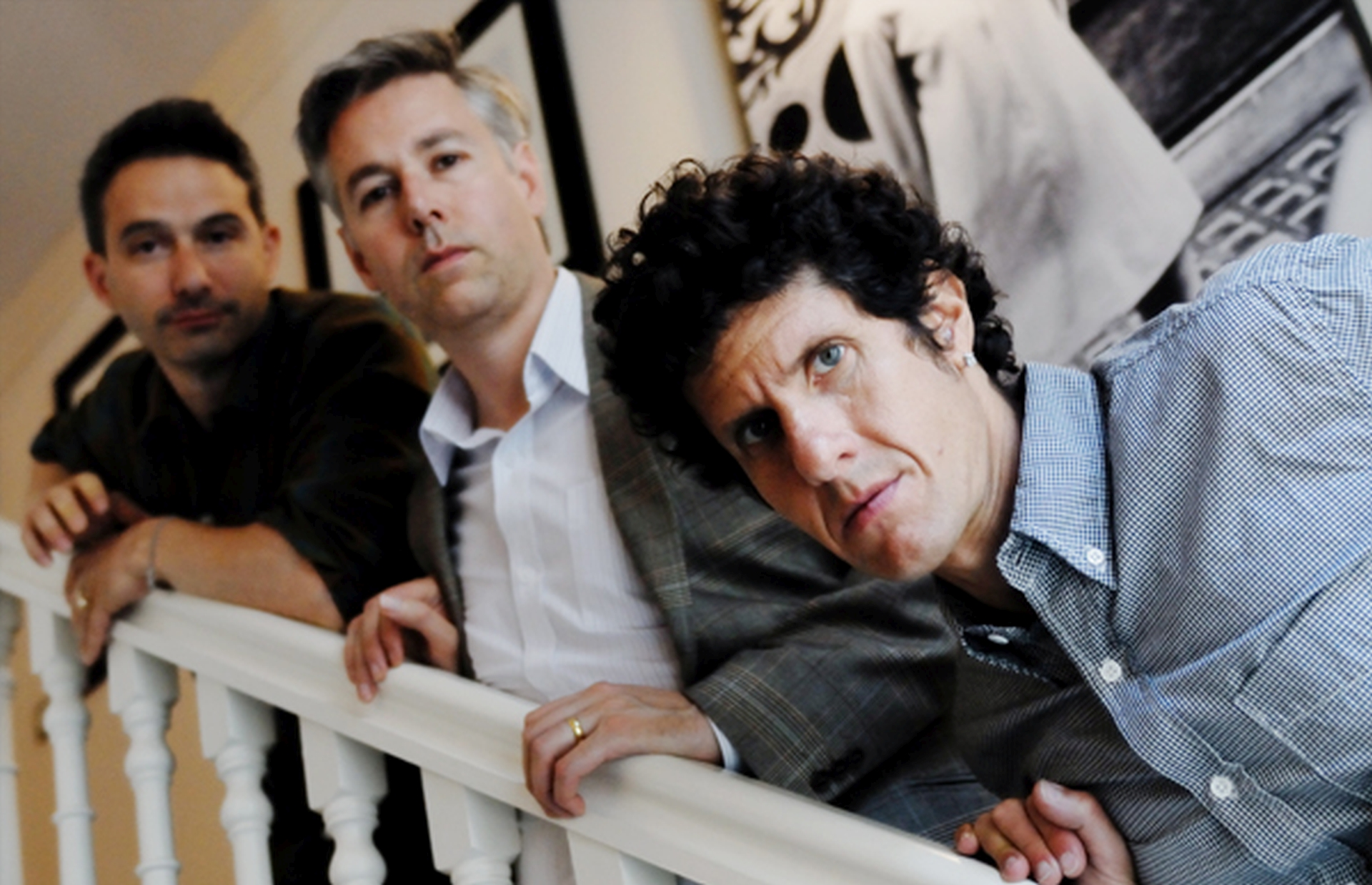
Yauch (center) with the Beastie Boys in 2009

The Beastie Boys, a hip-hop trio, released their first album Licensed to Ill on Def Jam Records when Yauch was 22. He directed many of the Beastie Boys' music videos, often under the pseudonym Nathanial Hörnblowér.

In 2002, Yauch constructed a recording studio in New York City called Oscilloscope Laboratories. He began an independent film distributing company called Oscilloscope Pictures. He directed the 2006 Beastie Boys concert film Awesome; I Fuckin' Shot That!

The Beastie Boys had sold 40 million records worldwide by 2010. In April 2012, the group was inducted into the Rock and Roll Hall of Fame. Yauch was inducted in absentia due to his illness. His bandmates paid tribute to him; a letter from Yauch was read to the audience.

In 2011, Yauch received the Charles Flint Kellogg Award in Arts and Letters from Bard College, the college he attended for two years. The award is "given in recognition of a significant contribution to the American artistic or literary heritage".

== Other independent work ==
He directed the 2008 film Gunnin' For That #1 Spot about eight high school basketball prospects at the Boost Mobile Elite 24 Hoops Classic at Rucker Park in Harlem, New York City.

Yauch produced Build a Nation (2007), the comeback album from hardcore/punk band Bad Brains. When Bad Brains released Into the Future (2012), the band dedicated the album to Yauch, their longtime friend and backer, who had died several months previously.

In addition, Oscilloscope Laboratories also distributed Kelly Reichardt's Wendy and Lucy (2008), Oren Moverman's The Messenger (2009), and Lynne Ramsay's We Need To Talk About Kevin (2011).

== Personal life and views ==
Yauch was a practicing Buddhist. He became an important voice in the Tibetan independence movement, creating the Milarepa Fund, a nonprofit organization devoted to Tibetan independence, and organized several benefit concerts to support the cause, including the Tibetan Freedom Concert.

Yauch dated actress Lisa Ann Cabasa in the late 1980s and early 1990s. He and Cabasa directed the video for the Beastie Boys song Jimmy James. In 1995, while attending a speech by the Dalai Lama at Harvard University, Yauch met Dechen Wangdu. They married in 1998 and had a daughter that year.

In 1998, during the MTV Video Music Awards, when receiving the Video Vanguard Award, Yauch condemned America's wars in Muslim countries and prejudice against Muslims and Arabs.

== Illness, death and legacy ==
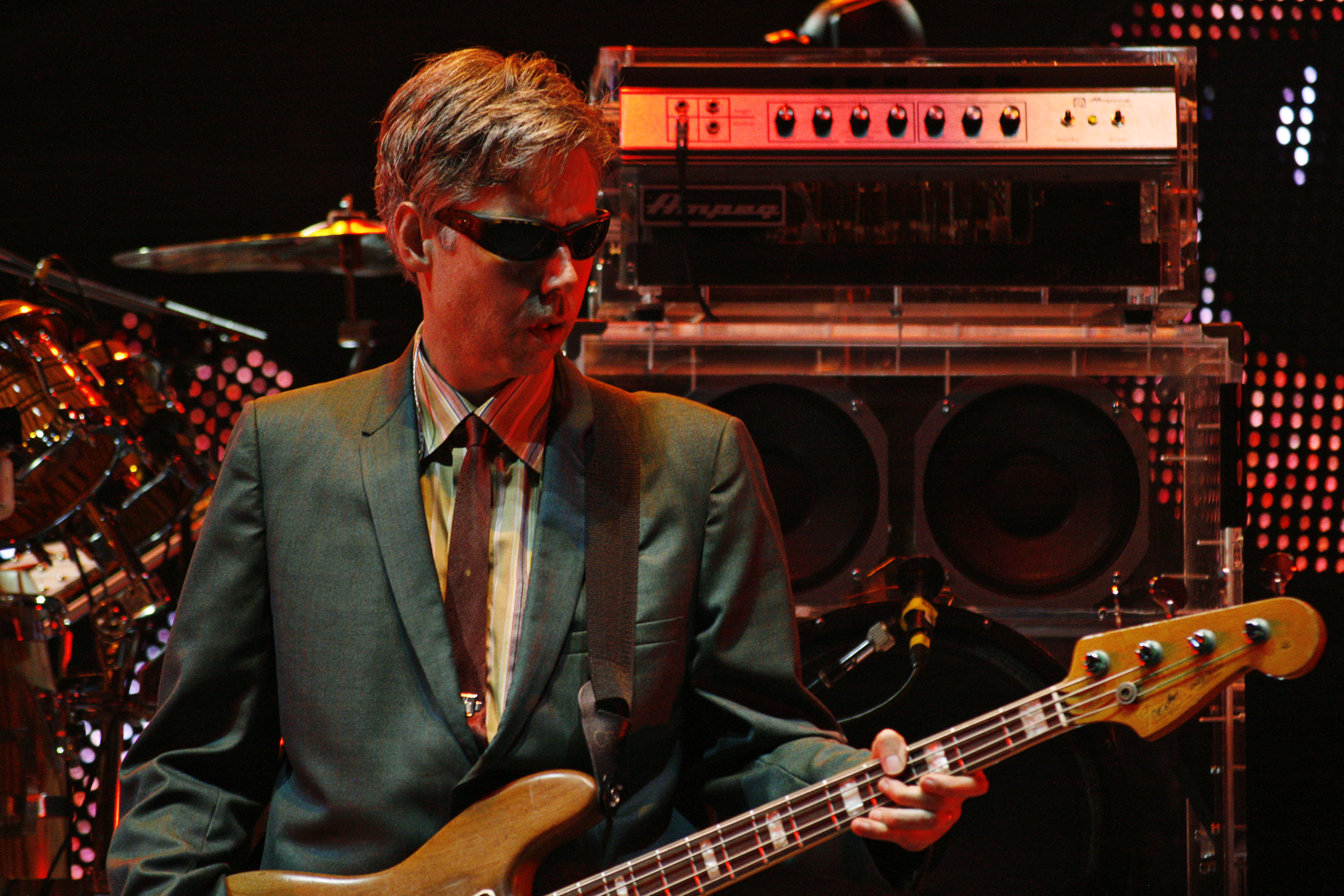
Yauch in 2007

In July 2009, Yauch was diagnosed with a cancerous parotid gland and lymph node. He underwent surgery and radiation therapy, delaying the release of Hot Sauce Committee Pt. 1 until 2011 (when it was renamed Hot Sauce Committee Part Two) and canceling the trio's planned tour. He was unable to appear in videos for the album. Announcing his diagnosis on the group's YouTube channel, Yauch called the cancer "very treatable" and said it wouldn't affect his vocal cords. He sought treatment from Tibetan doctors in Dharamshala, India.

On May 4, 2012, Yauch died in Manhattan, New York, at age 47. In his last will and testament, he left instructions that his music not be used in advertising.

On May 3, 2013, ceremonies were held to rename the Palmetto Playground in Brooklyn Heights Adam Yauch Park.

Yauch is also the subject of a mural dedicated to his memory at the Beastie Boys' former studios in Los Angeles.

== Discography ==
with the Beastie Boys

- Licensed to Ill (1986)
- Paul's Boutique (1989)
- Check Your Head (1992)
- Ill Communication (1994)
- Hello Nasty (1998)
- To the 5 Boroughs (2004)
- The Mix-Up (2007)
- Hot Sauce Committee Part Two (2011)
