= Jack Black filmography =

Jack Black's roles in films, TV series, and video games

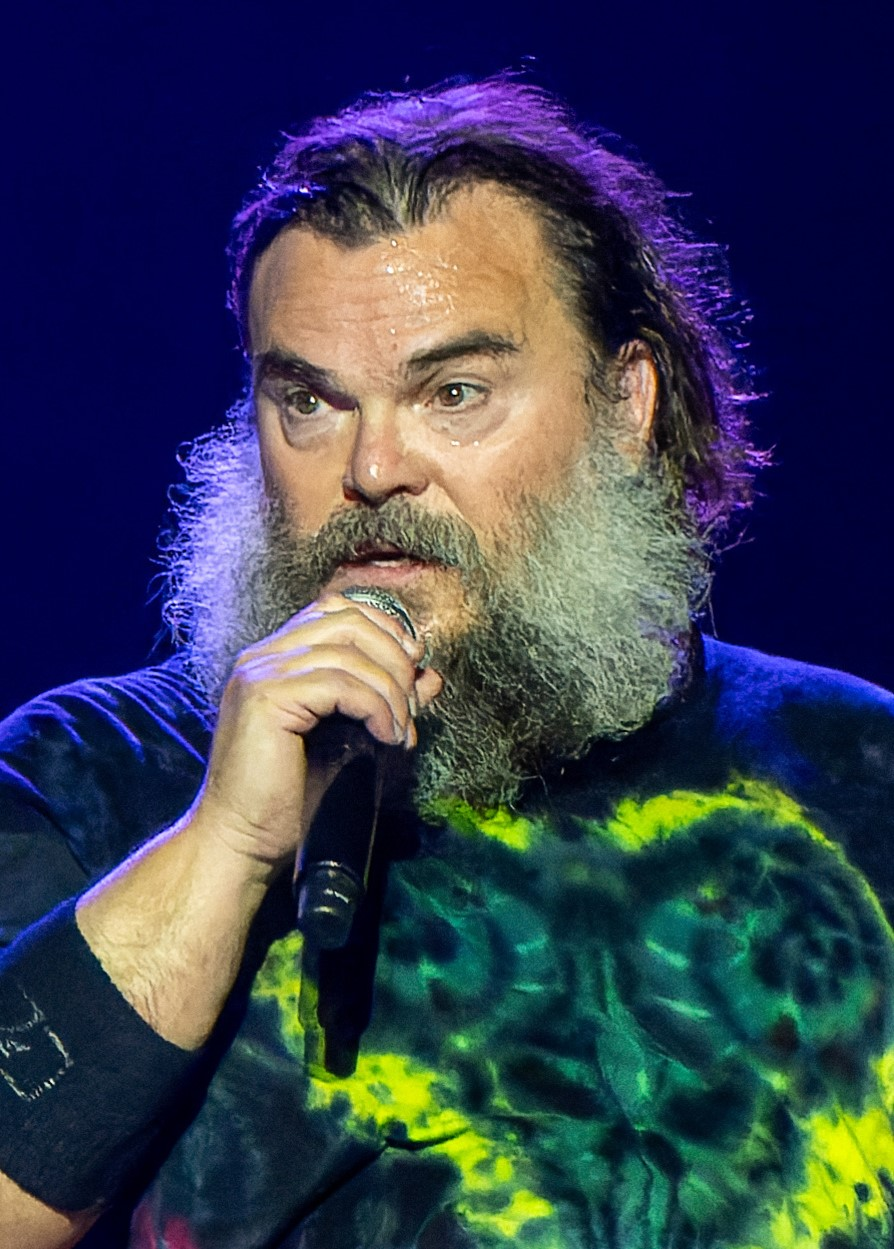
Black in 2023

Jack Black is an American actor. The following are his roles in film, television series, voice work and video games.

== Film ==
Key
†	Denotes films that have not yet been released

Year	Title	Role	Notes
1992	Bob Roberts	Roger Davis	
1993	Airborne	Augie	
1993	Demolition Man	Wasteland Scrap	
1994	The NeverEnding Story III	Slip	
1995	Bye Bye Love	DJ at party	
1995	Waterworld	Pilot	
1995	Dead Man Walking	Craig Poncelet	
1996	Bio-Dome	JB	
1996	The Cable Guy	Rick Legatos	
1996	The Fan	Broadcast technician	
1996	Mars Attacks!	Billy-Glenn Norris	
1996	Crossworlds	Steve	
1997	The Jackal	Ian Lamont	
1998	Johnny Skidmarks	Jerry	
1998	Bongwater	Devlin	
1998	Enemy of the State	Fiedler	
1998	I Still Know What You Did Last Summer	Titus Telesco	Uncredited
1999	The Love Letter	Fisherman	Uncredited
1999	Cradle Will Rock	Sid	
1999	Jesus' Son	Georgie	
2000	High Fidelity	Barry Judd	
2001	Frank's Book	Performance hipster	Short film
2001	Saving Silverman	JD McNugent	
2001	Shallow Hal	Harold "Hal" Larson	
2002	Orange County	Lance Brumder	
2002	Run Ronnie Run!	Lead chimney sweep	
2002	Ice Age	Zeke	Voice
2003	Melvin Goes to Dinner	Mental patient	
2003	School of Rock	Dewey Finn	
2004	Envy	Nick Vanderpark	
2004	Anchorman: The Legend of Ron Burgundy	Motorcyclist	Cameo
2004	Shark Tale	Lenny	Voice
2005	King Kong	Carl Denham	
2006	Nacho Libre	Ignacio / Nacho	Also producer
2006	Tenacious D in The Pick of Destiny	JB	Also producer and writer
2006	The Holiday	Miles	
2007	Margot at the Wedding	Malcolm	
2007	Walk Hard: The Dewey Cox Story	Paul McCartney	Uncredited cameo
2008	Be Kind Rewind	Jerry McLean	
2008	Kung Fu Panda	Po	Voice
2008	Secrets of the Furious Five	Po	Voice; Short film
2008	Prop 8: The Musical	Jesus Christ	Short film
2008	Tropic Thunder	Jeff "Fats" Portnoy	
2009	Year One	Zed	
2010	Kung Fu Panda Holiday	Po	Voice; Short film
2010	Gulliver's Travels	Lemuel Gulliver	Also executive producer
2011	Kung Fu Panda 2	Po	Voice
2011	Kung Fu Panda: Secrets of the Masters	Po	Voice; Short film
2011	Bernie	Bernie Tiede	
2011	The Big Year	Brad Harris	
2011	The Muppets	Himself	Uncredited
2014	Sex Tape	Lamont	Uncredited
2015	The D Train	Dan Landsman	Also producer
2015	Goosebumps	R. L. Stine / Slappy and the Invisible Boy (voices)	
2016	Kung Fu Panda 3	Po	Voice
2016	Kung Fu Panda: Secrets of the Scroll	Po	Voice; Short film
2017	The Polka King	Jan Lewan	Also producer
2017	Jumanji: Welcome to the Jungle	Professor Sheldon "Shelly" Oberon	
2018	Don't Worry, He Won't Get Far on Foot	Dexter	
2018	The Unexpected Race	Sheriff	
2018	The House with a Clock in Its Walls	Jonathan Barnavelt	
2018	Goosebumps 2: Haunted Halloween	R. L. Stine	Uncredited
2019	Jumanji: The Next Level	Professor Sheldon "Shelly" Oberon	
2022	Apollo 10½: A Space Age Childhood	Adult Stanley	Voice
2022	Weird: The Al Yankovic Story	Wolfman Jack	
2023	The Super Mario Bros. Movie	Bowser	Voice
2024	Kung Fu Panda 4	Po	Voice
2024	Dueling Dumplings	Po	Voice; Short film
2024	Borderlands	Claptrap	Voice
2024	Free LSD	The Crazed Scientist	
2024	Dear Santa	Asmodeus / "Satan" / "Santa Claus"	
2025	A Minecraft Movie	Steve	
2025	Anaconda	Doug McCallister	
2026	The Super Mario Galaxy Movie	Bowser / Dry Bowser	Voice
2026	Jumanji: Open World †	Professor Sheldon "Shelly" Oberon	Post-production
2027	A Minecraft Movie Squared †	Steve	Filming

== Television ==
Year	Title	Role	Notes
1984	The Fall Guy	Young Colt's Friend	Episode: "Old Heroes Never Die"
1985	The New Leave It to Beaver	Nick	Episode: "Movin' On"
1991	Our Shining Moment	Teenage boy	Pilot
1992	The Golden Palace	Taxi driver	Episode: "Seems Like Old Times: Part 2"
1992	Great Scott!	Ray	Episode: "Book Crook"
1993	Life Goes On	Skinhead	Episode: "Incident on Main"
1993	Northern Exposure	Kevin Wilkins	Episode 5-5: "A River Doesn't Run Through It"
1993	Marked for Murder	Car thief	Television film
1994	Blind Justice	Private	Television film
1994	The Innocent	Marty Prago	Television film
1995	All-American Girl	Tommy	Episode "A Night at the Oprah"
1995	Pride & Joy	Man	Episode: "Brenda's Secret"
1995	The Single Guy	Randy	Episode: "Sister"
1995	Touched by an Angel	Monte	Episode: "Angels on the Air"
1995	The X-Files	Bart "Zero" Liquori	Episode: "D.P.O."
1995–1996	Mr. Show with Bob and David	Various characters	4 episodes
1995–1996	Picket Fences	Curtis Williams	2 episodes
1997–2000	Tenacious D	JB	Main role; also co-creator, writer and producer
1998–2026	Saturday Night Live	Himself / various	5 episodes as host, 2 as musical guest (with Tenacious D)
1999	Heat Vision and Jack	Jack	Pilot
2002	2002 MTV Movie Awards	Himself (host)	Television special
2002	The Andy Dick Show	J.D.	Episode: "Flipped"
2002	Clone High	Pusher / Larry Hardcore (voices)	Episode: "Raisin the Stakes"
2002	Crank Yankers	Tenacious D	Episode: "#1.3"
2002	MADtv	Tenacious D	Episode: "#7.22"
2003	Player$	Tenacious D	Episode: "Tenacious D a la Mode"
2003	Will & Grace	Dr. Isaac Hershberg	Episode: "Nice in White Satin"
2003, 2004	Computerman	Computerman	6 episodes; Also executive producer
2003, 2004	Time Belt	Computerman	2 episodes
2004	Cracking Up	Bruce	Episode: "Scared Straight"
2004	Tom Goes to the Mayor	Trapper JB (voice)	Episode: "Bear Traps"
2006	Kids' Choice Awards	Himself (host)	Television special
2006	MTV Video Music Awards	Himself (host)	Television special
2007	Acceptable.TV	—N/a	Executive producer
2007	The Naked Trucker and T-Bones Show	Jables	Episode: "Break-Up"
2007	Kids' Choice Awards	Himself	Television special
2007	The Simpsons	Milo (voice)	Episode: "Husbands and Knives"
2008	Kids' Choice Awards	Himself (host)	Television special
2008	Sesame Street	Himself	2 episodes
2008	Spike Video Game Awards	Himself (host)	Television special
2009	The Office	Himself (as Sam)	Episode: "Stress Relief"
2009	Kids' Choice Awards	Himself	Television special
2009	Yo Gabba Gabba!	Himself	Episode: "New Friends"
2010	Community	Buddy Austin	Episode: "Investigative Journalism"
2010	iCarly	Aspartamay	Episode: "iStart a Fanwar"
2010	Take Two with Phineas and Ferb	Himself	Episode: Jack Black; short form series
2011	Kids' Choice Awards	Himself (host)	Television special
2012, 2015	Comedy Bang! Bang!	Himself	2 episodes
2013–2018	Drunk History	Various	5 episodes
2013	Metalocalypse: The Doomstar Requiem	Dethklok's original manager / Fat Blogger (voices)	Television special
2014	Meet Me at the Reck	Himself	YouTube series; Episode: "Cat in Black Ft. Stampylonghead & Jack Black"
2015	Workaholics	Pritchard DeMamp	Episode: "Gramps DeMamp is Dead"
2015	The Brink	Alex Talbot	10 episodes; also producer
2015	Documentary Now!	Jamison Friend	Episode: "Dronez: The Hunt for El Chingon"
2016	Panda Republic	Narrator (voice)	Documentary
2016	Australia's Got Talent	Guest Judge	Episode: "Grand Finale" (season 8)
2017	Great Minds with Dan Harmon	Ludwig van Beethoven	Episode: "Ludwig van Beethoven"
2017	The Last Man on Earth	Rear Admiral Roy Billups	Episode: "M.U.B.A.R."
2018	Tenacious D in Post-Apocalypto	JB (voice)	Main role; also co-creator, director, writer and producer
2020	Happy Happy Joy Joy: The Ren and Stimpy Story	Himself	Documentary
2020	Celebrity Escape Room	Himself (host)	Television special
2020	Home Movie: The Princess Bride	Dread Pirate Roberts	2 episodes
2021	Waffles + Mochi	Himself	Episode: "Water"
2022	Big Nate	Brad Gunter (voice)	Episode: "The Legend of the Gunting"
2022	Rick and Morty	Lithdor, the Viscount of Venus (voice)	Episode: "A Rick in King Mortur's Mort"
2022–2023	Kung Fu Panda: The Dragon Knight	Po (voice)	Main role; also executive producer
2023	History of the World, Part II	Joseph Stalin	2 episodes
2023	The Mandalorian	Captain Bombardier	Episode: "Chapter 22: Guns for Hire"
2025	Bob's Burgers	Himself (voice)	Episode: "Grand Pre-Pre-Pre-Opening"

== Video games ==
Year	Title	Role	Notes
2005	Peter Jackson's King Kong	Carl Denham	
2009	Brütal Legend	Eddie Riggs	
2014	Broken Age	Harm'ny Lightbeard	
2015	Goosebumps: Night of Scares	R. L. Stine and Slappy the Dummy	
2020	Goosebumps: Dead of Night	R. L. Stine and Slappy the Dummy	
2020	Tony Hawk's Pro Skater 1 + 2	Officer Dick	
2021	Psychonauts 2	The Mote of Light/Helmut Fullbear	
2022	High on Life	Himself	Cameo
2022	Pocket Mortys	Lithdor, the Viscount of Venus	
2023	Solarpunk Simulator	Captain Jack Black	Licensed game on Roblox
2025	Minecraft	Steve	A Minecraft Movie live event and downloadable content
2025	Tony Hawk's Pro Skater 3 + 4	Officer Dick/Constable Richard	

== Theatre ==
Year	Title	Role	Notes
2006	Jesus Christ Superstar	King Herod	Ricardo Montalban Theatre

== TV commercials ==
Year	Title	Role
1982	Pitfall! commercial	Himself

== Awards ==
Award	Year	Category	Work	Result
American Comedy Award	2001	Funniest Supporting Actor in a Motion Picture	High Fidelity	Nominated
Annie Awards	2023	Outstanding Achievement for Voice Acting in a Feature Production	The Super Mario Bros. Movie	Nominated
Astra Film Awards	2023	Best Voice-Over Performance	The Super Mario Bros. Movie	Nominated
Blockbuster Entertainment Award	2001	Favorite Supporting Actor – Comedy/Romance	High Fidelity	Won
Boston Society of Film Critics	2008	Best Cast	Tropic Thunder	Won
Chicago Film Critics Association	2000	Best Supporting Actor	High Fidelity	Nominated
Children's and Family Emmy Awards	2023	Outstanding Voice Performance in an Animated Program	Kung Fu Panda: The Dragon Knight	Won
Critics' Choice Movie Awards	2012	Best Actor in a Comedy	Bernie	Nominated
DVD Exclusive Award	2003	Best Original Song	Run Ronnie Run!	Won
DVD Exclusive Award	2004	Best Supporting Actor	Melvin Goes to Dinner	Nominated
Golden Globe Awards	2003	Best Actor – Motion Picture Musical or Comedy	School of Rock	Nominated
Golden Globe Awards	2012	Best Actor – Motion Picture Musical or Comedy	Bernie	Nominated
Golden Raspberry Awards	2010	Worst Actor	Gulliver's Travels	Nominated
Golden Raspberry Awards	2024	Worst Actor	Dear Santa	Nominated
Golden Raspberry Awards	2024	Worst Supporting Actor	Borderlands	Nominated
Gotham Independent Film Award	2007	Best Ensemble Cast	Margot at the Wedding	Nominated
Gotham Independent Film Award	2012	Best Ensemble Cast	Bernie	Nominated
Independent Spirit Awards	2012	Best Male Lead	Bernie	Nominated
MTV Movie Award	2001	Breakthrough Male Performance	High Fidelity	Nominated
MTV Movie Award	2001	Best Music Moment	High Fidelity	Nominated
MTV Movie Award	2004	Best Comedic Performance	School of Rock	Won
MTV Movie Award	2004	Best On-Screen Team (Note: Shard with cast)	School of Rock	Nominated
MTV Movie Award	2007	Best Fight	Nacho Libre	Nominated
MTV Movie Award	2018	Best Comedic Performance	Jumanji: Welcome to the Jungle	Nominated
MTV Movie Award	2018	Best On-Screen Team (Note: Shard with Dwayne Johnson, Kevin Hart, Karen Gillan and Nick Jonas)	Jumanji: Welcome to the Jungle	Nominated
New York Film Critics Circle	2003	Best Actor	School of Rock	3rd place
New York Film Critics Circle	2012	Best Actor	Bernie	Runner-up
Nickelodeon Kids' Choice Award	2007	Favorite Movie Actor	Nacho Libre	Nominated
Nickelodeon Kids' Choice Award	2009	Favorite Male Voice from an Animated Movie	Kung Fu Panda	Won
Nickelodeon Kids' Choice Award	2011	Favorite Movie Actor	Gulliver's Travels	Nominated
Nickelodeon Kids' Choice Award	2012	Favorite Male Voice from an Animated Movie	Kung Fu Panda 2	Nominated
Nickelodeon Kids' Choice Award	2017	Most Wanted Pet	Kung Fu Panda 3	Nominated
Nickelodeon Kids' Choice Award	2024	Favorite Male Voice from an Animated Movie	Kung Fu Panda 4	Nominated
Nickelodeon Kids' Choice Award	2024	Favorite Male Voice from an Animated Movie	The Super Mario Bros. Movie	Nominated
Nickelodeon Kids' Choice Award	2024	Favorite Villain	The Super Mario Bros. Movie	Won
Nickelodeon Kids' Choice Award	2025	Favorite Movie Actor	A Minecraft Movie	Won
Nickelodeon Kids' Choice Award	2025	Favorite Butt-Kicker	A Minecraft Movie	Nominated
Online Film Critics Society	2000	Best Supporting Actor	High Fidelity	Nominated
People's Choice Award	2012	Favorite Animation Movie Voice	Kung Fu Panda 2	Nominated
People's Choice Award	2016	Favorite Comedic Movie Actor	Goosebumps	Nominated
Phoenix Film Festival	2002	Best Ensemble Acting	Melvin Goes to Dinner	Won
Satellite Awards	2003	Best Actor – Motion Picture Musical or Comedy	School of Rock	Nominated
Spike Video Game Award	2005	Best Performance by a Male	Peter Jackson's King Kong	Won
Spike Video Game Award	2005	Best Cast	Peter Jackson's King Kong	Won
Spike Video Game Award	2009	Best Voice	Brütal Legend	Won
Teen Choice Awards	2002	Choice Movie: Comedy Actor	Shallow Hal	Nominated
Teen Choice Awards	2004	Choice Movie: Comedy Actor	School of Rock	Nominated
Teen Choice Awards	2004	Choice Movie Liar	School of Rock	Nominated
Teen Choice Awards	2006	Choice Movie: Comedy Actor	Nacho Libre	Nominated
Teen Choice Awards	2006	Choice Movie Chemistry	Nacho Libre	Nominated
Teen Choice Awards	2006	Choice Movie Rumble	Nacho Libre	Nominated
Teen Choice Awards	2006	Choice Movie Villain	King Kong	Nominated
Teen Choice Awards	2011	Choice Movie Voice	Kung Fu Panda 2	Nominated
