= Blue force tracking =

Battlefield awareness technology

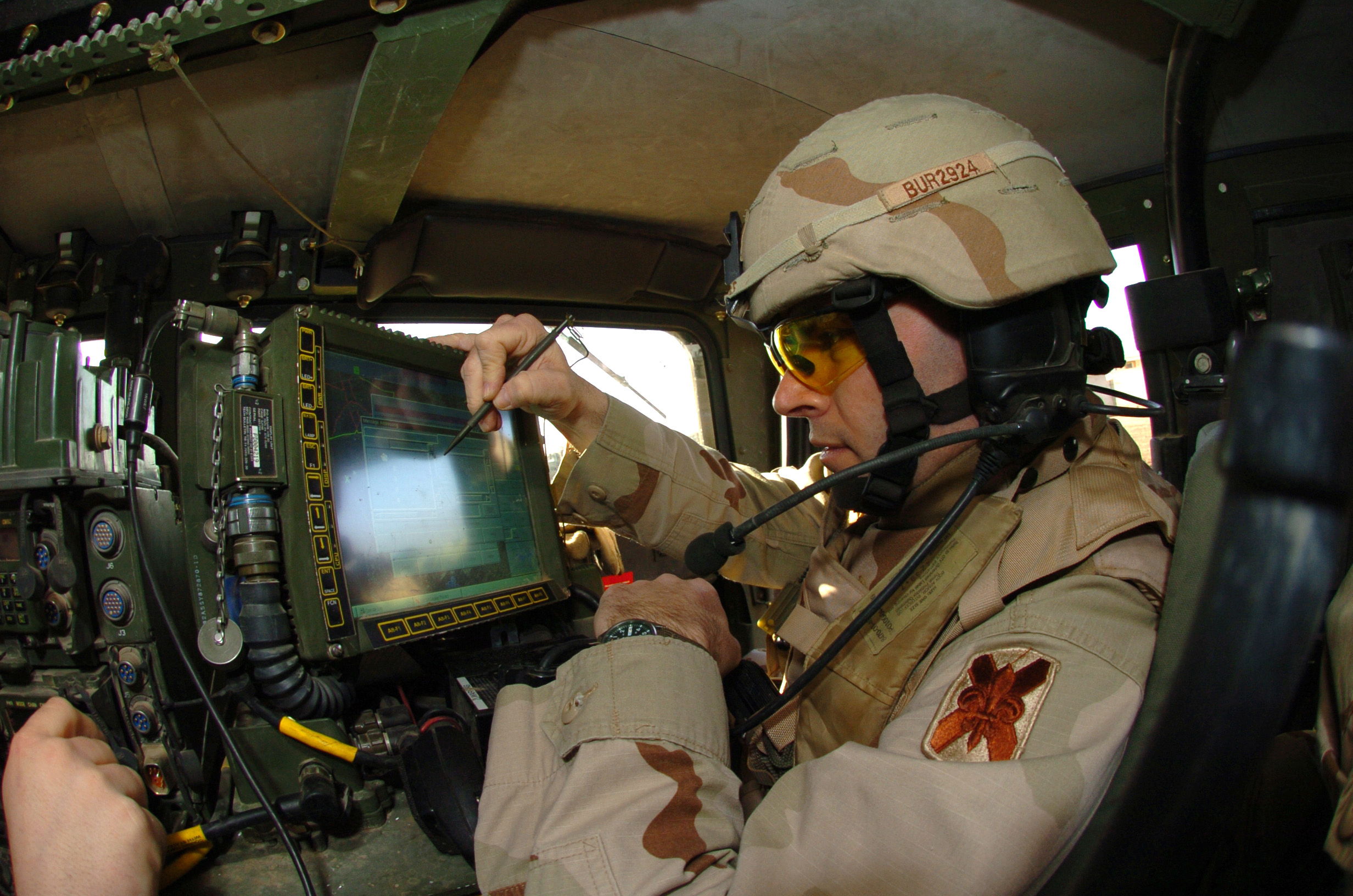
A U.S. soldier preparing his Blue Force Tracker before departing Camp Victory, Iraq in 2005

Blue force tracking is a United States military term for a GPS-enabled capability that provides military commanders and forces with location information about friendly (and despite its name, also hostile) military forces. In NATO military symbology, blue typically denotes friendly forces. The capability provides a common picture of the location of friendly forces and therefore is referred to as the blue force tracker. When all capitalized, the term refers to a specific defense contractors' system, but the capability is found in many military and civilian mobile apps.

== Systems ==
Blue force tracking (BFT) systems consist of a computer, used to display location information, a satellite terminal and satellite antenna, used to transmit location and other military data, a Global Positioning System receiver (to determine its own position), command-and-control software (to send and receive orders, and many other battlefield support functions), and mapping software, usually in the form of a geographic information system (GIS), that plots the BFT device on a map. The system displays the location of the host vehicle on the computer's terrain-map display, along with the locations of other platforms (friendly in blue, and enemy in red) in their respective locations. BFT can also be used to send and receive text and imagery messages, and has a mechanism for reporting the locations of enemy forces and other battlefield conditions (for example, the location of minefields, battlefield obstacles, bridges that are damaged, etc.).

Additional capability in some BFT devices is found in route planning tools. By inputting grid coordinates, the BFT becomes both the map and compass for mechanized units. With proximity warnings enabled, the vehicle crew is made aware as they approach critical or turn points.

Neil Siegel, then of TRW, is credited with leading the development of Force XXI Battle Command Brigade-and-Below (FBCB2), the first successful large-scale blue-force tracking system. This system was often called "the digital battlefield".

== Adoption ==
Users of BFT systems include the United States Army, the United States Marine Corps, the United States Air Force, the United States Navy ground-based expeditionary forces (e.g., United States Naval Special Warfare Command (NSWC) and Navy Expeditionary Combat Command (NECC) units), the United Kingdom, and German Soldier System IdZ-ES+.

In 2008, work began on plans to reach the level of nearly 160,000 tracking systems in the US Army within a few years; the system prime contractor is the Northrop Grumman corporation of Los Angeles, California.

In November 2010, the US Army and the US Marine Corps reached an agreement to standardize on a shared system, to be called "Joint Battle Command Platform", which will be derived from the Army's FBCB2 system that was used by the US Army, the US Marine Corps, and the British Army during heavy combat operations in the Iraq War in 2003.

An Army-specific Blue Force Tracking technology is Force XXI Battle Command Brigade and Below, or FBCB2. The system continually transmits locations over the FBCB2 network. It then monitors the location and progress of friendly (and enemy) forces, and sends those specific coordinates to a central location called the Army Tactical Operations Center. There the data are consolidated into a common operational picture, or COP, and sent to numerous destinations, such as the headquarters element, other in-theater forces, or back out to other military units for situational awareness. The system also allows users to input or update operational graphics (i.e. obstacles, engineer reconnaissance on the road, enemy forces). Once uploaded, it can either be sent to higher headquarters or "mailed" to other subscribers of that user's list, or other BFT users within the subscription system. The M1A1 Abrams's tank AIM refurbishment/upgrade program includes FBCB2 and Blue Force Tracking.

The BFT system, and the FBCB2 system of which it is a variant, have won numerous awards and accolades, including: recognition in 2001 as one of the five best-managed software programs in the entire US Government, the 2003 Institute for Defense and Government Advancement's award for most innovative US Government program, the 2003 Federal Computer Week Monticello Award (given in recognition of an information system that has a direct, meaningful impact on human lives), and the Battlespace Information 2005 "Best Program in Support of Coalition Operations".

== See also ==
- Force XXI Battle Command Brigade and Below
- Program Executive Office Command Control and Communications Tactical

=== Civilian/commercial equivalents ===
- Android Tactical Assault Kit
- Automatic Packet Reporting System
- Find My Friends
- Swarm (app)
- Meshtastic
