= Neil Siegel =

American computer scientist (born 1954)

- Born: Neil Gilbert Siegel; February 19, 1954 (age 72); Brooklyn, New York, U.S.
- Education: University of Southern California
- Known for: Blue-Force Tracking; FBCB2; Hunter UAV multicast communications protocols low-data-rate networking protocols Tactical Operations Centers; Command and Control Centers
- Spouse: Robyn Friend
- Mother: Judith Love Cohen
- Relatives: Jack Black (half-brother)
- Awards: US National Medal of Technology and Innovation (2023); US National Academy of Engineering (2005); IEEE Simon Ramo Medal (2011); IEEE Fellow (2011); US National Academy of Inventors (2019)
- Scientific career
- Fields: Engineering, systems engineering, computer science
- Workplaces: TRW; Northrop Grumman; University of Southern California
- Doctoral advisor: Barry Boehm
- Website: neilsiegel.usc.edu

Neil Gilbert Siegel (born February 19, 1954) is an American computer scientist and computer engineer, known for his development of many key systems for the United States military, including the Blue-Force Tracking system, the U.S. Army's first unmanned air vehicle system, and the US Army forward-area air defense system. Several of his inventions also found their way into consumer products, such as hand-held devices (e.g., mobile GPS devices, smartphones, etc.) whose map displays automatically orient themselves to align with the real-world's cardinal points. He also participated in the development of techniques that are now widely-used in healthcare.

== Early life and work ==
Siegel was born in Brooklyn, New York, to engineers Bernard Siegel and Judith Love Cohen, and has lived most of his life in the area southwest of Los Angeles. He has two full siblings, Howard and Rachel, and is an older half-brother of actor Jack Black. He attended the University of Southern California, earning degrees in mathematics. During and after this time, he worked as a professional musician, mostly performing on the flute, and also playing folk and art music from the Balkans and the Middle East. Later, he earned a Ph.D. in systems engineering (also from USC), where his Ph.D. advisor was noted computer scientist Barry Boehm.

In 1976, he began work at what was then TRW (acquired by Northrop Grumman in 2002).

== Career ==
Starting in 1993, he led an organization at TRW that developed one-of-a-kind automation systems for the US military and (to a lesser extent) commercial companies. This organization achieved significant business success, growing rapidly every year during his tenure as leader (which continued until 2001). They created many new products whose general theme was automation support to decision-makers who operate in complex and stressful environments. In addition to the US Army and the US Air Force, customers during this time included the US steel industry and the movie industry.

In 1993, his team fielded the US Army's first fully automated command-and-control system, the Forward-Area Air Defense C2 System. This system is still in use today.

In 1995, his team won the contract to develop the US Army's first "digital battlefield" system, called Force-XXI Battle Command Brigade and Below (generally known by the acronym FBCB2). This has resulted in a highly regarded capability for the US, now used by the Marine Corps, as well as the Army.

Also in 1995, his team delivered the US Army's first automated command post, which has been followed by a long series of related capabilities to the present time.

In 1997, he was given responsibility for "fixing" the Hunter UAV program, the US Army's first unmanned air vehicle. The program had suffered a series of crashes during testing, and was nominally "cancelled". During his tenure, the program became one of the US' most reliable unmanned air vehicles. The Hunter entered operational service in 1999 in the Balkans. Unmanned air vehicles were unreliable novelties in 1997, but by the time he retired in 2015, unmanned air vehicles were in widespread use in both military and civilian settings.

His personal science and engineering contributions included many of the most-important techniques for transitioning the internet from wired to wireless operation. These include techniques for adapting the internet to operate over the slower and less reliable communications links entailed in wireless operation, such as a patent for performing routing in a constantly-changing network (ultra-low bandwidth intra-network routing) and achieving acceptable dynamics through what he calls "force-structure-aware" networks. He and his team also hold the first patent for having the display screen on a mobile device turn as the device is rotated, and they also hold the first patent for remote security administration of mobile devices that have been lost or stolen.

He has been a pioneer in large-scale deployments of GPS-enabled applications (like the Blue-Force Tracking system). He has also been active in the field of structuring large-scale software developments so as to match the skill distribution encountered in real-world teams.

Since mid-2001, he has been the chief technology officer of TRW's Systems (now Northrop Grumman Mission Systems, and later, Northrop Grumman Information Systems). Prior to his tenure as VP / CTO, he served as VP / general manager of the Tactical Systems Division.

His work during this time has extended his earlier work in military networks, force-structure-aware networks, and large-scale system engineering methodologies. He retired at the end of 2015. He served as a VP and officer of the company for nearly 18 years.

As of 2016, Siegel became the IBM Professor of Engineering Management at USC. In 2021, he also became a Professor of Computer Science Practice; in 2024, he became a Professor of Industrial and Systems Engineering Practice with Distinction; and in 2025, he also became a Professor of Computer Science Practice with Distinction. He is also an adjunct professor of engineering at UCLA.

=== Awards and honors ===
Neil Siegel receiving awards

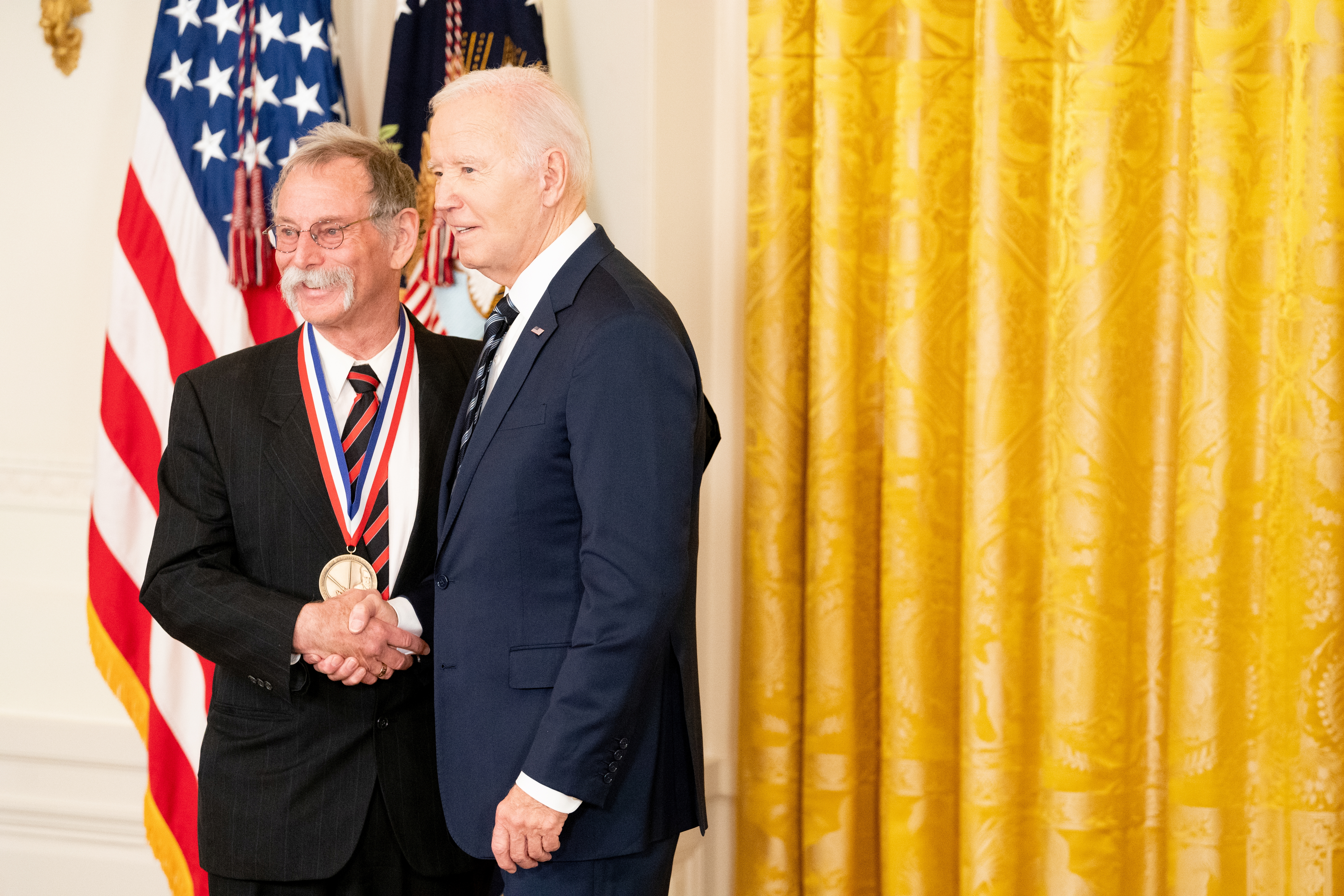
National Medal of Technology and Innovation, presented by the President of the United States

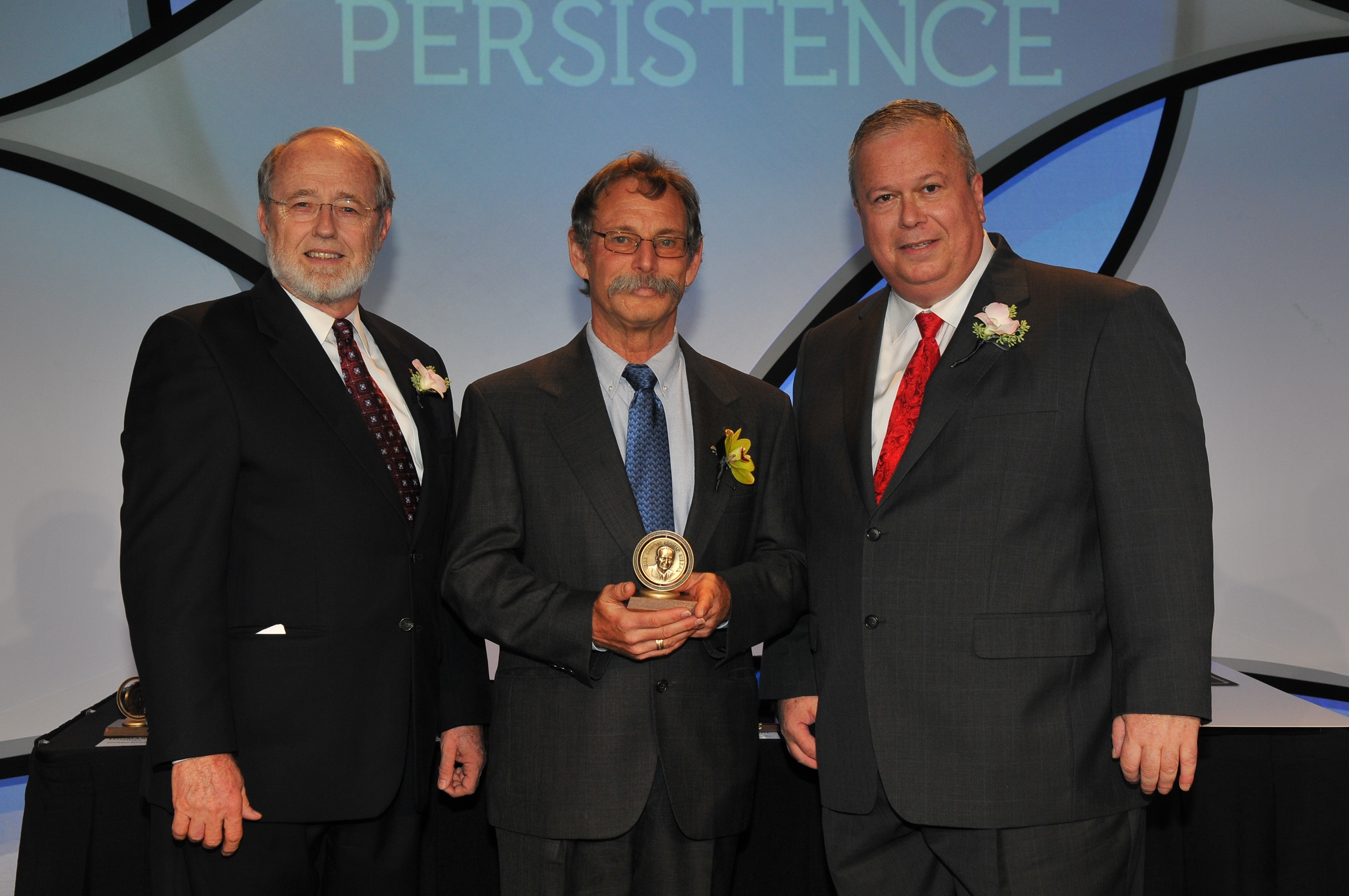
IEEE Simon Ramo Medal for Systems Engineering and Systems Science

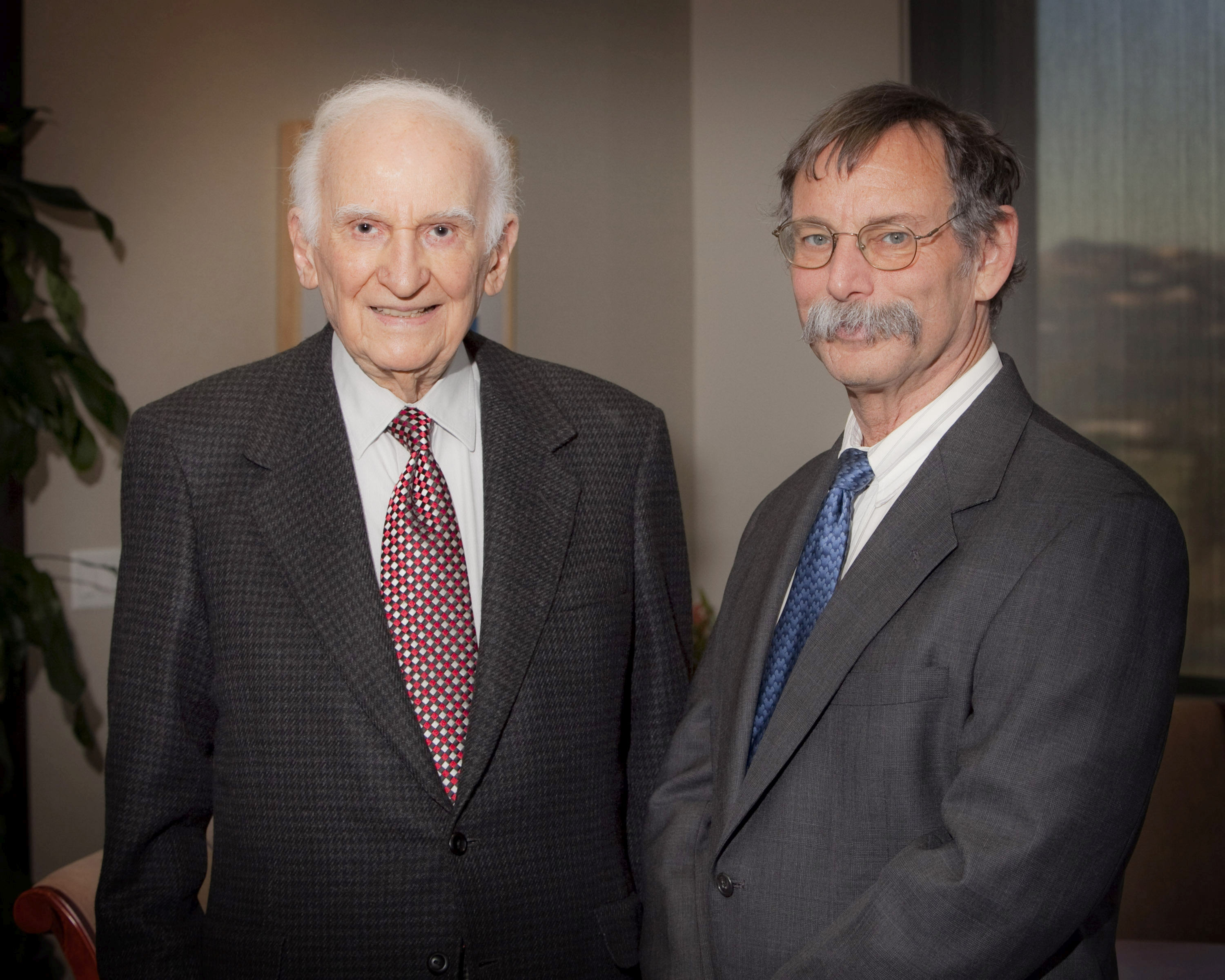
With Simon Ramo, on the occasion of receiving the Ramo Medal, 2011

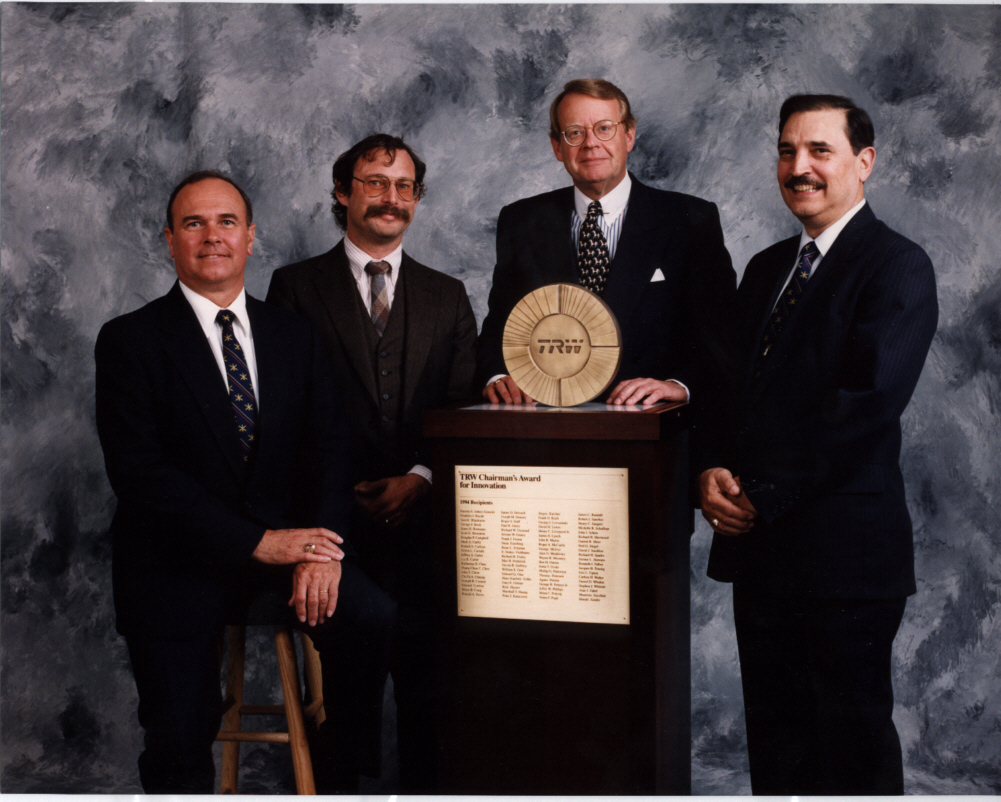
TRW Chairman's Award for Innovation; Dr. Siegel received this award 3 separate times

Siegel has received a number of awards and honors, including:

- The U.S. National Medal of Technology and Innovation in 2023.
- Election to the US National Academy of Engineering in 2005.
- Election as a fellow of the International Core Academy of Sciences and Humanities in 2026.
- Selection as an IEEE Fellow (2011).
- The IEEE Simon Ramo Medal (2011), for systems engineering and systems science.
- Member (2017) and Fellow (2019), National Academy of Inventors.
- US Army Honorable Order of Saint Barbara, 1996.
- iCMG award for system architecture (2011)
- Northern Virginia Technology Council—CTO of the year award (2011)
- National Medal of Technology and Innovation (2023)

Additional awards are listed on his website, https://neilsiegel.usc.edu/awards/.

== Consumer electronics, and the first wireless internet ==
Siegel has had a major impact on the design and capabilities of many types of mobile consumer electronics, including smart phones, GPS receivers, and so forth. He is the documented earliest creator of a complete, operating adaptation of the internet to fully-routed wireless operation, and many important / related technologies that are widely used today in such wireless devices, including:

- GPS-enabled mobile devices
- Automatic orientation of a map display to match the geographic cardinal points (US Patent 5,672,840)
- Optimizing unicast protocols (including TCP) for use on low-bandwidth, wireless networks (US Patent 6,701,375)
- Performing many security administrative and control tasks remotely (US Patent 7,278,023)
- Managing and administering a large network of wireless devices (US Patent 6,212,559)
- Increasing battery life on GPS-enabled devices (US Patent 7,256,731)

== Personal life ==
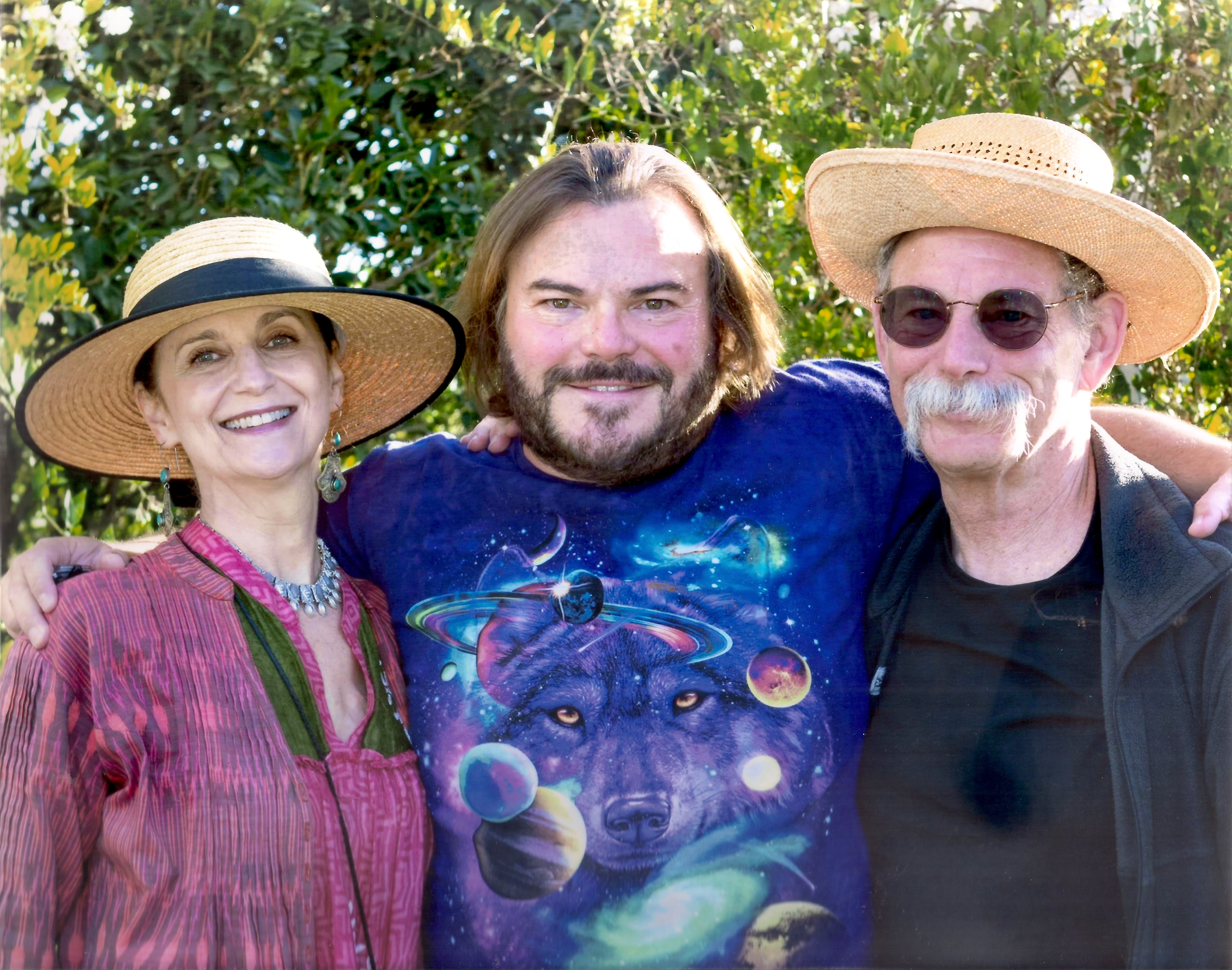
Robyn Friend, Jack Black, and Neil Siegel at a Trinity Hospice Foundation fund-raising event in 2019

Siegel is an experienced musician who plays the flute, târ, ney, and kaval who has more than 1,500 concerts to his credit worldwide. He studied music with Iranian Sufi master Morteza Varzi for more than 20 years. He is a long-time member of Professional Musicians Local 47, American Federation of Musicians, AFL-CIO.

He is married to Robyn Friend, a dancer, painter, writer, and singer, with whom he has performed all over the world during the last 30 years.

He is the older half-brother of actor, singer, and comedian Jack Black, with whom he has collaborated on a number of fund-raising events for charity, most notably the pediatric hospice program of the TrinityCare Hospice, based in Torrance, California.

He is on the board of several non-profit organizations, including the Providence Trinity Health Care Hospice Foundation, the Electric Infrastructure Security Council, and The Institute of Persian Performing Arts. Since 2013, he and his wife, Robyn, have operated their own charitable organization, The Siegel and Friend Foundation.
