= Jan Lewan =

Band leader and Ponzi schemer

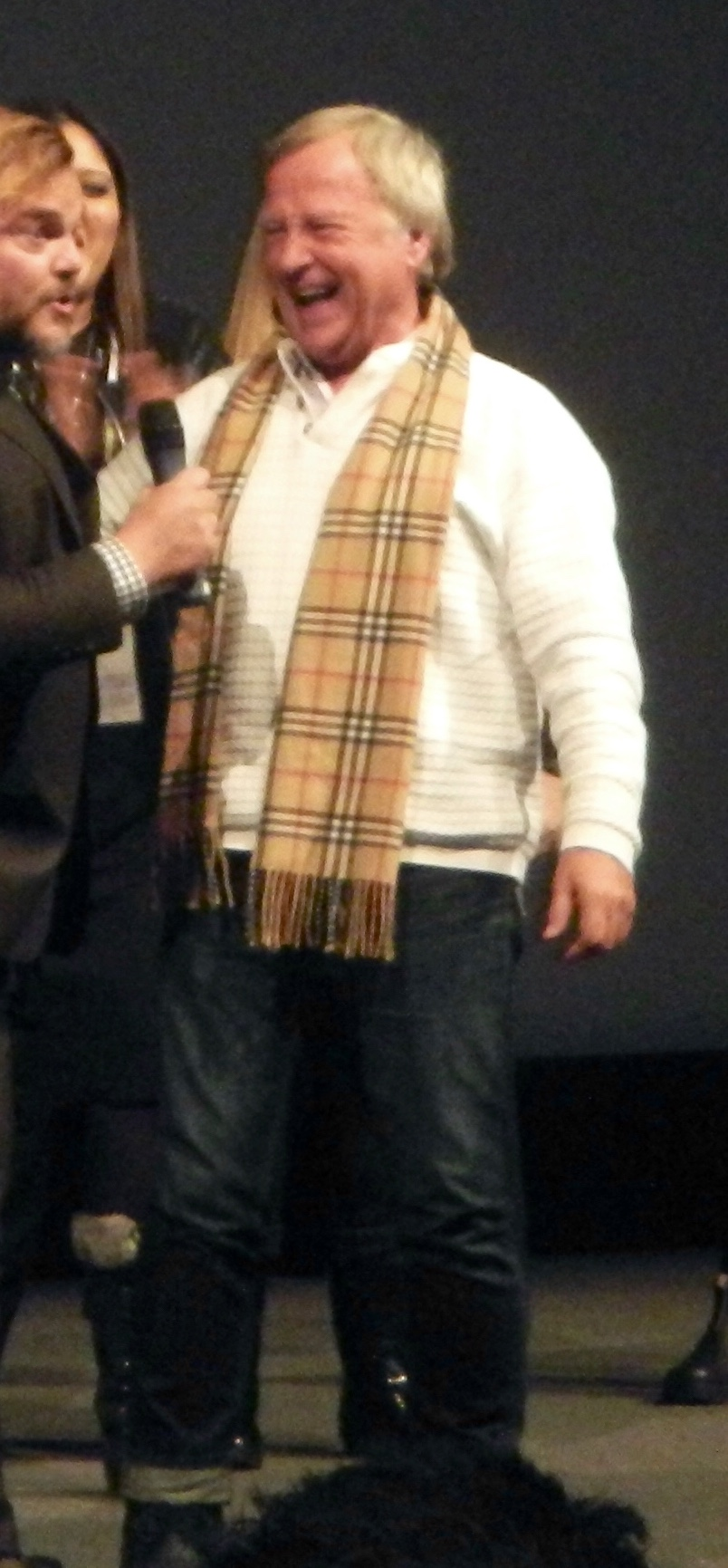
- Lewan at Sundance Film Festival in 2017
- Born: Jan Lewandowski; August 15, 1941 (age 84); Bromberg, Reichsgau Danzig-West Prussia, German Reich
- Other names: Polka King, Dowski
- Occupations: Songwriter, Polka band leader and Tour Guide
- Criminal charges: Mail and wire fraud, securities fraud, money laundering, racketeering
- Criminal penalty: concurrent: 5 years 11 months (Federal); 7 years (New Jersey)
- Criminal status: imprisonment completed in 2009
- Children: 2

Jan Lewandowski (Polish pronunciation: [lɛvanˈdɔfskʲi]; born 15 August 1941 in Bydgoszcz, Poland) known professionally as Jan Lewan, is a Polish-American songwriter and polka band leader. The Grammy Award-nominated musician was convicted of fraud charges in 2004, for financial crimes described by The Morning Call as a "classic Ponzi scheme".

Lewan's life has been depicted in multiple films, first in the 2007 TV documentary Mystery of the Polka King, the 2009 documentary film The Man Who Would Be Polka King, and the 2017 American comedy film The Polka King, in which Lewandowski is portrayed by Jack Black, which was released on Netflix on January 12, 2018.

== Early life ==
Information on Lewan's early life is found primarily on his official website, which states that Lewan was born in Bydgoszcz in northern Poland in 1941 during the German occupation of the country during World War II. As a young child Lewan loved music and enrolled in Conservatory of Music in Gdańsk. He also sang in an opera. Lewan served in the Central Polish Army for several years as all young men in Poland were obliged to do at the time. Lewan played in music halls across Poland and Northern Europe including the National Philharmonic in Warsaw. He did not get interested in polka until after his emigration, as polka music is not highly preferred in Poland. After Lewan came to the United States, he met his first wife, Rhonda Lewan, during a telethon. They divorced in 2011. Rhonda then married Steve Saive, the former trumpet player of Jan Lewan's polka band.

== Career ==
After his career in Europe, Lewan moved to the United States via Canada in 1972. He settled in Northeastern Pennsylvania, where he continued his polka career. He was a main part in the foundation of Pennsylvania Polka on PCN. During this time Lewan toured frequently. Notable tours were to Poland, Ireland, Italy, Germany, France, Belgium, England, Israel, Russia, Greece, Egypt, and Ukraine.

He created a polka-oriented orchestra and recorded several albums. Lewan's self-titled album, Jan Lewan and His Orchestra, was nominated for a Grammy in 1995. Lewan went on to perform even bigger polka shows in the prestigious Las Vegas Hilton Showroom, Las Vegas Sands Convention Center, and Atlantic City's Trump Plaza Hotel and Casino, Atlantis Hotel and Casino, and Trump Castle Hotel Casino.

Lewan's legacy was the focal point of the 2007 TV documentary Mystery of Polka King, its 2009 documentary film follow-up, The Man Who Would Be Polka King, as well as the 2017 comedy film The Polka King in which Lewan is portrayed by Jack Black.

== Legal issues ==
Lewan owned and operated a gift shop in Hazleton, Pennsylvania. When he would tour back in Poland, he would often bring back items to sell in the store or have them exported to the States, in particular amber jewelry. To support the store, he also sold shares in the business and promised returns of 12 and 20 percent to investors, many of whom had traveled with him. Officials from the Commonwealth of Pennsylvania warned him to stop selling securities as he had not gone through legal channels. Lewan feigned obedience to the order by terminating that corporation, while covertly continuing his "abandoned" program by filing a new corporate entity.

In 2004, Lewan was arrested for defrauding some 400 people in 22 states of millions of dollars. Lewan was sentenced to five years and 11 months imprisonment by a federal court judge as well as a seven-year sentence in New Jersey, which were served concurrently. Lewan was prosecuted by the New Jersey Division of Criminal Justice. The case was handled by Deputy Attorney General Francine Pozner-Ehrenberg. Lewan was sentenced by the Mercer County Superior Court on Money Laundering and Securities Fraud charges.

While in prison in Delaware in 2004, Lewan was stabbed in the neck by a cellmate. He was hospitalized for several days as a result. The assailant was found guilty of assault with a deadly weapon and sentenced to an additional 15 years. The motive for the attack was never determined, but Lewan garnered little sympathy, with the defrauded remarking that the assault was deserved and disappointed that the assailant did not succeed at killing Lewan. Lewan was released from prison in 2009.

== Awards and honors ==
=== List of awards nominations ===
Year	Award	Result	Ref(s)
1995	Grammy Award for Best Polka Album	Nominated	

== Vehicle accident ==
On January 26, 2001, Lewan's tour bus crashed en route to Florida for six shows. Two of his musicians were killed. Lewan, along with his son Daniel, an aspiring musician, had both been hospitalized, with Daniel's condition being critical and remanded to intensive care. Steve Saive, the band's trumpeter, had been behind the wheel at the time of the accident.
