= Judith Love Cohen =

American aerospace engineer (1933–2016)

- Cohen in 1959
- Born: August 16, 1933; Brooklyn, New York, U.S.
- Died: July 25, 2016 (aged 82); Culver City, California, U.S.
- Burial place: Eden Memorial Park Cemetery
- Other names: Judith Love Siegel; Judith Love Black; Judith Love Katz
- Occupations: Aerospace engineer Author; Ballerina
- Years active: 1952–2016
- Spouses: Bernard Siegel; Tom Black; David A. Katz
- Children: 4, including Neil and Jack

Judith Love Cohen (August 16, 1933 – July 25, 2016) was an American aerospace engineer. She was an electrical engineer on the Minuteman missile, the science ground station for the Hubble Space Telescope, the Tracking and Data Relay Satellite, and the Apollo Space Program. In particular, her work on the Abort-Guidance System is credited with helping save Apollo 13. After her retirement from engineering, she founded a children's multimedia publishing company, eventually publishing more than 20 titles before her death in 2016. She was the mother of computer scientist and engineer Neil Siegel and actor-musician Jack Black.

== Early life and education ==
Cohen was born into a Jewish family in Brooklyn, New York, the daughter of Sarah Cohen (née Roisman) and Morris Bernard Cohen. By fifth grade, her classmates were paying her to do their math homework. She was often the only girl in her math classes, and decided she wanted to become a math teacher. By age 19, she was studying engineering in college, and dancing ballet in the Metropolitan Opera Ballet company in New York.

She received a scholarship to Brooklyn College to major in math, but realized she preferred engineering. After two years at Brooklyn College, Cohen married and moved to California, working as a junior engineer for North American Aviation, attending the University of Southern California (USC) at night; she said that she went through both her BS and MS programs at USC without ever meeting another female engineering student. She received both her bachelor's and master's degrees from USC Viterbi School of Engineering, in 1957 and 1962 respectively, and continued her association with the university, serving as an Astronautical Engineering Advisory board member.

In 1982, she became a graduate of the UCLA Engineering Executive Program.

== Career ==
Cohen's engineering career began in 1952, when she worked as a junior engineer at North American Aviation. After graduation from USC Viterbi School of Engineering in 1957, she went on to work at Space Technology Laboratories. Space Technology Laboratories eventually became TRW (acquired by Northrop Grumman in 2002). She stayed with the company until her retirement in 1990. Her engineering work included work on the guidance computer for the Minuteman missile and the Abort-Guidance System (AGS) in the Apollo Lunar Module. The AGS played an important role in the safe return of Apollo 13 after an oxygen tank explosion left the Service Module crippled and forced the astronauts to use the Lunar Module as a "lifeboat." Supplies of electrical power and water on the LM were limited and the Primary Guidance and Navigation System used too much water for cooling. As a result, after a major LM descent engine burn two hours past its closest approach to the Moon to shorten the trip home, the AGS was used for most of the return, including two mid-course corrections.^{pp. III-17,32,35,40} According to her son Neil:

My mother usually considered her work on the Apollo program to be the highlight of her career. When disaster struck the Apollo 13 mission, it was the Abort-Guidance System that brought the astronauts home safely. Judy was there when the Apollo 13 astronauts paid a 'thank you' to the TRW facility in Redondo Beach.

In 1990, after retiring from practice as an engineer, she began a publishing company called Cascade Pass with her third husband, David Katz. They published two series of books:

- The "You Can be a Woman … " series encourages young girls to learn about science and engineering
- The "Green" series focuses on promoting positive environmental practices, aimed at young children.

Cascade Pass has sold more than 100,000 of their children's books in these two series.

Cascade Pass also published a book called The Women of Apollo (written by Robyn Friend, Cohen's daughter-in-law), which features short biographies of four women who helped put the first man on the moon, Cohen among them.

== Selected honors ==
- May 2014, IEEE-USA Distinguished Literary Contributions Award – for her work with STEM for children

== Personal life ==
In the early 1950s, Cohen married fellow engineer Bernard Siegel, whom she met while a freshman in engineering school at Brooklyn College in Brooklyn, New York. They had three children: engineer/scientist Neil Siegel, Howard Siegel, and Rachel Siegel. The couple divorced in the mid-1960s.

Cohen married Thomas "Tom" William Black, who converted to Judaism for her. In 1969, Cohen had her fourth child, who would grow to become actor and musician Jack Black. In a memorial tribute, her son Neil notes that she was troubleshooting problems with schematics on the day she went into labor, called her boss to let him know she had fixed the problem and then delivered Jack. The couple divorced in 1979.

In 1981, Cohen married David A. Katz. They remained married until her death in 2016.

In 1989, Cohen's son Howard died of AIDS at the age of 31.

Cohen died of cancer in 2016.

== Selected works and publications ==
- A Clean series
  - (2007). A Clean Sky: The Global Warming Story. (with Robyn Friend) ISBN 978-1-880599-81-5
    - (2007). Un Cielo Limpio: La Historia del Calentamiento Global (in Spanish) (with Robyn Friend) ISBN 978-1-880599-83-9
  - (2008). A Clean City: The Green Construction Story. (with Robyn Friend) ISBN 1-880599-84-8
  - (2009). A Clean Planet: The Solar Power Story. (with Robyn Friend) ISBN 978-1-880599-86-0
  - (2011). A Clean Earth: The Geothermal Story. (with Robyn Friend) ISBN 978-1-880599-98-3
  - (2012). A Cleaner Port. A Brighter Future. The Greening of the Port of Los Angeles. (with Robyn Friend, Lee Rathbone, and David Katz) ISBN 978-1-935999-00-3
  - (2015). Future Engineering: The Clean Water Challenge. (with Robyn Friend) ISBN 978-1-935999-08-9
  - (2015). Los Angeles' Clean Energy Future. (with Robyn Friend and David Katz) ISBN 978-1-935999-09-6
  - (2015). Los Angeles' Water Future. (with Robyn Friend and David Katz) ISBN 978-1-935999-11-9
- You Can Be series
  - 2005: You Can Be a Woman Makeup Artist or Costume Designer (with Robyn Friend) ISBN 978-1-880599-76-1
  - 2004: You Can Be a Woman Animator (with Vicky Jenson) ISBN 978-1-880599-70-9
  - 1992: You Can Be a Woman Architect ISBN 978-1-880599-04-4
  - 1995: You Can Be a Woman Astronomer ISBN 978-1-880599-17-4
  - 1999: You Can Be a Woman Basketball Player ISBN 978-1-880599-40-2
  - 1999: You Can Be a Woman Botanist ISBN 978-1-880599-31-0
  - 1996: You Can Be a Woman Cardiologist ISBN 978-1-880599-18-1
  - 2005: You Can Be a Woman Chemist ISBN 978-1-880599-72-3
  - 1999: You Can Be a Woman Egyptologist ISBN 978-1-880599-45-7
  - 1995: You Can Be a Woman Engineer ISBN 978-1-880599-19-8 ASIN B00LLQL2TK
  - 2002: You Can Be a Woman Entomologist ISBN 978-1-880599-60-0
  - 2005: You Can Be a Woman Video Game Producer ISBN 978-1-880599-73-0
  - 2003: You Can Be a Woman Movie Maker (with Mary McLaglen, Maureen Gosling and Paula Weinstein) ISBN 1-880599-63-5
  - 2001: You Can Be a Woman Marine Biologist ISBN 978-1-880599-53-2
  - 2002: You Can Be a Woman Meteorologist ISBN 978-1-880599-58-7
  - 1994: You Can Be a Woman Oceanographer (with Sharon E. Franks, Sharon Roth Franks) ISBN 978-1-880599-66-2
  - 1993: You Can Be a Woman Paleontologist ISBN 978-1-880599-43-3
  - 2000: You Can Be a Woman Soccer Player (with Tisha Lea Venturini) ISBN 978-1-880599-49-5
  - 2000: You Can Be a Woman Softball Player ISBN 978-1-880599-47-1
  - 1992: You Can Be a Woman Zoologist ISBN 978-1-880599-56-3
- Tu Puedes Ser series
  - Tu Puedes Ser Una Ingeniera
  - Tu Puedes Ser Una Arquitecta
  - Tu Puedes Ser Biologa Marina
  - Tu Puedes Ser Una Zoologa
  - Tu Puedes Ser Una Oceanografa
- Other
  - Friend, Robyn C.; Cohen, Judith Love; Katz, David A. (illustrations); Rathbone, Lee (editing) (2012). Electricity and You: Be Smart, Be Safe. Marina del Rey, CA: Cascade Pass. ISBN 978-1-935999-02-7. OCLC 803961217.
