= Mortezâ Varzi =

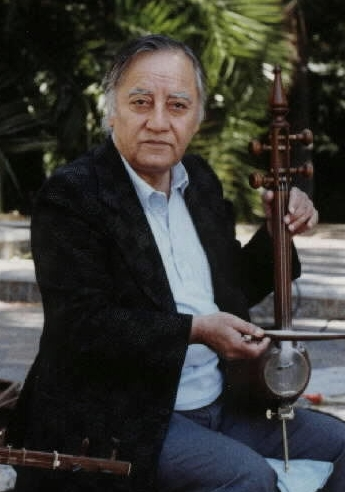

Background information
- Born: December 30, 1922; Tehran, Iran
- Died: January 3, 2004 (aged 81) Tehran, Iran
- Occupation: Musician
- Instruments: Kamancheh, setar, tar
- Formerly of: Bâhâri; Oshâgh

Mortezâ Varzi (December 30, 1922 – January 3, 2004) was an Iranian musician.

== Biography ==
He was born in Tehran of an artistically inclined family. He started his music lessons on the violin at age 15 with Morteza Neidavoud, one of the greatest Persian instrumentalists of the twentieth century. After his father advised him to play music on a traditional Persian instrument, he began studying setar with master Nasratollah Zarrin Panjeh, and kamancheh with master Ali-Asghar Bahari.

When he was young, he lived across the street from Gholam Hossein Banan, the greatest Persian traditional singer of the day, who also helped him learn about Persian poetry, and how to fit the poetry to the music.

After finishing college with a degree in economics, Varzi was employed by the Iranian government, traveling throughout the world, conducting official business in Japan, the Philippines, India, China, the UK, and the United States. During his official duties, he represented the Iranian government at forums such as the CENTO Symposium on Decentralization of Government.

He undertook post-graduate studies in Finance and Personnel Management in the United States, and in Public Administration in the UK.

Later, after attaining high office at the Iranian State Railroad and at the Iranian Ministry of the Interior (where his posts included Governor of the Province of Sari, Director of Planning and Studies, Director General of Plans and Studies, Director General of Organization and Method, Consultant to the Minister of the Interior, and executive director of the Iran Municipal Association), he spent his free time collecting Iranian musical recordings, and researching Persian classical and folkloric music.

Ostād Varzi was a follower of Persian mysticism, or ‘erfān, and his musical practice reflects this philosophy. In Iran, he attended the khāneqāh of Nur Bakhsh, who was the spiritual leader (pir) of a mystical order in Tehran.

In 1979, Varzi took up residence in the United States, promoting Persian music and culture, and instructing both Iranians and Americans in the Persian classical musical repertoire. To this end, he founded the non-profit Institute of Persian Performing Arts in 1985. He was also the founder of the Bâhâri (with Peggy Caton, Robyn Friend, Massoud Modirian, and Neil Siegel) and Oshâgh (with Kazem Alemi, Mr. Tehrani, and Reza Torshizi) musical ensembles. In 1986, he was recognized by the United States National Endowment for the Arts as a master teacher and performer.

He had hundreds of students – learning kamancheh, setar, tar, radif (Persian repertoire), Persian singing, Persian classical poetry – who came to study with him from all over the world. He also provided many opportunities for his students to meet and work with other masters of Persian music.

His translations of the poetry of Hafez, created and interpreted in collaboration with his long-time friend and student Margaret Caton, were published by Mazda in 2008.

Ostâd Varzi died in Tehran, Iran, on 3 January 2004 (13th of Dey Maahe 1382), shortly after his 81st birthday. An appreciation by one of his students can be read here:

== See also ==
- Music of Iran
- List of Iranian musicians
