= Dolls House Emporium =

Online retailer (founded 1979)

- Company type: Retail
- Industry: Hobbies
- Founded: 1979
- Headquarters: United Kingdom
- Products: Wooden dolls' houses and accessories
- Number of employees: 4
- Parent: SafeShip Fulfilment Ltd
- Website: http://www.dollshouse.com

The Dolls House Emporium is an online retailer supplying 1:12th scale dolls houses (known as dollhouses in the USA) and 1:12th scale and 1:24th scale miniature collectables. They no longer design or manufacture products themselves.

It distributes miniatures worldwide via its website. The site offers more than 6,000 items of dolls house furniture, plus the houses themselves.

It trades around the world and e-business methods are tapping markets in the UK, USA, Canada and Australia with web portals dealing with local currency, pricing and shipping.

It was founded in 1979 by Jackie Lee and her then husband Adam Purser.

Television companies and creative agencies regularly use Dolls House Emporium products in their work. For instance Montgomery Hall was used as a prop in Upstairs Downstairs on the BBC in 2012. Miniature accessories were used in the 20th Century Fox film Gulliver's Travels in 2010.

== History ==
The original range comprised three 1:24 scale model kits of timber-framed buildings sold B2C via direct response advertising. There were few accessories available at 1:24 scale but an emerging 1:12 dolls’ house market and good quality miniatures becoming available from Taiwan, encouraged collecting and repeat business.

In February 2013 the company was sold to internet retailer and magazine publisher MyTime Media, on the retirement of founder Jackie Lee and the new firm relocated warehousing to Peterborough and thereafter to Queenborough in Kent.

=== Expansion ===
In 1983 The Dolls House Emporium moved to converted farm buildings in Denby, Derbyshire, starting with one unit and by 1992 occupying five units with a manufacturing workshop, warehousing, offices and shop.

In 1988 the first imports were purchased direct from the factories in Taiwan and China (via Hong Kong), and the company started selling B2B as well as B2C, attending its first trade exhibition with a stand at the British Toy and Hobby Fair in 1988 showcasing the Queen Anne House. It was such a success that several were immediately despatched to Saks Fifth Avenue in New York City.

In 2015, the company moved to its current premises in Queenborough, Kent.

=== Awards ===
2012: Outstanding Customer Relationship Management & Customer Service: ECMOD Direct Commerce Awards.

2011: Outstanding Customer Service: ECMOD (European Catalogue and Mail Order Days) Direct Commerce Awards.

2007: Orchard House is 'Highly Commended' Right Start toy awards.

== Model kit product ranges ==
The Dolls' House Emporium sells over 30 miniature homes. Discontinued models and previous catalogues have become collector's items.

In 2011 the company won a licence to reproduce replicas of the miniature items from Queen Mary's Dolls' House at Windsor Castle. They were launched in 2012.
