= The Women of Apollo =

2006 book by Robyn C. Friend

The Women of the Apollo
- Author: Robyn C. Friend
- Illustrator: David Katz
- Language: English
- Genre: Illustrated children's book
- Published: 2006 (Cascade Pass)
- Publication place: United States
- Pages: 65
- ISBN: 9781880599808

The Women of Apollo is a book written by Robyn C. Friend, illustrated by David Katz, about 4 women who participated in the United States space program during the Apollo Program.

== Participants ==
Female members of the Apollo Space Program included Bobbie Johnson, Judith Love Cohen, Ann Dickson, and Ann Maybury. Apollo 11 landed on the Moon on July 20, 1969.

=== Judith Love Cohen ===
Judy worked as an electrical engineer on the abort guidance system of the Apollo Program. The abort guidance system was used during the Apollo 13 mission to safely return the astronauts to the Earth after an explosion disabled many of the spacecraft's capabilities, including the regular guidance system.

=== Ann Dickson ===
Ann Dickson aspired to be an astronaut, but she never acquired the 600 hours of flying time necessary to qualify.

=== Margaret Heafield Hamilton ===
Margaret Hamilton (born August 17, 1936)^{[1]} was a computer scientist, systems engineer and business owner. She was Director of the Software Engineering Division^{[2]} of the MIT Instrumentation Laboratory, which developed on-board flight software for Apollo.^{[3]} In 1986, she became the founder and CEO of Hamilton Technologies, Inc., in Cambridge, Massachusetts. The company was developed around the Universal Systems Language based on her paradigm of Development Before the Fact (DBTF) for systems and software design.^{[4]}

Hamilton published over 130 papers, proceedings and reports about the 60 projects and six major programs in which she was involved.

Eventually, she became director of the Software Engineering Division of the MIT Instrumentation Laboratory. This division was responsible for developing the computer and software used on the Apollo 11 mission, under contract to NASA.
