= Force XXI Battle Command Brigade and Below =

Linux-based military communication platform

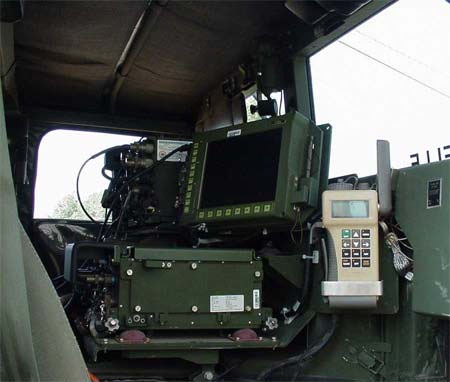
FBCB2 computer and display mounted in a HMMWV

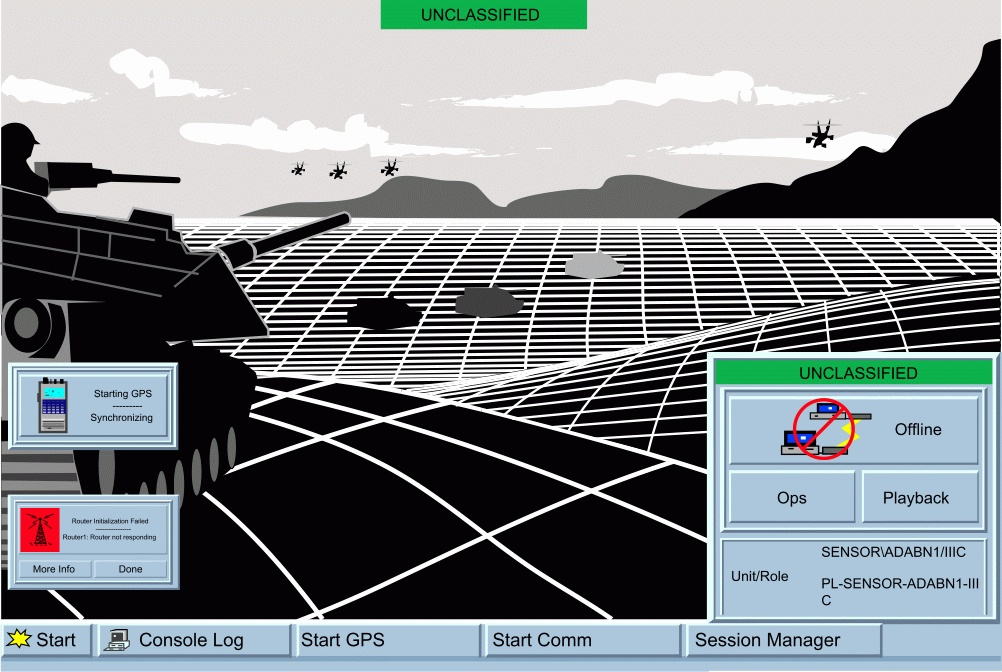
FBCB2 Session Manager

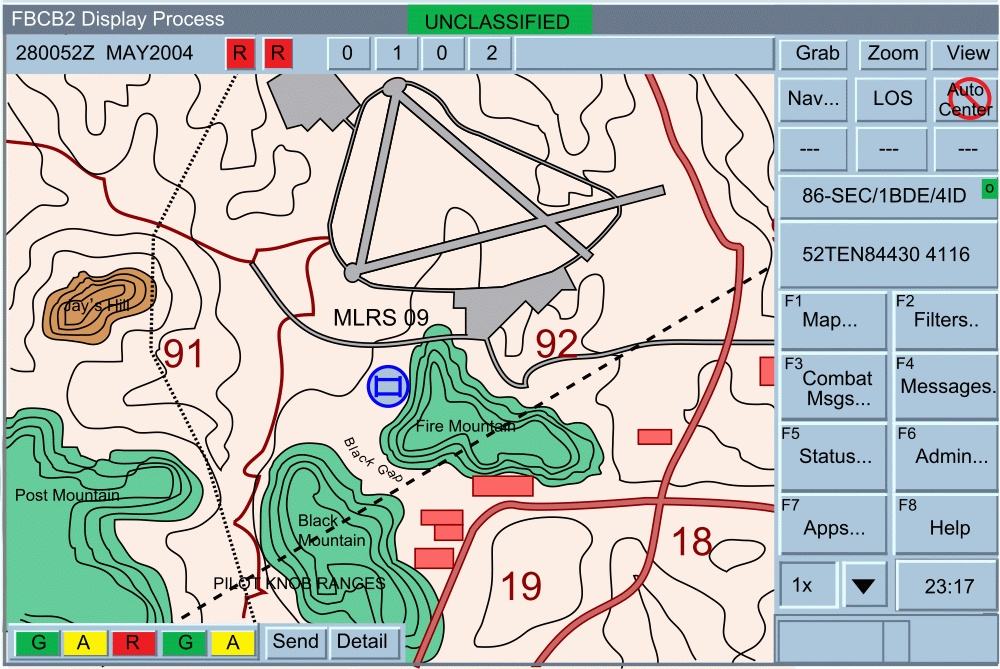
FBCB2 Operations Session

Force XXI Battle Command Brigade and Below (FBCB2) is a communication platform designed for commanders to track friendly and hostile forces on the battlefield. It increases a vehicle commander's situational awareness of the battlefield by gathering information near real-time based on vehicle locations being updated on the battlefield. This information is viewed graphically, and exchanged via both free and fixed text message formats (instead of verbal collection of reports).

The location data for friendly forces is collected through the Enhanced Position Location Reporting System (EPLRS) line of sight tactical radio network and blue force tracking (BFT) satellite network.

== Development ==
The development of the system is managed by Project Manager, Force XXI Battle Command Brigade and Below, a component of the U.S. Army's Program Executive Office – Command Control and Communications Tactical (PEO C3T). PEO C3T is based at Aberdeen Proving Ground in Aberdeen, Maryland. The original Army Program Executive Officer was William Campbell (LtG, ret). The original contractor program manager was Neil Siegel.

FBCB2 was tested under the First Digitized Division 4th Infantry Division (United States) based in Fort Hood, Texas, and 1/25 infantry out of Fort Lewis, Washington. series of what were called "Advanced Warfighting Experiments" at the National Training Center near Barstow, California, starting in 1997. The division conducted Limited User Test on the equipment in 1998, and the system was approved for production.

FBCB2 was then tested and implemented under the Force XXI concept that stemmed from Operation Desert Storm/Shield.

The United States Army and the United States Marines Corps reached agreement to standardize on a new variant of the system to be called Joint Capabilities Release (JCR) developed by the Project Manager, Joint Battle Command-Platform (PM JBC-P) that was fielded in 2013. JCR takes advantage of the BFT-2 network, a new satellite infrastructure that can handle significantly more data than the first BFT.

== Deployment ==
The United States Army awarded TRW (that became a part of Northrop Grumman in 2002) the prime contract for FBCB2 in 1995. ESP (Engineering Solutions and Products) is now the prime contractor for the system.

FBCB2 was first used in actual military operations in the former Yugoslavia in 1998. It played a key role in operations in Iraq and Afghanistan starting in 2003. Work has begun on plans to reach the level of nearly 160,000 tracking systems in the Army within a few years.

== Awards ==
The FBCB2 system, and the BFT system have won numerous awards and accolades, including: recognition in 2001 as one of the five best-managed software programs in the entire U.S. Government, the 2003 Institute for Defense and Government Advancement's award for most innovative U.S. Government program, the 2003 Federal Computer Week Monticello Award (given in recognition of an information system that has a direct, meaningful impact on human lives), and the Battlespace Information 2005 "Best Program in Support of Coalition Operations".

== See also ==
- Blue Force Tracking
- Program Executive Office Command Control and Communications Tactical

== Notes ==
- "Force XXI Battle Command Brigrade and Below (FBCB2)" (PDF). University XXI. 2001-01-23. Archived from the original on 2005-11-09. "Provides the Power of the Network to Share Situational Awareness (SA) and Command and Control (C2) Information Toward the Efficient Use of Resources within the Enemy's Decision Cycle"
  at, University of Texas at Austin, and Texas A&M University
- "Forward Area Air Defense Command, Control, Communications and Intelligence (FAAD C3I)". Global Security. "FAADC3I provides the battle captains the tools necessary to pierce the fog of battle, and the ability to place the correct size force, at the correct location, at the critical time needed to defeat enemy air threats"
