= Jack Black =

American actor, comedian, and musician (born 1969)

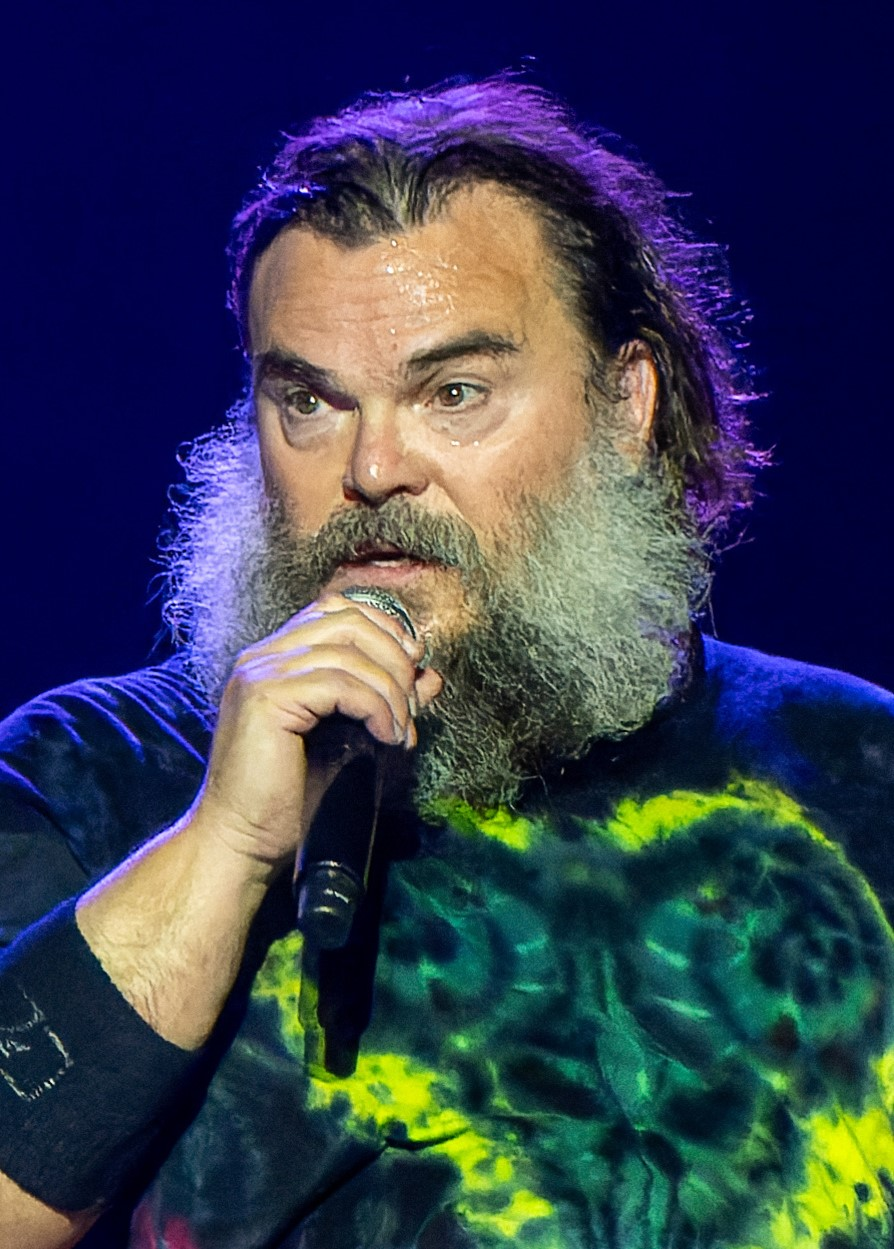
- Black in 2023
- Born: Thomas Jacob Black; August 28, 1969 (age 57); Santa Monica, California, U.S.
- Other names: JB; Jables; Jablinski; Jackalous McBlackelby
- Occupations: Actor; comedian; singer; songwriter
- Years active: 1982–present
- Works: Filmography
- Spouse: Tanya Haden (m. 2006)
- Partner: Laura Kightlinger (1996–2005)
- Children: 2
- Mother: Judith Love Cohen
- Relatives: Neil Siegel (half-brother)
- Musical career
- Genres: Comedy rock; acoustic rock; hard rock; heavy metal
- Instruments: Vocals; guitar
- Member of: Tenacious D

YouTube information
- Channel: JablinskiGames
- Years active: 2018–present
- Genres: Let's Play; vlog
- Subscribers: 5.11 million
- Views: 241.9 million
- Last updated: January 2, 2025

Thomas Jacob Black (born August 28, 1969) is an American actor, comedian, and musician. He has played leading roles in family and comedy films, in addition to his voice work in animated features. His accolades include an Emmy Award, a Grammy Award, and nominations for two Critics' Choice Awards and three Golden Globe Awards. In 2018, he was awarded a star on the Hollywood Walk of Fame.

Black began acting at age 13, and his early films include Dead Man Walking (1995), The Cable Guy (1996), Mars Attacks! (1996) and Enemy of the State (1998). He gained recognition for starring in the romantic comedy High Fidelity (2000), which led to substantial roles in films like Shallow Hal (2001) and Orange County (2002). He established himself as a leading man with a starring role in the musical comedy School of Rock (2003), earning a nomination for the Golden Globe for Best Actor. He then starred in the films King Kong (2005), The Holiday (2006), Nacho Libre (2006) and Tropic Thunder (2008). Also in 2008, he began voicing Po in the Kung Fu Panda franchise.

Black was critically praised for portraying Bernie Tiede in the biographical thriller film Bernie (2011), receiving several Best Actor award nominations. Following career fluctuations, he experienced a resurgence with roles in Goosebumps (2016), Jumanji: Welcome to the Jungle (2017), The House with a Clock in Its Walls (2018), Jumanji: The Next Level (2019) and A Minecraft Movie (2025). He also voiced Bowser in The Super Mario Bros. Movie (2023) and its sequel, receiving a nomination for the Golden Globe for Best Original Song for the former.

Outside of acting, Black formed the comedy musical duo Tenacious D with long-time friend Kyle Gass in 1994; they have won one Grammy for Best Metal Performance. Since 2018, he has run a YouTube channel called Jablinski Games.

== Early life ==
Thomas Jacob Black was born in Santa Monica, California, on August 28, 1969, the son of satellite engineers Thomas William Black and Judith Love Cohen. He was raised in Hermosa Beach, California. His mother worked on the Minuteman nuclear missile guidance system, the Apollo lunar module guidance system, and the science ground station for the Hubble Space Telescope, and was also a writer. He has three older half-siblings through his mother: scientist Neil Siegel, Howard Siegel, and Rachel Siegel. His mother was born Jewish, to a family from Poland and Russia. His father converted to Judaism, and is of German, English, Irish, and Scottish descent. Black was raised Jewish, attending Hebrew school and had a bar mitzvah.

Despite being named Thomas, a name his family has used since his ancestors lived in Ireland, his parents called him Jack as a nickname instead.

Black's parents divorced when he was 10, and his father then stopped practicing Judaism. Black moved to Culver City with his father and frequently visited his mother's home. For high school, Black's parents enrolled him at the Poseidon School, a private secondary school designed for students struggling in the traditional school system. He also attended the Crossroads School, where he excelled in drama. He later attended University of California, Los Angeles (UCLA), but dropped out during his second year to pursue a career in entertainment. Fellow UCLA student Tim Robbins later cast Black in Bob Roberts. In 1995 and 1996, he gained recurring roles in the HBO sketch comedy series Mr. Show.

== Acting career ==
=== Early roles ===
In 1982, Black's first acting job was in a television commercial for the video game Pitfall! at age 13. In 1987, Black joined the Actors' Gang, a theater troupe founded by UCLA students including Tim Robbins, and appeared in a variety of stage productions. Black's adult career began with small roles on prime time television, including Life Goes On, Northern Exposure, Mr. Show, Picket Fences, The Golden Palace, and The X-Files. Black appeared in the unaired TV pilot Heat Vision and Jack, directed by Ben Stiller, in which he played an ex-astronaut pursued by actor Ron Silver. He was accompanied by his friend who had merged with a motorcycle, voiced by Owen Wilson. After Tim Robbins cast him in Bob Roberts (1992), Black began appearing in small film roles such as Airborne (1993), Demolition Man (1993), Waterworld (1995), Dead Man Walking (1995), The Cable Guy (1996), The Fan (1996), Mars Attacks! (1996), Crossworlds (1996), The Jackal (1997), Enemy of the State (1998), and others. He had a small role in True Romance (1993) as a security guard, but the scene was deleted.

=== 2000s ===
In 2000, Black co-starred in the film High Fidelity as a wild employee in a record store run by John Cusack. Black considers his role in High Fidelity as his breakout into the Hollywood scene. He quickly gained leading roles in films such as Saving Silverman (2001), Shallow Hal (2001), Orange County (2002), and Gulliver's Travels (2010). He received particular praise for his starring role in the well-received School of Rock (2003), earning critical acclaim and a Golden Globe nomination for Best Actor – Musical or Comedy. Black took part in the Who Wants to Be a Millionaire? celebrity edition, along with Denis Leary, Jimmy Kimmel, and others, and was handed the prize of US$125,000 in October 2001. He has also had starring voice-overs in animated features, including Zeke in Ice Age (2002) and Lenny in Shark Tale (2004). In 2004, Black guest-starred in the first episode of Cartoon Network's Adult Swim show Tom Goes to the Mayor.

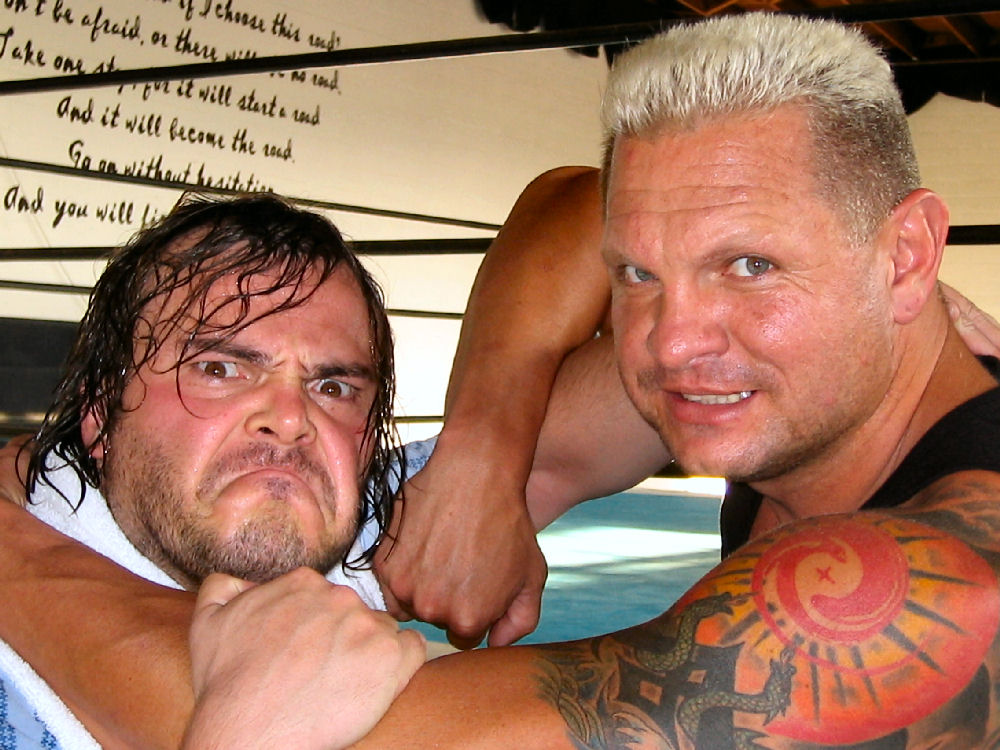
Black and Tom Howard on set of Nacho Libre in 2006

He starred in one of his few dramatic roles as the obsessed filmmaker Carl Denham in Peter Jackson's 2005 remake of King Kong, a performance he based on Orson Welles. In 2006, he played the role of King Herod in a one night benefit concert of Tim Rice and Andrew Lloyd Webber's Jesus Christ Superstar at the Ricardo Montalban Theatre. That same year, he starred as the romantic love interest to Kate Winslet in the Nancy Meyers romantic comedy The Holiday (2006). Also in 2006, he starred in the comedy film Nacho Libre, which he also produced, and Tenacious D in The Pick of Destiny, which he also wrote and produced. In 2007, he took a supporting role in the Noah Baumbach directed comedy-drama film Margot at the Wedding starring Nicole Kidman and Jennifer Jason Leigh. That same year, he made a cameo appearance, portraying Paul McCartney, in Walk Hard: The Dewey Cox Story (2007). Black has voice acted on other occasions, including "Husbands and Knives" from The Simpsons, which aired November 18, 2007, portraying Milo, the friendly owner of the rival comic book store. In 2008, he starred in the buddy comedy Be Kind Rewind, opposite Mos Def, and the war satire Tropic Thunder, alongside Ben Stiller and Robert Downey Jr. On December 14, he hosted the 2008 Spike Video Game Awards. Black has hosted the Nickelodeon Kids' Choice Awards and Acceptable.TV.

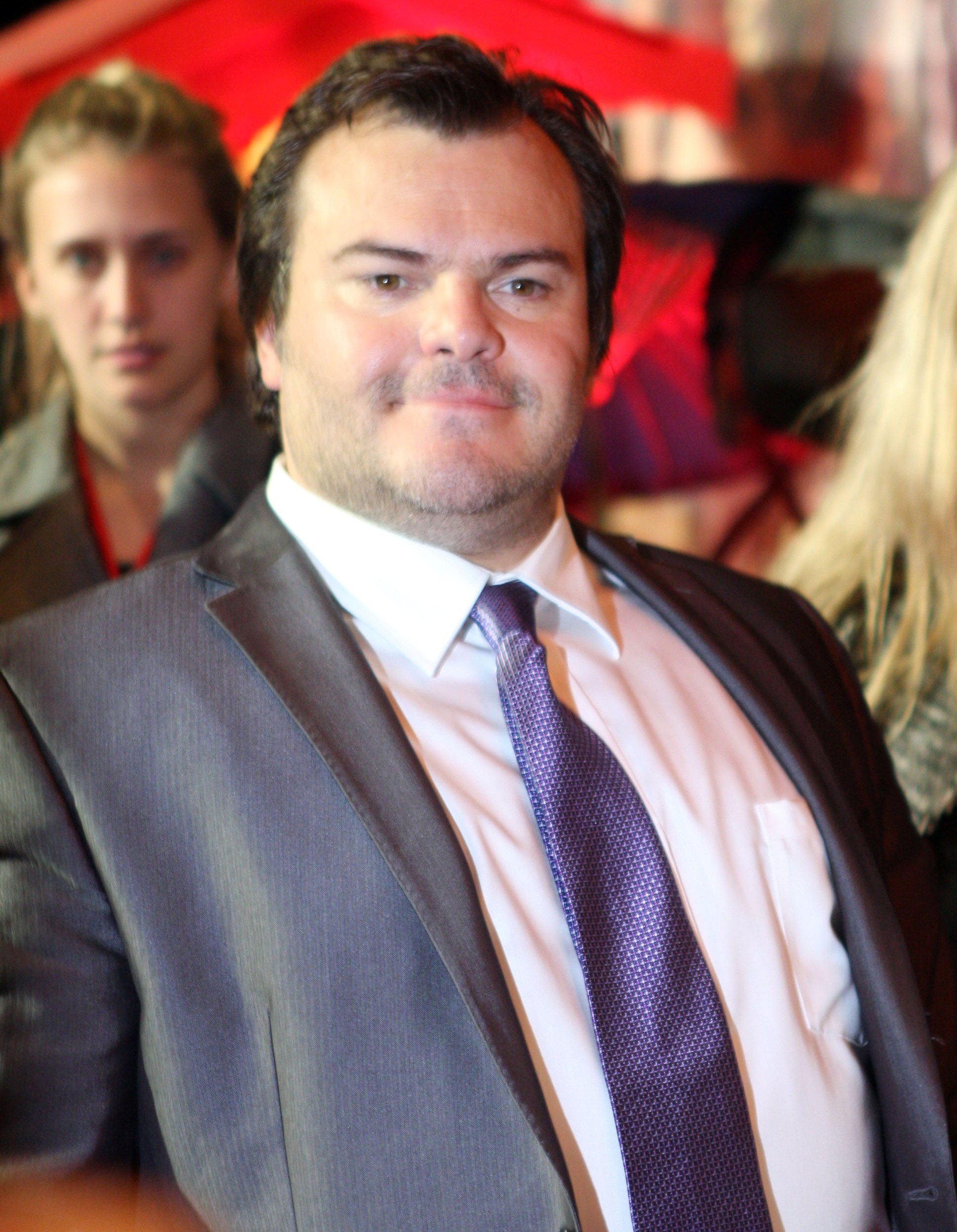
Black at a Kung Fu Panda 2 premiere in June 2011

He voiced the title role in Kung Fu Panda, which grossed US$20.3 million on its opening day, June 6, 2008, as well as Kung Fu Panda 2 Kung Fu Panda 3 and Kung Fu Panda 4; this is his favorite role, calling it “the role of a lifetime” and he praises the tutoring of co-star and two-time Academy Award winner Dustin Hoffman. In addition to Kung Fu Panda (2008), He provided the voice of the main character, roadie Eddie Riggs, in the heavy metal–themed action-adventure video game Brütal Legend, for which he won the Best Voice award at the Spike Video Game Awards in 2009.

In 2009, he appeared in the post-Super Bowl episode of The Office along with Cloris Leachman and Jessica Alba in a fake movie within the show. He starred in the Harold Ramis-directed adventure comedy Year One (2009) alongside Michael Cera. In April 2009, Black starred in an episode of Yo Gabba Gabba!, in which he vocalized children songs, such as "It's Not Fun to Get Lost", "Friends", and "The Goodbye Song". Black voiced Darth Vader in Bad Lip Reading's parodies of the Star Wars original trilogy on YouTube.

=== 2010s ===
In 2010, Black made a guest appearance on Community and also guest-starred on Nickelodeon's iCarly in an episode titled, "iStart a Fan War". Black has appeared numerous times on the "untelevised TV network" short film festival Channel 101, created by Dan Harmon and Rob Schrab, starring in the shows Computerman, Timebelt, and Laserfart. He also provided an introduction for the unaired sketch comedy Awesometown, donning a Colonial-era military uniform. In the introduction, he claims to be George Washington and takes credit for the accomplishments of other American presidents such as Thomas Jefferson and Abraham Lincoln. His next film, The Big Year, a competitive birdwatching comedy co-starring Owen Wilson, Steve Martin, and JoBeth Williams, was released in October 2011. Black garnered a second Golden Globe Award nomination, this time in the category Best Actor in a Comedy, for his 2011 starring role in Richard Linklater's black comedy Bernie. He played as real-life murderer Bernie Tiede, a funeral director in a small East Texas town, who befriends and eventually murders a rich widow, played by Shirley MacLaine. Black's subdued portrayal, authentic East Texas accent, and musical talent – he sings several gospel hymns as well as "Seventy-six Trombones" – had Roger Ebert describing Black's work as "one of the performances of the year." He presented the tribute to Led Zeppelin when the band was named as 2012 recipients of Kennedy Center Honors.

In 2015, Black played a fictional version of real-life author R. L. Stine for Goosebumps, and provided the voices of two of Stine's creations, Slappy the Dummy and The Invisible Boy. He reprised the Stine role in the film's 2018 sequel, Goosebumps 2: Haunted Halloween. He also voiced himself and many other additional characters on the animated YouTube series "Tenacious D in Post-Apocalypto", which he also co-directed and co-wrote, along with his Tenacious D partner Kyle Gass. In 2017, he portrayed a teenage girl inhabiting the body of Professor Sheldon "Shelly" Oberon in the action/adventure comedy film Jumanji: Welcome to the Jungle. He starred alongside Dwayne Johnson, Kevin Hart and Karen Gillan. The film received positive reviews and was a commercial success.

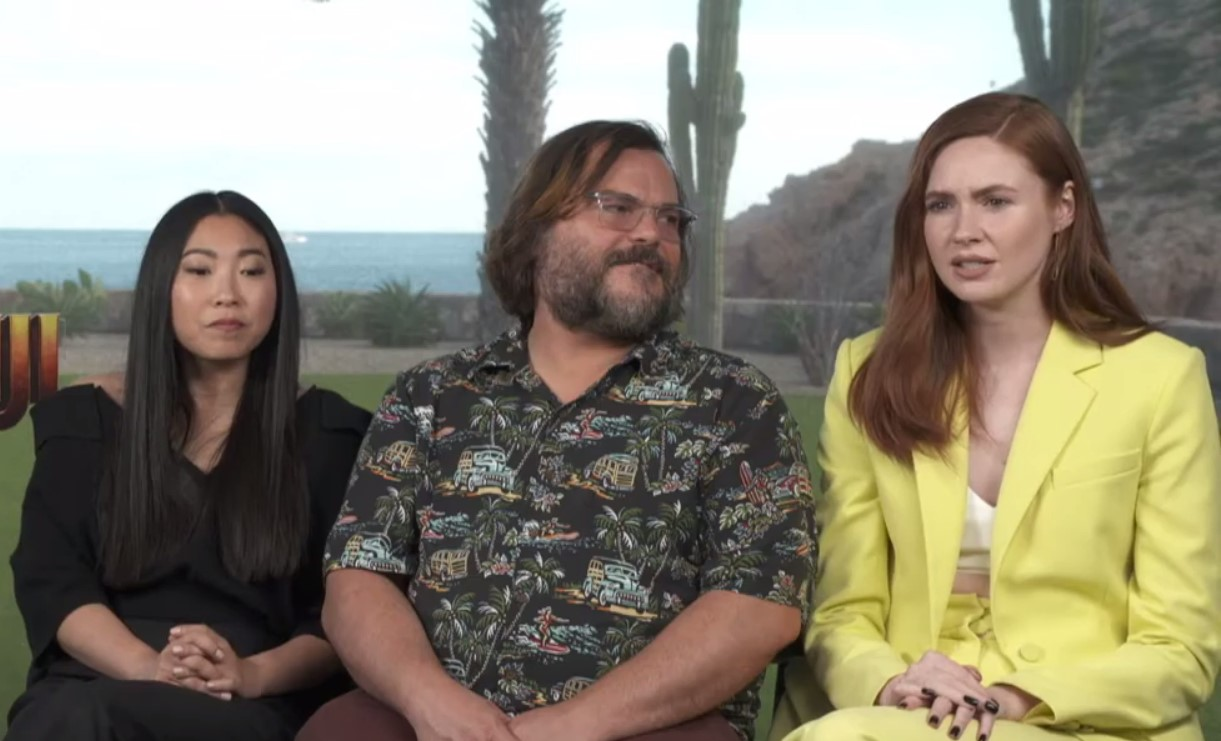
Awkwafina, Black and Karen Gillan in 2019

The following year, he took a supporting dramatic turn in the Gus Van Sant drama Don't Worry, He Won't Get Far on Foot (2018). The film received critical acclaim and starred Joaquin Phoenix, Rooney Mara and Jonah Hill. Also in 2018, Black appeared in the music video for Gorillaz song "Humility". He reprised his role in Jumanji: Welcome to the Jungle's sequel, Jumanji: The Next Level (2019), which, like its predecessor, was also a box-office success, becoming one of the highest-grossing films of 2019. That year, he starred in the children's fantasy film The House with a Clock in Its Walls (2019) alongside Cate Blanchett and Renée Elise Goldsberry.

=== 2020s ===
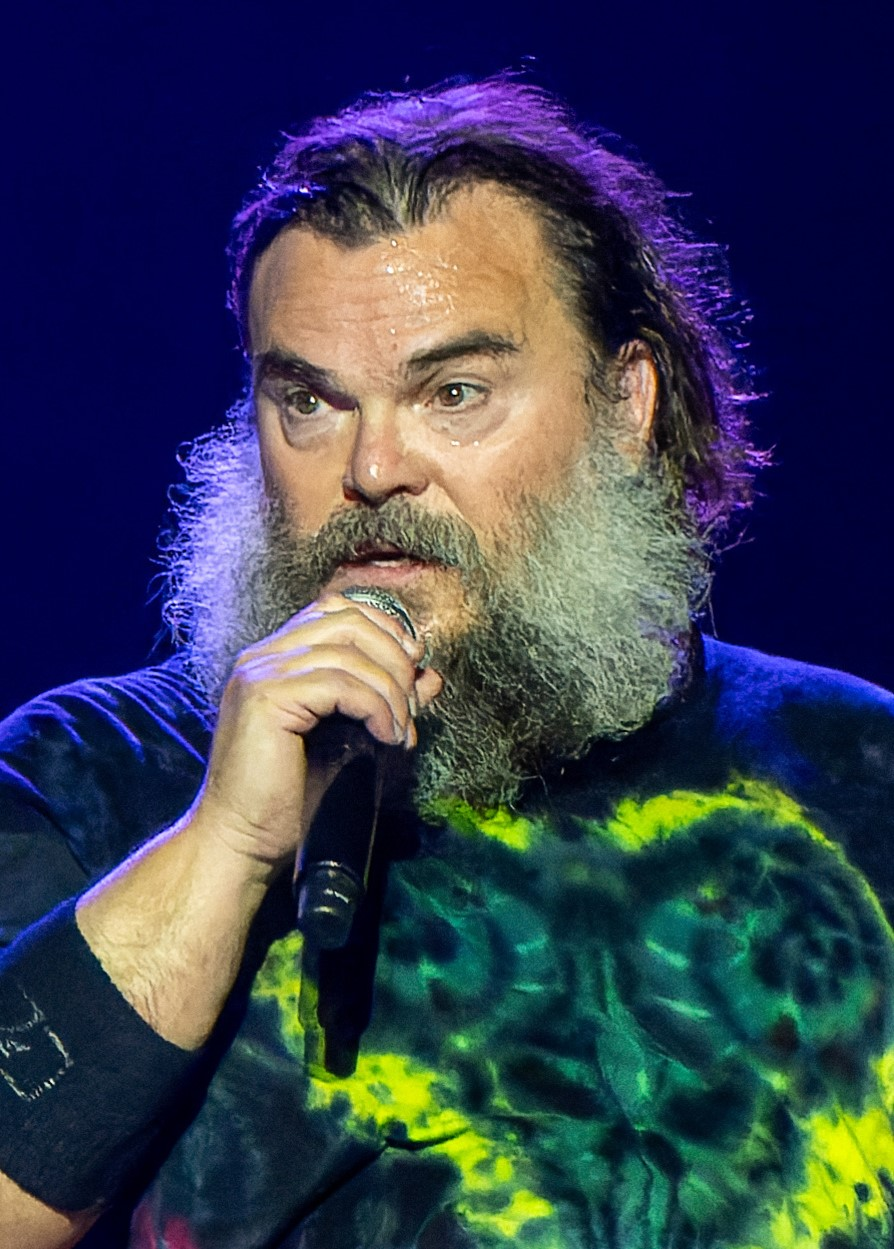
Black in 2023

In 2022, he lent his voice to the Richard Linklater animated coming-of-age film Apollo 10 1/2: A Space Age Childhood. Also that year, he portrayed disc jockey Wolfman Jack in the Roku biographical parody film Weird: The Al Yankovic Story. From 2022 to 2023, he reprised the role of Po in the Netflix animated series Kung Fu Panda: The Dragon Knight. He also guest starred on the Paramount+ series Big Nate and the Adult Swim series Rick and Morty.

In 2023, Black voiced Bowser in Illumination's animated feature film The Super Mario Bros. Movie, based on the Nintendo games. The film was released in April 2023, and reprises the role of the character again in the sequel The Super Mario Galaxy Movie, based on the video games Super Mario Galaxy (2007) and Super Mario Galaxy 2 (2010), released in April 2026 and they became an international box office success ranking as between one of the highest-grossing films of 2023 and one of the highest-grossing films of 2026. That same year, he also took roles as Joseph Stalin in the Mel Brooks Hulu comedy series History of the World, Part II and Captain Bombardier in the Disney+ series The Mandalorian. Black then reprised his role as Po in Kung Fu Panda 4, voiced Claptrap in Borderlands (both 2024), and portrayed Steve in A Minecraft Movie (2025), and will reprise his role as Steve in the sequel, A Minecraft Movie Squared (2027).

== Music career ==
=== Tenacious D ===
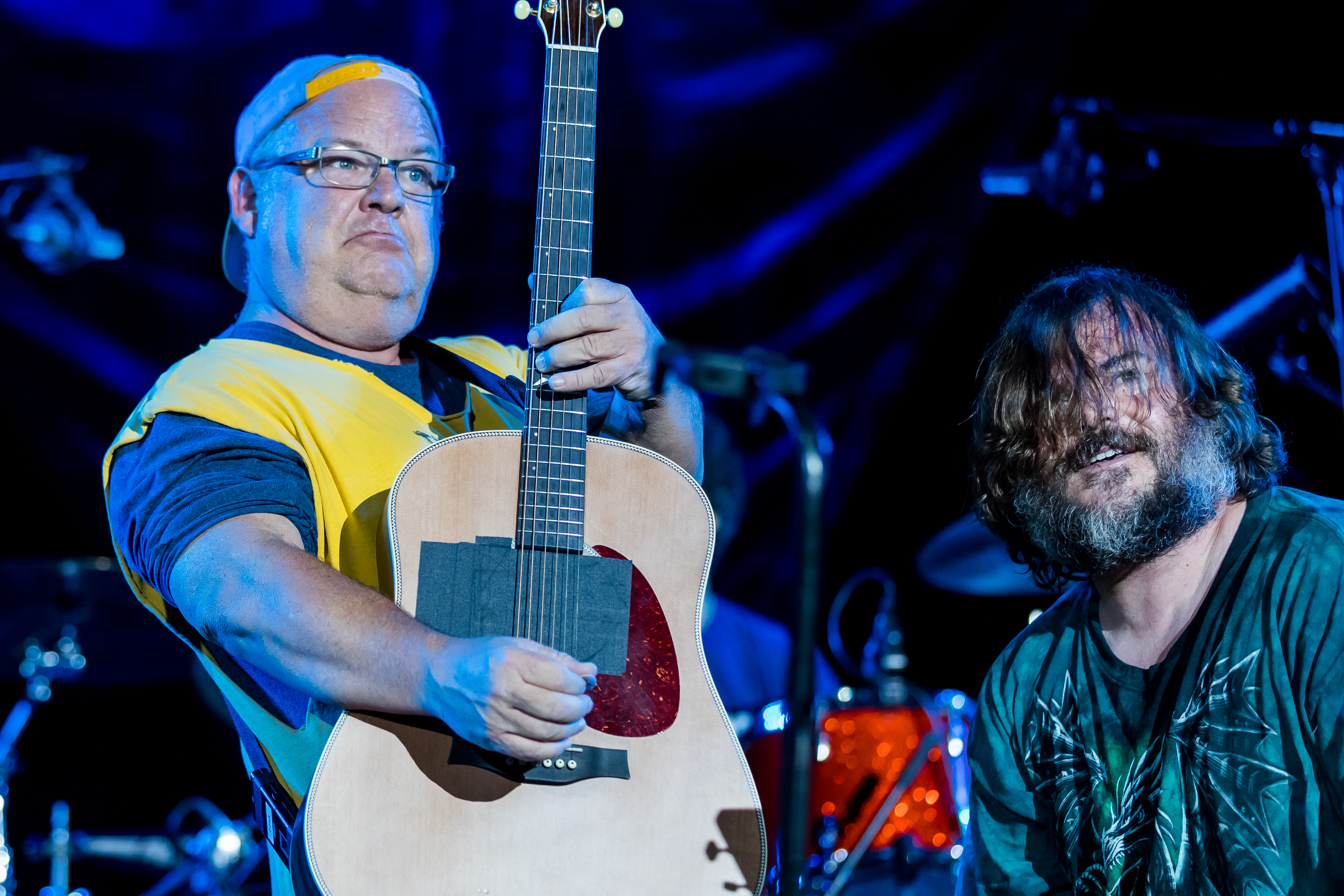
Tenacious D performing in 2016

Black is the lead singer and rhythm guitarist for the comedy rock/hard rock duo Tenacious D along with Kyle Gass. They have released five albums, a self-titled debut, The Pick of Destiny, Rize of the Fenix, and Post-Apocalypto. One of their songs from their album The Pick of Destiny, titled "The Metal", was used in the music video games Guitar Hero III: Legends of Rock and Brütal Legend. "Rock Your Socks", from the album Tenacious D, was played in the music video game Rock Band Unplugged as well. "Master Exploder" from The Pick Of Destiny went on to be used in music video games Guitar Hero Van Halen, Rock Band 2, and Brütal Legend, along with their song "Tribute" from Tenacious D. "Master Exploder" and "The Metal" featured in the comedy film Tenacious D in The Pick of Destiny. The film, directed by Tenacious D veteran Liam Lynch, featured recurring characters from Black's comedy such as Lee the super-fan and the Sasquatch. Several celebrities had roles in the film; actor Tim Robbins cameos as does Dave Grohl as Satan. Ben Stiller also makes an appearance as a worker at a Guitar Center, even having a role in the music video for "Tribute".

In October 2010, Tenacious D appeared at BlizzCon 2010, a convention hosted by the game designers, Blizzard Entertainment. In 2012, Jack Black joined up with other celebrities to record "Book People Unite", a song sponsored by the Library of Congress and RIF.

On July 14, 2024, Tenacious D celebrated Gass' birthday during their performance at the ICC Sydney Theater. A birthday cake was brought out and Black encouraged Gass to make a wish. Gass responded, "Don't miss Trump next time", referring to the attempted assassination of Donald Trump the day before. Two days later, Black wrote on social media that he was "blindsided" by Gass' comment and that he did not condone hate speech or political violence "in any form". Tenacious D canceled the rest of their world tour, and Black said their "creative plans are on hold". Gass apologized on social media, calling his comment "highly inappropriate, dangerous and a terrible mistake". Gass deleted the apology later that week.

=== Solo ===
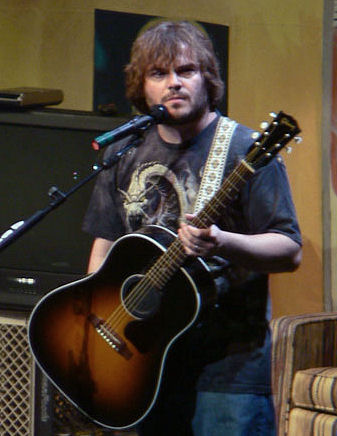
Black performing in 2006

In 2000, Black (along with Gass) provided backing vocals to punk rock band The Vandals' song "Fourteen", which appears on their album Look What I Almost Stepped In.... Black has also appeared on Dave Grohl's Probot album, providing vocals for the hidden song "I Am The Warlock", and Lynch's Fake Songs album, providing vocals for the song "Rock and Roll Whore". Black performed a cover of Marvin Gaye's "Let's Get It On" in the last sequence of High Fidelity. He lent his musical abilities to the Queens of the Stone Age song "Burn the Witch" with rhythmic stomps and claps. He also provided vocals for two tracks on the 2006 album Death by Sexy by Eagles of Death Metal, and on The Lonely Island's track "Sax Man" from the album Incredibad.

Black also recorded a duet on Meat Loaf's album, Hang Cool Teddy Bear, on the song "Like a Rose". Meat Loaf also played Black's father in the Pick of Destiny movie. Black has appeared in music videos of Beck's "Sexx Laws"; Foo Fighters' "Learn to Fly", "Low", and "The One"; The Eagles of Death Metal's "I Want You So Hard (Boy's Bad News)"; Sum 41's "Things I Want"; Dio's "Push"; Weezer's "Photograph"; The Mooney Suzuki's "In a Young Man's Mind"; "Weird Al" Yankovic's "Tacky", and Die Antwoord's "Ugly Boy".

Black did guest vocals and appeared on the Dethklok soundtrack album The Doomstar Requiem. He sings the parts for Dethklok's original band manager as well as a blogger. Black, as a member of Tenacious D, won the award for Best Metal Performance at the 57th Grammy Awards. The song "The Last in Line" won the award, a cover of the song of the same name by Dio that appeared on the tribute album This Is Your Life.

In 2025, "Steve's Lava Chicken", Black's song in A Minecraft Movie, became the shortest song in history to land on the Billboard Hot 100 chart. The song is 34 seconds long. The previous record holder was "Beautiful Trip" by Kid Cudi, which is 37 seconds long.

On October 3, 2026, Black performed at the Power to the People Festival along with Roman Morello, Revel Ian, Yoyoka Soma & Hugo Weiss at Merriweather Post Pavilion in Columbia, MD. The festival, which was put on by Tom Morello, also featured performances by Morello, Bruce Springsteen, Foo Fighters and many others, was held in response toward President Donald Trump.

== Other ventures ==
=== Activism ===
Black encouraging people to wear face masks as part of California's "Your Actions Save Lives" campaign during the COVID-19 pandemic in 2020

Tenacious D helped the United Mitochondrial Disease Foundation raise awareness of these diseases and funds for the organization in Los Angeles on December 20, 2001, and in San Diego, California on June 16, 2007. Tenacious D can be seen performing in the 90s-era Pauly Shore film Bio-Dome where the duo is performing its song "The Five Needs" at a "Save the Environment" party. In 2016, Black joined the climate change documentary show Years of Living Dangerously as one of its celebrity correspondents.

Black endorsed Barack Obama's 2012 re-election campaign. In 2015, he visited Kampala as part of Comic Relief USA's Red Nose Day. Black is an outspoken critic of Donald Trump. On the day of Trump's 2017 presidential inauguration, he and Tenacious D bandmate Kyle Gass performed their 2006 protest song "The Government Totally Sucks". Black said to the audience beforehand, "We haven't played it for years, because it just never felt appropriate—but now, we're happy to unleash the beast. The government totally sucks."

Before the 2022 election, Black hosted a letter and text writing party to rally VoteRiders volunteers engaged in educating eligible voters about voter ID requirements in their states. Of the 2022 midterms, he said, "[S]o much is on the ballot this cycle. We've got a woman's right to choose. The environment is on the ballot, environmental protections. And not to mention democracy is on the ballot. There's so, there's so many divides in this country right now." Black said he viewed a potential reelection bid by Trump as a threat that is "always lurking in the background."

Black was a signatory of "No Hostage Left Behind," a 2023 open letter espousing support for Israel in the Gaza War and asking US President Joe Biden to ensure the release of hostages kidnapped during the October 7 attacks.

=== Production company ===
In August 2006, Black registered his own production company, Electric Dynamite Productions, Inc. The company's first work produced was the 2009 mockumentary Branson, which was a co-production with BranMo Productions and Perfect Weekend. In 2011, the company would produce two TV-movies, My Life As an Experiment and Shredd. In 2013, the company notably produced TV series Ghost Ghirls for the now-defunct Yahoo! Screen, as well as obtained the rights to adapt the UK mockumentary Wizard's Way into a feature film. The company would also be a producer credit on The D Train (2015) and The Polka King (2017), both of which featured Black in the starring role. The company produced The Aquabats! RadVentures! in 2018, the dark-comedy film Happily in 2021.

=== YouTube channel ===
On December 21, 2018, Black created a YouTube channel called Jablinski Games. Within one week of its launch, it had amassed over 1 million subscribers. The videos published on the channel are typically either candid vlogs involving Black and his two sons, or gaming content. Black created the channel largely to bond with his son, who serves as videographer and editor of the channel. On July 21, 2019, Black took part in a Minecraft stream with popular YouTuber PewDiePie to raise money for the National Alliance on Mental Illness (NAMI), in the wake of the suicide of Etika in June 2019. After two days of streaming, they raised $30,479 with the stream being broadcast live both on YouTube and on the streaming platform DLive. As of June 2025, Jablinski Games has 5.14 million subscribers and 239 million video views. The channel, for a period, didn't upload after May 11, 2023 (the upload being the music video for Tenacious D's "Video Games". The channel, after 3 years, uploaded a video on May 14, 2026, titled "WE'RE BACK BABY!!!!", which was later retitled to "Racing Kevin Hart for PINK SLIPS!!!!".

== Personal life ==
At age 14, Black struggled with cocaine use. He said, "I was having a lot of troubles with cocaine ... I was hanging out with some pretty rough characters. I was scared to go to school because one of them wanted to kill me. I wanted to get out of there." One of Black's brothers, Howard Siegel, died of AIDS in 1989 at age 31. His oldest brother, Neil Siegel, is an engineer, scientist, and musician.

Black dated actress Laura Kightlinger between 1996 and 2005. (Note: Attributed to multiple sources.) In January 2006, Black became engaged to singer Tanya Haden, a daughter of jazz bassist Charlie Haden. They had both attended Crossroads School, and 15 years after graduating they met again at a friend's birthday party. They married on March 14, 2006, in Big Sur, California. Their sons were born in 2006 and 2008.

Although an atheist, Black identifies as nominally Jewish, and fatherhood influenced his decision to raise his children in the Jewish faith.

== Discography ==
=== With Tenacious D ===
- Tenacious D (2001)
- The Pick of Destiny (2006)
- Rize of the Fenix (2012)
- Post-Apocalypto (2018)

=== Soundtrack albums ===
List of soundtrack albums, with select details and certifications
Title	Album details	Certifications
School of Rock	Released September 30, 2003; Label: Atlantic	BPI: Gold
The Polka King	Released: January 12, 2018; Label: Lakeshore; Format: Digital download, streaming	

=== Charted songs ===
List of charted songs, with year released, selected chart positions, certifications and album name shown
Title	Year	Peak chart positions							Certifications	Album
Title	Year	US	AUS	CAN	IRE	NZ Hot	UK	WW	Certifications	Album
"Kung Fu Fighting" (with CeeLo Green)	2008	—	77	—	—	—	—	—		Kung Fu Panda soundtrack
"Peaches"	2023	56	91	52	75	13	28	48	RIAA: Platinum	The Super Mario Bros. Movie
"Steve's Lava Chicken"	2025	78	71	64	23	11	9	97	RIAA: Gold; BPI: Silver	A Minecraft Movie
"—" denotes a recording that did not chart.

== Awards and nominations ==
On September 18, 2018, Black was inducted into Hollywood's Walk of Fame.

Award ceremony	Year	Category	Work	Result	Ref.
Annie Awards	2024	Outstanding Achievement for Voice Acting in a Feature Production	The Super Mario Bros. Movie	Nominated	
Astra Film Awards	2024	Best Voice-Over Performance	The Super Mario Bros. Movie	Nominated	
Astra Film Awards	2024	Best Original Song	"Peaches"	Nominated	
Children's and Family Emmy Awards	2023	Outstanding Voice Performance in a Children's or Young Teen Program	Kung Fu Panda: The Dragon Knight	Won	
Critics' Choice Movie Awards	2013	Best Actor in a Comedy	Bernie	Nominated	
Critics' Choice Movie Awards	2024	Best Song	"Peaches"	Nominated	
Golden Globe Awards	2004	Best Performance by an Actor in a Motion Picture – Musical or Comedy	School of Rock	Nominated	
Golden Globe Awards	2013	Best Performance by an Actor in a Motion Picture – Musical or Comedy	Bernie	Nominated	
Golden Globe Awards	2024	Best Original Song	"Peaches"	Nominated	
Golden Raspberry Awards	2011	Worst Actor	Gulliver's Travels	Nominated	
Golden Raspberry Awards	2025	Worst Actor	Dear Santa	Nominated	
Golden Raspberry Awards	2025	Worst Supporting Actor (Note: Voice only)	Borderlands	Nominated	
Golden Raspberry Awards	2025	Worst Screen Combo (Note: Nominated as "Any two obnoxious characters (But especially Jack Black)")	Borderlands	Nominated	
Independent Spirit Awards	2013	Best Male Lead	Bernie	Nominated	
MTV Movie & TV Awards	2001	Best Breakthrough Male Performance	High Fidelity	Nominated	
MTV Movie & TV Awards	2001	Best Musical Moment	"Let's Get It On"	Nominated	
MTV Movie & TV Awards	2004	Best Comedic Performance	School of Rock	Won	
MTV Movie & TV Awards	2004	MTV Movie Award for Best On-Screen Time	School of Rock	Nominated (Note: Shared with the School of Rock Band)	
MTV Movie & TV Awards	2007	Best Fight	Nacho Libre	Nominated (Note: Shared with Héctor Jiménez)	
MTV Movie & TV Awards	2018	Best Comedic Performance	Jumanji: Welcome to the Jungle	Nominated	
MTV Movie & TV Awards	2018	Best On-Screen Team	Jumanji: Welcome to the Jungle	Nominated (Note: Shared with Dwayne Johnson, Kevin Hart, Karen Gillan and Nick Jonas)	
Nickelodeon Kids' Choice Awards	2007	Favorite Movie Actor	Nacho Libre	Nominated	
Nickelodeon Kids' Choice Awards	2009	Favorite Voice From an Animated Movie	Kung Fu Panda	Won	
Nickelodeon Kids' Choice Awards	2011	Favorite Movie Actor	Gulliver's Travels	Nominated	
Nickelodeon Kids' Choice Awards	2012	Favorite Voice From an Animated Movie	Kung Fu Panda 2	Nominated	
Nickelodeon Kids' Choice Awards	2017	Most Wanted Pet	Kung Fu Panda 3	Nominated	
Nickelodeon Kids' Choice Awards	2024	Favorite Voice From an Animated Movie	Kung Fu Panda 4	Nominated	
Nickelodeon Kids' Choice Awards	2024	Favorite Voice From an Animated Movie	The Super Mario Bros. Movie	Nominated	
Nickelodeon Kids' Choice Awards	2024	Favorite Villain	The Super Mario Bros. Movie	Won	
Nickelodeon Kids' Choice Awards	2025	Favorite Movie Actor	A Minecraft Movie	Won	
Nickelodeon Kids' Choice Awards	2025	Favorite Butt-Kicker	A Minecraft Movie	Nominated	
Nickelodeon Kids' Choice Awards	2025	Favorite Song from a Movie	"I Feel Alive"	Nominated	
Nickelodeon Kids' Choice Awards	2025	King of Comedy	Himself	Won	
Nickelodeon Kids' Choice Awards	2026	Favorite Male Animated Voice from a Movie	The Super Mario Galaxy Movie	Nominated	
Nickelodeon Kids' Choice Awards	2026	Favorite Villain	The Super Mario Galaxy Movie	Nominated	
Satellite Awards	2004	Best Actor in a Motion Picture – Comedy or Musical	School of Rock	Nominated	
Satellite Awards	2024	Best Original Song	"Peaches"	Nominated	

== See also ==
- List of atheists in film, radio, television and theater
