= The Polka King =

2017 American biographical comedy-drama film

- Film poster
- Directed by: Maya Forbes
- Screenplay by: Maya Forbes; Wallace Wolodarsky
- Based on: The Man Who Would Be Polka King by Joshua Brown and John Mikulak
- Produced by: Jack Black; Stuart Cornfeld; Monica Levinson; Priyanka Mattoo; David Permut; Shivani Rawat; Wallace Wolodarsky
- Starring: Jack Black; Jenny Slate; Jason Schwartzman; J. B. Smoove; Vanessa Bayer; Jacki Weaver
- Cinematography: Andrei Bowden-Schwartz
- Edited by: Catherine Haight
- Music by: Theodore Shapiro; Alex Meixner
- Production companies: ShivHans Pictures; Red Hour Productions; Permut Presentations; Electric Dynamite
- Distributed by: Netflix
- Release dates: January 22, 2017 (Sundance); January 12, 2018 (Worldwide)
- Running time: 95 minutes
- Country: United States
- Language: English

The Polka King is a 2017 American biographical comedy-drama film directed by Maya Forbes and written by Forbes and Wallace Wolodarsky. The film is about real-life Polish-American polka band leader Jan Lewan, who was imprisoned in 2004 for running a Ponzi scheme. The film stars Jack Black as Lewan, as well as Jenny Slate, Jason Schwartzman, and Jacki Weaver. It premiered at the 2017 Sundance Film Festival on January 22, 2017. It was released on Netflix on January 12, 2018.

The Polka King is based on a 2009 documentary about Lewan, The Man Who Would Be Polka King, directed by John Mikulak and Joshua von Brown.

== Plot ==
The film opens at a performance of Jan Lewan's polka band in Pennsylvania. Near the close of the show, he brings his wife, Marla, onstage to model amber jewelry, which they sell at their souvenir store. After the concert, Jan recounts to a happy concertgoer how he emigrated from Poland, ending up in America, working every menial job available until he had saved enough to begin the band. Lewan also recalls performing for a charity telethon, where he met Marla, who was a local beauty queen.

The clarinetist in his band, Mickey, visits Jan at his gift shop to tell him he wants to quit the band. Mickey and his bandmates suspect that Jan has gotten in over his head, and cites rumors, such as a woman in a costume being a "dancing bear act." Jan admits to all this, trying to convince Mickey to, "see the big picture."

An elderly couple visits Jan and asks about investing in his band. He explains that they are guaranteed a 12% annual return on their investment. The band's misfortune starts to reverse, and Mickey thanks Jan for not having to return to Radio Shack, a job he detested. The state Securities and Exchange Commission office discovers Jan is taking on investors, and sends investigator, Ron Edwards, to meet with him. He informs Jan that because he has not registered properly, it is illegal for him to accept investments. He gives Jan three days to return his investors' money and close down.

With hundreds of thousands of dollars already invested, Jan can't meet the SEC deadline. When Edwards sees no further activity, he closes the case. However, Jan has covertly continued his investments by changing the name of his investment firm, as evidenced when the elderly couple looks to increase their investment, and Jan takes their money by drafting up fresh papers.

Jan continues to expand his enterprises, eventually starting a travel company, offering European tours. He sells a package that climaxes with a private audience with the Pope. In Rome, he begs Mickey to help him bribe Vatican officials to secure the Papal audience. Realizing he lied to all the tour-goers, Mickey threatens to expose Jan, but Jan explains that his philosophy is to simply say his goals out loud until they become true. He encourages Mickey to do the same, and Mickey explains that he has dreamt of creating a stage name for himself. Jan kneels with him in the hotel lobby and dubs him, "Mickey Pizzazz".

Marla, feeling the need to achieve something on her own, competes in another beauty pageant. Seeing this as a chance for increased publicity, Jan bribes the judges to crown her Ms. Pennsylvania. When the pageant is accused of foul play, Marla refuses to cede her title. The mounting bad press causes many investors to complain to the SEC, or close their accounts, among them, the elderly couple, Jan's chief investors. Jan dissuades them from leaving by offering them his top rate of a 20% annual return.

While touring, a bus crash kills two people, and hospitalizes Jan's son, and Jan begs God to spare him. When Jan is arrested in tandem with his son's recovery, he happily cooperates with Edwards, thinking this is God's requirement for penance.

Jan is sentenced to five years in prison, and Marla divorces him. He makes friends with some prisoners, who teach him about hip-hop music, and in turn, gain an appreciation for polka. When Jan is released from prison, he is met by his son and Mickey, both of whom propose reviving the polka band.

== Cast ==
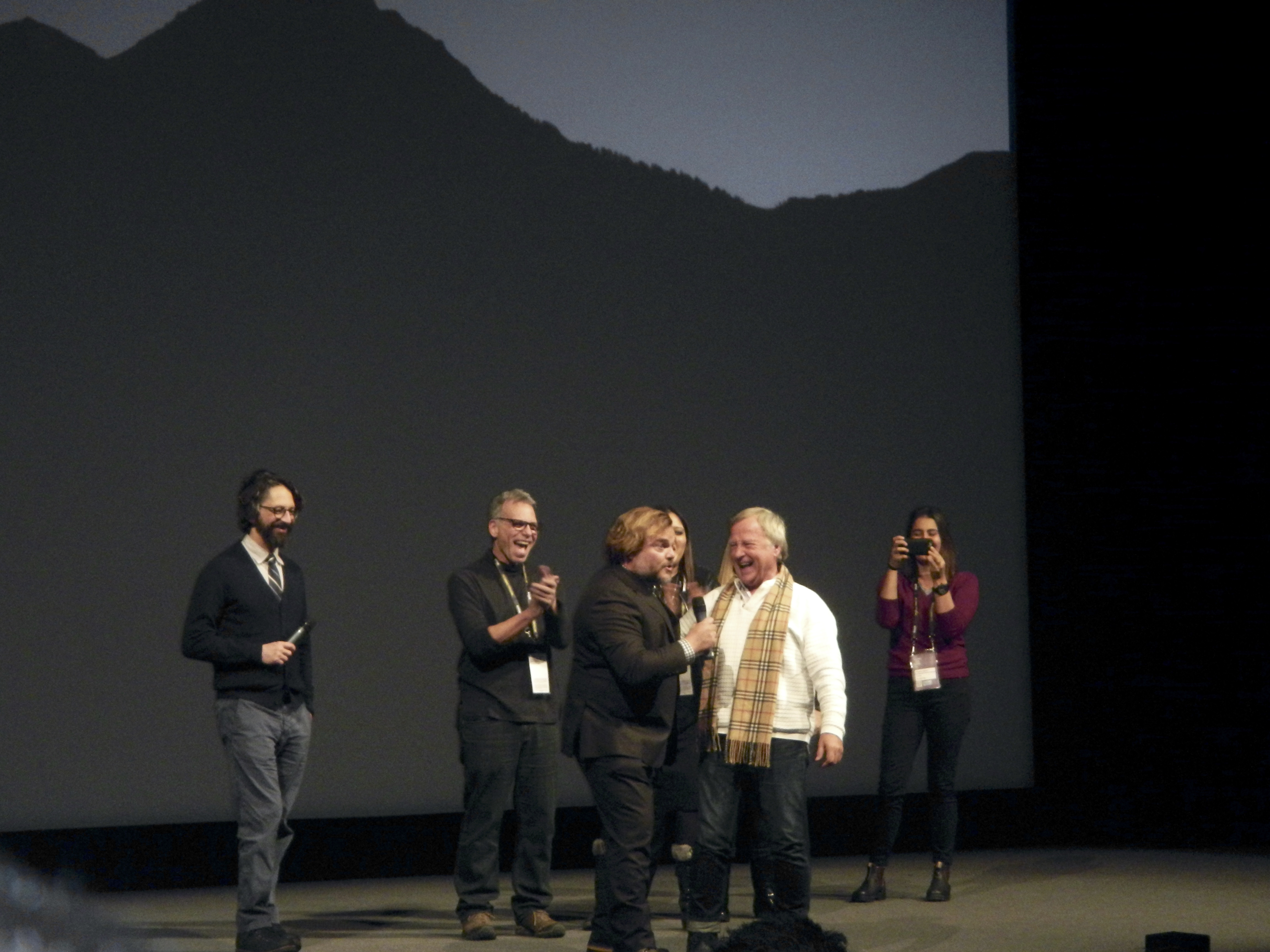
Jack Black alongside Jan Lewan at the 2017 Sundance Film Festival

- Jack Black as Jan Lewan, Marla's husband and David's father
- Jenny Slate as Marla Lewan, Jan's wife and David's mother
- Jason Schwartzman as Mickey Pizzazz, Jan's best friend
- J. B. Smoove as Ron Edwards, an SEC officer
- Vanessa Bayer as Bitsy Bear
- Jacki Weaver as Barb, Jan's mother-in-law
- Robert Capron as David Lewan, Jan and Marla's son
- Willie Garson as Lonny

== Production ==
Principal photography on the film began in mid-July 2016 in Pawtucket, Rhode Island, and later it also took place in Woonsocket and Cranston. The movie has been released on Netflix streaming.

== Reception ==
On review aggregator Rotten Tomatoes, the film holds an approval rating of 67% based on 36 reviews, with an average rating of 6.0/10. The website's critics consensus reads: "Despite moments of hilarity and a talented ensemble, discordant direction and a sloppy script keep The Polka King from truly singing." On Metacritic, the film has a weighted average score of 65 out of 100, based on 11 critics, indicating "generally favorable reviews".
