= Gulliver's Travels (2010 film) =

2010 American film by Rob Letterman

- Theatrical release poster
- Directed by: Rob Letterman
- Screenplay by: Joe Stillman; Nicholas Stoller
- Based on: Gulliver's Travels; 1726 novel by Jonathan Swift
- Produced by: John Davis; Gregory Goodman
- Starring: Jack Black; Jason Segel; Emily Blunt; Amanda Peet; Billy Connolly; Chris O'Dowd; James Corden
- Cinematography: David Tattersall
- Edited by: Dean Zimmerman; Alan Edward Bell
- Music by: Henry Jackman
- Production companies: Dune Entertainment; Davis Entertainment; Ingenious Film Partners; Big Screen Productions; Phoenix Film Partners
- Distributed by: 20th Century Fox
- Release dates: December 22, 2010 (Spain); December 25, 2010 (United States)
- Running time: 85 minutes
- Country: United States
- Language: English
- Budget: $112 million
- Box office: $237.4 million

Gulliver's Travels is a 2010 American fantasy adventure comedy film directed by Rob Letterman in his live-action directorial debut, and written by Joe Stillman and Nicholas Stoller. It is loosely based on Part One (and slightly on Part Two) of the 1726 novel of the same name by Jonathan Swift, though the film takes place in the modern day and contains references to modern pop culture. It stars Jack Black in the title role, alongside Jason Segel, Emily Blunt, Amanda Peet, Billy Connolly, Chris O'Dowd, T.J. Miller, James Corden, Catherine Tate, and Olly Alexander.

The film debuted in Spain on December 22, 2010, and was theatrically released in the United States on December 25, by 20th Century Fox. It received negative reviews, and grossed $237.4 million worldwide on a budget of $112 million.

== Plot ==
Depressed by his dead-end job in the mail room of a New York City newspaper, Lemuel Gulliver decides to impress his crush, journalist Darcy Silverman, by convincing her he can write a report about his extensive world "travels". After suffering writer's block and thinking that Darcy will not want to hang out with a "guy from the mail room", Gulliver plagiarizes a report. The next day, Darcy, impressed by his writing, presents Gulliver with a new task – to travel to the Bermuda Triangle and write an article about the legends of ships mysteriously disappearing there.

Upon arriving in Bermuda, Gulliver rents a ship and travels into the triangle. After falling asleep at the helm, he is caught in a storm, and the ship is overwhelmed by a waterspout. Gulliver washes up unconscious on Lilliput, an island populated by tiny people with a society that is visually and culturally similar to that of Victorian era Europe. After arriving, he is soon seen as a "beast" by the town's population. Having been claimed by the town’s citizens to be dangerous because of his size, Gulliver is imprisoned in a large cave. There, he meets another prisoner named Horatio, who was jailed by General Edward Edwardian, because he loves Princess Mary, whom Edward is pursuing. After the island across from Lilliput, Blefuscia, orders some commandos to kidnap Mary, Gulliver breaks free and saves her. He also saves her father, King Theodore, from a fire by urinating on it.

Gulliver is declared a hero by Lilliput's citizens and lies that he is the President of Manhattan. Edward is outraged by the luxurious accommodations that have been built for Gulliver and by being presented as an honorary general of the Lilliputian Army. The next day, the Blefuscian Navy lays siege to the city when Edward shuts down its defense system as revenge for Gulliver's treatment. Gulliver defeats the armada, invulnerable to the cannonballs being fired at him. Embarrassed, and with Mary no longer wanting anything to do with him, Edward defects to the Blefuscians and brings blueprints of a robot from Gulliver's Guitar Hero III: Legends of Rock game manual for revenge. The Blefuscians secretly build the robot, with Edward as the pilot.

The Blefuscians then invade Lilliput, and the robot-wielding Edward makes Gulliver admit to the people that he is "just the guy from the mail room". Edward banishes Gulliver to the shores of "the island where we dare not go" (Brobdingnag), where he is captured by a "little" girl (Glumdalclitch) who towers over him while Edward begins renaming Lilliput "New Blefuscia". Gulliver wakes in a pink dress in the girl's dollhouse, and she treats him as a doll, playing with him roughly. Horatio, who has gone to find Gulliver after being spurned by Mary, reveals to Gulliver that Darcy was imprisoned by the Blefuscians after she was lost in the Bermuda Triangle in the same manner as Gulliver. Gulliver escapes with him, using a parachute that he took from the skeleton of a dead U.S. Air Force pilot sitting in the dollhouse.

Accepting a duel from Edward, Gulliver defeats him with the assistance of Horatio, who disables the machine's electrocuting weapon. Horatio is hailed a hero and gets King Theodore's permission to court Mary. When Edward recovers from the battle and desperately threatens to kill Mary, she punches him in the face. King Theodore sentences all Blefuscians to the gallows or to prepare for war, but Gulliver helps to make peace between the two nations by reciting Edwin Starr's "War", and he and Darcy return to New York on their repaired ship. Gulliver, now a legitimate travel writer, takes Darcy to lunch after returning from another travel assignment.

== Cast ==
- Jack Black as Lemuel Gulliver, a mail-room worker who becomes a journalist after plagiarizing a report and winds up in Lilliput after encountering a storm
- Jason Segel as Horatio, Lilliput's tallest man who Gulliver befriends
- Emily Blunt as Princess Mary, the princess of Lilliput and Prince August's sister
- Amanda Peet as Darcy Silverman, a journalist and Gulliver's girlfriend
- Billy Connolly as King Theodore, the king of Lilliput and Mary's father
- Chris O'Dowd as General Edward Edwardian, the commander of the Lilliput Army, who dislikes Gulliver
- T.J. Miller as Dan Quint
- James Corden as Jinks
- Catherine Tate as Queen Isabelle, the queen of Lilliput and Mary's mother
- Olly Alexander as Prince August, the prince of Lilliput and Mary's brother

== Production ==
Cote Zellers created and directed a series of segments for Nickelodeon's animated sketch comedy anthology series KaBlam! called Prometheus and Bob, and a film based on the segment was considered and announced in 1998, with Joe Stillman as a screenwriter. While that film was ultimately cancelled, Zellers would say in 2019 that "a lot of those ideas from that Prometheus And Bob script showed up in that really horrible Jack Black Gulliver's Travels movie".

In a January 2010 interview on The Late Late Show with Craig Ferguson, Jason Segel explained his character spends most of the film in Black's shirt pocket. The film features 7.1 surround sound in select AMC, Regal, and Cinemark theaters. The name of Liliput's rival country, Blefuscu, was also changed to Blefuscia. Filming of the Lilliput royal palace was at Blenheim Palace. Miniature 1:12 scale dolls' house furniture and accessories from Derbyshire firm The Dolls House Emporium were used to bring the movie alive with less need for special effects. Jonathan Swift, the original author of the novel on which the film was loosely based, is not mentioned during the credits, despite the titles mentioning that the film is not an original piece.

According to co-star Emily Blunt, Blunt was originally cast as Black Widow in Iron Man 2, but had to drop out due to her commitment to do this film. During her interview on The Howard Stern Show on May 11, 2021, Blunt revealed to Howard Stern that she was forced by contractual obligation to appear, because of a two-picture deal with 20th Century Fox when she starred in The Devil Wears Prada.

== Soundtrack ==
A soundtrack album of Henry Jackman's original score was released by Varese Sarabande. Rock music and film themes that appear in the film include:

- "Rock and Roll All Nite" – Performed by Kiss
- "Listen To Mama" – Performed by Walkerman
- "Rose's Theme" – Written by James Horner
- "The Imperial March" – Written by John Williams
- "Sweet Child o' Mine" – Performed by Guns N' Roses
- "Kiss" – Performed by Taylor Graves
- "War" – Written by Norman Whitfield and Barrett Strong
- "(I Keep On) Rising Up" – Written and Performed by Mike Doughty

== Release ==
=== Marketing ===
The official trailer for the film was released on June 3, 2010; and attached to Marmaduke a day after. The second trailer was released on November 5, 2010, and it is also attached to Megamind. As a prize on the television show Survivor: Nicaragua, four of its contestants were able to watch the film before its release.

Originally scheduled for release on June 4, 2010, it was pushed back to December 24, 2010, and later changed again to December 22, 2010. 20th Century Fox later announced on March 23, 2010, that the film would be converted to 3D. On December 13, 20th Century Fox announced that it would again move the release date, this time to December 25, 2010.

The film was accompanied by an Ice Age short film titled Scrat's Continental Crack-Up.

=== Home media ===
Gulliver's Travels was released on DVD, Blu-ray Disc, and Blu-ray 3D on April 19, 2011, by 20th Century Fox Home Entertainment.

== Reception ==
=== Box office ===
Gulliver's Travels grossed $42.8 million in the United States and Canada, and $194.6 million in other territories, for a worldwide total of $237.4 million. Produced on a budget of $112 million, the film was a box-office failure in North America, though it fared significantly better internationally.

In the United States and Canada, Gulliver's Travels opened on December 25, 2010. It grossed $3.4 million on its first day, in 2,546 theaters, with an average of $1,346 per theater, ranking at fifth place behind The Chronicles of Narnia: The Voyage of the Dawn Treader. It finished the weekend with $6.3 million, having grossed an additional $2.8 million on Sunday, with an average of $1,130 per theater, and finished at seventh place behind The Fighter, for a decline of -16%. Between Monday and Tuesday, it grossed $5.6 million, and grossed an additional $6.2 million between Wednesday and Thursday, in 2,993 theaters. In its second weekend, it grossed $9.3 million in 3,089 theaters during the 2011 New Year's, with a combined average of $3,009 per theater; it ranked at eighth behind Tangled. The film ended its domestic box office run on April 7, 2011, with a total of $42,779,261.

In Europe, the Middle East, and Africa, Gulliver's Travels' highest-earning markets included: the United Kingdom ($24.7 million), Spain ($11.5 million), Germany ($10.1 million), France ($6.5 million), Italy ($5 million), Poland ($2.3 million), Austria ($2.1 million), the Netherlands ($1.6 million), Switzerland ($1.3 million), the United Arab Emirates ($1.2 million), Sweden ($1.2 million), and Belgium ($1 million). In Latin America, its highest-earning markets included: Mexico ($11.6 million), Brazil ($8 million), Colomboa ($2.4 million), Argentina ($2.3 million), Peru ($1.9 million), and Venezuela ($1.7 million). In the Asia Pacific, its highest-earning markets included: Japan ($18.9 million), Russia ($17.1 million), Australia ($16.2 million), South Korea ($14.5 million), Hong Kong ($4 million), Malaysia ($3.6 million), Singapore ($2.4 million), Philippines ($1.9 million), and New Zealand ($1.6 million).

=== Critical response ===
On the review aggregator website Rotten Tomatoes, 19% of 119 critics' reviews are positive, with an average rating of 4.10/10. The website's consensus reads: "Though Jack Black is back doing what he does best, Gulliver's Travels largely fails to do any justice to its source material, relying instead on juvenile humor and special effects."" Metacritic, which uses a weighted average, assigned the film a score of 33 out of 100, based on 32 critics, indicating "generally unfavorable" reviews. Audiences polled by CinemaScore gave the film an average grade of "B−" on an A+ to F scale.

Kirk Honeycutt of The Hollywood Reporter commented that "any sense of fun slowly drains away as the movie insists on highlighting effects over character and story," while Time Out gave it 2 out of 5 stars, commenting that the film "veers between the very mildly chucklesome and plain not funny." The Wall Street Journal called it "a movie of such stupendous uninspiration" that it was "monumentally dreadful," and the San Francisco Chronicle called it "cute" but "sleep-inducing." Slant Magazine rated the film 1.5 out of 4 stars, and Empire rated 2 out of 5 stars, calling it "a low-grade comedy that'll have Jonathan Swift turning in his grave."

Conversely, Roger Ebert commented that knowing who the film is for, and who it is not for, might help viewers appreciate it. He awarded the film three out of four stars.

Emily Blunt has openly slighted the film, especially since she was forced to turn down the role of Natasha Romanoff in Iron Man 2 for it. While promoting The Fall Guy, Ryan Gosling brought up Gulliver's Travels, causing Blunt to respond, "We do not talk about that film."

=== Awards ===
Jack Black received a nomination for favorite movie actor at the 2011 Kids' Choice Awards.

Black was also nominated for a Golden Raspberry Award for Worst Actor.

== See also ==
- List of films featuring miniature people
- List of films featuring powered exoskeletons
