= List of songs recorded by Tenacious D =

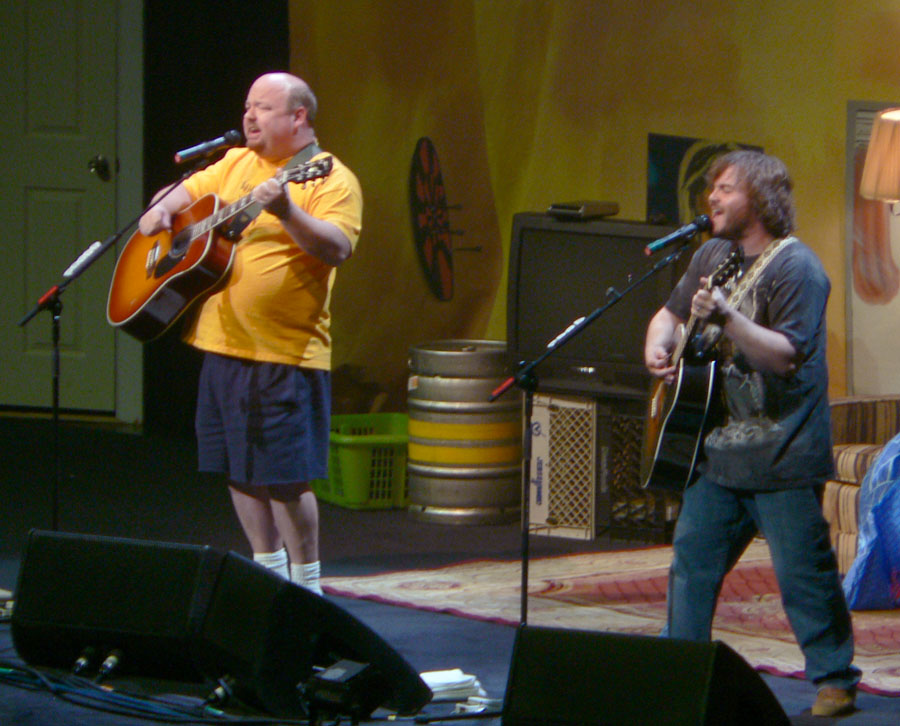
Kyle Gass (left) and Jack Black (right), the founding members of Tenacious D, have written the majority of the band's material.

Tenacious D is an American comedy rock band formed in 1994 by Jack Black and Kyle Gass. After starring in their own self-titled television series on HBO, the band released its self-titled debut album in 2001. All tracks on the album were credited to Black and Gass, with the exception of the skit "Friendship Test", written by Bob Odenkirk. For the album, Black and Gass worked with producers the Dust Brothers and a studio band featuring electric guitarist Warren Fitzgerald, bassist Steve McDonald, drummer Dave Grohl and keyboardist Page McConnell, as well as other contributors. "Tribute" and "Wonderboy" were released as singles, and the album reached number 33 on the US Billboard 200. A number of tracks from the album were also featured on The Complete Master Works, the duo's first video album, which also documents a performance in London in 2002.

In 2006 the band released The Pick of Destiny, their second studio album which acts as the soundtrack to their film of the same name. Supported by the single "POD", The Pick of Destiny reached number eight on the Billboard 200, and featured songwriting credits for a range of the album's contributors, including electric guitarist John Konesky, bassist John Spiker and the film's director and co-writer Liam Lynch. The album also saw the return of Dave Grohl on drums, as well as the inclusion of vocalists Meat Loaf and Ronnie James Dio, who both also had brief cameo appearances in the films opening track "Kickapoo". In 2008 the band released its second video album, The Complete Master Works 2, documenting two performances in Seattle, Washington from February 2007. This performance featured a full band composed of Black, Gass, Konesky, Spiker and drummer Brooks Wackerman.

After a six-year hiatus, Tenacious D returned in 2012 with their third studio album, Rize of the Fenix. Produced by John Kimbrough, who co-wrote two of the album's tracks and performed on four, the album once again featured Dave Grohl on drums, as well as the returning John Konesky on electric guitar and John Spiker on bass. Despite not supporting a film or TV series, like its two predecessors, Rize of the Fenix became the most successful album by the band in terms of chart performance, peaking at number four on the Billboard 200 and number two on the UK Albums Chart. The band also released the EP Jazz later in the year, featuring a jazz composition lasting over 11 minutes.

Outside of the band's own discography, Tenacious D have contributed to a number of other releases. In 2001, Black and Gass collaborated with Sum 41 on the Christmas track "Things I Want", written by Ralph Garman and released on the KROQ-FM album Kevin & Bean Present Swallow My Eggnog, hosted by Kevin & Bean. In 2014 the band also contributed a cover version of the Dio track "The Last in Line" for the tribute album Ronnie James Dio: This Is Your Life.

On November 2, 2018, Tenacious D's fourth studio album "Post-Apocalypto" was released. The album consists of 21 tracks, both songs and skits, which together form the plot to their YouTube animatic series "Tenacious D in Post-Apocalypto". The shows 6 parts were aired weekly as a lead up to the album, the last of which aired on the day of release. All six episodes were later compiled into a single film named "Post-Apocalypto: The Movie".

On November 29, 2019, for Record Store Day/Black Friday, Tenacious D released a 'Blue Series' 7" Single, featuring the track "Don't Blow It, Kage". The record was produced by The White Stripes member, Jack White.

Black has hinted towards there being more material released in the future, saying that the fifth album will take time, and "most likely be released [sometime] after 2020

On October 27th 2020, Tenacious D released a cover of 'Time Warp', available to stream online and also released on 7" vinyl. The song included a music video featuring a string of celebrity guests. The single was used to promote 'Rock the Vote', which encourages Americans to vote in the 2020 Presidential Election. All proceeds from the sale of the song were donated to Rock the Vote.

On July 1, 2021, Tenacious D released the single 'You Never Give Me Your Money / The End'. The song is a medley of the two Beatles songs of the same name. Proceeds from the single go to 'Doctors Without Borders'.

== Songs ==
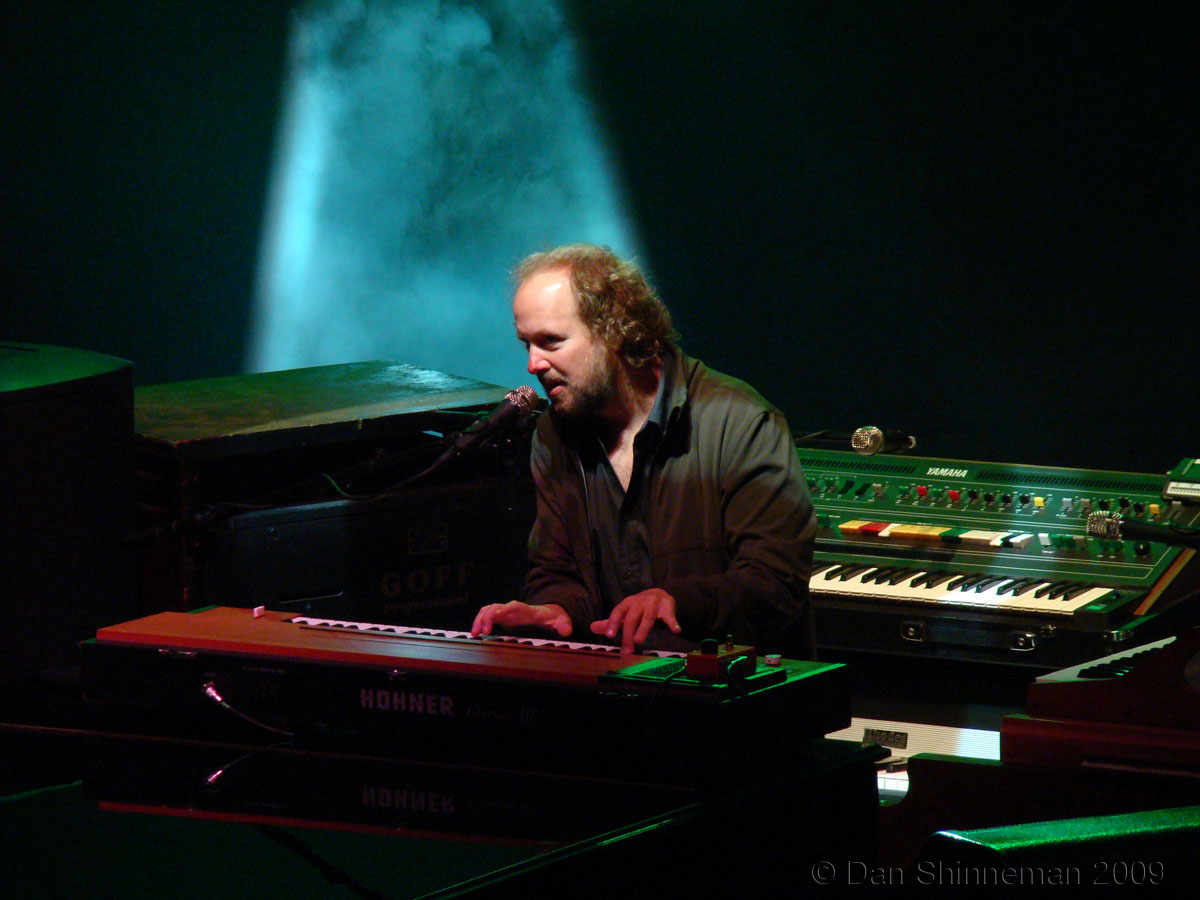
Keyboardist Page McConnell performed on Tenacious D and Rize of the Fenix.

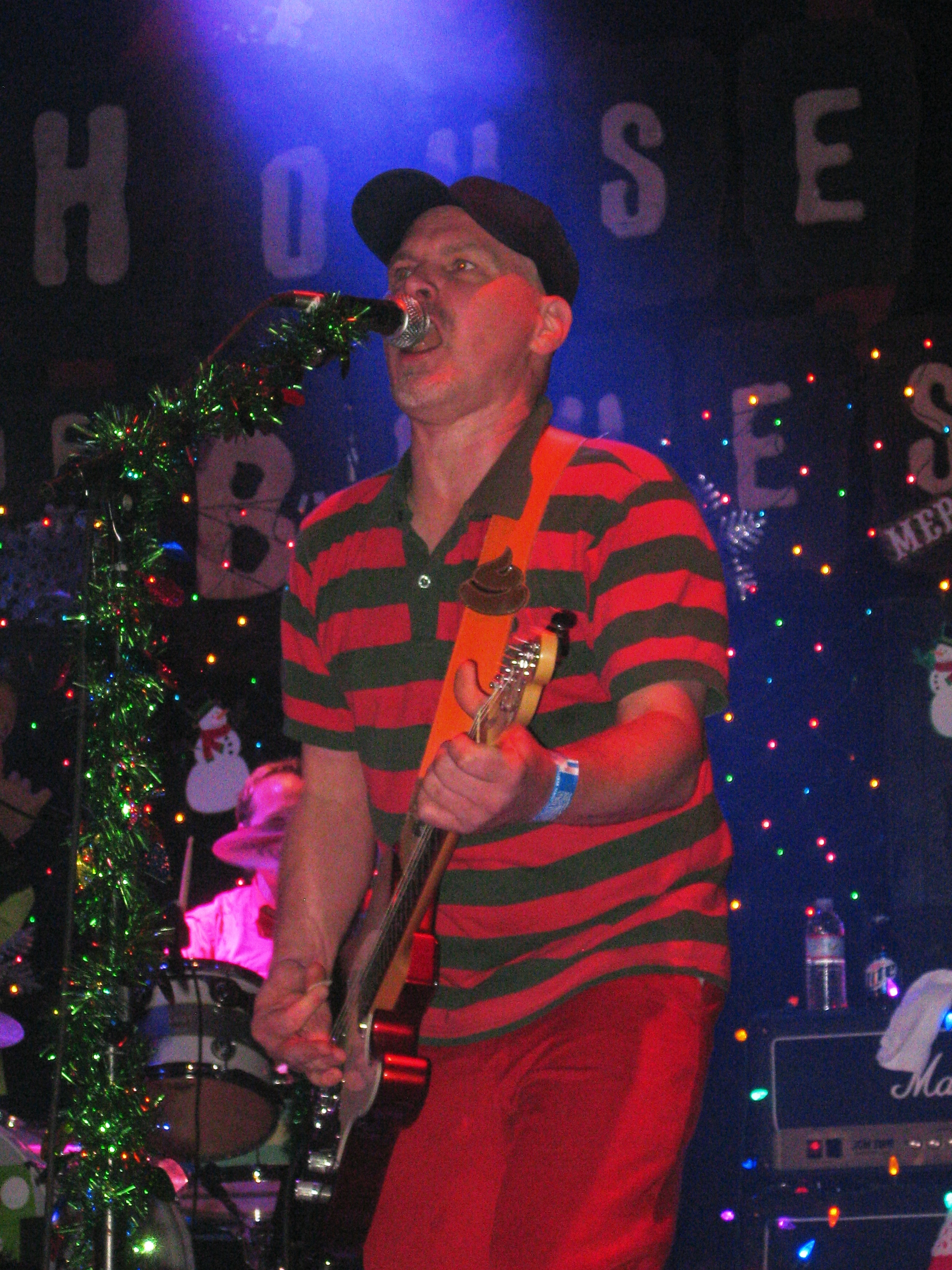
Warren Fitzgerald performed electric guitar on Tenacious D's debut album.

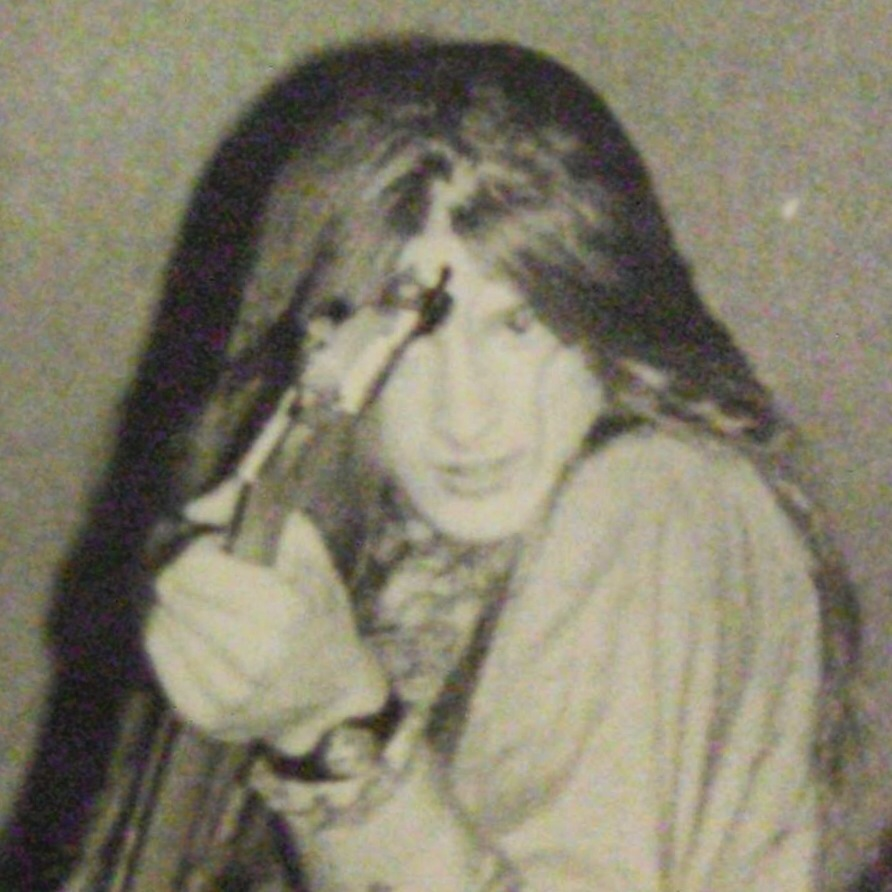
Steve McDonald contributed bass guitar to Tenacious D.

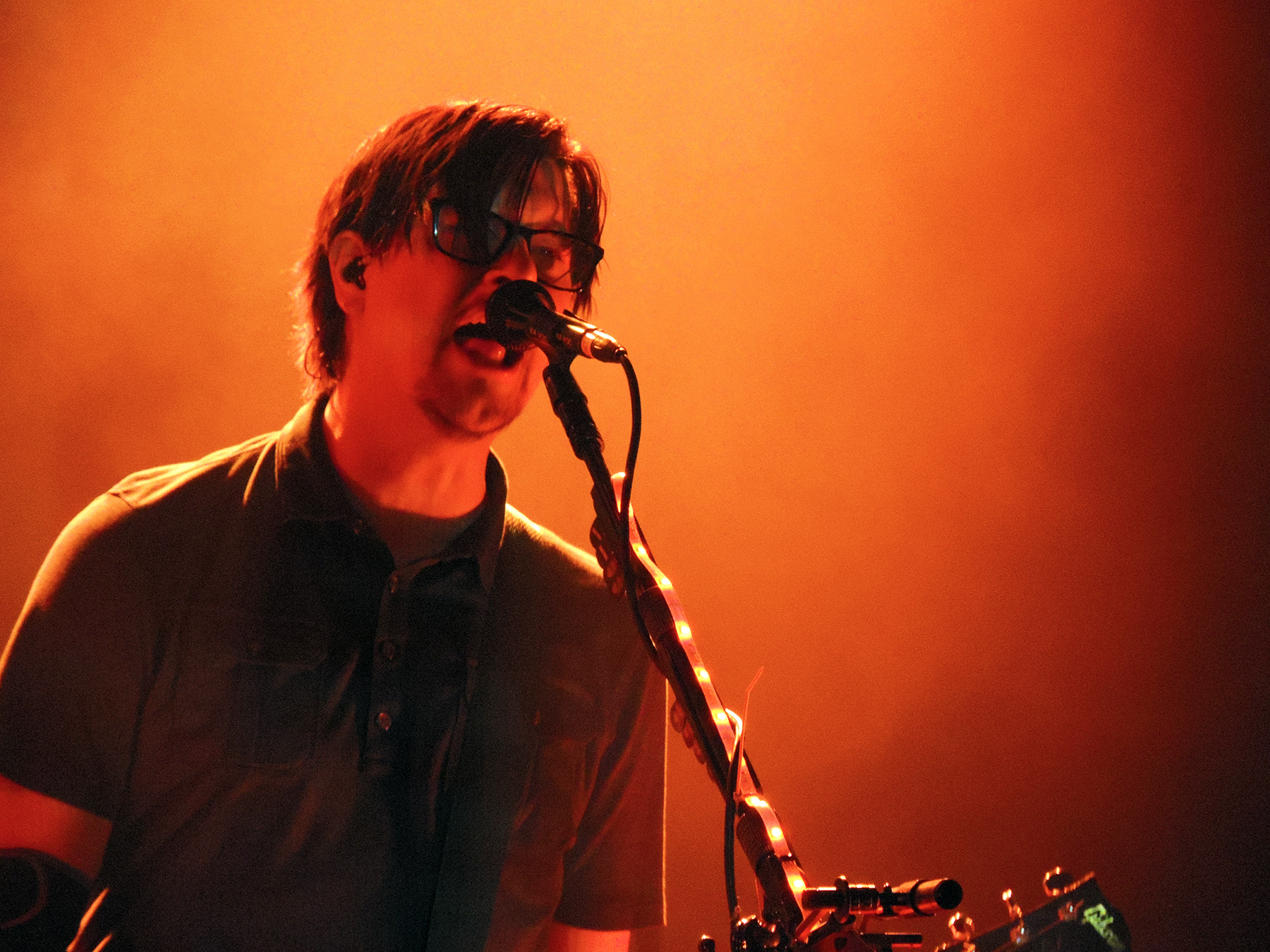
Ken Andrews performed guitar on four tracks of their debut album.

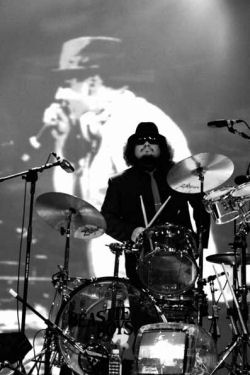
Alfredo Ortiz performed percussion on four tracks on 2001's Tenacious D.

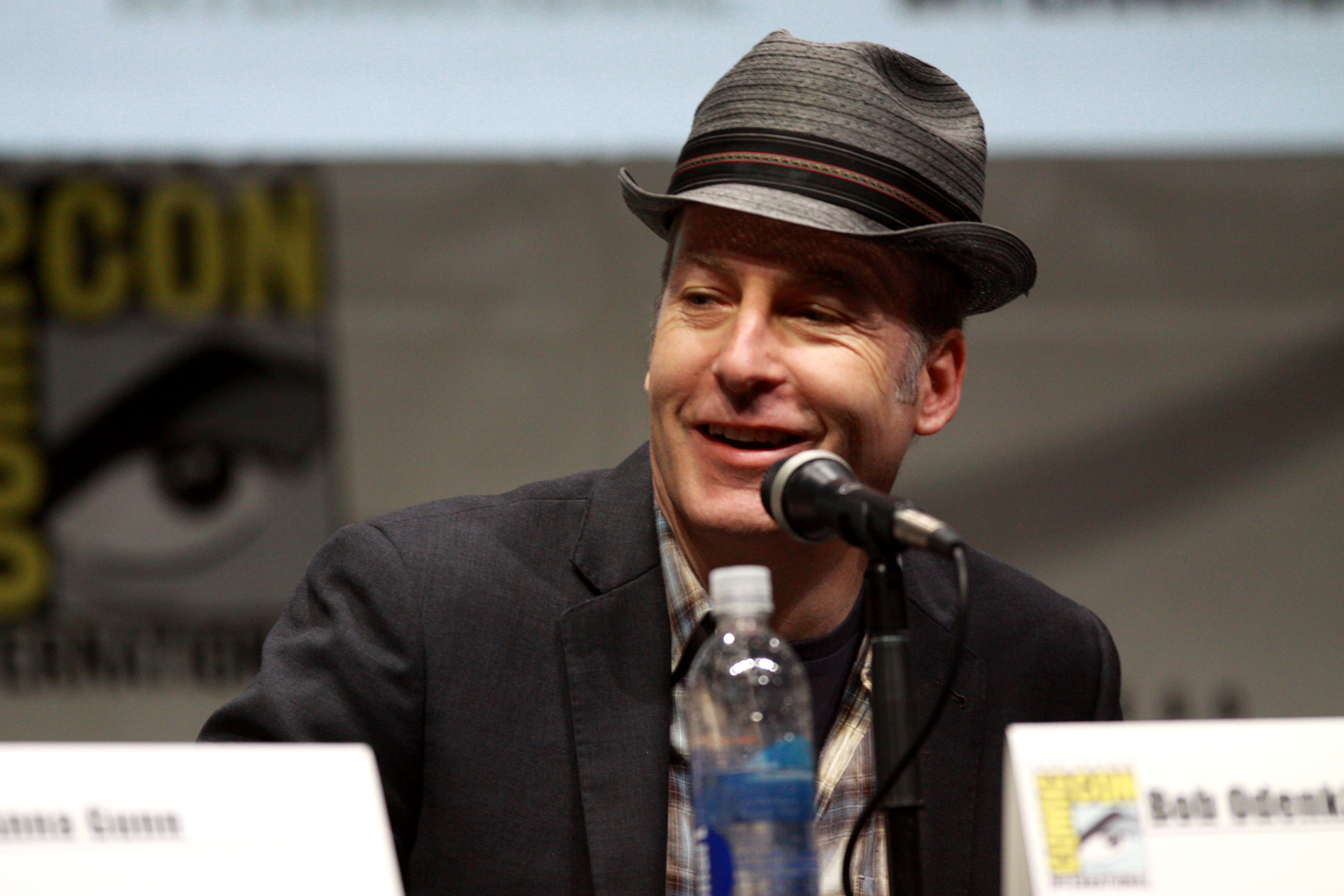
Bob Odenkirk, co-creator of the Tenacious D TV series, wrote "Friendship Test" and co-wrote "Flutes & Trombones".

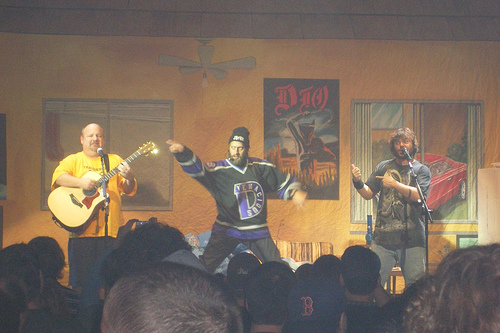
JR Reed, who plays "Lee" in the HBO show and feature film, (centre) co-wrote "Jesus Ranch" and has featured in a number of Tenacious D productions.

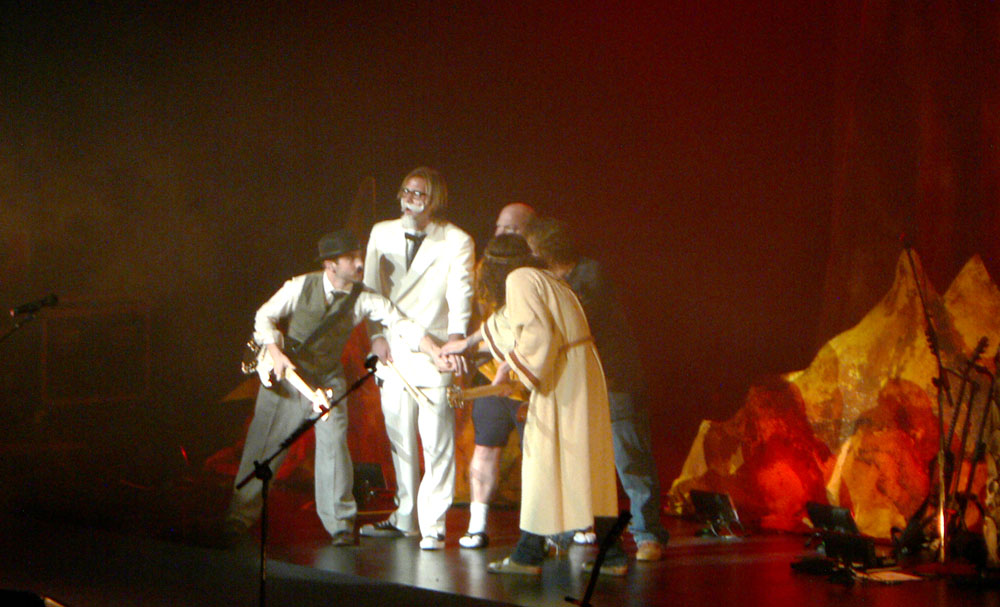
Bassist, John Spiker (far left) and guitarist, John Konesky, (far right) have both performed and co-written with the band.

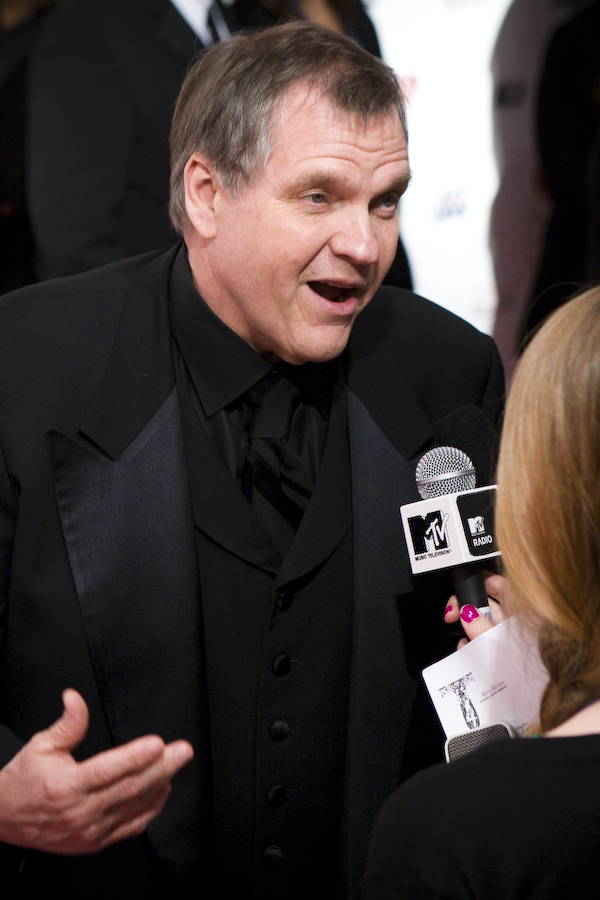
Vocalist Meat Loaf performed on the song "Kickapoo" from Tenacious D in The Pick of Destiny.

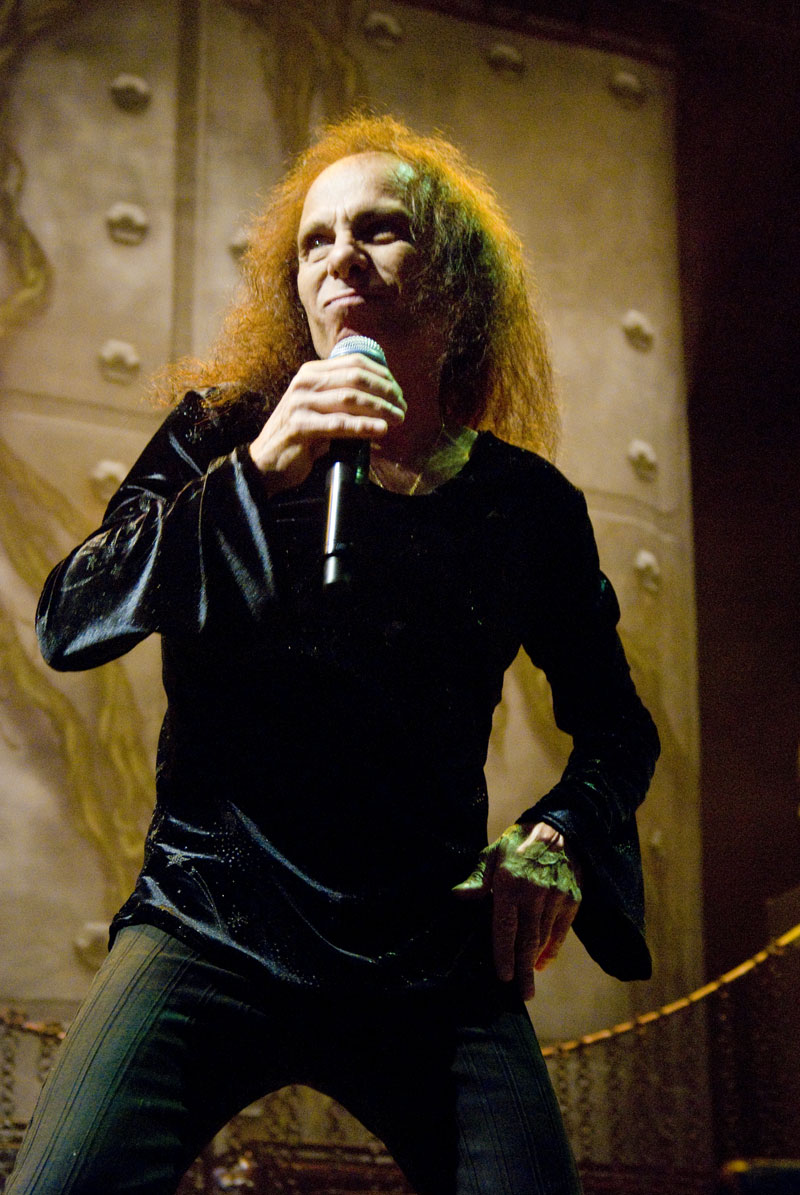
Rainbow and Black Sabbath front-man, Ronnie James Dio also featured on "Kickapoo" from Tenacious D in The Pick of Destiny

Key
†	Indicates song released as a single
‡	Indicates song written solely by Jack Black and Kyle Gass

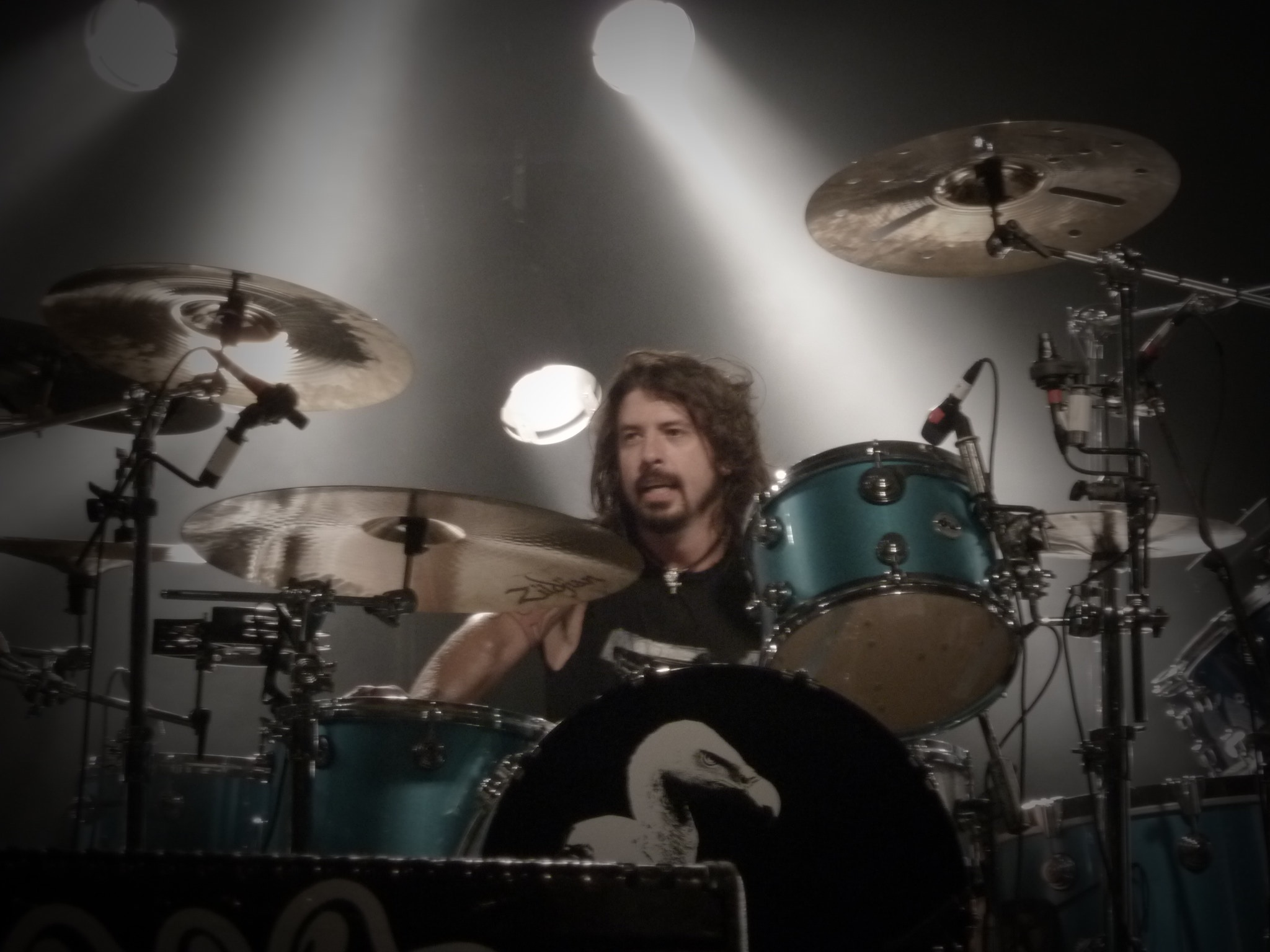
Nirvana and Foo Fighters member Dave Grohl has performed drums on all four studio albums.

Song	Songwriter(s)	Release	Year	Ref.	Notes
Wicked Game		Wicked Game	2023		
"Video Games"	Black, Gass	Video Games	2023		
"Tenacious D's The Who Medley"		Tenacious D's The Who Medley	2022		Medley of "Pinball Wizard, There's a Doctor, Go to the Mirror!"
"You Never Give Me Your Money / The End"	John Lennon Paul McCartney George Harrison Richard Starkey	You Never Give Me Your Money / The End	2021		(Medley of two Beatles songs, released digitally and on 7" vinyl,proceeds go to support Doctors Without Borders)
"Time Warp"	Richard O'Brien Richard Hartley	Time Warp	2020		(Promoting 'Rock the Vote' for the 2020 Presidential ElectionAvailable digitally or on vinyl)
"Don't Blow It, Kage"	Jack Black; Kyle Gass ‡	Blue Series	2019		(Record Store/Black Friday Exclusive, Available digitally or on vinyl. Produced by Jack White)
"Post-Apocalypto Theme"	Jack Black; Kyle Gass ‡	Post-Apocalypto	2018		
"Desolation" (skit)	Jack Black; Kyle Gass ‡	Post-Apocalypto	2018		
"Hope"	Jack Black; Kyle Gass ‡	Post-Apocalypto	2018		
"Cave Women" (skit)	Jack Black; Kyle Gass ‡	Post-Apocalypto	2018		
"Making Love"	Jack Black; Kyle Gass ‡	Post-Apocalypto	2018		
"Scientists" (skit)	Jack Black; Kyle Gass ‡	Post-Apocalypto	2018		
"Take Us Into Space"	Jack Black; Kyle Gass ‡	Post-Apocalypto	2018		
"I've Got to Go" (skit)	Jack Black; Kyle Gass ‡	Post-Apocalypto	2018		
"Fuck Yo-Yo Ma"	Jack Black; Kyle Gass ‡	Post-Apocalypto	2018		
"Reunion/Not So Fast" (skit)	Jack Black; Kyle Gass ‡	Post-Apocalypto	2018		
"Daddy Ding Dong"	Jack Black; Kyle Gass ‡	Post-Apocalypto	2018		
"Chainsaw Bazooka Machine Gun" (skit)	Jack Black; Kyle Gass ‡	Post-Apocalypto	2018		
"Robot"	Jack Black; Kyle Gass ‡	Post-Apocalypto	2018		
"March" (skit & song)	Jack Black; Kyle Gass ‡	Post-Apocalypto	2018		
"Turd Whistle" (skit)	Jack Black; Kyle Gass ‡	Post-Apocalypto	2018		
"Colors"	Jack Black; Kyle Gass ‡	Post-Apocalypto	2018		
"Who's Your Daddy?" (skit)	Jack Black; Kyle Gass ‡	Post-Apocalypto	2018		
"JB Jr Rap"	Jack Black; Kyle Gass ‡	Post-Apocalypto	2018		
"Woman Time"	Jack Black; Kyle Gass ‡	Post-Apocalypto	2018		
"Save the World"	Jack Black; Kyle Gass ‡	Post-Apocalypto	2018		
"Post-Apocalypto Theme (Reprise)"	Jack Black; Kyle Gass ‡	Post-Apocalypto	2018		
"It's Late"	Jack Black; Kyle Gass ‡	The Pick of Destiny	2014		(Digital download bonus track from the 2014 re-issue vinyl)
"The Last in Line"	Ronnie James Dio; Vivian Campbell; Jimmy Bain	Ronnie James Dio: This Is Your Life	2014		(A tribute to the late Ronnie James Dio)
"Pat Riley"	Jack Black; Kyle Gass ‡	Tenacious D	2013		(Digital download bonus track available with the 2013 re-issue vinyl)
"Rize of the Fenix" †	Jack Black; Kyle Gass; John Kimbrough	Rize of the Fenix	2012		
"Low Hangin' Fruit"	Jack Black; Kyle Gass ‡	Rize of the Fenix	2012		
"Classical Teacher" (skit)	Jack Black; Kyle Gass; J. D. Ryznar	Rize of the Fenix	2012		
"Señorita"	Jack Black; Kyle Gass; John Kimbrough	Rize of the Fenix	2012		
"Deth Starr"	Jack Black; Kyle Gass ‡	Rize of the Fenix	2012		
"Roadie"	Jack Black; Kyle Gass ‡	Rize of the Fenix	2012		
"Flutes & Trombones" (skit)	Jack Black; Kyle Gass; Bob Odenkirk	Rize of the Fenix	2012		
"The Ballad of Hollywood Jack and the Rage Kage"	Jack Black; Kyle Gass ‡	Rize of the Fenix	2012		
"Throw Down"	Jack Black; Kyle Gass ‡	Rize of the Fenix	2012		
"Rock Is Dead"	Jack Black; Kyle Gass ‡	Rize of the Fenix	2012		
"They Fucked Our Asses"	Jack Black; Kyle Gass ‡	Rize of the Fenix	2012		
"To Be the Best"	Jack Black; Kyle Gass ‡	Rize of the Fenix	2012		
"39"	Jack Black; Kyle Gass ‡	Rize of the Fenix	2012		
"5 Needs"	Jack Black; Kyle Gass ‡	Rize of the Fenix 5 Needs	2012		Originally released in 2012 as a bonus track for pre-orders of Rize of the Fenix on iTunes. Was later re-released as a digital single in 2020 to support the 2019-20 coronavirus pandemic.
"Quantum Leap"	Jack Black; Kyle Gass ‡	Rize of the Fenix	2012		(Deluxe Edition Bonus Track)
"Rivers of Brown"	Jack Black; Kyle Gass ‡	Rize of the Fenix	2012		(Deluxe Edition Bonus Track)
"Simply Jazz"	Jack Black; Kyle Gass; John Konesky; John Spiker; Brooks Wackerman	Jazz	2012		
"Nothing on Side B" (skit)	Jack Black; Kyle Gass ‡	Jazz	2012		
"Kickapoo"	Jack Black; Kyle Gass; Liam Lynch	The Pick of Destiny	2006		(Was also featured on "The Complete Masterworks 2")
"Classico"	Jack Black; Kyle Gass ‡	The Pick of Destiny	2006		
"Baby"	Jack Black; Kyle Gass ‡	The Pick of Destiny	2006		
"Destiny"	Jack Black; Kyle Gass ‡	The Pick of Destiny	2006		
"History"	Jack Black; Kyle Gass ‡	The Pick of Destiny	2006		(Was also featured on "The Complete Masterworks 2")
"The Government Totally Sucks"	Jack Black; Kyle Gass ‡	The Pick of Destiny	2006		
"Master Exploder"	Jack Black; Kyle Gass ‡	The Pick of Destiny	2006		(Was also featured on "The Complete Masterworks 2", as well as the single "POD")
"The Divide"	Jack Black; Kyle Gass ‡	The Pick of Destiny	2006		
"Papagenu (He's My Sassafrass)"	Jack Black; Kyle Gass; Liam Lynch; John King	The Pick of Destiny	2006		(Was also featured on "The Complete Masterworks 2")
"Dude (I Totally Miss You)"	Jack Black; Kyle Gass ‡	The Pick of Destiny	2006		(Was also featured on "The Complete Masterworks 2")
"Break In-City (Storm the Gate!)"	Jack Black; Kyle Gass; Liam Lynch; John King	The Pick of Destiny	2006		
"Car Chase City"	Jack Black; Kyle Gass; John King; John Konesky; John Spiker	The Pick of Destiny	2006		
"Beelzeboss (The Final Showdown)"	Jack Black; Kyle Gass; Liam Lynch	The Pick of Destiny	2006		(Was also featured on "The Complete Masterworks 2")
"POD" †	Jack Black; Kyle Gass ‡	The Pick of Destiny	2006		
"The Metal"	Jack Black; Kyle Gass; John King; John Konesky	The Pick of Destiny	2006		(Was also featured on "The Complete Masterworks 2")
"Rock Your Socks (Acoustic)"	Jack Black; Kyle Gass ‡	The Pick of Destiny	2006		(Acoustic version of the song of the same name, found on "Tenacious D")
"Training Medley"	Jack Black; Kyle Gass ‡	The Pick of Destiny	2006		(Best Buy digital download, also available on the "POD" single and Japanese release)
"Kong"	Jack Black; Kyle Gass ‡	The Pick of Destiny	2006		(Japanese Bonus Track, also available on the "POD" 7" Single)
"Aussie Medley"	Bon Scott Angus Young Malcolm Young Rob Hirst Jim Moginie Peter Garrett Colin Hay	Triple M Musical Challenge 3 – Third Time Lucky!	2002		(Compilation of songs by Australian musicians, including: "Highway to Hell" by AC/DC, "Beds Are Burning" by Midnight Oil and "Overkill" by Men At Work)
"Cave Intro (Demo)" (skit)	Jack Black; Kyle Gass ‡	D Fun Pak	2002		(Was also featured on a version of the single "Tribute")
"Jesus Ranch (Demo)"	Jack Black; Kyle Gass; JR Reed; Michael Rivken	D Fun Pak	2002		(Demo version of the song of the same name, found on "Tenacious D")
"Kyle Quit The Band (Demo)" (skit & song)	Jack Black; Kyle Gass ‡	D Fun Pak	2002		(Demo version of the song of the same name, found on "Tenacious D")
"Explosivo (Mocean Worker's Megamix)"	Jack Black; Kyle Gass Mocean Worker	D Fun Pak	2002		(Remix of "Explosivo" by Mocean Worker that uses snippets of various skits from "Tenacious D")
"Kielbasa"	Jack Black; Kyle Gass ‡	Tenacious D	2001		(Was also featured on "The Complete Masterworks" & "The Complete Masterworks 2")
"One Note Song" (skit)	Jack Black; Kyle Gass ‡	Tenacious D	2001		
"Tribute" †	Jack Black; Kyle Gass ‡	Tenacious D	2001		(Was also featured on "The Complete Masterworks" & "The Complete Masterworks 2")
"Wonderboy" †	Jack Black; Kyle Gass ‡	Tenacious D	2001		(Was also featured on "The Complete Masterworks" & "The Complete Masterworks 2")
"Hard Fucking" (skit)	Jack Black; Kyle Gass ‡	Tenacious D	2001		
"Fuck Her Gently"	Jack Black; Kyle Gass ‡	Tenacious D	2001		(Was also featured on "The Complete Masterworks" & "The Complete Masterworks 2")
"Explosivo"	Jack Black; Kyle Gass ‡	Tenacious D	2001		(Was also featured on "The Complete Masterworks", as well as the single "Tribute")
"Dio"	Jack Black; Kyle Gass ‡	Tenacious D	2001		(Was also featured on "The Complete Masterworks" & "The Complete Masterworks 2")
"Inward Singing" (skit)	Jack Black; Kyle Gass ‡	Tenacious D	2001		
"Kyle Quit the Band"	Jack Black; Kyle Gass ‡	Tenacious D	2001		(Was also featured on "The Complete Masterworks" & "The Complete Masterworks 2", as well as the singles "Tribute" and "Wonderboy" A demo version appears on the extended play D Fun Pak.)
"The Road"	Jack Black; Kyle Gass ‡	Tenacious D	2001		(Was also featured on "The Complete Masterworks" & "The Complete Masterworks 2")
"Cock Pushups" (skit)	Jack Black; Kyle Gass ‡	Tenacious D	2001		
"Lee"	Jack Black; Kyle Gass ‡	Tenacious D	2001		(Was also featured on "The Complete Masterworks 2")
"Friendship Test" (skit)	Bob Odenkirk	Tenacious D	2001		
"Friendship"	Jack Black; Kyle Gass ‡	Tenacious D	2001		(Was also featured on "The Complete Masterworks" & "The Complete Masterworks 2", as well as the single "Tribute")
"Karate Schnitzel" (skit)	Jack Black; Kyle Gass ‡	Tenacious D	2001		
"Karate"	Jack Black; Kyle Gass ‡	Tenacious D	2001		(Was also featured on "The Complete Masterworks" & "The Complete Masterworks 2")
"Rock Your Socks"	Jack Black; Kyle Gass ‡	Tenacious D	2001		(Was also featured on "The Complete Masterworks" & the iTunes pre-order version of The Pick of Destiny)
"Drive-Thru" (skit)	Jack Black; Kyle Gass ‡	Tenacious D	2001		
"Double Team"	Jack Black; Kyle Gass ‡	Tenacious D	2001		(Was also featured on "The Complete Masterworks" & "The Complete Masterworks 2")
"City Hall"	Jack Black; Kyle Gass ‡	Tenacious D	2001		(Also contains the hidden tracks; "I Believe" (skit) & "Malibu Nights Medley)
"Jesus Ranch"	Jack Black; Kyle Gass; JR Reed; Michael Rivken	Tenacious D	2001		(Digitally downloadable exclusive track, available from TenaciousD.com to those who ordered the album within the first week of release)
"Things I Want"	Ralph Garman	Kevin & Bean Present; Swallow My Eggnog	2001		(A collaboration between "Tenacious D" and "Sum 41")
"Tribute (Demo)"	Jack Black; Kyle Gass ‡	Tenacious Demo	1990s		(This song would later be professionally recorded and released under the same name on "Tenacious D")
"History (Demo)"	Jack Black; Kyle Gass ‡	Tenacious Demo	1990s		(This song would later be professionally recorded and released under the same name on "The Pick Of Destiny")
"Kyle Quit (Demo)"	Jack Black; Kyle Gass ‡	Tenacious Demo	1990s		(This song would later be professionally recorded and released under the name "Kyle Quit the Band"on "Tenacious D")
"Krishna (Demo)"	Jack Black; Kyle Gass ‡	Tenacious Demo	1990s		(As of yet, this song has not received a professional re-release.)

Songs Featured In Official Media Outside Of Recording
Song name	Year	Featured Release	Notes
"Kyle Took A Bullet For Me"	1999	Tenacious D: The Greatest Band on Earth	
"Cosmic Shame"	1999	Tenacious D: The Greatest Band on Earth	A live version was featured on a version of the 2002 single "Tribute" It was Recorded at Cox Arena in San Diego on November 20, 2001.
"Sasquatch"	1999	Tenacious D: The Greatest Band on Earth	
"Special Things"	2000	Tenacious D: The Greatest Band on Earth	
"Warning"	2000	Tenacious D: The Greatest Band on Earth	

== See also ==
- Tenacious D discography
