= Tenacious D discography =

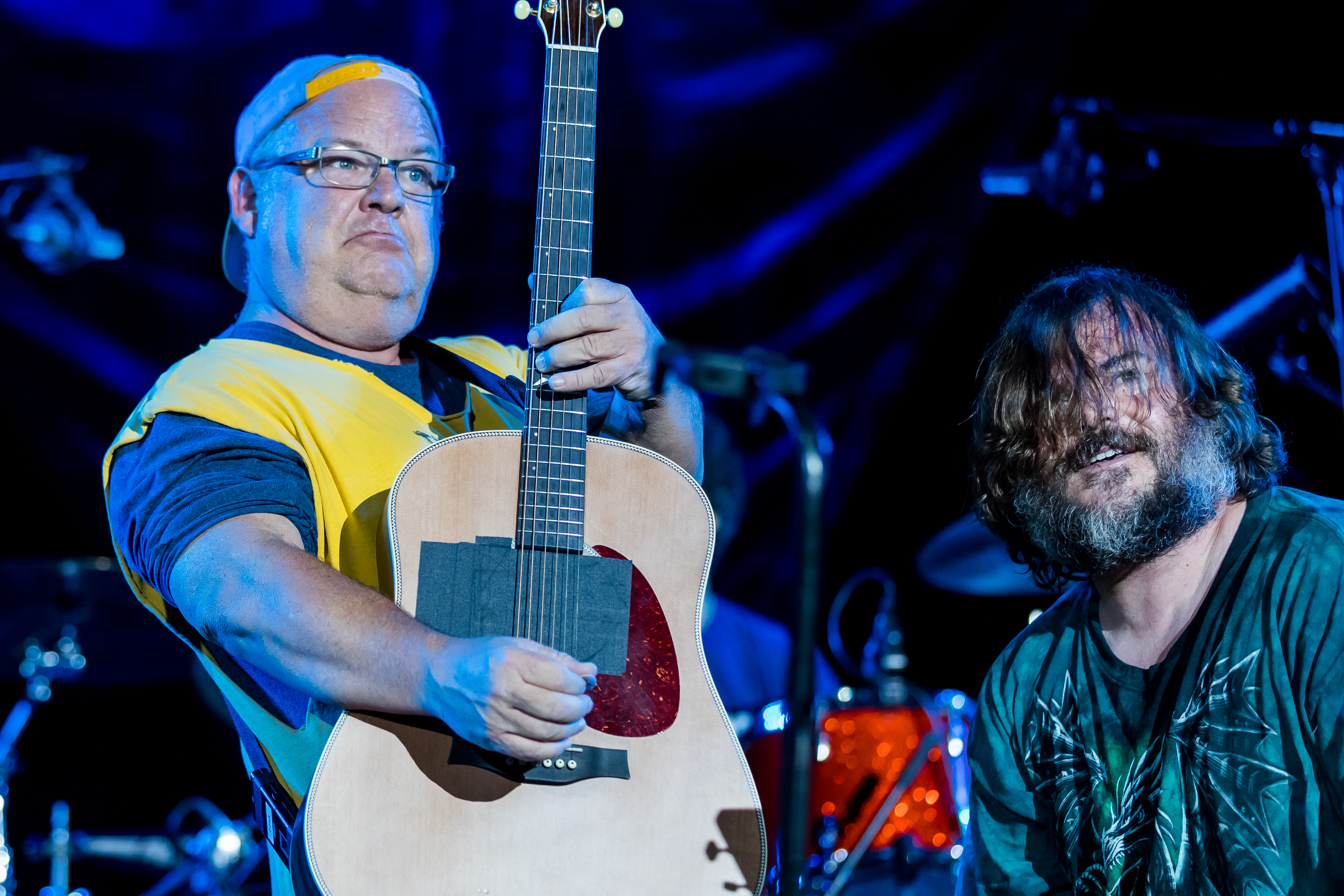
- Tenacious D performing in 2016.
- Studio albums: 4
- Extended plays: 2
- Live albums: 1
- Singles: 8
- Video albums: 2
- Music videos: 10
- Other appearances: 4

The discography of Tenacious D, an American comedy rock band, consists of four studio albums, one live album, one extended play (EP), six singles, two video albums, ten music videos and four other appearances. Formed in Los Angeles, California in 1994, the band is a duo composed of lead vocalist Jack Black and lead acoustic guitarist Kyle Gass, who perform with additional members during "full band" shows. After signing with Epic Records, the band released its self-titled debut album in 2001, which featured Dave Grohl on drums, Warren Fitzgerald on electric guitar and Steven McDonald on bass, among other contributors. The album reached number 33 on the US Billboard 200 and was certified platinum by the Recording Industry Association of America (RIAA). Lead single "Tribute" peaked at number 4 on the Australian Singles Chart, where it was certified platinum, and number 9 on the New Zealand Singles Chart, where it was certified gold.

Tenacious D released its first video album The Complete Master Works in 2003, which was recorded live during the promotional concert tour for Tenacious D. The album reached number 2 on the Billboard Music Video Sales chart and was certified six times platinum by the RIAA. The band's second studio album The Pick of Destiny, released in 2006, served as the soundtrack to the band's feature film of the same name. The album reached the top ten of the Billboard 200, the Irish Albums Chart, and the UK Albums Chart, receiving a platinum certification from the Irish Recorded Music Association (IRMA) and a gold certification from the British Phonographic Industry (BPI). The album's only single "POD" reached number 78 on the Billboard Hot 100. The band's second video album The Complete Master Works 2 was released in 2008 and reached number 2 on the Billboard Music Video Sales chart.

After a brief hiatus, Tenacious D returned in 2012 with its third studio album Rize of the Fenix. The album was the band's most successful in terms of chart positions, reaching peaks of number 4 on the Billboard 200 and number 2 on the UK Albums Chart. Later in the year the band released the single "Jazz", which registered on the Billboard Hot Single Sales chart at number 25. In 2014, Tenacious D covered Dio's "The Last in Line" for the Ronnie James Dio tribute album Ronnie James Dio: This Is Your Life, and in 2015 the group released its first live album Tenacious D Live. The album reached number 2 on the Billboard Comedy Albums chart.

In 2018, Tenacious D release their fourth studio album Post-Apocalypto. The album consists of 21 tracks, both songs and skits, which together form the plot to their YouTube animatic series of the same name. The show's six parts were aired weekly as a lead up to the album, the last of which aired on the day of release. All six episodes on the show were later compiled into a single film Post-Apocalypto: The Movie. In 2019, for Record Store Day/Black Friday, Tenacious D released a 'Blue Series' 7" single, featuring the track "Don't Blow It, Kage". The record was produced by Jack White. In 2020, the band released a cover of "Time Warp", available to stream online and also released on 7" vinyl. The song included a music video featuring a string of celebrity guests, and was made for Rock the Vote's efforts to encourage young Americans to vote in the 2020 presidential election. All proceeds from the sale of the song were donated to Rock the Vote.

== Albums ==
=== Studio albums ===
List of studio albums, with selected chart positions and certifications
| Title | Album details | Peak chart positions | | | | | | | | | | Certifications |
| Title | Album details | US | AUS | AUT | GER | IRL | NED | NZ | SWE | SWI | UK | Certifications |
|---|---|---|---|---|---|---|---|---|---|---|---|---|
| Tenacious D | Released: September 25, 2001; Label: Epic; Formats: CD, LP | 33 | 13 | — | 96 | 18 | 33 | 42 | 19 | 91 | 38 | RIAA: Platinum; ARIA: Gold; BVMI: Gold; BPI: 2× Platinum; IFPI AUT: Gold |
| The Pick of Destiny | Released: November 14, 2006; Label: Epic; Formats: CD, LP | 8 | 35 | 64 | 47 | 9 | — | — | 44 | 82 | 10 | BPI: Platinum; IFPI AUT: Gold; IRMA: Platinum |
| Rize of the Fenix | Released: May 15, 2012; Label: Columbia; Formats: CD, LP, CD+DVD, DL | 4 | 6 | 2 | 5 | 4 | 16 | 11 | 15 | 4 | 2 | BPI: Silver |
| Post-Apocalypto | Released: November 2, 2018; Label: Columbia; Formats: CD, LP, DL | 93 | 59 | 19 | 30 | — | — | — | — | 21 | 47 | |
"—" denotes a release that did not chart or was not issued in that region.

=== Live albums ===
List of live albums, with selected chart positions
| Title | Album details | Peaks | |
| Title | Album details | US Com. | BEL (Fla.) |
|---|---|---|---|
| Tenacious D Live | Released: November 27, 2015; Label: Columbia; Formats: LP, DL | 2 | 128 |

== Extended plays ==
List of extended plays
| Title | EP details |
|---|---|
| D Fun Pak | Released: April 29, 2002; Label: Epic; Format: CD |
| Jazz | Released: November 23, 2012; Label: Columbia; Format: Vinyl, DL |

== Singles ==
List of singles, with selected chart positions and certifications, showing year released and album name
| Title | Year | Peak chart positions | | | | | | | | | | Certifications | Album/EP |
| Title | Year | US | US Com. Digi. | US Digi. | US Sales | AUS | IRL | NED | NZ | UK | UK Rock | Certifications | Album/EP |
|---|---|---|---|---|---|---|---|---|---|---|---|---|---|
| "Wonderboy" | 2001 | — | — | — | — | 48 | 47 | — | — | 34 | — | | Tenacious D |
| "Tribute" | 2002 | — | — | — | — | 4 | — | 26 | 9 | 84 | 1 | ARIA: Platinum; BPI: Platinum; RMNZ: Gold | Tenacious D |
| "POD" | 2006 | 78 | — | 36 | — | — | 20 | — | — | 24 | — | | The Pick of Destiny |
| "Rize of the Fenix" | 2012 | — | 9 | — | — | — | — | — | — | — | — | | Rize of the Fenix |
| "Jazz" | 2012 | — | — | — | 25 | — | — | — | — | — | — | | Jazz |
| "Don't Blow It, Kage" | 2019 | — | — | — | — | — | — | — | — | — | | | Blue Series |
| "5 Needs" | 2020 | — | — | — | — | — | — | — | — | — | — | | Rize of the Fenix |
| "Time Warp" | 2020 | — | — | — | — | — | — | — | — | — | — | | Non-album single |
| "I Think I Love You" | 2020 | — | — | — | — | — | — | — | — | — | — | | The Croods: A New Age (soundtrack) |
| "Video Games" | 2023 | — | — | — | — | — | — | — | — | — | — | | Non-album single |
| "...Baby One More Time" | 2024 | — | — | 9 | — | — | — | — | — (Note: "...Baby One More Time" did not enter the NZ Top 40 Singles Chart, but peaked at number 11 on the NZ Hot Singles Chart.) | — | — | | Kung Fu Panda 4 (soundtrack) |
"—" denotes a release that did not chart or was not issued in that region.

== Other charted songs ==
List of songs, with selected chart positions, showing year released and album name
| Title | Year | Peak | Certifications | Album |
| Title | Year | UK Down. | Certifications | Album |
|---|---|---|---|---|
| "Fuck Her Gently" | 2006 | 142 | BPI: Silver | Tenacious D |
| "Classico" | 2006 | 161 | | The Pick of Destiny |

== Videos ==
=== Video albums ===
List of video albums, with selected chart positions and certifications
| Title | Album details | Peak positions | | | Certifications |
| Title | Album details | US | AUS | UK | Certifications |
|---|---|---|---|---|---|
| The Complete Master Works | Released: November 4, 2003; Label: Epic; Format: 2×DVD | 2 | 19 | 9 | RIAA: 6× Platinum; ARIA: 2× Platinum; BPI: Platinum |
| The Complete Master Works 2 | Released: November 4, 2008; Label: Epic; Format: 2×DVD, BD | 2 | — | 21 | |
| The Complete Master Works 3 | Released: October 3, 2025; Label: MVD Visual; Format: 2×DVD, BD | — | — | — | |
"—" denotes a release that did not chart or was not issued in that region.

=== Music videos ===
List of music videos, showing year released and directors names
| Title | Year | Director(s) | Ref. |
|---|---|---|---|
| "Wonderboy" | 2001 | Spike Jonze | |
| "Fuck Her Gently" | 2001 | Gabe Swarr | |
| "Tribute" | 2002 | Liam Lynch | |
| "POD" | 2006 | Liam Lynch | |
| "Classico" | 2006 | John Kricfalusi | |
| "To Be the Best" | 2012 | Jeremy Konner | |
| "Rize of the Fenix" | 2012 | Daniel Kwan, Daniel Scheinert | |
| "Roadie" | 2012 | Jody Hill | |
| "Low Hangin' Fruit" | 2012 | Liam Lynch | |
| "Rock Is Dead" | 2012 | Liam Lynch | |
| "Video Games" | 2023 | Adam Paloian, Chris O'Neill | |
| "...Baby One More Time" | 2024 | Taylor Stephens | |

== Other appearances ==
List of other appearances, showing year released and album name
| Title | Year | Album | Ref. |
|---|---|---|---|
| "Things I Want" (with Sum 41) | 2001 | KROQ Kevin & Bean: Swallow My Eggnog | |
| "Aussie Medley" | 2002 | Triple M Musical Challenge 3 – Third Time Lucky! | |
| "Kiss Your Ass Goodbye" (with Styx) | 2003 | Cyclorama | |
| "The Last in Line" | 2014 | Ronnie James Dio: This Is Your Life | |
