= Tenacious D Live =

Live album by Tenacious D
- Released: November 27, 2015
- Recorded: 2012–13
- Venue: Red Rocks Amphitheatre, Morrison, Colorado July 26, 2012; Tap 1, Copenhagen, Denmark; Spandau Citadel, Berlin, Germany
- Genre: Comedy rock, hard rock, acoustic rock, heavy metal
- Length: 38:36
- Label: Columbia
- Producer: John Spiker

Tenacious D chronology
Jazz (2012)	Tenacious D Live (2015)	Post-Apocalypto (2018)

Tenacious D Live is the first live album by American rock band Tenacious D. Produced by John Spiker, it was released as a worldwide vinyl on November 27, 2015 by Columbia Records and was released on digital platforms on January 15, 2016. The release features recordings from the band's 2012 Rize of the Fenix tour and their 2013 European tour and has 11 songs in total. It features songs from their debut album, their Rize of the Fenix album, and their The Pick of Destiny album.

== Track listing ==
All tracks written by Jack Black and Kyle Gass, except where noted.

No.	Title	Writer(s)	Length
1.	"Rize of the Fenix" (Zitadelle – August 13th 2013 – Berlin, Germany)	Jack Black; Kyle Gass; John Kimbrough	4:23
2.	"Low Hangin' Fruit" (Tap 1 – August 12th 2013 – Copenhagen, Denmark)		3:22
3.	"Kielbasa" (Tap 1 – August 12th 2013 – Copenhagen, Denmark)		3:06
4.	"Friendship" (Zitadelle – August 13th 2013 – Berlin, Germany)		2:17
5.	"Throw Down" (Tap 1 – August 12th 2013 – Copenhagen, Denmark)		3:12
6.	"39" (Red Rocks Amphitheatre – July 26th 2012 – Colorado, United States)		3:33
7.	"The Metal" (Zitadelle – August 13th 2013 – Berlin, Germany)	Black; Gass; John Konesky; John King	3:05
8.	"Roadie" (Tap 1 – August 12th 2013 – Copenhagen, Denmark)		3:26
9.	"Wonderboy" (Red Rocks Amphitheatre – July 26th 2012 – Colorado, United States)		4:00
10.	"Tribute" (Zitadelle – August 13th 2013 – Berlin, Germany)		4:50
11.	"Fuck Her Gently" (Tap 1 – August 12th 2013 – Copenhagen, Denmark)		3:22
Total length:			38:36

== Personnel ==
- Jack Black – vocals, acoustic guitar
- Kyle Gass – acoustic guitar, backing vocals
- John Konesky – electric guitar
- John Spiker – bass, piano
- Brooks Wackerman – drums (2012 recordings)
- Scott Seiver – drums (2013 recordings)
