= Tenacious D (disambiguation) =

Tenacious D is a comedy rock duo

Tenacious D may also refer to:

- Tenacious D (album), the duo's self-titled debut album
- Tenacious D (TV series), a television series following the duo
