= D Tour: A Tenacious Documentary =

- Directed by: Jeremy Konner
- Starring: Jack Black, Kyle Gass
- Edited by: James Atkinson, Eric Binns, Jeremy Konner, Kevin Mayfield
- Release date: January 31, 2008 (Santa Barbara Film Festival)
- Running time: 71 minutes
- Country: United States
- Language: English

D Tour: A Tenacious Documentary is a 2008 documentary film directed by Jeremy Konner. It was premiered at the 2008 Santa Barbara film festival on January 31, 2008. The film focuses on the tour Tenacious D made in support of the film and soundtrack of Tenacious D in The Pick of Destiny and the consequences of their film's poor showing at the box office. The film has been released on DVD and Blu-ray in The Complete Master Works 2, which also contains a full live show.
