= The Complete Master Works =

Video by Tenacious D
- Released: November 4, 2003
- Length: 3:26:00
- Label: Sony Music

Tenacious D chronology
The Complete Master Works (2003)	The Complete Master Works 2 (2008)

Back cover
- The back cover showing the pick.

The Complete Master Works is a two-DVD set by Tenacious D, documenting their gig at the Brixton Academy on November 3, 2002. The DVD also contains the band's TV series, a collection of short films, two documentaries on the band, music videos, and live TV appearances. The video was a major success, going 6× platinum in the US and 2× platinum in Australia in the Video Longform category. The disc's cover features band members Jack Black and Kyle Gass in Baroque era costume, replete with powdered wigs, a violin and harpsichord.

This release was followed by two sequels, The Complete Master Works 2 (2008) and The Complete Master Works 3 (2025).

Professional ratings
Review scores
Source	Rating
Allmusic	link
Uncut link	4/5 stars
Entertainment Weekly	link (A−)

== Features ==
=== Disc one: For Fans ===
Jack Black and Kyle Gass, except where noted.

==== Concert ====
1. "Program Start"
2. "Flash" (Brian May)
3. "Wonderboy"
4. "Explosivo"
5. "Medley"
  - "Crazy Train" (Ozzy Osbourne, Randy Rhoads, Bob Daisley)
  - "(Don't Fear) The Reaper" (Donald Roeser)
  - "Paranoid Android" (Radiohead)
  - "Mr. Brownstone" (Izzy Stradlin, Slash)
6. "Karate"
7. "Kyle Quit the Band"
8. "Friendship"
9. "Kielbasa"
10. "Dio"
11. "The Road"
12. "The Cosmic Shame"
13. "Fuck Her Gently"
14. "Tribute"
15. "Rock Your Socks"
16. "Double Team"

==== HBO episodes ====
Episodes from the HBO TV series Tenacious D.

1. "The Search for Inspirado": Jack and Kyle need to write a new song for their next Open Mic performance.
  - "Kielbasa"
  - "History"
  - "Kyle Quit the Band"
2. "Angel in Disguise": Jack becomes jealous when Kyle falls in love with his crush, Florna.
  - "Double Team"
  - "Kyle Took a Bullet"
3. "Death of a Dream" The record store owner tells Jack and Kyle not to fall victim to the Rock Star Mythos.
  - "Cosmic Shame"
  - "In Search of Sasquatch"
4. "The Greatest Song in the World": Jack and Kyle make too much noise with their "pre-show rituals" and disturb their neighbor who is trying to concentrate on his writing.
  - "Tribute"
5. "The Fan": Jack and Kyle meet their biggest fan, Lee. They return the favor by trying to become his biggest fan.
  - "Explosivo"
  - "Lee"
  - "Special Things"
6. "Road Gig": In search of wiper fluid while en route to a new club, Jack and Kyle stumble upon the house of a strange cult.
  - "Warning"
  - "The Road"
  - "History"
  - "Jesus Ranch"

=== Disc 2: For Psycho Fans Only ===
==== HBO short films ====
- JB's BJ: This short sees Jack acting as a male prostitute, who unknowingly gives Kyle a blowjob, but they later realize who each other are, and Jack exclaims, "You don't have any money! Shit!" and then cuts to credits.
- Rock Star Sperm for Sale: At the beginning, Jack and Kyle are seen to be masturbating into a cup. Later on, they sell it, with a sign indicating "Rock Star Sperm for Sale!". A man comes over and offers to buy, but the D turn him down, claiming "It's only for the ladies". However, this man explains that he is a collector of rock star sperm, so they let him buy the sperm. Another man then buys it, but when asked if he too is a collector, he says "no" and drinks the sperm. When asked why he drank it, he says, "Its good for your throat. It helps you sing better, like Rod Stewart." Within two seconds of leaving the stall, the man passes out. Kyle wants to see if what the man claims is true, so he drinks a cup. Then it shows the inside of his throat, with sperm cells, with Jack and Kyle's faces on them, singing.
- Butt Baby: Jack and Kyle are in the middle of the desert, after taking LSD, naked apart from underwear. They want to create an LSD-inspired song, but before they can begin, Jack runs a few meters away, and starts tripping. At first, it is a good trip, but when Kyle calls his name, he becomes angry, claiming, "You cannot label my essence!". Kyle, thinking that they had some "bad LSD" checks the box of LSD. He finds that it isn't LSD at all, but rather a pregnancy test. He then claims that his test is positive, and goes into labour. Jack then delivers his baby, but it is unclear whether this is part of the trip or not.

==== Tenacious D documentaries ====
- Tenacious D in the Studio
- Tenacious D on the Road Documentary

==== Television appearances ====
- "MADtv"
- "Crank Yankers"
- "Late Night with Conan O'Brien"

==== Music videos ====
- "Tribute"
- "Making of Tribute"
- "Wonderboy"
- "Making of Wonderboy"
- "Fuck Her Gently"

== Promotion ==
In order to promote the discs, Black and Gass staged a press conference at the Millennium hotel to announce a hunger strike. The band intended to fast in a glass cage suspended above Times Square for 45 days, but in the end retired after 23 minutes.

In addition to this, prior to the DVD coming out, Tenacious D released Selections From The Double DVD The Complete Master Works Promo, which was sold in certain stores.

== Certifications ==
Region	Certification	Certified units/sales
Australia (ARIA)	2× Platinum	30,000^{^}
United Kingdom (BPI)	Platinum	50,000^{*}
United States (RIAA)	6× Platinum	600,000^{^}
^{*} Sales figures based on certification alone.^{^} Shipments figures based on certification alone.

== Trivia ==
Jack Black's original artwork under the pseudonym of Jackalous McBlackelby

In the second disc of the set, highlighting the "In The Studio" menu entry and pressing the LEFT arrow key on the remote control highlights a cactus. Pressing ENTER gives access to a TV commercial for The Osbournes.

Highlighting the menu entry called "TV Appearances" and pressing the RIGHT arrow key on the remote control highlights another cactus. It will give access to an alternate TV commercial for The Osbournes.

Highlighting the "Music Videos" menu entry and pressing the LEFT arrow key on the remote control, a skull will light up. Pressing ENTER will access a commercial for the Tenacious D album.

On the back of the DVD, a green guitar pick labeled "The Pick" can be seen, which holds a strong resemblance to the Pick of Destiny, the main prop in Tenacious D's feature film. Kyle Gass mentioned on the Guitarings Facebook page when asked that it was included at the time when the film was in prior production to being filmed. The concept had been thought of earlier in the year.

David Cross, who wrote the Tenacious D TV episodes, appears as a comic dressed as a nun in "Angel in Disguise".
