= The Complete Master Works 2 =

2008 video album by Tenacious D

Video by Tenacious D
- Released: November 4, 2008
- Recorded: Disc one: February 16 and 17, 2007 in Seattle, Washington
- Genres: Acoustic rock, comedy rock
- Label: Epic
- Director: Wayne Isham

Tenacious D chronology
The Complete Master Works (2003)	The Complete Master Works 2 (2008)	The Complete Master Works 3 (2025)

The Complete Master Works 2 is a video album by American comedy rock band Tenacious D. Released on November 4, 2008, it features footage from the band's performances at the Paramount Theatre in Seattle, Washington on February 16 and 17, 2007, during The Pick of Destiny Tour. The release also features numerous bonus videos and D Tour: A Tenacious Documentary. It is the successor to the band's previous collection The Complete Master Works.

A notable mistake on the DVD case states that the footage of the Seattle performances was recorded at the Moore Theatre. The band would go on to perform at the Moore Theatre over ten years later in December 2018, as part of their Post-Apocalypto Tour.

A sequel, The Complete Master Works 3, was announced in August 2025, and released on October 3, 2025.

== Track listing ==
=== Disc one ===
- Live concert
1. "Kielbasa"
2. "History"
3. "Wonderboy"
4. "Dio"
5. "Lee"
6. "Sax-A-Boom"
7. "The Road"
8. "Hell Movie Skit"
9. "Kickapoo"
10. "Karate"
11. "Dude (I Totally Miss You)"
12. "Kyle Quit the Band"
13. "Friendship"
14. "The Metal"
15. "Papagenu (He's My Sassafrass)"
16. "Master Exploder"
17. "Beelzeboss (The Final Showdown)"
18. "Double Team"
19. "Fuck Her Gently"
20. "Tribute"
21. "Who Medley"

=== Disc two ===
- D Tour: A Tenacious Documentary
- Bonus features
  - "Master Exploder" live on Late Night with Conan O'Brien
  - 2006 MTV Movie Awards performance
  - "The Metal" live on Saturday Night Live
  - Tenacious D: Time Fixers
  - "Classico" music video

== Personnel ==
Band

- Jack Black – lead vocals, rhythm acoustic guitar
- Kyle Gass – lead acoustic guitar, backing vocals
- John Konesky – electric guitar
- John Spiker – bass
- Brooks Wackerman – drums
- JR Reed - additional vocals

Production

- Wayne Isham – director
- Dana Marshall – producer
- Lukas Ettlin – director of photography
- Kevin McCullough – editor
- Brett Eliason – live audio recording
- Andrew Scheps – audio mixing
