= Rize of the Fenix =

Studio album by Tenacious D
- Released: May 11, 2012
- Recorded: 2011–12
- Studios: Ocean Way Recording (Los Angeles, California), Record One (Sherman Oaks, California), The Loft (Los Angeles), Perfect Sound Studios (Los Angeles), Ocean Studio (Burbank, California), Dave's Room (Los Angeles), Blacksound (Pasadena, California), Kimbrough's (Los Angeles), Studio 606 (Los Angeles), Capital Recording Studios (Los Angeles)
- Genres: Comedy rock, hard rock, acoustic rock
- Length: 41:16
- Label: Columbia
- Producers: John Kimbrough, John King

Tenacious D chronology
| The Pick of Destiny (2006) | Rize of the Fenix (2012) | Jazz (2012) |

Singles from Rize of the Fenix
- 1. "Rize of the Fenix" Released: March 27, 2012; 2. "Low Hanging Fruit" Released: May 17, 2012; 3. "Rock Is Dead" Released: May 30, 2012

Rize of the Fenix is the third studio album by American rock band Tenacious D. Produced by John Kimbrough, it was released in North America on May 15, 2012 by Columbia Records. The album was nominated for a Grammy Award for Best Comedy Album at the 2013 ceremony.

== Background and recording ==
In November 2006, Jack Black expressed a desire to take a year-long break from acting, though Kyle Gass hinted that he wanted Tenacious D to conclude while still at their current high point. However, Black confirmed that a third album would be recorded by announcing that a new song has been written for it entitled "Deth Starr". He said that the album would likely be released in 2010, but on other occasions he mentioned the year 2012. In early 2008, Black announced that the band was working on a new album. Gass later commented that only “one to one and a half” songs had been written so far, and that they hoped to write between twelve and fifteen.

Music magazine Billboard quoted Black as revealing that "We just laid down a hot [...] we're calling it the bomb track. It's a very powerful recording called "Deth Starr" [...] so it has nothing to do with the Star Wars [Death Star]," adding that "It's kind of sci-fi, doomsday rock." Black also stated on the Late Show with David Letterman that he had an idea for a song called "Rise of the Phoenix", which he described as a "rise from the ashes" workout song similar to "Eye of the Tiger". He performed a vocal sample of the song along to keyboards.

At one point, Gass hinted that the band's third album may be called Tenacious D 3-D, reasoning that "It's the third record, so it should probably be 'Tenacious 3-D.' There's going to be a '3' and a 'D,' so you have to connect them." Dave Grohl confirmed that he would appear as the drummer on the album, after performing on both Tenacious D and The Pick of Destiny. In an interview with Spinner.com in December 2010, Black revealed that the band was "about halfway through the writing process" for its new album, telling fans to expect the release of new material "at the end of 2011". In terms of lyrical themes for the new songs, Black noted that "We're gonna be talking about love, there are gonna be some songs about sex and there's gonna be songs about food".

In a May 2011 interview at Attack of the Show, Black announced that three songs on their upcoming album would be named "Rize of the Fenix", distinguishable by either letter or number. Also in the same interview, he named another song called "Señorita". John Konesky has estimated that the new album will come out "in spring 2012".

== Release and promotion ==
In February 2012, it was revealed that the title of the album would in fact be spelled Rize of the Fenix and was released on May 15, 2012. A music video for "To Be the Best" was released on The A.V. Club on March 26, 2012. It guest stars Maria Menounos, Tim Robbins, Val Kilmer, Jimmy Kimmel, Dave Grohl, Yoshiki, and Josh Groban. On April 18, 2012 a video was released on the Tenacious D YouTube channel titled 'Where Have We Been'. The iTunes pre-order bonus track "5 Needs" was originally performed by Tenacious D in their cameo in the 1996 film Bio-Dome. The band released the album without bonus tracks on April 28, 2012 on their SoundCloud account, to counteract the leaking of the music video for "Rize of the Fenix". The video was also released for free on May 1 on iTunes. Prior to the album's release, the duo appeared on the Nerdist Podcast, episode 194; they played "To Be the Best" and "Roadie" from the album, as well as "Double Team" from their first album and the Star Trek theme, a staple of their live shows. The next Tenacious D music video was for "Roadie", released on May 8 via Funny or Die. The video featured Danny McBride as the Roadie. The band exclusively released a track-by-track commentary of the album on Spotify. The fourth music video to be released was for "Low Hangin' Fruit" on May 17, 2012.

In early 2020, as a part of virtual comedy festival COVID is No Joke, the band released a performance video for the song "5 Needs" for free.

== Reception ==
In December 2012, the album was nominated for a Grammy Award for Best Comedy Album.

Professional ratings
Aggregate scores
| Source | Rating |
|---|---|
| Metacritic | 64/100 |
Review scores
| Source | Rating |
| AllMusic | 4/5 stars |
| Alternative Press | 3/5 stars |
| The A.V. Club | B+ |
| Consequence of Sound | 3/5 stars |
| Kerrang! | 4/5 stars |
| Paste | 8.3/10 |
| PopMatters | 2/10 |
| Rock Sound | 7/10 |
| Rolling Stone | 2/5 stars |
| Spin | 6/10 |

=== Commercial performance ===
On 16 May 2012, The Official Charts Company in the UK reported in a mid-week chart update that the album took an early lead over the previous week's No. 1, Keane's Strangeland, which fell to No. 2. However, by the end of the week, Keane's album overtook them and Rize of the Fenix debuted at No. 2 in the top 40 UK Albums Chart with under 16,000 sales. Yet, the album topped the UK Rock Chart and UK Download Chart. The album also debuted at No. 10 in the UK Record Store Top 40 Chart.

On 18 May 2012, in a mid-week chart update in the US, the Billboard reported that Rize of the Fenix stood at No. 3 with an estimated 40,000 to 50,000 units shifted, only behind Adam Lambert's Trespassing and Adele's 21 respectively, according to Nielsen SoundScan. However, it was officially announced that the album debuted at No. 4 on the charts and sold 49,000 units.

The album is the highest-selling comedy album of 2012 selling 113,000 copies in the US.

=== Critical response ===
Upon its release, Rize of the Fenix received generally favorable reviews from music critics with an aggregate score of 64/100 on Metacritic, based on thirteen reviews.

Mark Harris of Upstart Magazine commended the production quality, saying it was "the most tightly composed material the duo has ever created". Harris pointed out that the duo's maturity as performers was showing, noting that although it made their material less crass, it allowed them to stray from being a "one punchline joke". Callum Thomson of Hit The Floor magazine gave the album a 9/10 and said that "it’s everything you should expect from these two masters of comedic music by now". Steven Hyden from The A.V. Club gave the album a B+ and concluded with "No joke: Rize of the Fenix is one of the year's most enjoyable hard-rock records." As of May, the grade by readers is B. Stephen Thomas Erlewine of Allmusic gave a score of 4 out of 5 stars and said "Rize of the Fenix does amount to a rousing comeback for Tenacious D: they're back to their old tricks, oblivious to whether the world at large actually cares about their shenanigans". Ryan Reed from Paste magazine gave the album an 8.3/10 and praised a number of songs, such as the title song for being "so powerful, so perfect, so representative of what these guys do well" and "The Ballad of Hollywood Jack and the Rage Kage" for being "another classic" which "could be taken at face-value as a legitimate betrayal-redemption story", although mentioning that the writing style for the other songs "seems to suggest the assistance of a computer-based Rock Generator, with tunes that feel more like templates".

Kerrang magazine gave it 8/10 and said "Tenacious D are back. They're funny, they're absurd and they're hotter than a phoenix". Times-Standard wrote a favorable review by saying "The album is worth the money for those who are not easily offended. While their destiny for fame as the world's best comedy-rockers seemed picked off by their sophomore LP, “Rize to the Fenix" soars sky high. The D is indeed back." Likewise, Seattle Post-Intelligencer gave another favorable review and eventually said "Regardless of what the future holds, Rize of the Fenix is a splendid addition to their small but potent discography". Halie Williams from The Lantern magazine gave it a B+ and went to say that "as a true fan of its self-titled album and 2006 album and film "Pick of Destiny," I wouldn't say this is its best work, but it's certainly a humorous listen". Both the Rock-Regeneration website and The Morton Report gave the album very favorable reviews with Rock-Generation explaining that "some will say that this album was the final straw for Tenacious D", although "this is only the beginning of a new chapter for them", and with Chaz Lipp from The Morton Report that "after a six-year break, JB and KG return to rock your socks off" and that "Rize of the Fenix will make a great soundtrack for the summer of 2012". Chazz also went to say that "the D wield a similar type of power, and just like the Marx Brothers they may not be for everyone". Moreover, Christina Benneworth of Backstagepass.biz gave a similar favorable review by saying "A good come back for Tenacious D" with "comical lyrics and amazing music". The Northern Echo newspaper gave a score of 4 out 5 stars and said that "fans will love [the album] here". Zach Redrup of Dead Press gave a rating of 8 out of 10 stars and said "Tenacious D are still the band who once wrote the best song in the world, forgot about it, and remembered it again when confronting Satan himself".

Toro magazine gave a score of 3.5 out of 5 stars and said "Like The D's best work of yore, it should earn spins well after the laughs have worn off". The AM New York magazine gave it 3 out of 5 stars and called "The Ballad of Hollywood Jack and the Rage Kage" song as "the finest self-referential ballad since the Beatles' "The Ballad of John and Yoko". Scott Heisel of Alternative Press gave it 3 out of 5 stars as well by concluding that "'Fenix' is loaded with classic-rock-aping material which simultaneously admires and lampoons everything from Star Wars ("Deth Starr") to organized religion ("Throwdown")", but "the humor practiced by Black and cohort Kyle Gass hasn't evolved much since [2006's Pick Of Destiny]". Moreover, Consequence of Sound gave a score of 3 out of 5 stars and said that "Rize of the Fenix proves that Tenacious D still reign supreme. But maybe only burrito or chicken supreme and not quite Cutlass Supreme this time out". Similarly, Culture Tease gave it a 6/10 by saying that the album "has brief hints of pure pop/rock perfection, sat uncomfortably between driveling songs that never quite stick" and that they have "improved dramatically here from their previous efforts", but "the D is really only successful in sporadic bursts, and even over 40 minutes their [sic] just tiresome as hell." As well, Spin magazine gave it 6/10 and said "The satire is worn thin in the Rock of Ages era, but duo still slays the Darkness' harmonies.". Blurt gave an identical score of 6/10 and went to say "Yet another viciously fun balls-out rocker of an album". Rob Sayce of Rock Sound gave it a 7/10 by saying "If you hated their previous works this won't change your mind, but ‘Rize...’ should satisfy fans, providing guilty chuckles by the truckload". Alan Shulman of No Ripcord gave it a 7/10 and explained that "All in all, it delivers the chuckles and a few guffaws, even if they are hitting up against the law of diminishing returns".

Maura Johnstone from Rolling Stone gave the album 2 out of 5 stars and viewed it as "so bombastic you wonder if Black and Gass have finally turned into the overblown wanksters they parody" and reproached that "too many of its gags sound like they've been festering since the Pick of Destiny days". On the other hand, the readers gave it an aggregated score of 4 out of 5 stars. August Brown from the Los Angeles Times gave it 2.5 out of 5 stars and saying "When sincere rock music is DOA on the charts, is it too late to wonder whether the D is the genre’s last true defender?". Dominic Hemy from The Digital Fix called the album "the same old joke that no one else is laughing at any more; once was quite funny, second time around wearing a little thin". He also went to say that "Tenacious D are a waste of space that have long since lost any appeal" and ultimately gave the album a 3/10. Kirk Baird of Las Vegas Weekly gave an unfavorable review by saying "Rize of the Fenix plays like warmed-over D, far from 2001's brilliant self-titled debut.". Thomas Britt from Pop Matters gave the lowest review with a score of 2/10 by saying "Rize of the Fenix reveals a Tenacious D that has fallen behind its musical peers" and "in fact, the most frustrating thing about Rize of the Fenix is that it pretends Tenacious D's previous release (2008's The Complete Master Works 2 DVD) doesn't exist".

== Track listing ==
All tracks are written by Jack Black and Kyle Gass, except where noted.

| No. | Title | Writer(s) | Length |
|---|---|---|---|
| 1. | "Rize of the Fenix" | Black; Gass; John Kimbrough | 5:53 |
| 2. | "Low Hangin' Fruit" | | 2:31 |
| 3. | "Classical Teacher" (Skit) | Black; Gass; J. D. Ryznar | 3:23 |
| 4. | "Señorita" | Black; Gass; Kimbrough | 3:08 |
| 5. | "Deth Starr" | | 4:46 |
| 6. | "Roadie" | | 2:58 |
| 7. | "Flutes & Trombones" (Skit) | Black; Gass; Bob Odenkirk | 1:28 |
| 8. | "The Ballad of Hollywood Jack and the Rage Kage" | | 5:05 |
| 9. | "Throw Down" | | 2:56 |
| 10. | "Rock Is Dead" | | 1:44 |
| 11. | "They Fucked Our Asses" | | 1:08 |
| 12. | "To Be the Best" | | 1:00 |
| 13. | "39" | | 5:16 |
| Total length: | | | 41:16 |

iTunes pre-order bonus track
| No. | Title | Length |
|---|---|---|
| 14. | "5 Needs" | 1:36 |

Deluxe edition bonus tracks
| No. | Title | Length |
|---|---|---|
| 14. | "Quantum Leap" | 3:50 |
| 15. | "Rivers of Brown" | 1:23 |

Deluxe edition bonus DVD
| No. | Title | Director | Length |
|---|---|---|---|
| 1. | "Low Hangin' Fruit" | Liam Lynch | 2:32 |
| 2. | "Where Have We Been" | Lynch | 1:30 |
| 3. | "Tale of the Fenix" | Lynch | 1:51 |
| 4. | "Rock Is Dead" | Lynch | 1:42 |
| 5. | "Roadie" | Jody Hill | 7:06 |
| 6. | "Rize of the Fenix" (exclusive to EMP version) | Daniel Scheinert; Daniel Kwan | 3:59 |
| Total length: | | | 14:41 |

== Personnel ==
- Jack Black – vocals, acoustic guitar ("Rize of the Fenix", "Deth Starr" and "They Fucked Our Asses")
- Kyle Gass – acoustic guitar, backing vocals ("Rize of the Fenix", "Low Hangin' Fruit", "Deth Starr", "Roadie", "Quantum Leap" and "Rivers of Brown"), percussion ("Señorita"), flute ("Flutes & Trombones"), recorder ("The Ballad of Hollywood Jack and the Rage Kage")
- Dave Grohl – drums (all songs except for "The Ballad of Hollywood Jack and the Rage Kage" and "They Fucked Our Asses")
- John Konesky – electric guitar, classical guitar ("Señorita"), lap steel guitar ("Deth Starr")
- John Spiker – bass, piano ("Rize of the Fenix", "Roadie", "The Ballad of Hollywood Jack and the Rage Kage" and "39"), organ ("Rize of the Fenix" and "39"), percussion ("Señorita"), vocals ("Quantum Leap"), celeste ("Rivers of Brown"), programming ("Rize of the Fenix", "Señorita", "Roadie", "The Ballad of Hollywood Jack and the Rage Kage", "They Fucked Our Asses", "To Be the Best", "Quantum Leap" and "Rivers of Brown"), string arrangements ("Roadie", "The Ballad of Hollywood Jack and the Rage Kage", "They Fucked Our Asses" and "Rivers of Brown"), horn arrangements ("Rize of the Fenix"), engineering and mixing (all tracks)
- Scott Seiver – percussion ("Low Hangin' Fruit", "Señorita", "The Ballad of Hollywood Jack and the Rage Kage", "39" and "Quantum Leap"), drums ("The Ballad of Hollywood Jack and the Rage Kage" and "They Fucked Our Asses")
- Jon Brion – bass, synthesizers and mellotron ("The Ballad of Hollywood Jack and the Rage Kage")
- Chris Bautista – trumpet ("Señorita")
- Page McConnell – synthesizers ("Deth Starr")
- Andrew Gross – string arrangements ("Roadie")
- Mike Hoy – trombone ("Flutes & Trombones")
- Christopher Wray – lap steel guitar ("39")
- John Kimbrough – production (all tracks except "Deth Starr"), acoustic guitar ("Señorita" and "The Ballad of Hollywood Jack and the Rage Kage"), synthesizers ("Throw Down" and "Rock Is Dead"), mellotron ("Señorita"), programming ("Señorita" and "The Ballad of Hollywood Jack and the Rage Kage"), horn arrangements ("Rize of the Fenix"), string arrangements ("Roadie")
- John King – production ("Deth Starr")
- Josh Wilbur – engineering
- Andrew Clark – engineering assistance
- Bob Ludwig – mastering
- James Krewson – artwork

== Charts ==
=== Weekly charts ===
| Chart (2012) | Peak position |
|---|---|
| Australian Albums (ARIA) | 6 |
| Austrian Albums (Ö3 Austria) | 2 |
| Belgian Albums (Ultratop Flanders) | 68 |
| Canadian Albums (Billboard) | 7 |
| Danish Albums (Hitlisten) | 11 |
| Dutch Albums (Album Top 100) | 16 |
| Finnish Albums (Suomen virallinen lista) | 35 |
| German Albums (Offizielle Top 100) | 5 |
| Irish Albums (IRMA) | 4 |
| New Zealand Albums (RMNZ) | 11 |
| Scottish Albums (Official Charts) | 2 |
| Swedish Albums (Sverigetopplistan) | 15 |
| Swiss Albums (Schweizer Hitparade) | 4 |
| UK Albums (Official Charts) | 2 |
| UK Rock & Metal Albums (Official Charts) | 1 |
| US Billboard 200 | 4 |
| US Top Comedy Albums (Billboard) | 1 |
| US Top Hard Rock Albums (Billboard) | 2 |
| US Top Rock Albums (Billboard) | 1 |

=== Year-end charts ===
| Chart (2012) | Position |
|---|---|
| US Top Rock Albums (Billboard) | 67 |

== Certifications ==
| Region | Certification | Certified units/sales |
|---|---|---|
| United Kingdom (BPI) | Silver | 60,000^{‡} |
^{‡} Sales+streaming figures based on certification alone.

== Release history ==
Physical releases

| Region | Date | Label | Format | Catalog | Ref. |
|---|---|---|---|---|---|
| Germany | May 11, 2012 | Sony Music | Compact Disc | | |
| Germany | May 11, 2012 | Sony Music | LP record | | |
| United Kingdom | May 14, 2012 | Columbia Records | Compact Disc | 88691952322 | |
| United States | May 15, 2012 | Columbia Records | Compact Disc | | |
| United States | May 15, 2012 | Columbia Records | LP record | | |
| Japan | May 23, 2012 | Sony Music | Compact Disc | SICP3490 | |

Digital releases

| Region | Date | Label | Ref. | Notes |
|---|---|---|---|---|
| Australia | May 11, 2012 | Columbia Records | | Explicit version |
| Australia | May 11, 2012 | Columbia Records | | Clean version |
| Austria | May 11, 2012 | Columbia Records | | Explicit version |
| Germany | May 11, 2012 | Columbia Records | | Explicit version |
| Norway | May 11, 2012 | Columbia Records | | Explicit version |
| Switzerland | May 11, 2012 | Columbia Records | | Explicit version |
| United Kingdom | May 14, 2012 | Columbia Records | | Explicit version |
| United Kingdom | May 14, 2012 | Columbia Records | | Clean version |
| Denmark | May 14, 2012 | Columbia Records | | Explicit version |
| France | May 14, 2012 | Columbia Records | | Explicit version |
| Greece | May 14, 2012 | Columbia Records | | Explicit version |
| New Zealand | May 14, 2012 | Columbia Records | | Explicit version |
| New Zealand | May 14, 2012 | Columbia Records | | Clean version |
| Portugal | May 14, 2012 | Columbia Records | | Explicit version |
| Sweden | May 14, 2012 | Columbia Records | | Explicit version |

| Region | Date | Label | Ref. | Notes |
|---|---|---|---|---|
| Italy | May 15, 2012 | Columbia Records | | Explicit version |
| Mexico | May 15, 2012 | Columbia Records | | Explicit version |
| Mexico | May 15, 2012 | Columbia Records | | Clean version |
| Netherlands | May 15, 2012 | Columbia Records | | Explicit version |
| Netherlands | May 15, 2012 | Columbia Records | | Clean version |
| Poland | May 15, 2012 | Columbia Records | | Explicit version |
| Poland | May 15, 2012 | Columbia Records | | Clean version |
| Spain | May 15, 2012 | Columbia Records | | Explicit version |
| United States | May 15, 2012 | Columbia Records | | Explicit version |
| United States | May 15, 2012 | Columbia Records | | Clean version |
