= The Complete Master Works 3 =

2025 video album by Tenacious D

Video by Tenacious D
- Released: October 3, 2025
- Recorded: June 16, 2023
- Venue: The O2 Arena
- Genre: Acoustic rock, comedy rock

Tenacious D chronology
The Complete Master Works 2 (2008)	The Complete Master Works 3 (2025)

The Complete Master Works 3 is a video album by American comedy rock band Tenacious D. Released on October 3, 2025. It is the successor to the band's previous collections The Complete Master Works and The Complete Master Works 2. It includes a live concert from The O2 Arena on The Spicy Meatball Tour in 2023, as well as the release of Tenacious D in Post-Apocalypto and music videos.

== Track listing ==
=== Concert ===
1. Overture
2. Kickapoo
3. Low Hangin’ Fruit
4. Rize of the Fenix
5. Wonderboy
6. Tribute
7. Video Games
8. The Metal
9. Sax-a-Boom / Max-a-Boom
10. Roadie
11. Dude (I Totally Miss You)
12. Beelzeboss (The Final Showdown)
13. Double Team
14. Master Exploder
15. The Spicy Meatball Theme Song
16. Fuck Her Gently

Featurettes:

- Tenacious D in Post-Apocalypto (full series)
- ...Baby One More Time (music video)
- The Who Medley (music video)
- You Never Give Me Your Money / The End (music video)
- Wicked Game (music video)
- Video Games (music video)
- Fiber D'Lish (commercial)

== Personnel ==
- Jack Black – lead vocals, rhythm acoustic guitar
- Kyle Gass – lead acoustic guitar, backing vocals
- John Konesky – electric guitar
- John Spiker – bass
- Scott Seiver – drums
