= Tenacious D in Post-Apocalypto =

2018 American animated web series

- Created by: Jack Black; Kyle Gass
- Directed by: Jack Black; Kyle Gass
- Starring: Jack Black; Kyle Gass
- Country of origin: United States
- Original language: English
- No. of episodes: 6

Production
- Executive producers: Jack Black; Kyle Gass

Original release
- Network: YouTube
- Release: September 28 – November 2, 2018

Tenacious D in Post-Apocalypto is an American animatic series by Jack Black and Kyle Gass as Tenacious D, released independently through the band's YouTube channel. The soundtrack for the series was released as the band's fourth studio album, Post-Apocalypto, by Columbia Records. The stills from the series were used to create a graphic novel released by Fantagraphics Books in September 2020.

All six episodes of the series are included on The Complete Master Works 3 (2025), a DVD and Blu-ray release, including a director's edit extension with previously unseen footage.

== Production ==
In June 2012 when asked about a sequel to Tenacious D in The Pick of Destiny, Black stated that the band had "found a loophole with the internet and animated shorts. That's the world we're looking to dive into, and not just for money, mainly for art." The band would mention later on in that year that they may make an Internet series "exclusive to YouTube." The project was a fantasy for Black and Gass for a few years, until the Donald Trump presidential campaign inspired them to start writing a post-apocalyptic comedy in 2016.

The project was assembled by Black physically drawing each frame with markers and notepads, with longtime Tenacious D bassist and producer John Spiker scanning and digitalizing the images. Michael Molina would add color later on in the process.

In December 2017, whilst on Kerrang Radio promoting Jumanji: Welcome to the Jungle, Black stated that the title of the animated series would be called Tenacious D in Post-Apocalypto.

Black and Gass pitched the series to Netflix, HBO Go and Amazon Prime Video for distribution, but it was rejected. The series was ultimately released on YouTube, and revenue came mainly from the accompanying album.

== Release ==
On May 6, 2018, during Tenacious D's performance at the Shaky Knees Music Festival, Black asked the audience if anyone had seen The Pick of Destiny, and that "part two is coming out in October. I don't know where you'll be able to see it, but we've decided it's happening and it's coming out. Rocktober".

On May 15, 2018, the band updated their website and social media platforms with drawings from the series, as well as announcing a 2018 fall US tour through a tour trailer, and releasing new merchandise. On September 4, it was announced that the series would be released on YouTube, with the first episode coming out on September 28. A new episode was released every Friday from then until November 2, to mark the release of the Post-Apocalypto album and the subsequent tour.

The series was screened at the LA Film Festival on September 24, the Fantastic Fest on September 25, the L.A. Comic Con on October 26, across the Alamo Drafthouse Cinema chain on November 2 and at the Prince Charles Cinema in London on May 31, 2019. It was praised for its commentary on toxic-masculinity and toxic-feminism, comedy, and music.

The second episode was removed from YouTube shortly after being uploaded on October 5 for its sexual content. It was reinstated and had an age-restriction placed on it shortly after.

On November 8, 2018, all of the episodes were uploaded as one video branded "full movie" which, as of February 2024, has since been removed from YouTube for violating their policy on nudity or sexual content.

The series was partially screened as part of the band's Post-Apocalypto Tour, which commenced on November 3, 2018, at the Kings Theatre in Brooklyn, and finished on February 26, 2020, at the Zénith Paris.

=== Legacy ===
In February 2020, whilst on tour in Europe, it was announced that the book would be released in September 2020 as a book by Fantagraphics Books. In September 2020, the band worked alongside American independent comic stores in a virtual book signing with proceeds going to select independent stores.

On April 16, 2021, the band announced a special series of artwork from the series for purchase as non-fungible token, via Makersplace.com.

In June 2022, the band released a series of NuGo Nutrition Bars in a limited edition box with artwork from the series and branded 'Fiber D'Lish'.

== Episodes ==
| No. | Title | Directed by | Original release date |
|---|---|---|---|
| 1 | "Hope" | Black and Gass | September 28, 2018 |
Black and Gass are living life normally until a hydrogen bomb is dropped from an airplane. The duo manage to survive the blast, and meet a two-headed dog, who Black names "Hope". Songs played: "Post-Apocalypto Theme"; "Hope"; "Post-Apocalypto Theme (Reprise)"

| No. | Title | Directed by | Original release date |
|---|---|---|---|
| 2 | "Cave" | Black and Gass | October 5, 2018 |
Black and Gass explore the new world, and are saved from thirst by cave women with whom they have a sexual encounter. Songs played: "Post-Apocalypto Theme"; "Making Love"; "Post-Apocalypto Theme (Reprise)"

| No. | Title | Directed by | Original release date |
|---|---|---|---|
| 3 | "Space" | Black and Gass | October 12, 2018 |
Black and Gass continue to venture into the desert on their motorcycle, when they come across scientists who have taken some other survivors into space. Songs played: "Post-Apocalypto Theme"; "Take Us Into Space"; "F**k Yo Yo Ma" (instrumental); "Post-Apocalypto Theme (Reprise)"

| No. | Title | Directed by | Original release date |
|---|---|---|---|
| 4 | "Robot" | Black and Gass | October 19, 2018 |
Black and Gass are attacked by a huge monster and are saved by a mysterious robot sent from the future. Songs played: "Post-Apocalypto Theme"; "Daddy Ding Dong"; "Robot"; "Post-Apocalypto Theme (Reprise)"

| No. | Title | Directed by | Original release date |
|---|---|---|---|
| 5 | "Donald" | Black and Gass | October 25, 2018 |
Black and Gass travel to the White House in order to obtain the crystal of Gilgamesh, and face a narcissistic tyrant named Donald, Jr. Songs played: "Post-Apocalypto Theme"; "marCH"; "Colors"; "Post-Apocalypto Theme (Reprise)"

| No. | Title | Directed by | Original release date |
|---|---|---|---|
| 6 | "Home" | Black and Gass | November 2, 2018 |
Black and Gass make their way to Egypt to return the crystal of Gilgamesh. Songs played: "Post-Apocalypto Theme"; "JB Jr Rap"; "Woman Time"; "Post-Apocalypto Theme (Reprise)"
