= Post-Apocalypto =

Studio album by Tenacious D
- Released: November 2, 2018
- Genres: Comedy rock; heavy metal; rock opera; acoustic rock; hard rock
- Length: 30:38
- Label: Columbia
- Producer: John Spiker

Tenacious D chronology
Tenacious D Live (2015)	Post-Apocalypto (2018)

Post-Apocalypto is the fourth studio album by American rock band Tenacious D. Their last album released before they went on indefinite hiatus in July of 2024.Produced by bassist John Spiker, it was released in North America on November 2, 2018, by Columbia Records. The album features songs and audio snippets from the band’s animated web series Tenacious D in Post-Apocalypto.

== Background ==
In June 2012, when asked about a sequel to Tenacious D in The Pick of Destiny, Black stated that the band had "found a loophole with the Internet and animated shorts. That's the world we're looking to dive into, and not just for money, mainly for art." The band mentioned later on in that year that they were considering making an Internet series "exclusive to YouTube". The project was a fantasy for Black and Gass for a few years, until Donald Trump's 2016 presidential campaign inspired them to write a pilot episode set in the post-apocalypse. The remaining episodes would be completed between 2017 and 2018.

== Release and promotion ==
Professional ratings
Review scores
Source	Rating
AllMusic	2/5 stars
Consequence of Sound	C−
The Independent	2/5 stars
Sputnikmusic	1.5/5 stars

The band filmed a teaser for their Facebook page of them in the studio in May 2016. In December 2017, whilst on Kerrang Radio promoting Jumanji: Welcome to the Jungle, Black stated that the title of a new animated series would be called Tenacious D in Post-Apocalypto.

In May 2018, the band entered and left the stage of Hell & Heaven Metal Fest in Mexico City to recordings of "Post-Apocalypto Theme" and "Post-Apocalypto Theme (Reprise)" - this being the world reveal of these tracks. A few days later, the band uploaded a tour trailer to their website and social media, also teasing a new album.

== Track listing ==
All tracks are written by Jack Black and Kyle Gass.

No.	Title	Length
1.	"Post-Apocalypto Theme"	0:37
2.	"Desolation"	1:17
3.	"Hope"	1:59
4.	"Cave Women"	1:26
5.	"Making Love"	2:56
6.	"Scientists"	1:17
7.	"Take Us Into Space"	1:56
8.	"I've Got to Go"	1:50
9.	"Fuck Yo-Yo Ma"	1:34
10.	"Reunion/Not So Fast"	1:08
11.	"Daddy Ding Dong"	1:45
12.	"Chainsaw Bazooka Machine Gun"	1:00
13.	"Robot"	2:26
14.	"March"	1:23
15.	"Turd Whistle"	0:39
16.	"Colors"	2:20
17.	"Who's Your Daddy?"	0:48
18.	"JB Jr Rap"	1:31
19.	"Woman Time"	1:23
20.	"Save the World"	0:44
21.	"Post-Apocalypto Theme (Reprise)"	0:39
Total length:		30:38

Notes

- Tracks 1, 3, 5, 7, 9, 11, 13, 16, 18, 19, 20 and 21 are stylized in uppercase. For example, "Post-Apocalypto Theme" is written as "POST-APOCALYPTO THEME".
- Tracks 2, 4, 6, 8, 10, 12, 15 and 17 are stylized in lowercase. For example, "Desolation" is written as "desolation".
- Track 14 is stylized as "marCH".

== Personnel ==
Official members

- Jack Black – lead vocals, acoustic guitar
- Kyle Gass – acoustic guitar, backing vocals, recorder

Additional members

- Dave Grohl – drums
- John Konesky – electric guitar
- John Spiker – bass guitar, keyboards
- Scott Seiver – percussion, piano

Orchestra

- Drew Taubenfeld – steel guitar
- Paul Cartwright – strings
- Mona Tian – strings
- Molly Rogers – strings
- Derek Stein – strings

Technical

- John Spiker – producer, mixing engineer
- Matt Wolach – assistant engineer
- Bo Bodnar – assistant engineer
- Will Borza – assistant engineer
- Howie Weinberg – mastering

== Charts ==
Chart (2018)	Peak position
Australian Albums (ARIA)	59
Austrian Albums (Ö3 Austria)	19
Belgian Albums (Ultratop Flanders)	101
German Albums (Offizielle Top 100)	30
Scottish Albums (Official Charts)	34
Swiss Albums (Schweizer Hitparade)	21
UK Albums (Official Charts)	47
US Billboard 200	93
