= Jazz (Tenacious D EP) =

EP by Tenacious D
- Released: November 23, 2012
- Genres: Jazz, comedy
- Length: 12:24
- Label: Columbia

Tenacious D chronology
| Rize of the Fenix (2012) | Jazz (2012) | Tenacious D Live (2015) |

Jazz is the second extended play by American comedy rock band Tenacious D. Released in 2012, the EP consists of a single eleven-minute jazz composition with vocals. The EP was released as a digital download and a limited edition vinyl record.

== Background ==
In October 2012, Jack Black announced that Tenacious D would record a jazz album, saying that it would "contain lyrics, but still channel Thelonious Monk, Miles Davis and other instrument-based jazz influences." In 2014, Jack Black recalled that he played the recording for jazz double bass player Charlie Haden and Haden walked out of the room shortly after it began.

== Release ==
In October 2012, Tenacious D performed "Simply Jazz" live in concert prior to the EP's release. On November 5, Tenacious D appeared on The Late Late Show With Craig Ferguson, performing "Simply Jazz" in promotion of the EP. The EP was released as a limited edition vinyl record as part of a Record Store Day promotion at participating stores. It is available as a digital EP on iTunes, which includes a bonus video, "The Making of Simply Jazz". The limited edition vinyl record contained a download card for the "making of" video.

== Track listing ==
Side A
| No. | Title | Length |
|---|---|---|
| 1. | "Simply Jazz" | 11:27 |

Side B
| No. | Title | Length |
|---|---|---|
| 2. | "Nothing On Side B" | 0:57 |
| Total length: | | 12:24 |

== Personnel ==
- John Spiker - bass, jazz
- Brooks Wackerman - drums, jazz
- John Konesky - guitar, jazz
- Kyle Gass - recorder, jazz
- Jack Black - vocals, jazz
