= Alfredo Ortiz =

American drummer

- Alfredo Ortiz with the Beastie Boys in Stradbally, Ireland on September 1, 2007.

Background information
- Also known as: Fredo Ortiz
- Origin: United States
- Genres: punk rock, indie rock, alternative rock, experimental rock, hip hop, latin jazz, ska, salsa,
- Occupation: Musician
- Instruments: Drums, Percussion, Latin Percussion, Beat Box, Guitar, Bass, Keyboard,Taiko
- Years active: 32
- Label: El Bomber Records
- Website: http://fredoortiz.com

Alfredo Ortiz (born September 7, 1975) is an American musician, primarily a drummer and percussionist. He toured with the Beastie Boys as their drummer and percussionist from 1996 until their final show in 2009. He also appeared in their live concert film, Awesome; I Fuckin' Shot That!, and was featured in their Grammy Award-winning instrumental album, The Mix-Up. Alfredo has been the drummer for other artists such as Money Mark, New York group Morningwood, Los Angeles rockers Red Exiles, and Tito & Tarantula.

Ortiz has worked with other bands and musicians including Money Mark, Kathleen Hanna, Los Lobos, The Offspring, Yeska, Ozomatli, BS 2000, Blackalicious, Los Villains, Tommy Guerrero, Mariachi El Bronx, Chromeo, Kelis, Sepultura, Gogol Bordello, Jack White, and Salvador Santana. Ortiz appears on Tenacious D's self titled album, released in 2001. From 2008 to 2010, he toured with Tito & Tarantula. He has also played with former Mars Volta's bassist Eva Gardner in her band called Lyra.

Ortiz appeared in the film Along Came Polly starring Ben Stiller and Jennifer Aniston in 2004. The original music used for that scene was written by Money Mark, and Fredo contributed his percussion to the recording as well. Ortiz's percussion, as well as a guest appearance, was featured in the 200th episode of CSI: Las Vegas, alongside Eric Bobo (Cypress Hill) and directed by the Academy Award-winning director of The Exorcist, William Friedkin.

In 2011, Ortiz founded his first solo project called Bongoloidz and completed the debut Bongoloidz album in early 2014.

In 2012 he joined the electro-funk project Maximum Hedrum with DJ/Producer Sam Spiegel and Derrick Green (of Sepultura).

In 2021 he joined Los Lobos, playing drums/percussion in their live band.
