= Fuck Her Gently =

Song performed by Tenacious D

- Promo CD for "Fuck Her Gently"

Promotional single by Tenacious D

from the album Tenacious D
- Released: August 18, 2001
- Studio: The Boat, Silverlake, California
- Genre: Acoustic rock, soft rock, comedy rock
- Length: 2:03
- Label: Epic
- Songwriters: Jack Black, Kyle Gass
- Producer: The Dust Brothers

Audio sample
- file; help

"Fuck Her Gently" is a 2001 Tenacious D song. It is the sixth track on their self-titled album.

== Synopsis ==
The vulgarity of the lyrics is contrasted by the low-key acoustic ballad style of the song. The singer contends that he is speaking "for the ladies", but advises men to listen closely. The theme of the song is essentially that women sometimes need to have their needs attended through gentle, romantic sexual encounters. The refrain contains variations of this sentiment:

I'm gonna fuck you... softly
I'm gonna screw you... gently
I'm gonna hump you... sweetly
I'm gonna ball you... discreetly

During the song, the singer demonstrates his sensitivity by suggesting that he would bring flowers and explaining his need for a relationship involving teamwork. He then offers to engage in the woman's favorite sexual position and inquires about the woman's favorite food, conceding that, although he will not cook the dish himself, he will certainly order it instead from Zanzibar.

At the end of the song, having recounted in numerous ways how he will pleasure his partner with gentle sex, the singer closes by declaring, "But then I'm gonna fuck you... hard!"

== Music video ==
Black in the "Fuck Her Gently" video.

Black viewed John Kricfalusi's website and, after watching The Ren & Stimpy Show, decided to ask him to produce the video. The total costs amounted to $40,000. The video was animated by John Kricfalusi's studio Spümcø. Gabe Swarr directed and co-wrote the video. Ben Jones was the layout artist and Derrick Wyatt designed the characters. It features cartoon versions of band members Jack Black and Kyle Gass as nude cherubim sent from Heaven to teach the Devil, who'd been having frantic sex with a female devil, to be loving in his relations with women. While at first concisely taking notes, Devil becomes enraged when he realizes that the cherubim are now pleasuring the she-devil instead, and moves to attack them.

It's a public service announcement, we’re saying, ‘Don't always slam genitalia as hard as you can.’ I've seen pornos where the guys are ramming away, and the girls are pretending to enjoy it because they're getting paid. That’s a bad message being sent to kids watching those pornos. And this is our way of counteracting it.

— Jack Black on the music video for "Fuck Her Gently".

Before he can accomplish this, the cherubim and the ecstatic female float out of his reach, rising to Heaven. When Heaven comes into view, a being appearing to be God appears; this is the same person as the record store attendant known as Captain Ed in "Death of the Dream", an episode of Tenacious D television series. The light of Heaven disintegrates the Devil, and the video ends with a static "The End" card, showing the cherubim with the she-devil, now an angel, albeit no more discreetly dressed than she was to begin with. The video was made in Adobe Flash.

Initially, Sony Music did not allow the video to be placed on Tenacious D's website and instead it was placed on the website of The Beastie Boys owned record label Grand Royal but Sony later relented and then allowed three different formats to be made publicly available, the original uncensored Flash version which could be viewed on the Tenacious D website but was not downloadable, an .exe version which when clicked opened into a self-executing Flash Player which was also uncensored and downloadable, and a Windows and RealPlayer versions which were censored but downloadable albeit in a lower quality. In preparation for the release of the band's The Complete Master Works, Sony removed all of Tenacious D's music and videos from the site, including "Fuck Her Gently", opting instead to make such media available through iTunes and other pay services. For a brief period of time Kricfalusi had showcased the video prominently on his company's website, Spumco.com, with Black and Gass' blessing; however, it was later removed after Sony objected to the video being hosted on a website that was outside of their control.

== Personnel ==
- Jack Black – lead vocals, acoustic guitar
- Kyle Gass – backing vocals, acoustic guitar
- Andrew Gross – strings

== Certifications ==
Certifications for "Fuck Her Gently"
Region	Certification	Certified units/sales
United Kingdom (BPI)	Silver	200,000^{‡}
^{‡} Sales+streaming figures based on certification alone.
