= Tenacious D (TV series) =

American television series

- Title card
- Created by: Jack Black; David Cross; Kyle Gass; Bob Odenkirk
- Starring: Jack Black; Kyle Gass
- Country of origin: United States
- Original language: English
- No. of episodes: 3

Production
- Executive producers: David Cross; Bob Odenkirk; Jack Black; Kyle Gass; Troy Miller
- Producers: Thomas Sherren (episodes 2–3); Tom Gianas
- Production locations: Silvercup Studios, Los Angeles
- Editor: Steve Welch
- Camera setup: Single camera
- Running time: 21–26 minutes
- Production companies: Dakota North Entertainment Inc.; HBO Original Programming

Original release
- Network: HBO
- Release: November 28, 1997 – March 15, 2000

Related
- Tenacious D in the Pick of Destiny

Tenacious D is a limited television series that ran on HBO from 1997 to 2000. It features the fictional accounts of the real-life comedy rock duo of the same name, which is composed of members Jack Black and Kyle Gass. All of the episodes of the show are available on Tenacious D's The Complete Master Works DVD.

There were three half-hour episodes total in the season, each containing two segments. The show included many songs that would later be re-recorded for the band's studio albums Tenacious D in the Pick of Destiny.

In June 2020, the show was added to HBO Max.

== Synopsis ==
The series follows the exploits of JB and KG, the two halves of Tenacious D, the self-proclaimed "greatest band on earth". Their music is heavy on power chords and lyrics about sex, Satan, and why they are "the greatest band on Earth".

Episodes are typically bookended by scenes of the band performing at an open mic night, with the events in between often serving as inspiration for a song performed at the end.

== Dispute with HBO ==
According to Gass, HBO offered Tenacious D a deal to make ten episodes, but in doing so, Black and Gass would have to relinquish their role as executive producers. Gass and Black decided to make a movie instead of giving HBO creative control of Tenacious D, and they made Tenacious D in The Pick of Destiny.

== Episodes ==
No.	Title	Directed by	Written by	Original release date
1	"The Search for Inspirado"	Tom Gianas	Jack Black, David Cross, Kyle Gass, Tom Gianas, Bob Odenkirk	November 28, 1997
1	"Angel in Disguise"	Tom Gianas	Jack Black, David Cross, Kyle Gass, Tom Gianas, Bob Odenkirk	November 28, 1997
After a successful gig at the open-mic night, host Paul F. Tompkins asks Tenacious D to perform a new song. The band searches for inspiration ("inspirado"), but ends up with nothing. The pressure of this leads to the band's brief break-up, which becomes the inspiration for the new song, "Kyle Quit the Band". Songs Played: "History" (released on The Pick of Destiny album); "Kyle Quit the Band" (released on the album Tenacious D, alternative version released on the EP D Fun Pak); After the band performs a sexually explicit song, they are met backstage by a woman (Laura Kightlinger) who propositions them. Kyle immediately agrees, but Jack makes a speech, causing the woman to go away. Jack explains that he is in love with a girl named Flarna, who has several unusual interests. Kyle uses this knowledge to impress Flarna as she is opening up the store she works at, and Jack comes upon them clogging. Flarna enters the store, and Jack and Kyle fight. During their struggle, a robber enters the store unnoticed. He comes out pointing a gun at Flarna, and when Jack objects, fires it at him. Kyle dives in front of the bullet and is seen lying motionless. As Jack sings of his loss, Kyle reappears, and in song attributes his survival to an oversized friendship medallion Jack had given him. Songs Played: "The Sex Song/Sex Supreme" (released on the album Tenacious D as "Double Team"); "You Broke the Rules" (released on the album Tenacious D as "Karate"); "Kyle Took a Bullet"
2	"Death of a Dream"	Tom Gianas Troy Miller	Jack Black, David Cross, Kyle Gass, Tom Gianas, Bill Odenkirk, Bob Odenkirk	November 27, 1999
2	"The Greatest Song in the World"	Tom Gianas Troy Miller	Jack Black, David Cross, Kyle Gass, Tom Gianas, Bill Odenkirk, Bob Odenkirk	November 27, 1999
After another open-mic night, the band announces a T-shirt signing. When nobody shows up for the autograph session, the pair have a chance to talk to the store owner, Captain Ed, (played by Ernest M. Garcia), a disillusioned ex-musician who compares believing in the rock star mythos to believing in the Sasquatch. The band almost gives up on their dream, but as they prepare to burn their guitars in a campfire near a forest, they encounter the Sasquatch, (played by John C. Reilly). The Sasquatch attempts to join Tenacious D as a drummer and is rebuffed, but the band writes and performs a song about him, which he witnesses in disguise. Songs Played: "Cosmic Shame"; "Kielbasa" (released on the album Tenacious D); "Sasquatch"; As Jack and Kyle are playing a golf game within their apartment, they are interrupted by a writer (played by Scott Adsit) who has moved into the apartment next door. After he leaves, the band engages in several bizarre and noisy pre-show rituals, which bother their new neighbor. He calls the police, and the band sings their song "Tribute", to explain their side of the story. Songs Played: "Tribute" (revised version released on the album Tenacious D)
3	"The Fan"	Tom Gianas Troy Miller	Jack Black, David Cross, Kyle Gass, Tom Gianas, Bill Odenkirk, Bob Odenkirk	March 15, 2000
3	"Road Gig"	Tom Gianas Troy Miller	Jack Black, David Cross, Kyle Gass, Tom Gianas, Bill Odenkirk, Bob Odenkirk	March 15, 2000
At the open mic night, JB throws a large collection of guitar picks into the crowd, including his special clear pick, which he cannot continue the show without. After the band leaves the venue, they meet their biggest fan, Lee (actor JR Reed), who gives them the pick and asks them for a picture of the band for his fansite. Jack and Kyle visit the site after getting home, and become obsessed, visiting Lee late at night to give him the photos he requested. The next day, they leave 33 messages on his answering machine, and break into his house after he gets home from work. They sing a song about him, "Lee", which causes Lee to cry tears of joy. The band, plus Lee, then sing a song about their friendship, titled "Special Things", at open mic night. Songs Played: "Explosivo" (released on the album Tenacious D, alternative version released on the EP D Fun Pak); "Lee" (revised version released on the album Tenacious D); "Special Things"; The open-mic night host informs Jack and Kyle that his brother needs a few bands to play at his new club. He suggests the band go, exciting them about the prospect of a "road gig" (although the club is not far). On the way to the show, a bug hits their car's windshield, and Jack pulls over, since the car is out of wiper fluid. Searching for a place to get a refill, the band comes across Jesus Ranch, where a cult is living. The cult buries all of their feces at the ranch, since they believe that whenever people defecate, they lose a portion of their soul. After the band learns this, the county health department arrives at the ranch and demands everyone evacuate immediately. The members of the cult prepare for an armed standoff, and will not allow the band to leave. The health department employees attempt to drive the cult out by playing loud music, so Jack and Kyle play their own music in a sort of battle of the bands. This convinces the health department to pack up their equipment and leave, and after the cult leader gives the band a jug of wiper fluid, they make it to the road gig, where they perform the song "Jesus Ranch". Songs Played: "Warning"; "The Road" - first half in the episode, second half during credits (released on the album Tenacious D); "History" (released on the Pick of Destiny album); "Jesus Ranch" (demo version released on the EP D Fun Pak)
