= Tribute (song) =

2002 single by Tenacious D

Single by Tenacious D

from the album Tenacious D
- Released: February 11, 2002
- Studio: The Boat (Silver Lake, Los Angeles)
- Genre: Hard rock; comedy metal
- Length: 4:07
- Label: Epic
- Songwriters: Jack Black; Kyle Gass
- Producer: The Dust Brothers

Tenacious D singles chronology
"Wonderboy" (2001)	"Tribute" (2002)	"POD" (2006)

Audio sample
- file; help

"Tribute" is a song by American comedy rock duo Tenacious D, and the second single from their self-titled debut album (2001). It was released on February 11, 2002, in the United States and on June 24, 2002, in Australia. The song is a tribute to what Kyle Gass and Jack Black refer to as "The Greatest Song in the World" (often confused as the song's title).

Upon its release, "Tribute" failed to make a commercial impact in the United States, but it became a hit in Australia and New Zealand, peaking at number four on the Australian Singles Chart and number nine on the New Zealand Singles Chart. In Europe, the single charted in the Netherlands, reaching number 25 on the Dutch Top 40, and in the United Kingdom, where it peaked at number 84 in May 2012. The song is certified platinum in Australia and the UK and gold in New Zealand.

The single was re-released in 2021 as part of the band's "Super Power Party Pack", commemorating the twentieth anniversary of the band's debut album.

== History ==
"Tribute" was the first song Black and Gass played live as Tenacious D. The song, like many other songs that were recorded on Tenacious D, was originally performed on their short-lived HBO TV series. During earlier performances of this song, Kyle Gass played the opening to "Stairway to Heaven". The two songs are both in A minor and have very similar chord progressions, and critics have said the songs sound alike.

== Synopsis ==
The song chronicles the band members' encounter with a demon who demands the duo play "the best song in the world" or have their souls eaten. Having nothing to lose from trying, they play "the first thing that came to our heads", which "just so happened to be the best song in the world."

Given the "Stairway to Heaven" interlude in the original TV series version, along with the similarity of the chord progression in both songs, "Tribute" at first implies that the best song in the world is indeed that song. However, the lyrics make clear that "Tribute" sounds nothing like the song they came up with to please the demon; as Black describes: "And the peculiar thing is this, my friends: The song we sang on that fateful night — it didn't actually sound anything like this song."

In an interview, the band claimed that the inspiration from the song came after Jack Black played Metallica's "One" for Kyle Gass, describing it as "the best song in the world", leading to a failed attempt to themselves write an even better song, and a discussion of the meaninglessness of labeling any song that way. "Tribute" was written as a paean to the impossibility of reaching musical perfection, making the claim that the greatest song in the world had in fact been theirs, but that they had forgotten it.

In Tenacious D in The Pick of Destiny, it is implied that the climax of the movie, a rock-off challenge between Satan and Tenacious D told through the song "Beelzeboss (The Final Showdown)", is the incident chronicled in "Tribute", and that the portion of "Beelzeboss" performed by Tenacious D is the song receiving tribute. After defeating Satan, Jack and Kyle recall the incident once more, describing it as, "the greatest song in the world". Unfortunately, they are unable to remember how it went. Also in the song "Beelzeboss", they mention that they know the demon's weakness, referred to as their "Rock-It Sauce", which is what they use in their HBO television series to defeat the demon. Unlike the demon in the television episode, Satan says they are "fuckin' lame" and tries to take Kyle Gass to hell after all, while the demon in "Tribute" asks if they are angels. However, considering that they do not remember the song, they may have forgotten this as well. This was confirmed in a commentary with Jack Black for the movie.

== Music video ==
Jack Black and Kyle Gass in "Tribute" video.

The music video for "Tribute", directed and edited by Liam Lynch, features Jack Black, and Kyle Gass, in a cheap shopping mall karaoke booth, rewired to record their song.

As they sing, the video cuts between footage of the pair walking down the "long, lonesome road" and their encounter with the demon, played by Dave Grohl. The demon also performs the electric guitar solo in the music video. After the solo, Black and Gass jump out of the booth and start shouting the lyrics at mall shoppers and dancing flamboyantly. Passersby include cameos from Lynch and Ben Stiller. While most pay no attention, an old lady, played by Linda Porter, assaults Black with her bag after he grabs her while singing. A policeman, played by JR Reed, who played "Lee" in the band's television series, takes Black and Gass away. At the end, the same old lady who was frightened by the duo picks up the now-recorded CD, eyes glowing red, and cackles demonically.

Although the video had huge success on UK television, the song was never actually released there as a single. "Tribute" was nominated for two Music Video Production Association Awards: "Alternative Video of the Year" and "Directorial Debut of the Year". In addition, it was a nominee for best video in the 2002 Kerrang! Awards.

== Reception ==
Some critics described the plot of the song as being similar to the song "The Devil Went Down to Georgia" by the Charlie Daniels Band.

== Track listings ==
European CD single

1. "Tribute" – 4:08
2. "Jesus Ranch" (demo) – 2:14

European maxi-CD single

1. "Tribute" – 4:08
2. "Cosmic Shame" (recorded live at Cox Arena in San Diego on November 20, 2001) – 4:28
3. "Friendship" – 2:00
4. "Tribute" (video) – 4:08
5. "Wonderboy" (video) – 4:07

Australian and New Zealand CD single

1. "Tribute" – 4:09
2. "Cave Intro" – 0:46
3. "Jesus Ranch" (demo) – 2:14
4. "Kyle Quit the Band" (demo) – 2:10
5. "Explosivo" (Mocean Worker's Megamix) – 5:10

Super Power Party Pack CD (2021)

1. "Tribute"
2. "Cave Intro"
3. "Jesus Ranch" (demo)
4. "Pat Riley"
5. "Explosivo" (Mocean Worker's Megamix)

== Personnel ==
- Jack Black (vocals/acoustic guitar)
- Kyle Gass (backing vocals/acoustic guitar)
- Page McConnell (keys)
- Dave Grohl (drums, rhythm guitar)
- Warren Fitzgerald (electric guitar solo)
- Alfredo Ortiz (additional drums)
- The Dust Brothers (production)
- Ken Andrews (mixer)

== Charts ==
=== Weekly charts ===
Chart (2002–2012)	Peak position
Australia (ARIA)	4
Netherlands (Dutch Top 40)	25
Netherlands (Single Top 100)	26
New Zealand (Recorded Music NZ)	9
Scottish Singles Sales (Official Charts)	74
UK Singles (Official Charts)	84
UK Rock & Metal (Official Charts)	1

=== Year-end charts ===
Chart (2002)	Position
Australia (ARIA)	15

== Certifications ==
Region	Certification	Certified units/sales
Australia (ARIA)	Platinum	70,000^{^}
Denmark (IFPI Danmark)	Gold	45,000^{‡}
New Zealand (RMNZ)	2× Platinum	60,000^{‡}
United Kingdom (BPI)	Platinum	600,000^{‡}
^{^} Shipments figures based on certification alone.^{‡} Sales+streaming figures based on certification alone.

== Release history ==
Region	Date	Format(s)	Label(s)	Ref.
United States	February 11, 2002	Alternative radio	Epic	
Australia	June 24, 2002	CD	Epic	

== Other versions ==
Polish heavy metal band Nocny Kochanek has recorded a Polish version of the song in 2018, called Tribjut (English word "tribute" as heard in Polish). The story revolves around two members of the band strolling around Warsaw in the night until they meet the Devil lying down on a street. They all go binge drinking in the capital of Poland, culminating with the Devil passing out.

== In popular culture ==
"Tribute" was released as a downloadable track for Rock Band in addition to appearing as a playable track for Guitar Hero Live. On March 5, 2026, it was added to the rhythm game Fortnite Festival as a purchasable track.

== See also ==
- Devil's Trill Sonata
- "Best Song Ever", which also revolves around an unnamed best song of all time
