= Wonderboy (Tenacious D song) =

- Australia and New Zealand CD Cover

Single by Tenacious D

from the album Tenacious D
- Released: September 25, 2001 (US, UK, Australia and New Zealand)
- Studio: The Boat, Los Angeles
- Genre: Hard rock, comedy rock
- Length: 4:06
- Label: Sony Music International
- Songwriter(s): Jack Black, Kyle Gass
- Producer(s): Dust Brothers

Tenacious D singles chronology
"Wonderboy" (2001)	"Tribute" (2002)

Audio sample
- file; help

"Wonderboy" is the debut single by American rock-comedy duo Tenacious D. It was released in September 2001 on the same day as their self-titled debut album. The song peaked at number 36 in the UK and number 44 in Australia; the video, directed by Spike Jonze, was also well received. The song is also the entrance theme for UFC fighter Stephen Thompson whose nickname is "Wonderboy".

== Structure ==
Strings were played by Andrew Gross, a classmate of Jack Black, who penned the orchestral score for Tenacious D in The Pick of Destiny. He also played strings on several songs on this album.

Jack Black's friend, Buckethead, occasionally covered the song when playing live.

== Music video ==
The lyrics of the song tell the tale of the superhero Wonderboy (Black) as he forms an alliance with his lute-wielding arch-rival Young Nasty Man (KG) and forms the band Tenacious D. Wonderboy's powers are not revealed in the song but according to the lyrics we know that Young Nasty Man has powers that are "comparable" to Wonderboy's. Young Nasty Man has a variety of seemingly telekinetic powers, such as flight via levitation, "mind bullets" via telekinesis (with an apparent range of at least 200 yards and enough force to "kill a yak"), and "the power to move you". The song also mentions Wonderboy's castle made of clouds, the use of swords, and an attempt to destroy a hydra, which is not seen in the video, but is mentioned in the song.

In the video, Wonderboy and Young Nasty Man are portrayed as Medieval/Mythological skill-and-strength heroes, climbing a snowy mountain. At the end of the video they fight a monster (which is off-screen but its flaming breath can be seen) and Wonderboy perishes, having been run through by his own sword. The fates of Young Nasty Man and the monster (presumably the fire-breathing hydra mentioned in the lyrics) remain unknown.

The video was directed by Spike Jonze under the alias of Marcus Von Bueler. The producer was Vincent Landay and K. K. Barrett was the stunt director. The production company was Satellite Films. The music video was first aired during the week beginning October 29, 2001.

In 2002, Spike Jonze won an award from the MVPA (Music Video Production Association) for the "Best Direction of a New Artist" for his work on "Wonderboy".

"Wonderboy" (live)
Sample of "Wonderboy" performed live by Tenacious D.

== Track listings ==
US CD single (Epic Records #673351 5)

1. "Wonderboy" – 4:07
2. "Cosmic Shame" (live) – 4:28 Recorded at Cox Arena in San Diego on November 20, 2001.
3. "Kyle Quit the Band" (demo) – 2:10
4. "Wonderboy– (video) – 4:07

Australia and New Zealand CD single (Epic Records #673286.2)

1. "Wonderboy" – 4:07
2. "Tribute" (Channel V Performance) – 4.34
3. "Tribute" (video) – 4:08

UK CD single (Epic Records #673351 2)

1. "Wonderboy" – 4:07
2. "Jesus Ranch" (demo) – 2:14
3. "Tribute" (video) – 4:08

Promotional CD (Epic Records #XPCD2756)

1. "Wonderboy" – 4:07

== Personnel ==
- Jack Black – vocals, acoustic guitar
- Kyle Gass – backing vocals, acoustic guitar
- Page McConnell – keys
- Dave Grohl – drums/guitar
- Alfredo Ortiz – additional drums
- Andrew Gross – strings
- Dust Brothers – production
- Ken Andrews – mixer

== Charts ==
Chart performance for "Wonderboy"
Chart (2002)	Peak position
Australia (ARIA)	48
UK Singles (Official Charts Company)	34
