= Tenacious D (album) =

Studio album by Tenacious D
- Released: September 25, 2001
- Recorded: January–February 2001
- Studios: The Boat, Silver Lake, Los Angeles; ArchAngel Recording Studio, Los Angeles
- Genres: Comedy rock; hard rock; heavy metal; acoustic rock; punk rock
- Length: 50:35
- Label: Epic
- Producer: The Dust Brothers

Tenacious D chronology
Tenacious D (2001)	D Fun Pak (2002)

Singles from Tenacious D
- 1. "Wonderboy" Released: September 25, 2001; 2. "Tribute" Released: February 11, 2002

Tenacious D is the debut studio album by American comedy rock duo Tenacious D, released on September 25, 2001, by Epic Records. The album's polished production was a departure from the band's acoustic origins, due in part to the production of the Dust Brothers. "Wonderboy" was the first single released from the album, followed by "Tribute". Both singles had music videos filmed for them, with the Liam Lynch-directed "Tribute" video achieving cult status. While Tenacious D did not achieve chart success after its release, it was certified platinum by the Recording Industry Association of America (RIAA) by the end of 2005. Despite only peaking at number 38 in the UK, it had sold 426,000 copies countrywide by 2006.

== Conception ==
For their first album, they enlisted the help of drummer Dave Grohl, keyboardist Page McConnell of Phish, guitarist Warren Fitzgerald, and bass player Steven Shane McDonald. The Dust Brothers produced the album. The majority of the songs on their debut album stem from early versions as seen on their HBO TV series, Tenacious D. The record itself does not list the song titles on the back cover as is the convention but instead on the back cover of the jacket; therefore one must open the CD (after presumably buying it) to read them. This is perhaps to allow songs with expletives or words otherwise deemed offensive to escape censorship or omission.

=== Recording ===
The recording session for the album began with a two-day session at Neil Diamond's ArcAngel studio in Los Angeles where initial drum tracks were recorded. They were able to use the studio because Diamond had just appeared with Black in the film Saving Silverman, in which Black plays a Neil Diamond cover singer. "Diamond claims it was the Liberty Records studio," King says. "It's a really old place." At least one song was cut from the final release of the album. A studio recording of "Jesus Ranch," the final song from the HBO shorts (the closing credits feature the end of "The Road"), was omitted from the album because "it just didn't cut the mustard" (quoted by the D in the FAQ section of their website). The HBO version can be found on their DVD, The Complete Masterworks, and a recorded studio demo can be found on their 2002 EP, D Fun Pak.

=== Album cover controversy ===
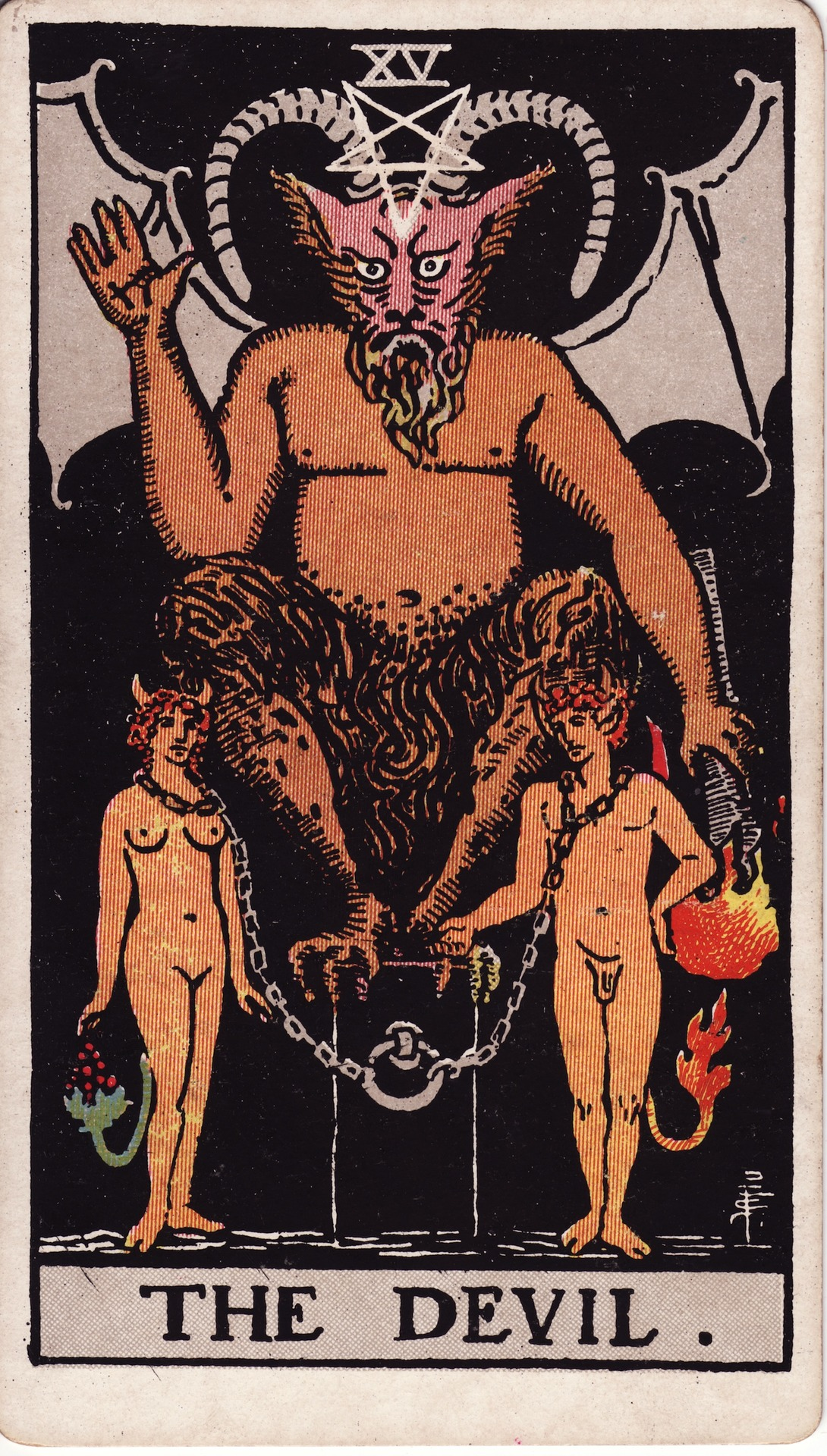
The Devil Card

The front cover features Black and Gass standing naked below the Devil. The pose is similar to that shown on some Devil tarot cards. Due to the Satanic nature of the cover, the album was briefly recalled from stores. The band performed in front of this at concerts.

== Structure ==
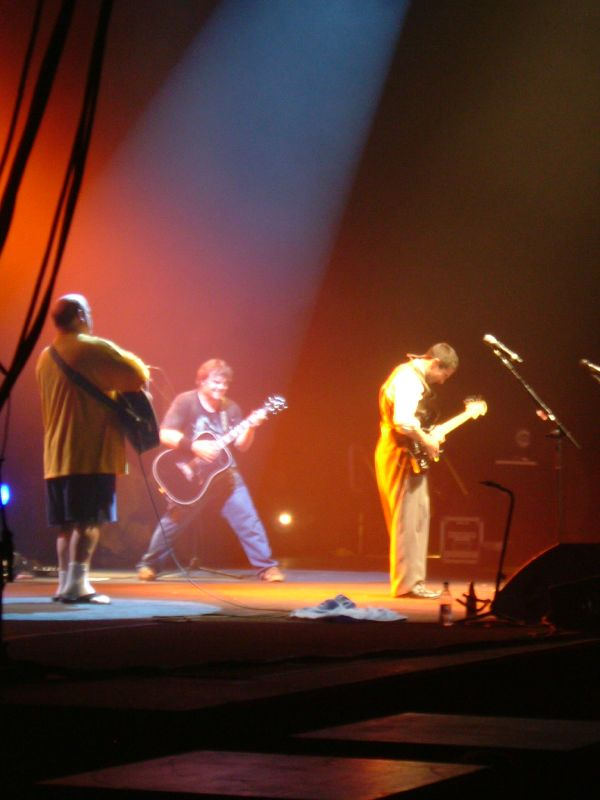
Tenacious D performing "Double Team" as an encore

"Kielbasa"
Kielbasa

"Double Team"
Double Team

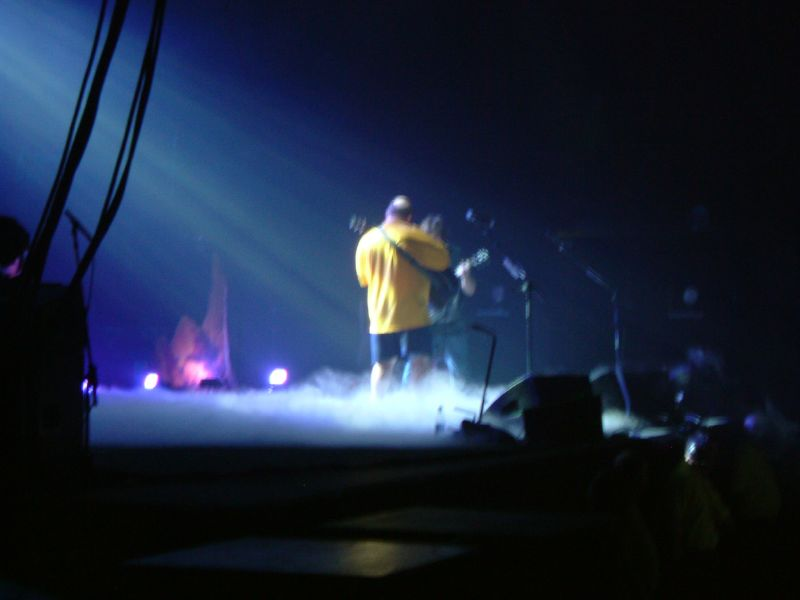
Tenacious D performing "Tribute"

The first single "Wonderboy", a biographical ballad, was critically well-received, with the BBC describing it as "endearing". In 2002, the video, directed by Spike Jonze, won a Music Video Production Association for "Best Direction of a Music Video".

"Tribute", the second single from the album, discusses the "greatest song in the world" written to save the souls of Gass and Black from a demon but later forgotten. The song dropped guitar riffs from Led Zeppelin's "Stairway to Heaven" which had appeared in early versions. The single, the band's most successful, achieved Tenacious D's only chart top-ten peaking at number 4 in Australia. The video, directed by Liam Lynch, was voted by Kerrang! readers as the fifth best music video.

The third music video for "Fuck Her Gently", a song described as an "underground hit" and, according to Black, lauded by women's groups depicted an animated Black and Gass as cherubs by John Kricfalusi, the creator of Ren and Stimpy.

The album opens with "Kielbasa", a song discussing anal sex. The previously popular pseudo-science book, Dianetics is also mentioned, and Krishna. "Dio" is a tribute to Ronnie James Dio that calls for the singer to "pass the torch" on to Tenacious D. Black has said that this was a compliment as they could have asked others for the torch but "ultimately, we were bestowing an honor upon him." Reportedly, Dio approved of the song and let Tenacious D appear in the video for his single, "Push". In addition, Dio also appeared in the 2006 film Tenacious D in The Pick of Destiny, playing himself. "Explosivo" was originally intended as a tribute to Kurt Cobain.

Seven of the tracks on the album are comedy skits: "One Note Song", "Hard Fucking", "Inward Singing", "Cock Pushups", "Friendship Test", "Karate Schnitzel" and "Drive-Thru".

"Double Team" is another song on the topic of sex, in particular threesomes. "The Road" deals with groupies whilst touring. "Lee", named after their "no 1 fan" Lee, is a song from the short "The Fan", in which the band stalk their biggest fan, and sing an obsessive song about him. "Karate" is described as an aggressive song taken from the short "Angel in Disguise" in which Black and Gass fight. The song ends with Black saying the words 'donkey crap' in reverse audio. "Kyle Quit The Band", from "The Search for Inspirado", is a song which documents the band reuniting after breaking up.

"Rock Your Socks" with Tenacious D's desire to prove its classical and rock prowess through giving "a taste" of Bach's Bourrée in E minor from Suite in E minor for Lute, BWV 996, also used in another of Tenacious D song – "Classico". ("That is Bach and it rocks..."), popularized by one of the most famous classical guitarists: Andrés Segovia and prog rock band, Jethro Tull. The song features a shock comedy climax when lead singer Jack Black asks for the listener, in return for their troubles in playing to them, to perform a coprophilic ritual (referred to colloquially as a Cleveland steamer).

"Friendship" talks of Black and Gass' relationship. They sing of friendship being "rare".

In "City Hall", the longest song on the album – described as epic – lead singer Black calls for the legalisation of cannabis. The song is described by the band, and others as a rock opera.

Some critics have lamented that songs performed live and featured on the TV series were not included on the album. These include "Jesus Ranch" and "Cosmic Shame".

== Touring ==
In support of the album, the band embarked on a national tour. All the songs were performed acoustically. The band covered Queen's "Flash" and The Beatles "You Never Give Me Your Money".

Tenacious D shows featured "City Hall" in the encore, a song about rioting against the government, and it played at shows until the events of September 11 attacks. The band initially removed the song from the set, but would eventually return it in the spring of 2002.

== Critical reception ==
Professional ratings
Aggregate scores
Source	Rating
Metacritic	85/100
Review scores
Source	Rating
AllMusic	4.5/5 stars
E! Online	C+
Entertainment Weekly	A
The Guardian	2/5 stars
Rolling Stone	3.5/5 stars
Slant Magazine	3.5/5 stars
Tom Hull – on the Web	C–
The Village Voice	C+

Tenacious D's first album garnered critical acclaim. Review aggregate website Metacritic gave the album a score of 85 out of 100, signifying "universal acclaim". Entertainment Weekly described the release as being "hilarious," and "no mere comedy record." AllMusic said it "rocks so damn hard" but it reflects on the lack of some of the songs from the HBO episodes. The A.V. Club wrote that Black and Gass manage "an odd simultaneous fusion of stupid and clever", while Time wrote, "The pleasures of Tenacious D... flow from a similar revelation: Black and Gass set themselves up as buffoons with titles like Karate Schnitzel, then proceed to defy expectations with precise guitars, polished vocal harmonies and slamming backup musicians".

Splendid magazine said of Tenacious D, "As entertainment, Tenacious D succeeds surprisingly well – for the first few listens.... The only long-term replay value you'll get from this record will come from playing it for friends who haven't heard it." Flak Magazine criticised the band's use of skits between songs, describing them as "distracting" and a "nuisance". In addition, Andy Gill of The Independent remarked that the album was full of "swearing and scatology" and was "bereft of even the slightest skidmark of humour".

== Track listing ==
All tracks are written by Tenacious D, except "Friendship Test" skit by Bob Odenkirk.

No.	Title	Length
1.	"Kielbasa"	3:00
2.	"One Note Song" (skit)	1:23
3.	"Tribute"	4:08
4.	"Wonderboy"	4:06
5.	"Hard Fucking" (skit)	0:35
6.	"Fuck Her Gently"	2:03
7.	"Explosivo"	1:55
8.	"Dio"	1:41
9.	"Inward Singing" (skit)	2:13
10.	"Kyle Quit the Band"	1:29
11.	"The Road"	2:18
12.	"Cock Pushups" (skit)	0:48
13.	"Lee"	1:02
14.	"Friendship Test" (skit)	1:30
15.	"Friendship"	1:59
16.	"Karate Schnitzel" (skit)	0:36
17.	"Karate"	1:05
18.	"Rock Your Socks"	3:32
19.	"Drive-Thru" (skit)	3:00
20.	"Double Team"	3:10
21.	"City Hall/I Believe/Malibu Nights Medley"	9:02
Total length:		50:35

Bonus tracks
No.	Title	Length
1.	"Jesus Ranch" (Full band digital track with album purchase via tenaciousd.com)	3:10
2.	"Pat Riley" (Acoustic digital track with 2013 vinyl re-issue)	2:24

== Personnel ==
Tenacious D

- Jack Black – lead vocals, rhythm acoustic guitar
- Kyle Gass – lead acoustic guitar, rhythm electric guitar, backing vocals

Additional musicians

- Dave Grohl – drums, guitar on tracks 1, 3, 4, 7, 8, 11, 18, 20, 21
- Steve McDonald – bass guitar
- Warren Fitzgerald – lead electric guitar
- Page McConnell – keyboards
- Alfredo Ortiz – percussion on tracks 3, 15, 18, 20
- Woody Jackson – sitar on track 1
- Andrew Gross – strings on tracks 4, 6
- Ken Andrews – guitar on tracks 3, 10, 11, 15
- John King – echoplex on track 7

Production

- Produced by The Dust Brothers (John King and Michael Simpson)
- Assistant engineer – Tony Scloss
- Mixed by Ken Andrews, except tracks 2, 5, 6, 9, 12, 14, 16, 17, 19, which were mixed by The Dust Brothers
- Assistant mixing engineer – Cameron Webb
- Engineer for Dave Grohl sessions – Adam Kasper
- Engineer at ArchAngel – Bernie Becker
- Recorded at The Boat (RCR Labs) in Silverlake, California
- Drums Recorded at ArchAngel Recording Studio
- Mixed at Larrabee North in North Hollywood, California
- Sound Castle Recording Studios in Los Angeles, California
- Record One Studios in Sherman Oaks, CA
- Mastered by Tom Baker for Precision Mastering in Hollywood, California
- Art direction and design: Brandy Flower
- Photography: Sean Murphy and Matthew Gass

== Charts ==
=== Weekly charts ===
Chart (2001–2002)	Peak position
Australian Albums (ARIA)	13
Dutch Albums (Album Top 100)	33
German Albums (Offizielle Top 100)	96
Irish Albums (IRMA)	18
New Zealand Albums (RMNZ)	42
Norwegian Albums (VG-lista)	37
Swedish Albums (Sverigetopplistan)	19
UK Albums (Official Charts)	38
US Billboard 200	33

=== Year-end charts ===
Chart (2002)	Position
Australian Albums (ARIA)	68
Canadian Alternative Albums (Nielsen SoundScan)	170
UK Albums (OCC)	95

== Certifications ==
Certifications and sales for Tenacious D
Region	Certification	Certified units/sales
Austria (IFPI Austria)	Gold	20,000^{*}
Germany (BVMI)	Gold	150,000^{‡}
New Zealand (RMNZ)	Gold	7,500^{‡}
United Kingdom (BPI)	2× Platinum	600,000^{^}
United States (RIAA)	Platinum	1,000,000^{^}
^{*} Sales figures based on certification alone.^{^} Shipments figures based on certification alone.^{‡} Sales+streaming figures based on certification alone.
