= POD (song) =

Single by Tenacious D

from the album The Pick of Destiny
- Released: October 30, 2006
- Genre: Hard rock, comedy rock
- Length: 2:32
- Label: Epic
- Songwriters: Jack Black, Kyle Gass
- Producer: John King

Tenacious D singles chronology
"Wonderboy" (2002)	"POD" (2006)

Audio sample
- file; help

"POD" (also known as "The Pick of Destiny") is a song by American rock band Tenacious D, featured on their 2006 second album The Pick of Destiny. Written by Jack Black and Kyle Gass, the song was released as the lead single from the album on October 30, 2006.

== Music video ==
The music video for "POD" was directed by Liam Lynch, produced by Grant Jue, of the Oil Factory production company and edited by David Rennie and Liam Lynch. Robert Brinkmann was the director of photography. In the video, Jack and Kyle go to a movie theatre to watch Tenacious D in The Pick of Destiny, but wind up disturbing the audience with their antics to the point where they are forcibly thrown out of their own movie. The version seen on TV is slightly different from the one found on the DVD. Instead of "fuckin' insane", the lyric is changed to "freakin' insane" and "flippin' insane" and "completely profane". When Jack Black is kicked out of the movie theater, he tells a man to "sniff on my booty"; on the DVD Jack Black asks a man to "suck on my boney".

== Formats and track listing ==
CD single (Epic Records #88697029612)

1. "POD" – 2:32
2. "Master Exploder" – 2:24
3. "Training Medley" – 1:11
4. "Pick of Destiny" (video)

7" single (Epic Records #88697030227)

1. "POD"
2. "Kong"

Promotional CD (Epic Records #88697007462)

1. "POD" (clean version) – 2:40
2. "POD" (album version) – 2:32

== Personnel ==
- Jack Black – vocals, acoustic guitar
- Kyle Gass – backing vocals, acoustic guitar
- John Konesky – electric guitar
- John Spiker – bass
- Dave Grohl – drums
- John King – production
- Ken Andrews – mixer

== Charts ==
Chart performance for "POD"
Chart (2006)	Peak position
Ireland (IRMA)	20
UK Singles (Official Charts)	24
US Billboard Hot 100	78
