= Post-Apocalypto Tour =

2018–20 concert tour by Tenacious D

- World tour by Tenacious D
- Promotional poster for European dates of the tour
- Location: North America; Europe; South America
- Associated album: Post-Apocalypto
- Start date: November 3, 2018
- End date: February 26, 2020
- Legs: 7
- No. of shows: 63

Tenacious D concert chronology
- Rize of the Fenix Tour (2012); Post-Apocalypto Tour (2018–20); The Spicy Meatball Tour (2023–24)

The Post-Apocalypto Tour was a concert tour by American comedy rock band Tenacious D. The tour was in support of the band's YouTube animatic series Tenacious D in Post-Apocalypto and its accompanying soundtrack album Post-Apocalypto, which were released in November 2018. The tour began on November 3, 2018 and ended on February 26, 2020. This tour surpassed the band's 2012 Rize of the Fenix Tour as the longest Tenacious D tour in October 2019 with over 1.8 million people.

Unlike other Tenacious D tours, this tour had a substantial gap from January to May 2019 where there were no performances. Black would later claim that the reason for this hiatus is due to him being required to film Jumanji: The Next Level.

The band confirmed the end of the Post-Apocalypto Tour on March 2, 2020, stating that they would commence on their "The Purple Nurple Tour... Twisting Hard to the Left!" in the United States through September and October 2020, partnering with 46 for 46 to raise awareness of voting for the 2020 United States presidential election, particularity the swing states. The tour was later cancelled due to the COVID-19 pandemic.

== History ==
This tour was primarily in support of Tenacious D in Post-Apocalypto, a hand-drawn animatic series which was released on YouTube from September to November in 2018. The series was entirely drawn by Black, and solely written and voiced by Black and Gass. The vast majority of performances on this tour featured a large front-drop curtain screen, which had visuals from the episodes projected onto it. When the songs played, the curtain was see-through, and revealed Black and Gass performing. A special, shortened cut of the episodes was created to be played in-between the songs for the tour. Due to most outdoor venues being unable to accommodate the curtain, the band skipped the vast majority of the Post-Apocalypto songs at festivals and amphitheatres, starting the performance with "JB Jr. Rap" onwards, and then with a large backdrop of a crudely drawn castle which was erected during "Rize of the Fenix".

The performance at Red Rocks Amphitheatre in Colorado on July 25, 2019 featured the Colorado Symphony orchestra throughout the performance.

The July performance at the Palace Theater was broadcast on Oculus Rift.

The performance at Rock in Rio Festival in Brazil on September 28, 2019 featured Internet sensation Junior Bass Groovador on a cover of "Smells Like Teen Spirit" by Nirvana.

The performances on the February 2020 European leg featured subtitles in the country's respective languages.

== Average set list ==
Post-Apocalypto set

1. "Hope"
2. "Making Love"
3. "Take Us Into Space"
4. "Fuck Yo-Yo Ma"
5. "Daddy Ding Dong"
6. "Robot"
7. "Colors"
8. "JB. Jr Rap"
9. "Woman Time"
10. "Save the World"
11. "Post-Apocalypto Theme (Reprise)"

Greatest hits set

1. "Rize of the Fenix"
2. "Low Hangin' Fruit"
3. "Sax-a-Boom"
4. "Roadie"
5. "Kickapoo"
6. "Beelzeboss (The Final Showdown)"
7. "The Metal"
8. "Dio"
9. "Kielbasa"
10. "Tribute"
11. "Double Team"

Encore

1. "Fuck Her Gently"

== Opening acts ==
Acoustic duo Wynchester, composed of longtime Tenacious D guitarist John Konesky, alongside Kyle Gass Band vocalist, Mike Bray, opened for every night of the tour, excluding festivals and support appearances. The band released their self-titled debut album Wynchester in May 2018.

== Tour dates ==
Date	City	Country	Venue	Opening act
Leg 1 — North America #1
November 3, 2018	New York City	United States	Kings Theatre	Wynchester
November 4, 2018	New York City	United States	Kings Theatre	Wynchester
November 5, 2018	Boston	United States	House of Blues	Wynchester
November 7, 2018	Washington, D.C.	United States	The Anthem	Wynchester
November 8, 2018	Philadelphia	United States	The Fillmore	Wynchester
November 9, 2018	Pittsburgh	United States	Stage AE	Wynchester
November 10, 2018	Columbus	United States	Express Live!	Wynchester
November 12, 2018	Detroit	United States	The Fillmore	Wynchester
November 13, 2018	Chicago	United States	Riviera Theatre	Wynchester
November 14, 2018	Chicago	United States	Riviera Theatre	Wynchester
Leg 2 — North America #2
December 9, 2018	Calgary	Canada	Grey Eagle Resort and Casino	Wynchester
December 10, 2018	Calgary	Canada	Grey Eagle Resort and Casino	Wynchester
December 11, 2018	Edmonton	Canada	Shaw Conference Centre	Wynchester
December 13, 2018	Vancouver	Canada	Queen Elizabeth Theatre	Wynchester
December 14, 2018	Seattle	United States	Moore Theatre	Wynchester
December 15, 2018	Portland	United States	Crystal Ballroom*	Wynchester
December 17, 2018	Oakland	United States	Fox Oakland Theatre	Wynchester
December 18, 2018	Oakland	United States	Fox Oakland Theatre	Wynchester
December 21, 2018	Los Angeles	United States	Hollywood Palladium	Wynchester
December 30, 2018	Las Vegas	United States	The Joint at Hard Rock Hotel and Casino	Wynchester
December 31, 2018	Las Vegas	United States	The Joint at Hard Rock Hotel and Casino	Wynchester
Leg 3 — Europe #1
June 1, 2019	London	England	Wembley Arena	Wynchester
June 2, 2019	London	England	Wembley Arena	Wynchester
June 4, 2019	Copenhagen	Denmark	Royal Arena	Wynchester
June 5, 2019	Oslo	Norway	Oslo Spektrum	Wynchester
June 6, 2019	Sölvesborg	Sweden	Sweden Rock Festival*	
June 8, 2018	Nuremberg	Germany	Rock im Park Festival*	
June 9, 2019	Nürburg	Germany	Rock am Ring Festival*	
June 10, 2019	Landgraaf	Netherlands	Pinkpop Festival*	
Leg 4 — North America #3
July 25, 2019	Morrison	United States	Red Rocks Amphitheatre*	Wynchester
July 27, 2019	Kansas City	United States	Starlight Theatre*	Wynchester
July 28, 2019	Lincoln	United States	Pinewood Bowl Theatre*	Wynchester
July 30, 2019	Saint Paul	United States	Palace Theatre	Wynchester
July 31, 2019	Saint Paul	United States	Palace Theatre	Wynchester
August 2, 2019	St. Louis	United States	Stifel Theatre	Wynchester
August 3, 2019	Chicago	United States	Lollapalooza Festival*	
August 4, 2019	Nashville	United States	Ascend Amphitheater*	Wynchester
August 5, 2019	Atlanta	United States	Coca-Cola Roxy	Wynchester
Leg 5 — South America
September 28, 2019	Rio de Janeiro	Brazil	Rock in Rio Festival*	
October 1, 2019	Bogotá	Colombia	Estadio El Campín*	Supporting Foo Fighters
Leg 6 — North America #4
October 15, 2019	New Orleans	United States	The Fillmore	Wynchester
October 16, 2019	Houston	United States	Revention Music Center	Wynchester
October 17, 2019	Austin	United States	ACL Live	Wynchester
October 19, 2019	Dallas	United States	The Bomb Factory	Wynchester
October 20, 2019	Oklahoma City	United States	The Criterion	Wynchester
October 21, 2019	Tulsa	United States	Brady Theater	Wynchester
October 23, 2019	Phoenix	United States	Comerica Theatre	Wynchester
October 25, 2019	San Francisco	United States	Masonic Auditorium	Wynchester
October 26, 2019	Reno	United States	Grand Theatre at the Grand Sierra Resort	Wynchester
October 27, 2019	Santa Barbara	United States	Arlington Theater	Wynchester
October 29, 2019	Los Angeles	United States	Wiltern Theater	Wynchester
Leg 7 — Europe #2
February 10, 2020	Dublin	Ireland	3Arena	Wynchester
February 12, 2020	Munich	Germany	Olympiahalle	Wynchester
February 13, 2020	Vienna	Austria	Wiener Stadthalle	Wynchester
February 15, 2020	Luxembourg City	Luxembourg	Rockhal	Wynchester
February 16, 2020	Frankfurt	Germany	Festhalle	Wynchester
February 17, 2020	Berlin	Germany	Max-Schmeling-Halle	Wynchester
February 19, 2020	Milan	Italy	Lorenzini District	Wynchester
February 20, 2020	Zürich	Switzerland	Samsung Hall	Wynchester
February 22, 2020	Dortmund	Germany	Westfalenhallen	Wynchester
February 23, 2020	Amsterdam	Netherlands	Ziggo Dome	Wynchester
February 24, 2020	Brussels	Belgium	Forest National	Wynchester
February 26, 2020	Paris	France	Zénith	Wynchester

All events highlighted with (*) mean that the show was without the projection curtain. This could be due to the venue being outdoors, or logistical problems with the venue.

== Personnel ==
- Jack Black – lead vocals, additional guitar
- Kyle Gass – lead guitar, additional vocals, flute
- John Konesky – electric guitar, additional vocals
- John Spiker – bass guitar, additional vocals
- Scott Seiver – drums

== See also ==
- Tenacious D in Post-Apocalypto
