= The Pick of Destiny Tour (2006–2007) =

Tenacious D concert tour

- World tour by Tenacious D
- Promotional poster for the Glasgow date on the tour
- Location: Europe; North America; Oceania
- Associated album: The Pick of Destiny
- Start date: November 11, 2006
- End date: February 21, 2007
- Legs: 4
- No. of shows: 32

Tenacious D concert chronology
- The Pick of Destiny Tour (2006–07); Rize of the Fenix Tour (2012)

The Pick of Destiny Tour was a worldwide concert tour by American rock band Tenacious D. The tour was in support of the band's 2006 film, Tenacious D in The Pick of Destiny and its accompanying soundtrack The Pick of Destiny, released as the band's second studio album. The tour visited North America, Europe and Australia, beginning on November 11, 2006 and ending on February 21, 2007, featuring 32 shows in total. Footage from the shows at the Paramount Theatre in Seattle on February 16 and 17, 2007 were released on The Complete Master Works 2 DVD and Blu-ray in November 2008.

The duo had previously toured only acoustically, therefore, this tour was the first ever series of live shows to feature Black and Gass on stage with a full backing-band, as they had only previously performed with a band in the recording studio and on occasional TV appearances. The backing band for the tour consisted of guitarists John Konesky and John Spiker from Gass' side-project Trainwreck, as well as Bad Religion drummer Brooks Wackerman. This was also the band's first ever major concert tour with an elaborate stage set and lighting, as they had previously only toured with little to no set design.

== Average set list ==
Kyle's Apartment (acoustic set)

1. "Kielbasa"
2. "History"
3. "Flash" (Queen cover) / "Wonderboy"
4. "Dio"
5. "Lee"
6. "Sax-a-Boom"
7. "The Road"

Hell (full band set)

8. "Kickapoo"
9. "Karate"
10. "Dude (I Totally Miss You)"
11. "Kyle Quit The Band"
12. "Friendship"
13. "The Metal"
14. "Break In-City (Storm the Gate!)"
15. "Car Chase City"
16. "Papagenu (He's My Sassafrass)"
17. "Master Exploder" (tape)
18. "Beelzeboss (The Final Showdown)"
19. "Double Team"

Encore

20. "Fuck Her Gently"
21. "Tribute"
22. "Pinball Wizard" / "There's A Doctor" / "Go to the Mirror!" (The Who cover medley)

== Opening acts ==
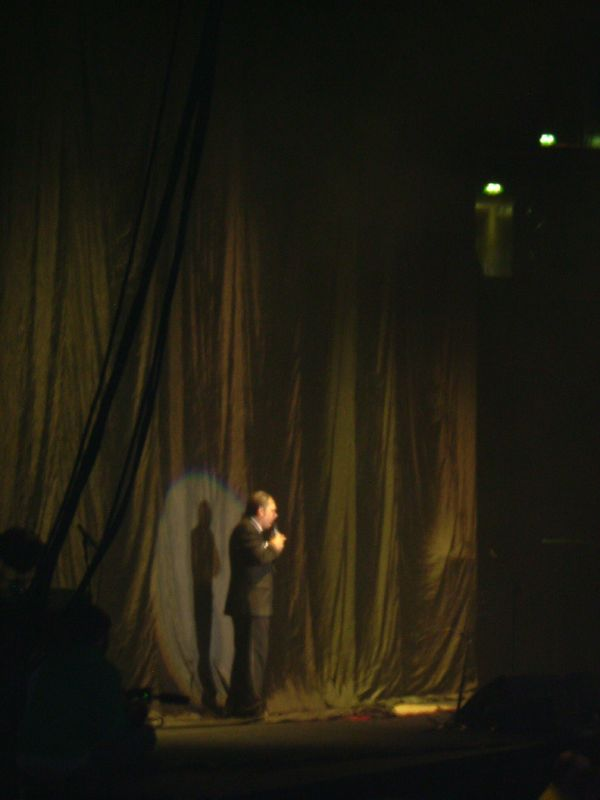
Neil Hamburger opening

In the US and the UK shows opened up with comedian Neil Hamburger. The US shows at Madison Square Garden and Arlington Theater saw Supafloss open in addition to Neil Hamburger.

In Australia, Tex Perkins and Tim Rogers opened, playing as T'n'T as well as Dave McCormack at other shows.

Jack Black also gave two young boys the opportunity of letting them open Tenacious D's show in Christchurch, New Zealand after seeing them busking in Cathedral Square. Max Tetley, 11, and Alex Philpot, 10, performed "All Along the Watchtower", "Knockin' On Heaven's Door" and "Mr. Tambourine Man" in front of the crowd.

== Internet Archive albums ==
Three albums were released with the explicit permission of Tenacious D. These live shows have been recorded and released through Internet Archive and are available for free digital download.

Date recorded	Venue	Location	Downloads
November 28, 2006	Orpheum Theater	Boston	2,000
December 3, 2006	Patriot Center	Fairfax	28,000

== Tour dates ==
List of 2006 concerts
Date	City	Country	Venue	Opening act
November 11, 2006	Las Vegas	United States	House of Blues	Neil Hamburger
November 17, 2006	Los Angeles	United States	Gibson Amphitheatre	Neil Hamburger; Daphne Aguilera
November 18, 2006	Los Angeles	United States	Gibson Amphitheatre	Neil Hamburger; Supafloss
November 20, 2006	San Francisco	United States	Bill Graham Civic Auditorium	Neil Hamburger
November 22, 2006	Denver	United States	The Fillmore	Neil Hamburger
November 24, 2006	Chicago	United States	UIC Pavilion	Neil Hamburger
November 25, 2006	Detroit	United States	Detroit Masonic Temple	Neil Hamburger
November 27, 2006	Toronto	Canada	Ricoh Coliseum	Neil Hamburger
November 28, 2006	Boston	United States	Orpheum Theatre	Neil Hamburger
November 29, 2006	Camden	United States	Tweeter Center	Neil Hamburger
December 1, 2006	New York City	United States	Madison Square Garden	Neil Hamburger; Supafloss
December 3, 2006	Fairfax	United States	Patriot Center	Neil Hamburger
December 5, 2006	Duluth	United States	Gwinnett Center Arena	Neil Hamburger
December 10, 2006	Dublin	Ireland	RDS Simmonscourt	Neil Hamburger
December 11, 2006	Glasgow	Scotland	SECC	Neil Hamburger
December 12, 2006	Manchester	England	Manchester Arena	Neil Hamburger
December 15, 2006	Birmingham	England	National Exhibition Centre	Neil Hamburger
December 17, 2006	Brighton	England	Brighton Centre	Neil Hamburger
December 18, 2006	London	England	Hammersmith Apollo	Neil Hamburger
December 19, 2006	London	England	Hammersmith Apollo	Neil Hamburger

List of 2007 concerts
Date	City	Country	Venue	Opening act
January 9, 2007	Christchurch	New Zealand	Christchurch Town Hall	Black Tear; Lindon Puffin
January 11, 2007	Auckland	New Zealand	Logan Campbell Centre	Crumb
January 13, 2007	Brisbane	Australia	Brisbane Entertainment Centre	David McCormack
January 16, 2007	Sydney	Australia	Hordern Pavilion	T'N'T
January 18, 2007	Adelaide	Australia	Thebarton Theatre	T'N'T
January 19, 2007	Melbourne	Australia	Festival Hall	T'N'T
February 13, 2007	Santa Barbara	United States	Arlington Theater	Neil Hamburger; Supafloss
February 16, 2007	Seattle	United States	Paramount Theatre	Neil Hamburger
February 17, 2007	Seattle	United States	Paramount Theatre	Neil Hamburger
February 19, 2007	Portland	United States	Schnitzer Auditorium	Neil Hamburger
February 20, 2007	Vancouver	Canada	Queen Elizabeth Theatre	Neil Hamburger
February 21, 2007	Vancouver	Canada	Queen Elizabeth Theatre	Neil Hamburger

== Personnel ==
This tour, unlike any other Tenacious D tour, featured a full band, as well as Lee. The band played more shows in arenas and amphitheatres, moving away from the smaller venues that dominated earlier tours. Shows also featured more elaborate stage and lighting effects. Jack Black says of the expenses of the tour: "We’re actually losing money on this because we want to do something for The Fans. It's going to be better than The Wall. It starts off in Kyle's apartment and ends up in hell."

Band

- Jack Black – lead vocals, rhythm acoustic guitar
- Kyle Gass – lead acoustic guitar, backing vocals
- John Konesky (Antichrist) – electric guitar
- John Spiker (Charlie Chaplin) – bass, backing vocals
- Brooks Wackerman (Colonel Sanders) – drums
- JR Reed (Lee) - additional vocals

== Incidents ==
- On November 24, 2006 at Chicago's UIC Pavilion, a stage-hand was seriously injured and fell off the stage whilst installing a strobe light. Paul Fire and Marine Insurance Company and The American Insurance Company both insured Tenacious D. The stagehand was assisting one of Tenacious D’s subcontractors, Ed & Ted’s Excellent Lighting Inc, and eventually settled his suit in 2014 for $1 million.
