= Rize of the Fenix Tour =

2012 concert tour by Tenacious D

- World tour by Tenacious D
- Promotional poster for European dates of the tour
- Location: North America; Europe
- Associated album: Rize of the Fenix
- Start date: May 23, 2012
- End date: October 24, 2012
- Legs: 4
- No. of shows: 45

Tenacious D concert chronology
- The Pick of Destiny Tour (2006–07); Rize of the Fenix Tour (2012); Post-Apocalypto Tour (2018–20)

The Rize of the Fenix Tour was an American and European concert tour by American rock band Tenacious D. The tour was in support of the band's 2012 album Rize of the Fenix, with the tour visiting North America and Europe. The tour began on May 23, 2012 and ended on October 24, 2012, featuring 45 shows in total. The full show performed at Rock am Ring and highlights from the performance at Rock im Park were broadcast live on German TV. Highlights from the Download Festival performance were broadcast in the UK on the Sky Arts channel. These broadcasts have since been uploaded to the Internet unofficially by YouTube users. This was the band's second major concert tour, following The Pick of Destiny Tour, which toured from late 2006 to early 2007.

In late 2015, the band auctioned the signature 'Fenix' inflatable and backdrop amongst various props and costumes to raise funds for the November 2015 Paris attacks.

== Average set list ==
1. "Rize of the Fenix"
2. "Low Hangin' Fruit
3. "Señorita"
4. "Deth Starr"
5. "Roadie"
6. "Throw Down"
7. "Sax-a-Boom"
8. "Kielbasa"
9. "Kickapoo"
10. "Dude (I Totally Miss You)"
11. "Kyle Quit the Band"
12. "Friendship"
13. "The Metal"
14. "Wonderboy"
15. "Beelzeboss (The Final Showdown)"
16. "Pinball Wizard" / "There's a Doctor" / "Go to the Mirror!" (The Who medley)
17. "Tribute"
18. "Double Team"
  Encore
19. "Baby"
20. "Fuck Her Gently"

== Internet Archive albums ==
There is one album which was released with the explicit permission of Tenacious D. This live show has been recorded and released through Internet Archive and is available for free digital download.

Date recorded	Venue	Location	Downloads
June 25, 2012	The Tabernacle	Atlanta, Georgia	305

== Tour dates ==
Date	City	Country	Venue	Opening act
Leg 1 — North America
May 23, 2012	Santa Barbara	United States	Santa Barbara Bowl	The Sights
May 24, 2012	Oakland	United States	Fox Oakland Theatre	The Sights
May 26, 2012	Bend	United States	Les Schwab Amphitheater	The Sights
May 27, 2012	Vancouver	Canada	PNE Amphitheatre	The Sights
May 28, 2012	George	United States	Sasquatch Music Festival	
Leg 2 — Europe
June 1, 2012	Nuremberg	Germany	Rock im Park Festival	
June 2, 2012	Nürburg	Germany	Rock am Ring Festival	
June 3, 2012	Amsterdam	Netherlands	Heineken Music Hall	The Bots
June 5, 2012	London	England	Brixton Academy	The Bots
June 6, 2012	London	England	Brixton Academy	The Bots
June 7, 2012	London	England	Brixton Academy	The Bots
June 9, 2012	Leicestershire	England	Download Festival	
June 10, 2012	Manchester	England	Manchester Apollo	The Bots
June 11, 2012	Glasgow	Scotland	Scottish Exhibition and Conference Centre	The Bots
Leg 3 — North America
June 23, 2012	Nashville	United States	Ryman Auditorium	The Sights
June 25, 2012	Atlanta	United States	Tabernacle	The Sights
June 26, 2012	Charlotte	United States	The Fillmore	The Sights
June 28, 2012	New York City	United States	Hammerstein Ballroom	The Sights
June 29, 2012	New York City	United States	Hammerstein Ballroom	The Sights
June 30, 2012	Philadelphia	United States	Festival Pier at Penn's Landing	The Sights and The Front Bottoms
July 2, 2012	Boston	United States	Bank of America Pavilion	The Sights
July 3, 2012	Uncasville	United States	Mohegan Sun Arena	The Sights
July 5, 2012	Toronto	Canada	Echo Beach	The Protomen
July 6, 2012	Detroit	United States	The Fillmore Detroit	The Sights
July 7, 2012	Chicago	United States	Aragon Ballroom	The Sights and Urge Overkill
July 19, 2012	Austin	United States	Austin Music Hall	The Sights
July 20, 2012	Dallas	United States	Palladium Ballroom	The Sights
July 21, 2012	Tulsa	United States	Brady Theater	The Sights
July 23, 2012	St. Louis	United States	The Pageant	The Sights
July 24, 2012	Kansas City	United States	Uptown Theater	The Sights
July 26, 2012	Morrison	United States	Red Rocks Amphitheatre	The Sights
July 28, 2012	Las Vegas	United States	House of Blues	The Sights
July 29, 2012	San Diego	United States	San Diego State University's Open Air Theater	The Sights
July 31, 2012	Los Angeles	United States	Wiltern Theatre	The Sights
Leg 4 — Europe
October 11, 2012	Munich	Germany	Zenith	The Sights
October 12, 2012	Hamburg	Germany	Alsterdorfer Sporthalle	The Sights
October 14, 2012	Düsseldorf	Germany	Mitsubishi Electric Halle	The Sights
October 15, 2012	Frankfurt	Germany	Jahrhunderthalle	The Sights
October 16, 2012	Milan	Italy	Mediolanum Forum	The Sights
October 18, 2012	Brighton	England	Brighton Centre	The Sights
October 20, 2012	Dublin	Ireland	The O2	The Sights
October 21, 2012	Wolverhampton	England	Wolverhampton Civic Hall	The Sights
October 23, 2012	Manchester	England	Manchester Apollo	The Sights
October 24, 2012	London	England	Hammersmith Apollo	The Sights

== Personnel ==
- Jack Black – lead vocals, rhythm acoustic guitar
- Kyle Gass – lead acoustic guitar, backing vocals
- John Konesky – electric guitar, backing vocals
- John Spiker – bass guitar, backing vocals
- Brooks Wackerman – drums

== Incidents ==
During the Las Vegas performance on July 28, 2012, a brawl involving a dozen or so people broke out in the crowd by the stage. A few people were pulled out and the show continued. During the incident, there was a stabbing. Police were called to the scene as it was reported by a steward. By the time the police had arrived, Tenacious D had just finished "Friendship" which was the fourteenth song out of the planned twenty-three songs. The duo quickly played "Tribute" before the venue was cleared out. The man who was stabbed recovered.
