= Tenacious D: Time Fixers =

- Directed by: Drew Hancock
- Written by: Dan Harmon
- Produced by: Kelly Kubik; Ben Cooley; Dan Harmon
- Starring: Jack Black; Kyle Gass; Michael Keaton; JR Reed; Justin Roiland; Dan Harmon; Paul F. Tompkins; Ryan Ridley
- Cinematography: Robert Brinkman
- Edited by: David Rennie
- Music by: Tenacious D
- Distributed by: iTunes; Channel 101
- Release date: 2006
- Country: United States
- Language: English

Tenacious D: Time Fixers is a short film that was used as a promotional tool on the iTunes website. The film stars Tenacious D as well as Michael Keaton and longtime collaborators JR Reed and Paul F. Tompkins. The first half of the film was available as a free download on iTunes, while the second half could only be accessed after pre-ordering the album The Pick of Destiny.

The film can also be found on YouTube, as well as the second disk of The Complete Master Works 2.

== Plot ==
At an open mic night, Tenacious D are performing "Training Medley" to an indifferent crowd, one of whom (Dan Harmon) heckles the band. After the show, they get a message from Michael Keaton as himself, saying that the time-space continuum has been disrupted in the Ford's Theater in the 1850s. After they travel there, they discover that Abraham Lincoln (Justin Roiland) has walked out of the play, which would prevent his assassination. Kyle Gass attempts to convince him to get shot and bribes him with seven cents, which he thinks must be worth a significant amount due to inflation, but Lincoln refuses. The two confront the Time Goblin (JR Reed) who staged the scenario so he could confront Tenacious D and take their "time machine" (a normal-looking car with time-travel capabilities, much like the DeLorean time machine). They fight, and the Time Goblin wins. He ties them into the presidential party box, so that John Wilkes Booth will assassinate them instead, and steals their time machine. The two break free and discover Lincoln is willing to get shot, since he discovered from Kyle's seven cents his face is on the future penny and is grateful. Jack and Kyle realize they still do not have a time machine, but meet H.G. Wells, who offers them the use of the time machine from his book and they leave with it.

The Time Goblin, in prehistoric times, is about to kill a butterfly to distort the future when Jack and Kyle arrive and beat him, presumably to death. Before they go back to the present, they travel into the future and pay a visit to the grave of the heckler from before, and take a photo of themselves in front of the headstone, which they take back to the present and show to the heckler before he can voice his insult.
