= Supafloss =

American comedy rap duo

Supafloss, an American comedy rap duo, was created in 2000 in Los Angeles by actors Michael Rivkin (Grotzy Redoodyhouse) and Kirk Ward (Mister Twister). They were discovered by the band Tenacious D, and have since opened for Tenacious D at a variety of venues such as the House of Blues, The Viper Room and more recently The Gibson Amphitheatre in Los Angeles and Madison Square Garden in New York. Supafloss has also opened for the popular band Ozomatli at the House of Blues.

Rivkin and Jack Black met in college at UCLA. Together they joined the theatre group, "The Actor's Gang" in Los Angeles. They met Kyle Gass, and eventually Kirk Ward. Both Rivkin and Ward have had extensive acting careers. Rivkin, raised in New York City, landed his first acting gig at the age of 10 working with Willem Dafoe and Spalding Gray in the "Wooster Group," the world-renowned experimental theatre company. Ward, born and raised in Hollister, CA, at the age of 19 was cast by the esteemed Latino comedy troupe, Culture Clash, for their TV sketch comedy show.

Supafloss is most known for their song and music video, "Chuck Norris," starring Chris Parnell as Chuck Norris. The music video also stars Jack Black, John C. Reilly and Kathryn Morris. Chris Parnell also raps on the Supafloss song, "This Is Who We Are."
