= Trainwreck with Kyle Gass =

American rock band

Background information
- Origin: Los Angeles, California, United States
- Genres: Hard rock, southern rock, heavy metal, comedy rock
- Years active: 2002–2010, 2018–present
- Labels: Epic, Jojo Entertainment, Space Horse
- Members: Darryl Donald (JR Reed); Klip Calhoun (Kyle Gass); John Bartholomew Shredman (John Konesky); Boy Johnny (John Spiker)
- Website: kylegass.com/trainwreck

Trainwreck with Kyle Gass is an American rock band formed in Los Angeles, in 2002. It was founded by Tenacious D guitarist Kyle Gass and actor and singer JR Reed.

The band originally started out as a three-piece, with Reed on vocals, Gass on guitar, and Kevin Weisman on drums. The band adopted pseudonym names for its band members: Reed was "Darryl Lee Donald", Gass was "Klip Calhoun", and Weisman was "Kenny Bob Thornton". Gass and Reed began to search for backing musicians, as they felt Trainwreck's musical style was "too close to Tenacious D". The band met electric guitarist John Konesky and bassist John Spiker in Ohio through a mutual friend, with them relocating to Los Angeles to form Trainwreck as "John Bartholomew Shredman" and "Boy Johnny" respectively. Nate Rothacker replaced Weisman as the drummer in the mid-2000s, going under the pseudonym "Dallas St. Bernard".

The band released one studio album, one live album, one EP and two singles before splitting up in 2010. The band would reform in 2018 and announce a reunion tour, as well as work on a second studio album, releasing some singles in 2022.

== History ==
=== Beginnings ===
Gass started the rock band Tenacious D along with Jack Black in 1994. Black became very popular in the turn of the new millennium with many film and TV roles which led to Black having less time to spend playing gigs with Gass – so Gass created Trainwreck to keep him musically active when Black was busy. In December 2001, Tenacious D played a concert with Weezer and Jimmy Eat World in Value City Arena, where Kyle Gass befriended Erin Robinson, who described herself as a "huge D fan". In 2002, Trainwreck was formed, but just as an occasional band with JR Reed on vocals, Kevin Weisman on drums and Gass as guitar. The group played their first concert at Highland Grounds in Los Angeles on August 2, 2002. In 2003, Gass asked Erin Robinson to recruit electric backing musicians for the "Trainwreck side project" so she found bassist John Spiker and electric guitarist John Konesky. At this point, Gass, Reed and Weisman also added Chris D'Arienzo as keyboard in addition. The band released their first single '2 Tracks' sometime in 2003 and their live album, Trainwreck Live, was released by Epic Records in 2004 exclusive to their ShopBootlegs.com. Trainwreck made their first TV appearance on Jimmy Kimmel Live in 2004 and featured on Current TV's 2005 Halloween special performing "TV Theme" as the musical guest.

=== The EP (2006–2007) ===
The band self-released their first 5-song EP, The EP, in 2006. Two songs from the EP ("Caveman" and "I Wanna Know") were used on the official soundtrack for Tenacious D in The Pick of Destiny, and were later released on More Rocktastic Music From The Film. Gass wears a Trainwreck T-shirt during the vast majority of the film, as well as appearing in it on posters. For the concert tour to support the movie and soundtrack, Konesky and Spiker were recruited to play guitar for the shows based on their work with Trainwreck. Rothacker worked as a band assistant. Because The Pick of Destiny Tour featured all the members of Trainwreck, Trainwreck played shows in the cities they were in on their days off. This is notable because the band performed at the Scala in England, the Annandale Hotel in Australia and the Mod Club Theater in Canada which were the band's first international dates. In late 2006, Black expressed wishes for 2007 to take a break from the entertainment industry, this meant for Trainwreck to tour during 2007, especially in the summer, to keep Gass musically active.

=== The Wreckoning (2008–2010) ===
In September 2008, Trainwreck released their first music video "Tim Blankenship" directed by Nick Simon. The actual song itself would later feature on their 2009 debut album.

The band released their debut 15-track album on December 2, 2009 at The Roxy in Los Angeles. There was also a music video created in support for the album – "Brodeo". The band also released a music video for "Baby, Let's Rock" off of Trainwreck's 2003 "2 Tracks" single. The band went on a tour to support the new album throughout March and May in various cities of the United States. In June during Tenacious D's Bonnaroo Music Festival slot, Rothacker played for Tenacious D for the first time as he replaced Brooks Wackerman due to him being on tour with Bad Religion. Later on, in September, they began touring again after a short absence. The band played their last show on September 25, 2010 at the Beat Kitchen in Chicago. This show was in the middle of their Transcontinental Railroad tour – the Chicago show was their tenth show into the tour, and due to "unforeseen circumstances" the band cancelled the remainder of their tour. After five months of in-activity, in March 2011, they announced their closure on their Facebook page as Gass, Konesky and Rothacker formed Kyle Gass Band.

=== Reunion (2018–present) ===
The band reunited at a Wynchester show (which features Konesky) at the Maui Sugar Mill Saloon on February 2, 2018, making a short on-stage appearance. This was due to both Gass and Reed being in attendance at the show, also Spiker performing with Wynchester as a guest. The drumming position in the band was filled with Wynchester's Matt Lesser, instead of Nate Rothacker. A couple of days after this, the band announced a show on their Facebook page at DiPiazza's in Long Beach, California for February 24, opening for Kyle Gass Band. This show being a full-band reunion with Rothacker on drums. In April, the band posted a photo of themselves in a recording studio on their Facebook and Instagram pages. The band also announced a September tour – playing nine dates throughout California. A few dates after the announcement of the tour, the band revealed they were working on a second studio album.

In July 2020, the band made a virtual appearance for Rootstock Music Festival, and in August 2020, the band made an appearance for Stand Up For America.

In early 2022, the band released a lyric video for a new song "Commin' in Hot" as well as an audio recording of another new song, "Can't, Got the Lady". A series of West Coast tour dates were announced as well, however only a handful were played in the end due to COVID-19 issues. The band also cancelled what would have been their first European tour due to COVID-19 complications.

In the summer of 2022, the band celebrated their 20th anniversary with a countdown on their social media.

== Band members ==
- Darryl Lee Donald (JR Reed) – lead vocals, percussion (2002–2010, 2018–present)
- Klip Calhoun (Kyle Gass) – acoustic guitar, backing vocals, flute (2002–2010, 2018–present)
- John Bartholomew Shredman (John Konesky) – guitars (2003–2010, 2018–present)
- Boy Johnny (John Spiker) – bass, vocals (2003–2010, 2018–present)

Former members

- Slim Redmond (Steve McDonald) – bass (2002–2003)
- Kenny Bob Thornton (Kevin Weisman) – drums (2002–2004)
- Lance Branson (Chris D'Arienzo) – keyboard, vocals (2003–2006)
- Dallas St. Bernard (Nate Rothacker) – drums (2004–2010, 2018)

Touring musicians

- T-Bone MacGruthers (Tim Spier) – drums (2018)
- Gordon Rimsey (Eric Jackowitz) – drums (2022)

Timeline

== Discography ==
Studio albums

- The Wreckoning (2009)

Live albums

- Trainwreck Live (2004)

Extended plays

- 2 Tracks (2003) (later re-released as "2 Wreck-n-Roll Tracks")
- The EP (2006)
- Trainwreck (2006)
