= Kyle Gass Band =

American rock band

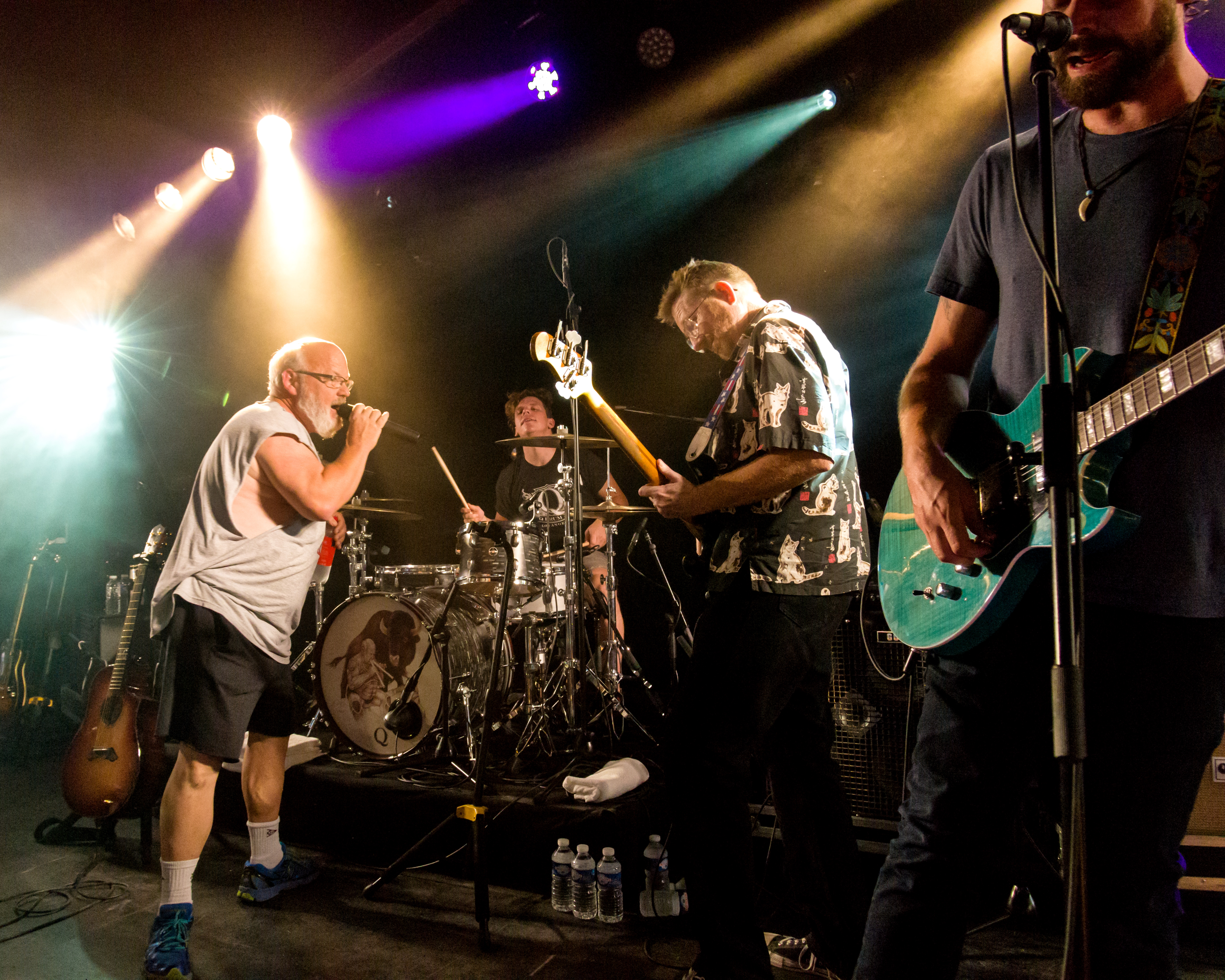
- Kyle Gass Band performing at Zelt-Musik-Festival in 2017

Background information
- Also known as: KGB; The Kyle Gass Company
- Origin: Los Angeles, California, U.S.
- Genres: Rock
- Years active: 2011–present
- Labels: Steamhammer, Aspecialthing
- Members: Mike Bray; Kyle Gass; John Konesky; Jason Keene; Tim Spier
- Past members: Nate Rothacker; Jamie Douglass
- Website: kylegass.com/band

Kyle Gass Band (KGB) is an American rock band formed in Los Angeles, California in 2011. The band is fronted by Tenacious D lead guitarist Kyle Gass and vocalist and guitarist Mike Bray. The backing band consists of electric guitarist John Konesky, bassist Jason Keene, and drummer Tim Spier. The band have released two studio albums, Kyle Gass Band (2013) and Thundering Herd (2016).

The band also occasionally tours acoustically (without Keene and Spier) as The Kyle Gass Company.

== History ==
=== Background ===
Gass and Jack Black formed the band Tenacious D in 1994 whilst they were members of The Actors' Gang theater company in Los Angeles. Black's popularity as an actor began to increase in the early 2000s, with appearances in films such as High Fidelity, Saving Silverman and Shallow Hal. These appearances meant that Black was unable to dedicate as much time with Gass for Tenacious D, causing Gass to form the side-project Trainwreck in 2002. In the summer of 2010, the lead singer of Trainwreck, JR Reed, was unable to make a party Gass had been invited to play, causing Gass to form a one-off band called Kyle Gass' Falcon, an early version of what would become the Kyle Gass Band. Trainwreck later split in 2011, causing Gass to form a new project.

=== Formation and beginnings (2011–2013) ===
Gass and Konesky were both of Tenacious D and former members of Trainwreck. Mike Bray was hand-selected by Gass to front the Kyle Gass Band. Mike came to Los Angeles from Mahomet, Illinois in 2007 and formed "Band of Bigfoot", where each band member dressed up as bigfoot. After doing some shows in the Pacific Northwest opening for Trainwreck in 2009 and '10, Gass noticed talent in Bray, and invited him to be the lead vocalist. Bassist Jason Keene was picked for the group, an old friend of Gass. The drumming position in the band was originally filled by Trainwreck's Nate Rothacker until mid-2013, it was then given to Jamie Douglass in late-2013 and then Tim Spier in mid-2014.

The band recorded their first material throughout 2011 and some recordings in 2012, with their self-titled debut album releasing independently in July 2013. The album was re-released on SPV GmbH in April 2015 for Europe. In June 2015, the band released their first music video for "Our Job to Rock" with the Jash Network. In September 2016, their second album, Thundering Herd was released in Europe, and in November 2016 worldwide.

=== Touring (2011–present) ===
The band played their first gig at the 2011 NAMM Show opening for Mike Campbell in early January. They played their first independent show at DiPiazza's in Los Angeles on June 18, 2011. The band would tour Europe regularly in the mid-2010s.

In February 2025, the band announced an acoustic The Kyle Gass Company tour across Europe in May, including their debut in Ireland.

In January 2026, the band announced they would release their first live album, Live in Palmdale, through Aspecialthing Records.

== Band members ==
- Mike Bray – lead vocals, guitar (2011–present)
- Kyle Gass – lead acoustic guitar, vocals, flute (2011–present)
- John Konesky – lead electric guitar, backing vocals (2011–present)
- Jason Keene – bass, harmonica (2011–present)
- Tim Spier – drums (2014–present)

=== Former members ===
- Nate Rothacker – drums (2011–2013)
- Jamie Douglass – drums (2013–2014)

=== Former touring member ===
- Jokin Salaverria – bass (2014)

== Discography ==
Studio albums

- Kyle Gass Band (2013)
- Thundering Herd (2016)

Live albums

- Live in Palmdale (2026)
