= Wieners (film) =

- DVD cover
- Directed by: Mark Steilen
- Written by: Suzanne Francis and Gabe Grifoni
- Starring: Fran Kranz; Kenan Thompson; Jenny McCarthy; Darrel Hammond
- Music by: David Kitay
- Production company: Destination Films
- Distributed by: Sony Pictures Home Entertainment
- Release date: June 3, 2008
- Country: United States
- Language: English

Wieners is a 2008 American comedy film starring Kenan Thompson, Darrell Hammond, and Zachary Levi. Directed by Mark Steilen, it also stars Fran Kranz and Jenny McCarthy. It was written by Suzanne Francis and Gabe Grifoni.

== Plot ==
Joel's girlfriend breaks up with him on the advice of abusive television therapist Dr. Dwayne. His two friends, Wyatt and Ben, take Joel on a road trip in Wyatt's van to lift his spirits and take revenge on Dr. Dwayne. In hopes of getting a job with Oscar Mayer, Wyatt has customized his van into a cross-country hotdog stand called the Weiner Wagon.

On the road trip, they encounter several outrageous characters and have silly adventures. As they approach their destination, Joel abandons his friends in a fit of hopelessness, winding up drunk in a back alley. His childhood tormenter, Drake Hanswald, appears in a hallucination, and Joel watches helplessly as his younger self is tormented by Drake and all of his other classmates. Realizing that he needs to change his situation and stand up for himself, Joel returns to his friends just in time to save them from the hippies who had previously stolen Wyatt's hood ornament.

The next morning, they sneak into the studio where Dr. Dwayne's show is filmed. After beating up Dr. Dwayne's decoy, the real Dr. Dwayne appears, revealing that he intentionally caused Joel's breakup to motivate Joel to take a stand for himself. He also reveals that he has found a rich man that Wyatt had saved from a life of drugs, who is willing to finance Wyatt's Wieners. Ben makes a speech to the audience and accepts his homosexuality.

Now that the friends have all achieved what they needed, they head home, and we learn that Wyatt's Wieners became a popular pre-packaged meat company in the U.S. Wyatt now lives in a hotdog-shaped house with his dachshund Beyoncé. Ben went on to become a lawyer and cologne designer who currently lives with his "roommate" Johnathan and their two cats. Joel invented pants which cannot be yanked down, and the three friends take the Wiener Wagon on a road trip every year to spread cross-country happiness.

== Cast ==
- Fran Kranz as Joel Cooper
- Kenan Thompson as Wyatt Fabio Goldstein
- Zachary Levi as Ben Fallon
- Darrell Hammond as Dr. Dwayne
- Jenny McCarthy as Ms. Rebecca Isaac
- Andy Milonakis as Drake Hanswald/Timmy O'Shamus
- Mindy Sterling as Mrs. Frank Applebaum
- Blake Clark as Mr. Felicia Applebaum
- Joel Moore as Greg King
- Kyle Gass as Walrus Boy
- Sarah Drew as Karen Kemper
- John Farley as Cornelius Worthington III
- Sarah Wright as Lavender (credited as Sarah Mason)
- Chris Pratt as Bobby
