= Embedded (play) =

Embedded is a play starring, written, and directed by Tim Robbins. It premiered at The Actors' Gang theater in Los Angeles 2003 and transferred to The Public Theater in New York in 2004, where it was staged at its Newman Theater. The play chronicles the war in Iraq through satire and commedia dell'arte masks. It also pokes fun at neo-conservatives such as Karl Rove, Condoleezza Rice, Dick Cheney, and Donald Rumsfeld.

The play was recorded in June 2004 and was broadcast on the Sundance Channel in August 2005.

== Original cast ==
Cast members included:

- Tim Robbins – Sarge and Cove
- V.J. Foster – Hardchannel and Announcer
- Brent Hinkley – Rum Rum and Chip Webb
- Jay R. Martinez – Ramon and Camera Kid
- Kate Mulligan – Maryanne, Woof and Gwen
- Steven M. Porter – Jen's Dad, Dick and Buford T
- Lolly Ward – Jen's Mom, Amy Constant and Woof
- Benjamin J. Cain Jr. – Monk
- Kailie Hollister – Jen Jen Ryan
- Riki Lindhome – Gondola and Journalist
- Andrew Wheeler – Pearly White and Stringer
- Mark Lewis (New York) / Nathan Kornelis (London) – Lieutenant and Journalist
