= The Pick of Destiny =

2006 studio album by Tenacious D

Studio album / Soundtrack album by Tenacious D
- Released: November 14, 2006
- Recorded: March–July 2005
- Studios: The Dell and 606 Studio
- Genres: Comedy rock; hard rock; heavy metal
- Length: 33:46
- Label: Epic
- Producer: John King

Tenacious D chronology
D Fun Pak (2002)	The Pick of Destiny (2006)	Rize of the Fenix (2012)

Singles from The Pick of Destiny
- 1. "POD" Released: October 24, 2006

Professional ratings
Aggregate scores
Source	Rating
Metacritic	52/100
Review scores
Source	Rating
AllMusic	3.5/5 stars
Blender	2/5 stars
Entertainment Weekly	B+
The Guardian	3/5 stars
IGN	8.4/10
musicOMH	3/5 stars
Rolling Stone	2.5/5 stars
Slant Magazine	1/5 stars
Spin	5/10
Sputnikmusic	4/5

The Pick of Destiny is the second studio album and the soundtrack for the feature film of the same name by American comedy rock band Tenacious D. The album was released on November 14, 2006, through Epic Records, and debuted at number 8 on the Billboard 200.

The Pick of Destiny is the band's first studio release in five years, following up their self-titled debut album in 2001. The album was produced by the Dust Brothers' John King, and includes appearances by Meat Loaf, Ronnie James Dio, and Dave Grohl. Another album, More Rocktastic Music from the Film, contains some small excerpts of the official score that the soundtrack excludes.

== Details ==
In the absence of original comedy skits, there are excerpts of dialogue from the soundtrack's accompanying film between numerous songs. Portions of The Pick of Destiny were recorded at Dave Grohl's studio. A clean version of the album was recorded.

The album was released in three separate edits: the original version comprising the full film versions, a "clean edit" with re-recorded vocals replacing foul language with non-sense words, and a deluxe edition. All three versions contain clips from the movie, but some dialogue was re-recorded for the clean version. The special limited edition was released in a cardboard "old book case", which includes a digipack version of the album, a foldout poster depicting Black and Gass with bigfoot, eight tarot cards from the film (Tenacious D, The Training, Destiny, Masterpiece, The Quest, The Divide, and Two Kings, as well as a card explaining the other cards), and a plastic replica of The Pick of Destiny. If the set was pre-ordered from the Tenacious D website, it also included a T-shirt.

In recent years the song “Kickapoo” has become the unofficial fight song of Kickapoo High School, located in Springfield Missouri. In the music video to the song it shows how they are referring to “Kickapoo” in Missouri, it is unknown if this is referring to the area that the high school is in because there is no town or township in Missouri with the name Kickapoo. This also could come from inspiration from Brad Pitt, Kickapoo High School Alumn and friend of Jack Black frontman of Tenacious D.

== Album art ==
The cover shows Black and Gass in the clouds, parodying Michelangelo's painting The Creation of Adam. In between the two's hands is the Pick of Destiny, the movie's titular artifact, with the devil's arm pictured below them, sticking out from the clouds trying to take the pick.

Apart from the exemption of the parental advisory sticker, there is no difference in the artwork for the clean version of the album.

== Publicity ==
A short film entitled Time Fixers was used as a promotional tool on the iTunes website. The film starred Michael Keaton and longtime collaborators JR Reed and Paul F. Tompkins. The first half of the film was available as a free download on iTunes while the second half could only be accessed after pre-ordering the album.

== Track listing ==
All tracks are written by Jack Black and Kyle Gass, except where noted.

No.	Title	Writer(s)	Length
1.	"Kickapoo" (featuring Meat Loaf and Ronnie James Dio)	Black; Gass; Liam Lynch	4:14
2.	"Classico"	Black; Gass; Johann Sebastian Bach; Ludwig van Beethoven; Wolfgang Amadeus Mozart	0:58
3.	"Baby"		1:36
4.	"Destiny" (extract from movie)		0:37
5.	"History"		1:42
6.	"The Government Totally Sucks" (featuring JR Reed)		1:34
7.	"Master Exploder"		2:24
8.	"The Divide" (extract from movie)		0:22
9.	"Papagenu (He's My Sassafrass)" (featuring John C. Reilly)	Black; Gass; John King	2:24
10.	"Dude (I Totally Miss You)"		2:53
11.	"Break In-City (Storm the Gate!)"	Black; Gass; King; Lynch	1:22
12.	"Car Chase City" (featuring Paul F. Tompkins)	Gass	2:42
13.	"Beelzeboss (The Final Showdown)" (featuring Dave Grohl)	Black; Gass; Dave Grohl; Lynch	5:35
14.	"POD"		2:32
15.	"The Metal"	Black; Gass; Konesky	2:45
Total length:			33:40

Bonus tracks
No.	Title	Length
16.	"Rock Your Socks" (Acoustic version, iTunes pre-order bonus track)	3:07
17.	"Training Medley" (Digital Download available with Best Buy version, streaming bonus track, also available on "POD" single, and the Japanese version)	1:11
18.	"Kong" (Japanese bonus track, streaming bonus track, also available on "POD" 7" single)	3:21
19.	"It's Late" (Digital download bonus track available from the eight year re-issue vinyl MP3 download card)	1:34
Total length:		43:20

== Personnel ==
Tenacious D

- Jack Black – lead vocals, acoustic guitar
- Kyle Gass – backing vocals, acoustic and electric guitar, recorder on "Papagenu (He's My Sassafrass)"

Additional musicians

- Dave Grohl – drums, demon vocals on "Beelzeboss (The Final Showdown)"
- John Konesky – electric guitar
- Meat Loaf – guest vocals on "Kickapoo"
- John C. Riley – guest vocals on "Papagenu (He's My Sassafrass)"
- Ronnie James Dio – guest vocals on "Kickapoo"
- John Spiker – bass guitar, backing vocals on "Car Chase City", clavinet on "Papagenu (He's My Sassafrass)"
- Liam Lynch – additional guitar on "Beelzeboss (The Final Showdown)" and "Break In-City (Storm the Gate!)"
- John King – drum programming on "Papagenu (He's My Sassafrass)"

Production

- Produced by John King
- Assistant engineers: Ed Cherney, Nick Raskulinecz, John Spiker, Brad Breeck
- Recorded at The Dell and Studio 606
- Mixed by Ken Andrews
- Mastered by Tom Baker at Precision Mastering
- Orchestral arrangements by Andrew Gross, recorded at Sony Scoring Stage, engineered by Casey Stone
- Baritone saxophone and piano on "Kickapoo" recorded at Capitol Studios, engineered by Casey Stone
- Management: Sam
- A&R: Matt Marshall
- Music executive: Bob Bowen
- Photography: Michael Elins
- Album packaging design by: Gregg Higgins/Michael Elins

== Charts ==
=== Weekly charts ===
Chart (2006–07)	Peak position
Australian Albums (ARIA)	35
Austrian Albums (Ö3 Austria)	64
Canadian Albums (Nielsen SoundScan)	64
Dutch Alternative Albums (MegaCharts)	29
German Albums (Offizielle Top 100)	47
Irish Albums (IRMA)	9
Scottish Albums (Official Charts)	9
Swedish Albums (Sverigetopplistan)	44
Swiss Albums (Schweizer Hitparade)	82
UK Albums (Official Charts)	10
UK Rock & Metal Albums (Official Charts)	2
UK Soundtrack Albums (OCC)	2
US Billboard 200	8
US Top Rock Albums (Billboard)	1
US Soundtrack Albums (Billboard)	2

=== Year-end charts ===
Chart (2006)	Position
UK Albums (OCC)	172

Chart (2007)	Position
US Billboard 200	200
US Soundtrack Albums (Billboard)	12

== Certifications ==
Region	Certification	Certified units/sales
Austria (IFPI Austria)	Gold	15,000^{*}
Ireland (IRMA)	Platinum	15,000^{^}
United Kingdom (BPI)	Platinum	300,000^{‡}
^{*} Sales figures based on certification alone.^{^} Shipments figures based on certification alone.^{‡} Sales+streaming figures based on certification alone.

== More Rocktastic Music from the Film ==
More Rocktastic Music from the Film

Film score by John King, Andrew Gross and Trainwreck
- Released: February 27, 2007
- Recorded: Sony Scoring Stage
- Genres: Soundtrack, classical, comedy rock, folk rock, acoustic rock
- Length: 15:36
- Label: New Line
- Producers: John King and Andrew Gross

More Rocktastic Music from the Film is a score album by Andrew Gross and John King for the movie Tenacious D in The Pick of Destiny. It was exclusive to Wal-Mart stores, coming shrink-wrapped with the DVD. The score consists of six orchestral songs written specifically to accompany the film, and two songs by Kyle Gass' band Trainwreck.

=== Track listing ===
All songs were written by Andrew Gross and John King, except where noted.

1. "The Birth of the D" – 1:26
2. "Compared to the Greats" – 0:43
3. "The Stranger Suite" – 1:44
4. "Guitarway to Heaven" – 0:51
5. "Hall of Fame Sneak" – 2:15
6. "Capturing the Pick" – 1:03
7. "Caveman" – 3:53 (Trainwreck)
8. "I Wanna Know" – 3:41 (Trainwreck)
