= JR Reed (actor) =

American actor

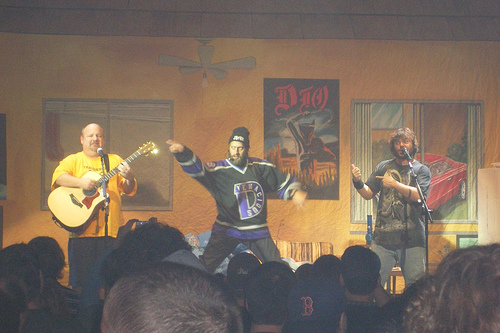

Background information
- Birth name: Jason William Reed
- Born: December 13, 1967 (age 57); Corvallis, Oregon, U.S.
- Occupation(s): Actor, singer
- Years active: 1991–present

JR Reed (born December 13, 1967, as Jason William Reed) is an American character actor and singer, originally from Corvallis, Oregon. He is best known for his roles as "Lee" with American rock band Tenacious D, mainly in their television series and in their 2006 film The Pick of Destiny, as well as featuring at live concerts. He would also form the band Trainwreck with Kyle Gass in 2002 alongside Tenacious D guitarist Kyle Gass, performing as the lead singer. Trainwreck broke up in 2010, though reformed in 2018. Outside of these appearances, Reed mainly features in sporadic television, web-series and film appearances, as well as in commercial work.

== Early and personal life ==
Reed was born in Corvallis, Oregon, though grew up in Las Vegas, where he graduated from Bonanza High School. He moved to L.A after graduating, where he currently lives and worked as a handyman, before attending UCLA School of Theater, Film and Television.

== Career ==
=== Acting and music ===
Reed enrolled in the UCLA School of Theater, Film and Television in 1987 and graduated in 1991. He joined Tim Robbins' The Actors' Gang and his first production with the group was the Good Woman of Setzuan. JR met Kyle Gass and knew Jack Black from UCLA previously, which led him to getting hired as a roadie and playing Spider-Man at early Tenacious D concerts. In 1996, Reed starred in his first film, The Shot. His Actors' Gang production "Kick Ass Militia" won the Backstage West Play Production of the Year award in 1997. In 1999, JR starred in Buffy the Vampire Slayer and in 2000 featured in Tenacious D's TV series as "Lee". In 2001, Reed made appearances in Dead Last and The Anniversary Party. In 2002, JR started a side-project band with Gass called Trainwreck with Kyle Gass. He can also be seen on The Complete Master Works Tenacious D concert DVD.

In 2005, Reed featured in a television special of Alias as well as having a part in Living with Fran. In 2006, Reed featured in Tenacious D in the Pick of Destiny, taking on the role of Lee, and played the "Time Goblin" in the 2006 short film Tenacious D: Time Fixers. He also went on the world tour to support the album as "Satan" and "The Metal" amongst other roles, he would continue these roles at summer festivals a couple of years later, such as Reading and Leeds festivals 2008 and Outside Lands in 2009. He can be seen on The Complete Master Works 2. In late 2009, Reed featured in the viral thanksgiving video, "The Sexy Pilgrim" and in 2010 Reed featured in Remington's "Keep It Hairy". In 2013, Reed featured as the lead role in "Campus Security", an Internet series, as well as featuring in an episode of Community. In 2014, Reed featured in Nickelodeon's Henry Danger. In 2015, he made his international film debut in the Danish film Klown Forever as himself and the Battle Cat. In the fall of 2015, Reed's signature "The Metal" costume, used on the 2006–2007 world tour, was put on auction by Tenacious D in support of Josh Homme's Sweet Stuff Foundation, to raise funds for the victims and families of the November 2015 Paris attacks. In 2016, Reed featured in Black-ish as a substitute teacher.

=== Commercial work ===
Reed's career includes commercial work for Time Warner, Microsoft, TiVO, Carl's Jr, Hardee's, Taco Bell, Silk Soy Milk, Tanqueray, Volkswagen, Planter's Nuts and Castrol Motor Oil. His most notable lead role in McDonald's "The Fish Is Back" Filet-O-Fish commercial went viral in between 2008 and 2010. He has also featured in Remington's "Keep it Hairy" and in Muscle Milk's "The Sexy Pilgrim" music videos, both of which feature Reed as the lead role. More recently, Reed featured in a commercial for hotels.com. In 2015, Reed featured in commercials for Rite Aid promoting flu treatment.

== Appearances ==
=== Film ===
Year	Title	Role	Notes
1996	The Shot	Police Officer	
1996	Scream, Teen, Scream!	Tony	
2000	Camera Obscura	Bouncer	
2001	Frank's Book	Stoney Friend	
2001	The Anniversary Party	Party Guest	
2003	The Pick Up	Mick The Bartender	
2003	Humanoid	Mullet Man	
2003	Johnny Kazoo	Johnny Kazoo	
2005	Captain Lou Albano's Birthday Slam	Hulk Hogan	
2006	Tenacious D in the Pick of Destiny	Lee	
2007	What Ever Happened to Gavin Buckmaster?	Randy	
2008	Kung Fu Panda	JR Shaw	
2008	The 7th Claus	Coop	
2009	Other People's Parties	Duane DuFresne	
2009	Addicted to Facebook	Group Leader	
2010	Removal	Mike	
2010	Errand_boy	Bo	
2015	Klown Forever	JR / Battle Cat	

=== Television and web series ===
Year	Title	Role	Notes
1999	Buffy the Vampire Slayer	Guard	Episode: Choices
2000	Tenacious D	Lee	Episode: The Fan
2001	Dead Last	Tom Trevino	Episode: Laughlin It Up
2005	Living with Fran	Rocker Dude	Episode: The Concert
2005	Alias	Lead CIA Agent	Episode: Authorized Personnel Only: Part 2
2006	Friday Night with Jonathan Ross	Satan (Tenacious D)	Series 11, Episode 14 (December 15, 2006)
2006	American Music Awards	Satan (Tenacious D)	
2006	Saturday Night Live	The Metal (Tenacious D)	Series 32, Episode 7 (December 2, 2006)
2006	Spike Video Game Awards	The Metal (Tenacious D)	
2007	Jimmy Kimmel Live	Satan (Tenacious D)	Series 5, Episode 24 (February 9, 2007)
2008	Spike Video Game Awards	The Anti-Video Game Devil	
2013	Campus Security	Karl Thompson	
2013	Community	Inspector Spacetime	Episode: Conventions of Space and Time
2014	Henry Danger	Ortho's Father	Episode: Jasper Danger
2016	Black-ish	Mr. Sheffield	Episode: Twindependence
2016	Bizaardvark	Horse Face Guy's Father	Episode: Agh, Humburg
2016	Just Add Magic	Mr. Kramer	Episode: Just Add Betrayal
2016	Joy Jacobs: First Bite	Archetype Vampire	
