= The Actors' Gang =

Theatre organization

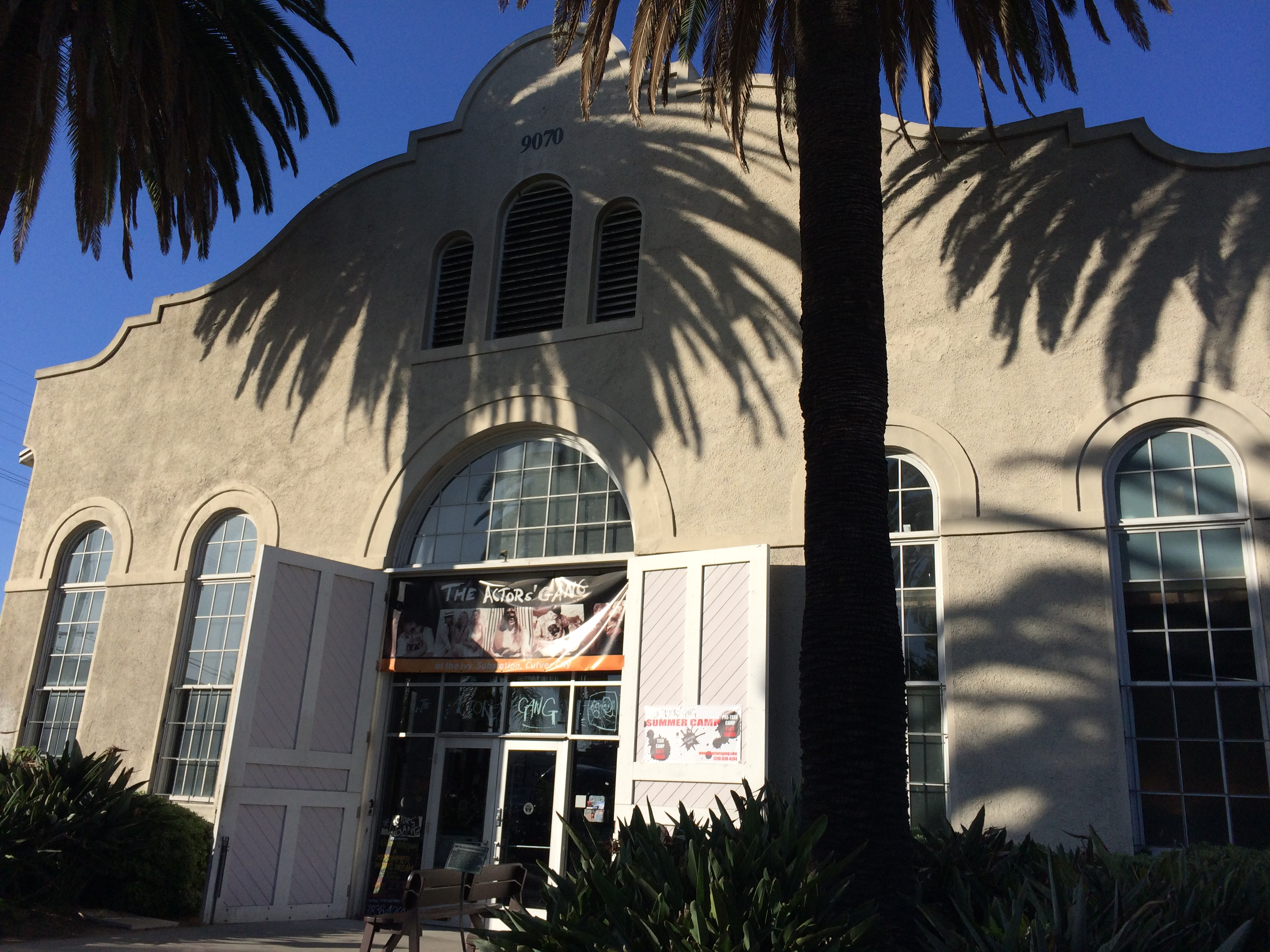
- Actors' Gang at Ivy Substation in Media Park, Culver City, California
- Formation: 1981; 45 years ago
- Type: Theatre group
- Location: Culver City, California, United States
- Artistic director: Tim Robbins
- Website: theactorsgang.com

The Actors' Gang is an experimental theatre and nonprofit group based at the Ivy Substation in Culver City, California. It was founded in 1981 by a group of actors, including Tim Robbins, now a member of the board and artistic director of the troupe.

== History ==
The Actors' Gang has produced more than 150 plays in Los Angeles, in forty US states, and on five continents. The company was founded in 1981 by a group of young artists. Tim Robbins is the founding artistic director.

The Actors' Gang has presented the work of theater artists including Georges Bigot, Simon Abkarian, Charles L. Mee, David Schweizer, Bill Rauch and the Cornerstone Theatre Company, Tracy Young, Roger Guenveur Smith, Eric Bogosian, Oskar Eustis, Danny Hoch, Beth Milles, Jon Kellam, Brian Kulick, Stefan Haves, Namaste Theater Company, Culture Clash, JR Reed, Michael Schlitt, and Tenacious D.

The Actors' Gang ensemble has included actors such as Jack Black, John Cusack, John C. Reilly, Helen Hunt, Kate Walsh, Fisher Stevens, Jeremy Piven, Ebbe Roe Smith, Jon Favreau, Ned Bellamy, Lauren Lane, Brent Hinkley, Kate Mulligan, Lee Arenberg, Kyle Gass, and Tim Robbins.

Guest artists that have appeared on The Actors' Gang stage include: Jackson Browne, Sarah Silverman, Ben Gibbard, John Doe, Tom Morello, Jenny Lewis, Wayne Kramer, Paul Provenza, Zooey Deschanel, Serj Tankian, David Crosby, Felicity Huffman, Jill Sobule, William H. Macy, Philip Baker Hall, Jeanne Tripplehorn, Durga McBroom, T. C. Boyle, and Gore Vidal.

== Community outreach ==
The Actors' Gang Education and Outreach Program provides free after-school, in-school, and summer programs for Los Angeles County youth. Company actors/teaching artists work in collaboration with youth to create original ensemble theatre.

The Actors' Gang Prison Project provides eight-week workshops in California prisons in order to unlock human potential in the interest of effective rehabilitation. One of the few remaining arts programs inside California's correctional system. Since the program's inception 8 years ago, the Prison Project maintains a 0% recidivism rate (California's rate exceeds 60%).

Other community outreach programs include weekly pay-what-you-can performances (every Thursday's performance during all production runs) and free Shakespeare-in-the-Park every weekend in August (a 45-minute Shakespeare adaptation for all ages). The Actors' Gang contributes ticket vouchers for group trips and non-profit fundraising activities.

== Productions ==
In 2014, the Actors' Gang toured its production of William Shakespeare's A Midsummer Night's Dream, directed by Tim Robbins. The tour schedule included:

- Beijing – Centre for the Performing Arts, China, June 2014
- Shanghai – Daguan Theatre, Shanghai Zendai Himalayas Arts Centre, China, June 2014
- Spoleto – Spoleto Festival, Italy, July 2014
- Los Angeles – Ivy Substation (home of The Actors' Gang), California, USA, July and August 2014
- Nashville – OZ Arts, Tennessee, USA, September 2014
- Porto Alegre – Porto Alegre Em Cena, Brazil, September 2014

Other touring productions include George Orwell's 1984, Tartuffe, Embedded, The Trial of the Catonsville Nine, The Guys, and The Exonerated. These productions have toured 41 states in the U.S. and cities across the world from London to Athens, Madrid, Barcelona, Bogota, Hong Kong, Melbourne, and Buenos Aires, covering five continents.

== Training ==
Actor training courses are held at the theater several times a year in eight-week periods.

== The Style ==
The Style is a unique form of acting developed at the Actors' Gang over its many year history. It includes elements of commedia dell'arte, mask work, viewpoints, and focuses on developing emotional states. Every show at the Actors Gang utilizes the Style in varying degrees of subtlety.
