= Tenacious D in The Pick of Destiny =

2006 film by Liam Lynch

- Theatrical release poster
- Directed by: Liam Lynch
- Written by: Jack Black; Kyle Gass; Liam Lynch
- Produced by: Jack Black; Kyle Gass; Stuart Cornfeld; Lauren Ashwell
- Starring: Jack Black; Kyle Gass
- Cinematography: Robert Brinkmann
- Edited by: David Rennie
- Music by: Tenacious D; Andrew Gross; John King
- Production company: Red Hour Films
- Distributed by: New Line Cinema
- Release date: November 22, 2006
- Running time: 94 minutes
- Country: United States
- Language: English
- Budget: $19–20 million
- Box office: $13.9 million

Tenacious D in The Pick of Destiny is a 2006 American musical fantasy comedy film about comedy rock duo Tenacious D. Written by, produced by and starring Tenacious D members Jack Black and Kyle Gass, it is directed and co-written by musician and puppeteer Liam Lynch. Despite being about an actual band, the film is a fictitious story about the band's origins, and their journey to find a magical pick belonging to Satan that allows its users to become rock legends.

The film was released by New Line Cinema on November 22, 2006, and was a box office bomb. The soundtrack, The Pick of Destiny, was also released in 2006 as the band's second studio album. Despite the mixed box office reception of the film at release, it has since been considered a cult classic.

== Plot ==
As a young man, Jables (JB) runs away from his strict, religious family and oppressive Midwestern town for Hollywood after being graced by the word of Dio on a quest to form the world's "most awesome" rock band. There, he meets acoustic guitarist Kage (KG), who is performing on the street, and begins worshiping him as a rock god. JB asks KG to teach him rock and roll, only to be refused. Later in the night, a homeless and crestfallen JB mopes on a park bench, seconds before being beaten up by muggers. KG takes pity on JB and agrees to teach him, letting him sleep on the couch in his small apartment. KG feeds JB's fantasy by pretending to be famous with a self-named band ("The Kyle Gass Project"), exploiting him to do work such as cleaning his apartment and buying him weed, under the promise that JB can audition for his fictitious band. After JB learns KG is actually unemployed and living off his parents, the two become equal, and KG apologizes to JB by giving him a brand-new guitar. They create their own band: Tenacious D, named after matching birthmarks found on their buttocks.

Soon JB and KG learn the deepest secret of rock: all the rock legends used the same guitar pick, "the Pick of Destiny", which has 'supranatural' powers (a whole level above super). It was created in the Dark ages by a wizard who had summoned Satan for his own purposes but was promptly attacked. A nearby blacksmith heard the commotion and distracted the demon by tossing a horseshoe at it, chipping its tooth in the process. As Satan was now "incomplete", the wizard was able to banish Satan back to Hell. To repay the blacksmith, who desired the heart of a fair maiden, the wizard fashioned the tooth into a pick that would give its holder unnatural prowess with stringed instruments. Infatuated by the prospect of becoming the next great rock star, JB immediately sets Tenacious D on a quest to steal the Pick of Destiny from the Rock & Roll History Museum. Along the way, the band briefly splits up; KG decides that sex comes first in "sex, drugs, and rock 'n' roll" after getting invited to a party by young women, while JB wants to stick to the mission at hand. They are eventually reunited after KG is kicked out of the party.

Later, after an intense chase from the museum security guards, the two manage to steal the Pick of Destiny from the rock & roll museum. Armed with this supernatural pick, they plan to use the winnings from a local bar's talent contest to pay their rent, but, before they can go on stage, they argue over who gets to use the pick first, snapping it in half accidentally. The bar's owner persuades them to go on stage and compete in the contest without the pick. The owner is revealed to be Satan in human form, who places the Pick of Destiny back on his broken tooth. Complete again, he obtains supernatural powers on earth and threatens to make Tenacious D his first victims.

To save their lives, Tenacious D challenge Satan to a rock-off, which under the terms of the "demon code" he cannot decline. The terms, suggested by JB, are that if Tenacious D win, Satan must return to hell and pay their rent, but if they lose, Satan can take KG back with him as a sex slave. After the duel, Satan deems his rock better and attempts to shoot KG with a bolt of lightning from his fingertips, but JB jumps in the way to save him, and the bolt bounces off the "JB KG" drawn logo on the base of his guitar, blowing off a piece of Satan's horn. As Satan is now incomplete once again, JB sends him back to Hell with the wizard's magical incantation.

JB and KG turn Satan's horn into the "Bong of Destiny", which the two smoke from as they write new songs together.

== Cast ==
- Jack Black as himself
  - Troy Gentile as young J.B.
- Kyle Gass as himself
  - Mason Knight as young K.G.
- Ronnie James Dio as himself
- Dave Grohl as Satan
- Meat Loaf as Bud Black
- JR Reed as Lee
- Ben Stiller as Guitar Center Guy
- Paul F. Tompkins as Open Mic Host
- Tim Robbins as The Stranger
- John C. Reilly as Sasquatch
- Cynthia Ettinger as Betty Black
- Andrew Caldwell as Billy Black
- Amy Poehler as Truck Stop Waitress
- Colin Hanks as Drunk Frat Dude
- Amy Adams as Gorgeous Woman
- Gregg Turkington as Neil Hamburger
- Evie Peck as KG's Mother
- Jason Segel as Frat Boy #1 (deleted scene)
- David Krumholtz as Frat Boy #2 (deleted scene)
- Fred Armisen as Security Guard #1
- Ned Bellamy as Security Guard #2
- Jay Johnston as Gang Member #1
- John Ennis as Gang Member #2
- David Koechner as Surplus Store Clerk (deleted scene)

== Production ==
As actors, Jack Black and Kyle Gass had wished to make a Tenacious D film since the band's forming in 1994; archived footage of banter at an early concert records Black saying "a movie – like that would be the pinnacle".

The duo conceptualized numerous ideas for the plot, though the first actual known draft of a script was published on November 7, 2000. The script was based around many songs that would later be released on the duo's eponymous debut album that would be released the following year. There is little known about the script, other than it being based around the band playing coffee shops, Black becoming fascinated by Atlantis and Black and Gass both falling in love with a girl called Simmeon who has written books about the fictional island. They later meet Ronnie James Dio, and are sent on a road trip to Miami. This concept was later scrapped.

At some point prior to 2003, the band were in negotiations with British studio Working Title Films to write and distribute a Tenacious D film, but Black and Gass decided to assume creative control when they were not satisfied with the writers' ideas.

In February 2003, it was announced that the band had signed with New Line Cinema to create a Tenacious D film, with Liam Lynch as the director, and Black, Gass and Lynch writing the script and being producers on the production. There was also speculation that Red Hour Productions would produce the film, which was later confirmed. Later in 2003, Black announced the film's working title as Tenacious D in: The Pick of Destiny and that the script was about the band's search for a sacred guitar pick. Filming had been expected to take place by the end of 2003; however, it was delayed by almost a year due to Black being cast in Peter Jackson's big budget remake of King Kong. In December 2004, Black and Gass performed some songs from the upcoming soundtrack of the film whilst touring Australia, and announcing that the film would include cameos from Meat Loaf and Ronnie James Dio.

Principal photography for Tenacious D in The Pick of Destiny commenced in the spring of 2005, with the production finishing later that summer. The film held its first test screening to the press in October 2005. The film held two re-shoots in the summer of 2006 and according to Lynch, every crew member from the principal photography came back because they "had such a fun time working on set". Black also stated that the filming on this production was "the most fun I've ever had filming a movie".

Black agreed to a pay cut from his standard $12 million fee to $1 million that was then split between Black and Gass.

== Music ==
The soundtrack, the band's second studio album, includes vocals by Ronnie James Dio and Meat Loaf. Dave Grohl plays drums on the album, as he did on their first album, Tenacious D (2001). Grohl also contributes his vocals on "Beelzeboss (The Final Showdown)", as Satan. An edited version of the album was also released, replacing all of the profanity with made-up nonsense words.

== Release ==
=== Press ===
The band featured on numerous shows to promote the film, including musical performances on Saturday Night Live, Spike Video Game Awards, The David Letterman Show, American Music Awards, Late Night with Conan O'Brien, Friday Night with Jonathan Ross, as well as appearances on The Howard Stern Show, The British Comedy Awards and The Daily Show with Jon Stewart.

=== Tour ===
The band started a tour to support the film and soundtrack on November 11, 2006, with it finishing on February 21, 2007. The tour featured two legs in North America, one in Europe and one in Australia.

=== Book ===
A spin-off graphic novel book was released by Titan Books prior to the film's release, including high quality images through the set of the plot.

=== Premiere and theatrical run ===
Tenacious D in The Pick of Destiny had its British premiere on November 1, 2006, at the Vue West End cinema in London, England. The film's domestic premiere was held at Grauman's Chinese Theatre in Los Angeles on November 9, 2006. Many of the actors who had cameos in the film were in attendance; including Ronnie James Dio, Dave Grohl, and Ben Stiller.

The film received a wide theatrical release on November 22, 2006.

== Reception ==
=== Box office ===
"A lot of enthusiastic stoners were like, 'Yeah, du-u-u-de! Just saw it!' I was like, 'Where were you when the movie came out?' 'Sorry, dude, I was hi-i-i-gh!'"

— Jack Black on The Pick of Destiny's disappointing box-office performance.

Tenacious D in The Pick of Destiny performed poorly at the box office, only grossing a total of $8.2 million in the United States. It debuted with a mere $3 million during its opening weekend at number eleven.

=== Critical response ===
On the review aggregator website Rotten Tomatoes, the film has an approval rating of 53%, based on 124 reviews with an average rating of 5.60/10. The website's consensus states, "Tenacious D fans will find this movie hilarious; everybody else will see only a low-brow concept movie and a small assembly of jokes stretched past the 100 minute mark." On Metacritic, it has a score of 55 out of 100, based on reviews from 29 critics, indicating "mixed or average" reviews. Audiences polled by CinemaScore gave the film an average grade of "B−" on an A+ to F scale.

Michael Phillips of the Chicago Tribune criticized the frequency of the drug-use by saying: "This may be the problem. Pot rarely helped anybody's comic timing." Stephen Holden of The New York Times suggested that the film could be viewed as a "jolly rock 'n' roll comedy", but he also described the progression of the film as being a "garish mess".

== Home media ==
Tenacious D in The Pick of Destiny was released by New Line Home Entertainment on February 27, 2007, on DVD. A version sold by retail chain Best Buy came with a bonus disc with exclusive footage. Wal-Mart customers received a copy of the CD More Rocktastic Music from the Film bundled with the DVD, featuring excerpts of the score by Andrew Gross and John King, as well as songs from Gass' Trainwreck.

The film was released on home video on July 26, 2008, in Japan, with a deluxe edition of the movie with a T-shirt.

Home video releases have seen it bundled with Run, Fat Boy, Run and Dumb and Dumber in a three-disc set for the United States and Canada, whereas for the UK there was a three-disc set with Fracture and The Alibi. The Australian re-release featured the movie with Be Kind Rewind in a two-disc set, as well as another set with the film being bundled with Grandma's Boy. In Sweden, the film was bundled with Wedding Crashers.

In February 2024, Tenacious D in The Pick of Destiny was released on Blu-ray by Shout! Studios. This release includes the exclusive footage from the Best Buy bonus disc.

== Legacy ==
The band's 2012 album, Rize of the Fenix, is centered around the fictional plot of the band breaking up following the release of the film, with Gass going mentally insane as Black continued his fame in the film industry. The album also begins with the opening lyrics "When The Pick Of Destiny was released, it was a bomb".

In 2016, the band marked ten years of the film's release by using The Pick of Destiny as their backdrop for their appearances at Rock am Ring and Rock im Park, Roskilde Festival and Bråvalla Festival.

In 2019, Black expressed his disappointment with the reception of the movie, saying that both he and Gass were "devastated" that nobody went to see it. Regardless, he remains proud of The Pick of Destiny to this day and also the fact it has reached cult status.

In 2026, the guitar depicting a woman’s legs (from the Master Exploder section of the film) was placed on display at the Metropolitan Museum of Art’s “Musical Bodies” exhibition, running from June 7 to September 27.

== See also ==
- List of films featuring hallucinogens
