= John Konesky =

American guitarist, record producer (born 1980)

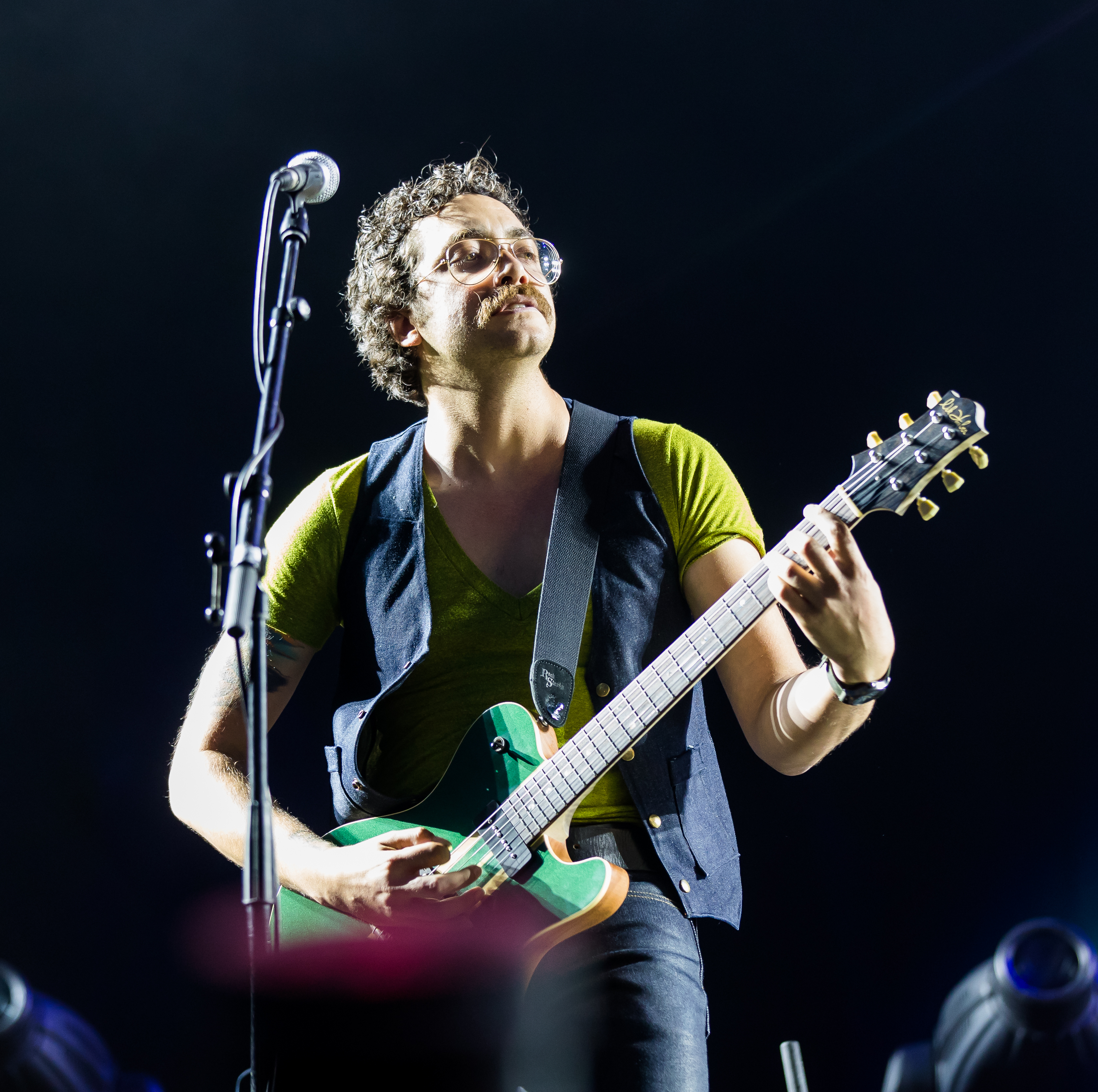
- Konesky in 2016

Background information
- Birth name: John S. Konesky
- Also known as: J.B. Shredman (with Trainwreck)("Kones" with Tenacious D)
- Born: November 19, 1980 (age 44); Columbus, Ohio, U.S.
- Genres: Comedy rock, Hard rock, Heavy metal, Southern rock
- Occupation: Guitarist
- Instrument: Guitar
- Years active: 2003 – present

John S. Konesky (born November 19, 1980) is an American guitarist and record producer, best known for his role as the lead electric guitar player for Tenacious D.

== Career ==
Konesky was born and raised in Columbus, Ohio, where he performed in a band with friend John Spiker. Through a mutual friend, he and Spiker met Tenacious D guitarist Kyle Gass, who was recruiting musicians for his Trainwreck project. In 2003, Konesky relocated to Los Angeles to become the electric guitarist for Trainwreck. In 2005, Konesky and Spiker performed on the second Tenacious D album The Pick of Destiny and would then perform live on The Pick of Destiny Tour, making them (alongside drummer Brooks Wackerman) additional live members of Tenacious D. In 2010, Trainwreck split up, which led him and Gass to form Kyle Gass Band. In 2012, Konesky formed country band Wynchester alongside Kyle Gass Band lead vocalist, Mike Bray, whom released their debut record in 2018 and toured with Tenacious D.

In 2009, Konesky and Gass worked together on the YouTube channel Guitarings. Konesky was a member of Tenacious D when the band won a Grammy in 2015 for their cover of Dio's "The Last in Line".

== Personal life ==
He graduated from Hilliard Davidson High School in 1999. He has played guitar for over 30 years, starting at the age of 9.

== Discography ==
- Trainwreck – Trainwreck Live (2004)
- Tenacious D – The Pick of Destiny (2006)
- John Konesky – Kones (2008)
- Trainwreck – The Wreckoning (2009)
- Tenacious D – Rize of the Fenix (2012)
- Kyle Gass Band – Kyle Gass Band (2013)
- Big Talk – Straight In No Kissin' (2015)
- Tenacious D – Tenacious D Live (2015)
- Kyle Gass Band – Thundering Herd (2016)
- John Carpenter – Anthology: Movie Themes 1974–1998 (2017) – Guitar on "In the Mouth of Madness"
- Wynchester – Wynchester (2018)
- Tenacious D – Post-Apocalypto (2018)
- Crusade – Origins (2024)
- Wynchester – Proud Bison (2024)
