= Kyle Gass =

American musician (born 1960)

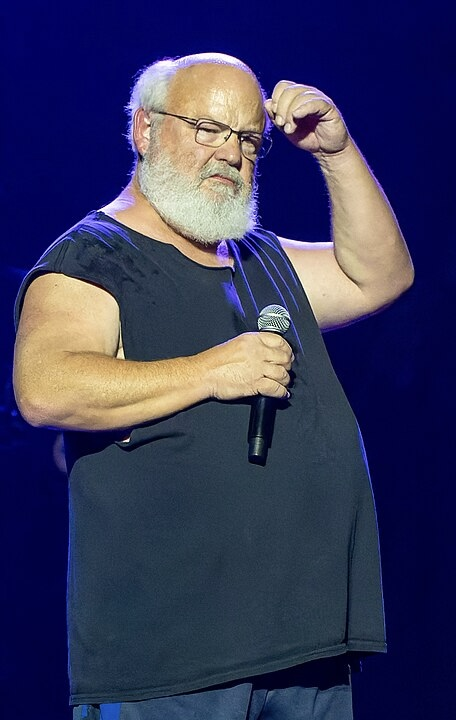
- Gass in 2023

Background information
- Also known as: KG; Kage; Rage Kage
- Born: Kyle Richard Gass; July 14, 1960 (age 66); Walnut Creek, California, U.S.
- Genres: Comedy rock; heavy metal; hard rock; Southern rock; acoustic rock
- Occupations: Musician; songwriter; actor; comedian
- Instruments: Guitar; vocals
- Years active: 1988–present
- Member of: Tenacious D; Trainwreck; Kyle Gass Band
- Website: kylegass.com

Kyle Richard Gass (born July 14, 1960) is an American musician, songwriter, comedian, and actor, best known as the lead guitarist of Tenacious D, a Grammy-winning comedy band. He is also a member of Trainwreck and the Kyle Gass Band.

== Early life ==
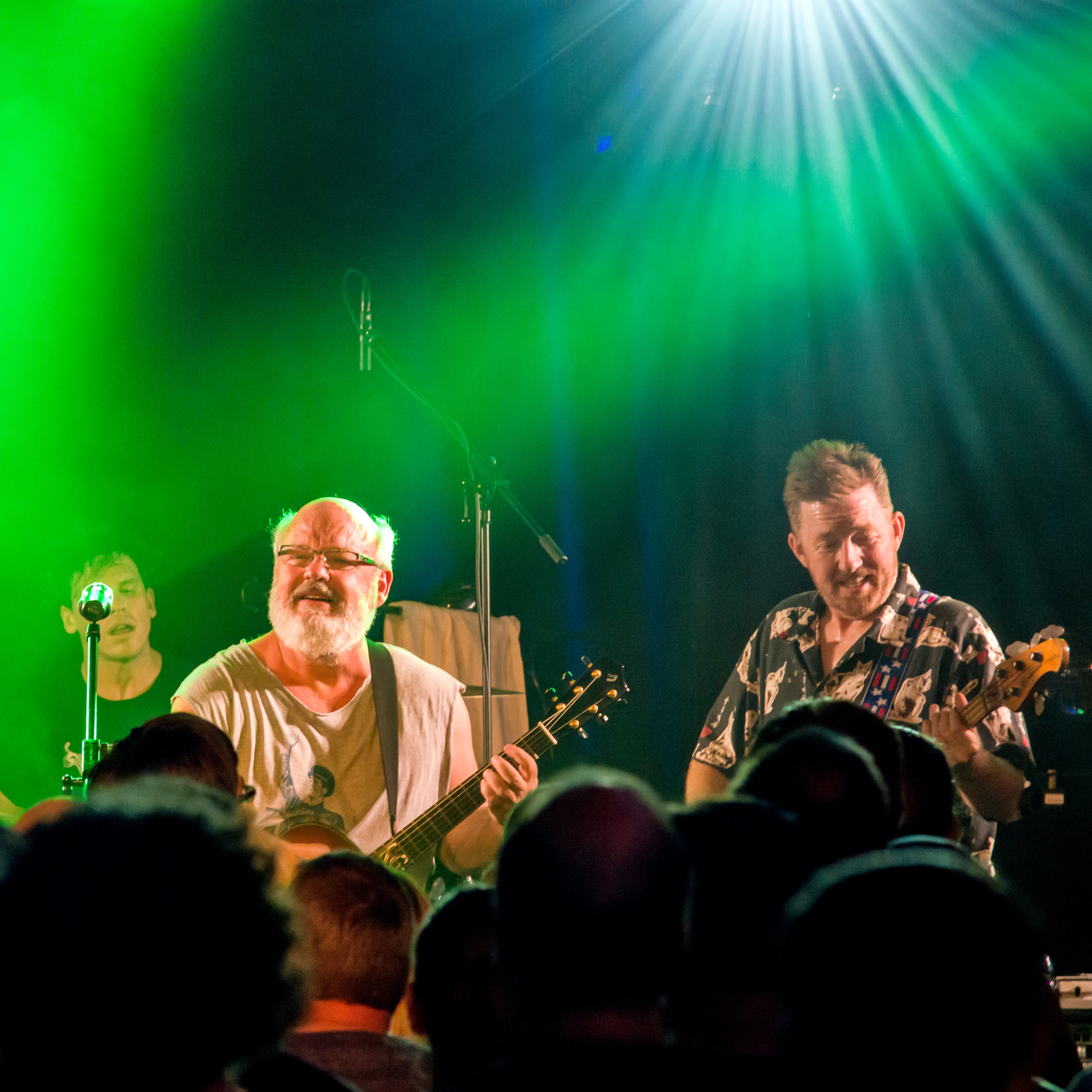
Gass with the Kyle Gass Band at the Zelt-Musik-Festival 2017 in Freiburg, Germany

Kyle Richard Gass was born in Walnut Creek, California on July 14, 1960. He has two brothers. At age 8, he learned to play guitar and flute and later made his first television appearance in an advertisement for 7UP. He attended Las Lomas High School, where he played flute with Greg Williams in the marching band and graduated in 1978. He studied acting at UCLA School of Theater, Film and Television, where he met Tim Robbins. In 1982, he joined Robbins' The Actors' Gang and in the early 1990s met and befriended Jack Black in the group.

== Career ==
=== Acting ===
Gass first appeared on-screen in a 1988 7-Up Gold commercial, and made his film debut two years later in the horror movie Brain Dead.

He made cameo appearances in 1996 film Bio-Dome (alongside Jack Black), the Seinfeld episode "The Abstinence" in 1996, a 1999 episode of the television show Fear of a Punk Planet, and a 2003 season 9 episode of Friends, ("The One with the Mugging"), as Phoebe’s street friend Lowell. He appeared in music videos for Good Charlotte's 2002 song "Lifestyles of the Rich and Famous", the Foo Fighters' 1999 song "Learn to Fly", and I Prevail's 2017 song "Already Dead". In 2017, Gass won the FilmQuest award for Best Supporting Actor for his role in the film Apartment 212.

Gass has played small roles in many of Black's films including Year One, Kung Fu Panda, Shallow Hal, Saving Silverman and The Cable Guy. He also starred with Black in the movie Tenacious D in the Pick of Destiny.

Gass appeared in Jacob's Ladder (1990), appeared as the "couch potato" in The Cable Guy (1996), and as an inept author of children's books in the comedy Elf (2003). He had a cameo role as a singing karaoke cowboy in Wild Hogs (2007). In 2008 he played the porn director in Extreme Movie, Walrus Boy in Wieners, the dirty trucker in the men's room in Sex Drive, and Decatur Doublewide in Lower Learning.

=== Music ===
In Tenacious D, Gass plays lead guitar and sings backing vocals, and also plays the role of Black's comic foil in most of their comedy routines.

While appearing on Late Night with Conan O'Brien on November 15, 2006, Gass claimed to have been the youngest graduate of the Juilliard School of Music with a degree in classical guitar studies at the age of 13. Juilliard did not have a guitar program in 1973, but began its graduate level guitar program in 1989 under Sharon Isbin, and its undergraduate program in 2007. Earlier, in an article in the Sunday Times on October 29, 2006, Black stated that Gass was the youngest graduate of Juilliard. On May 13, 2008, Gass was a phone-in guest on the Adam Carolla Show. When Adam Carolla asked him "... And did you go to Juilliard?" Kyle replied "I didn't. I—you know, I made that up as a joke," he continued, "and I thought it would be hilarious, and then I've been hearing about it ever since. Apologies to Juilliard."

In 2017, Gass performed the song "Penelope" for Amazon Music's "Love Me Not" compilation album.

In 2021, Gass announced his first solo tour "Kyle Gass Must Save the World". However, it was later cancelled.

On July 16, 2024, Jack Black announced the cancellation of the ongoing Tenacious D Australian tour after Gass said, "Don't miss Trump next time," on stage two days earlier, referencing an at the time recent attempted assassination of Donald Trump. Gass made the comment after being presented with a birthday cake for his 64th birthday and was asked by Black to "make a wish". Two days later, Black said on social media that he was "blindsided" by Gass's comment, and that he would "never condone hate speech or encourage political violence in any form". Tenacious D canceled the remainder of their world tour, and Black said their "future creative plans are on hold". Gass apologized on social media, calling his comment "Highly inappropriate, dangerous and a terrible mistake," that he did not condone violence "of any kind, in any form, against anyone," and described the shooting as a "tragedy". He was subsequently dropped by his longtime talent agent, Michael Greene. Gass deleted the apology two days later. At the premiere for the film Borderlands on August 6, Black said he and Gass remained friends and would return "when it feels right". Gass stated in January 2026 that he and Black had "hashed things out" and returned to writing music together. Despite this, Black stated to a TMZ correspondent three months later that the group had "no plans".

=== Other media ===
Gass starred in a web show, Guitarings, with John Konesky and currently hosts the Did We Do It podcast with Kevin Weisman. He has appeared as a contestant on the TV game show Sale of the Century.

== Discography ==
with Tenacious D

- Tenacious D (2001)
- The Pick of Destiny (2006)
- Rize of the Fenix (2012)
- Post-Apocalypto (2018)

with Trainwreck

- The Wreckoning (2009)

with Kyle Gass Band

- Kyle Gass Band (2013)
- Thundering Herd (2016)

== Filmography ==
=== Film ===
Year	Title	Role	Notes
1990	Brain Dead	Anaesthetist	
1990	Jacob's Ladder	Tony	
1993	Mike the Detective	Phil	
1995	The Barefoot Executive	Joe	
1996	Bio-Dome	KG	
1996	The Cable Guy	Couch Potato	
1997	Bongwater	Guitarist	
1999	Idle Hands	Burger Jungle Guy	
1999	Cradle Will Rock	Larry	
2000	Almost Famous	Quince Allen	
2001	Saving Silverman	Bar Dude	
2001	The Zeros	Reed / David	
2001	Evolution	Officer Drake	
2001	Shallow Hal	Artie	
2002	The New Guy	Mr. Luberoff	
2003	Elf	Eugene	
2006	Tenacious D in The Pick of Destiny	KG	
2007	Wild Hogs	Lead Singer	
2007	Monkeys	Uncredited	
2008	Kung Fu Panda	KG Shaw (voice)	
2008	Wieners	Walrus Boy	
2008	Dead and Gone	Reverend Grass	
2008	Lower Learning	Decatur Doublewide	
2008	Sex Drive	Trucker	Unrated version
2008	Extreme Movie	Director	
2009	Year One	Zaftig the Eunuch	
2010	Barry Munday	Jerry Sherman	
2011	High Road	Winter Weirdo	
2012	Beverly Hills Chihuahua 3: Viva La Fiesta!	Lester	
2014	Book of Fire	Sal	
2015	Circus	Circus	Short film
2017	Gnaw (Apartment 212)	Terry	
2024	Dear Santa	Science Teacher	
2025	The Sound	Bill	

=== Television ===
Year	Title	Role	Notes
1996	Seinfeld	Smoker	Episode: "The Abstinence"
1997–2000	Tenacious D	KG	Main role
1999–2002	Fear of a Punk Planet	Fire Marshal Lyle	3 episodes
2000	Manhattan, AZ	Merv	Episode: "Lt. Colonel's Boy"
2001–2002	Undeclared	Eugene	Episode: "Eric Visits Again" and "Eric's POV"
2001	Space Ghost Coast to Coast	Himself	Episode: "Sweet for Brak"
2002–2003	Fillmore!	Mr. Collingwood (voice)	2 episodes
2002, 2006	Saturday Night Live	Himself	2 episodes
2003	Friends	Lowell	Episode: "The One with the Mugging"
2003	Player$	Himself	Episode: "Tenacious D a la Mode"
2004	Cracking Up	Naked Man	Episode: "Panic House"
2004	Tom Goes to the Mayor	Trapper Kyle	Episode: "Beat Traps"
2005	Living with Fran	Ken	Episode: "The Concerts"
2006	The Jake Effect	Mr. Seissner	Recurring role, 7 episodes
2007	The Naked Trucker and T-Bones Show	Himself	Episode: "Break Up"
2011	FCU: Fact Checkers Unit	Himself	Episode: "Excessive Gass "
2012	Femme Fatales	Willoughby Flagler	Episode: "Gun Twisted"
2013	2 Broke Girls	Buzz	Episode: "And the Extra Work"
2013	Ghost Ghirls	"Hawk" Olsen	Episode: "Spirits of '76: Part 1 & 2"
2014	The Birthday Boys	John Allison	Episode: "Freshy's"
2015	Drunk History	Fred Eaton	Episode: "Los Angeles"
2018	Brooklyn Nine-Nine	Dario Moretti	Episode: "Jake & Amy"
2018	Tenacious D in Post-Apocalypto	KG	Main role
2018–2019	Speechless	Carl	3 episodes
2022	Hacks	Axel	Episode: "The Click"

=== Video games ===
Year	Title	Role	Notes
2009	Brütal Legend	Kage the Kannonier	Also facial likeness

=== Music videos ===
Year	Video	Artist	Role	Label
1999	"Learn to Fly"	Foo Fighters	Flight attendant	Roswell Records
2001	"Lifestyles of the Rich and Famous"	Good Charlotte	Lawyer	Epic Records
2017	"Already Dead"	I Prevail	Internet troll	Fearless Records
