= Stray Blues =

Stray Blues: A Collection of B-Sides

Compilation album by Beck
- Released: June 13, 2000
- Genres: Anti-folk, alternative rock, alternative country, alternative hip hop, hipster hop
- Length: 29:05
- Labels: Geffen; Universal Music Japan

Beck chronology
Midnite Vultures (1999)	Stray Blues: A Collection of B-Sides (2000)	Beck (2001)

Professional ratings
Review scores
Source	Rating
AllMusic	4/5 stars
Robert Christgau	(neither)
Pitchfork	7/10

Stray Blues: A Collection of B-Sides is a compilation album by Beck, released in 2000. It is a collection of B-sides that was only released in Japan. It features "Burro," a Spanish version of "Jack-Ass," and a cover of Skip Spence's "Halo of Gold."

With the exception of "Totally Confused" and "Halo of Gold", all songs were later released on the deluxe edition of Odelay.

== Track listing ==
All songs written by Beck, except where noted.

1. "Totally Confused" – 3:30
2. "Halo of Gold" (Skip Spence) – 4:29
3. "Burro" – 3:13
4. "Brother" – 4:48
5. "Lemonade" – 2:24
6. "Electric Music and the Summer People" – 3:35
7. "Clock" (Beck, John King, Michael Simpson) – 3:19
8. "Feather in Your Cap" – 3:45
