= Sissyneck =

Single by Beck

from the album Odelay
- Released: June 17, 1997
- Genre: Country
- Length: 4:02
- Label: DGC
- Songwriter(s): Beck Hansen, John King, Michael Simpson
- Producer(s): Beck, Dust Brothers

Beck singles chronology
"The New Pollution" (1997)	"Sissyneck" (1997)	"Jack-Ass" (1997)

"Sissyneck" is a song by American musician Beck, released as the fourth single from his fifth album, Odelay (1996). For the bass line of the song, the Dust Brothers sampled "A Part of Me" by the band Country Funk. The whistling in the introduction comes from "The Moog and Me" by Dick Hyman. The organ line is from "Life" by Sly & the Family Stone. The song peaked at No. 30 on the UK Singles Chart.

== Critical reception ==
British magazine Music Week rated the song three out of five, picking it as Single of the Week. They added, "Gaining converts by the day, Beck's maverick touch has now felt fully by the mainstream and this typically languid effort will reinforce his growing reputation as a very cool cat." David Sinclair from The Times described it as a "gloriously off-kilter combination of country-rock tune and street-hustle percussion."

== Controversy ==
In the early versions of this song, Beck sampled a talking Barbie doll, but Mattel did not grant permission to include the audio.

== Track listing ==
=== Three-track single ===
1. "Sissyneck" – 3:55
2. "The New Pollution" (Remix by Mickey P.) – 4:08
3. "Feather in Your Cap" – 3:46
  - This version can be found on the SubUrbia soundtrack.

=== Alternate pressing ===
1. "Sissyneck" (LP version) – 3:58
2. "Burro" (Mariachi Version of "Jack-Ass") – 3:11
3. "Dark and Lovely" (Remix by Dust Brothers) – 3:38
4. "Devil Got My Woman" (Skip James cover) – 4:34
5. "Brother" – 4:45

=== UK 7" vinyl ===
1. "Sissyneck" (LP version) – 3:58
2. "Feather in Your Cap" – 3:46

=== Cassette ===
1. "Sissyneck" (LP version) – 3:55
2. "The New Pollution" (Remix by Mickey P.) – 4:08

== Personnel ==
- Beck – vocals, guitars, bass, organ, congas, programming, composition
- Mike Boito – organ
- Gregory Liesz – pedal steel guitar
- The Dust Brothers – programming, composition
