= Beck (EP) =

EP by Beck
- Released: February 12, 2001
- Genre: Alternative rock
- Length: 42:52
- Label: Geffen

Beck chronology
Stray Blues (2000)	Beck (2001)	Sea Change (2002)

Beck (also known as Beck.com B-Sides) is an EP by the American musician Beck, consisting of B-sides from the Midnite Vultures era, released in 2001. The EP was initially planned to be released in mid-1998. Only 10,000 copies were printed, which were only available on Beck's website. The EP was an enhanced CD and it also included the "Nicotine & Gravy" video.

The track "Arabian Nights" had previously been available only on a Japanese release of Midnite Vultures. Remixes of "Mixed Bizness" were by fans, submitted for an online contest. The track "Zatyricon" includes the recording, by producer Tony Hoffer, of a telephone call to a plastic surgery clinic. Critic Nick Hyman of Under the Radar, in a positive review, singled out the track "Dirty Dirty", writing that it "sounds like Beck had one too many while hanging out with Basement Jaxx and went into the studio and laid down the track".

== Track listing ==
1. "Arabian Nights" – 4:11
2. "Dirty Dirty" – 4:38
3. "Midnite Vultures" – 7:17
4. "Mixed Bizness" (The Latin Mix by Scatter-Shot Theory) – 4:57
5. "Mixed Bizness" (Hardmixn by Jake Kozel, a.k.a. Socket 7) – 6:16
6. "Salt in the Wound" – 3:24
7. "Sexx Laws" (Malibu remix) – 6:52
8. "Zatyricon" – 5:13
9. "Nicotine & Gravy" (enhanced video) – 3:22
