= Guerolito =

Remix album by Beck
- Released: December 13, 2005
- Recorded: September 2003 – August 2004
- Genre: Alternative rock
- Length: 54:10
- Label: Geffen
- Producers: Beck Hansen, The Dust Brothers

Beck chronology
Guero (2005)	Guerolito (2005)	The Information (2006)

Professional ratings
Aggregate scores
Source	Rating
Metacritic	(66/100)
Review scores
Source	Rating
AllMusic	2.5/5 stars
The A.V. Club	B
Encyclopedia of Popular Music	3/5 stars
Entertainment Weekly	B+
Entertainment.ie	2/5 stars
NME	7/10
Pitchfork	6.2/10
PopMatters	6/10 stars
Q	2/5 stars
Uncut	2/5 stars

Guerolito is the second remix album by Beck, released in the US on December 13, 2005 and in the UK on January 23, 2006. It features all of the songs from regular edition of Guero in remixed forms by a variety of artists, with the addition of "Clap Hands", originally found on the special limited edition of Guero.

Guerolito reached number 191 on the Billboard 200. As of 2008, Guerolito has sold 76,000 copies in the United States.

== Background ==
In a 2006 interview, Beck challenged other artists to follow his lead—set by Guerolito—in abandoning the traditional concept of an album release:

There are so many dimensions to what a record can be these days. Artists can and should approach making an album as an opportunity to do a series of releases—one that's visual, one that has alternate versions, and one that's something the listener can participate in or arrange and change. It's time for the album to embrace the technology. For me it's more about giving the music legs, giving people new ways to experience it ... Even though the mashup sensibility has become something of a cliché, I'd love to put out an album that you could edit and mix and layer directly in iTunes.

— Beck

== Track listing ==
All songs were written by Beck Hansen and The Dust Brothers, except where noted.

1. "Ghost Range" ("E-Pro" remix by Homelife) (Hansen, Dust Brothers, Beastie Boys) – 4:24
2. "Qué Onda Guero" (Islands remix) – 2:29
3. "Girl" (Octet remix) – 3:53
  - Originally released on the special edition CD/DVD package of Guero
4. "Heaven Hammer" ("Missing" remix by Air) (Hansen, Dust Brothers, Vinicius de Moraes, Carlos Lyra) – 4:54
5. "Shake Shake Tambourine" ("Black Tambourine" remix by Ad-Rock) (Hansen, Dust Brothers, Eugene Blacknell) – 3:37
6. "Terremoto Tempo" ("Earthquake Weather" remix by Mario C) (Hansen, Dust Brothers, Mark Adams, Steve Washington, Daniel Webster, Mark Hicks) – 3:47
7. "Ghettochip Malfunction" ("Hell Yes" remix by 8-Bit) – 2:39
  - Originally released on the Hell Yes EP
8. "Broken Drum" (Boards of Canada remix) (Hansen) – 5:36
  - Originally released on the special edition CD/DVD package of Guero
9. "Scarecrow" (El-P remix) – 4:37
10. "Wish Coin" ("Go It Alone" remix by Diplo) (Hansen, Dust Brothers, Jack White) – 3:44
11. "Farewell Ride" (Subtle remix) (Hansen) – 4:51
12. "Rental Car" (John King remix) – 2:59
13. "Emergency Exit" (Th' Corn Gangg remix) – 3:18
14. "Clap Hands" – 3:19
  - Originally released on the special edition CD/DVD package of Guero

=== Bonus tracks on UK release ===
15. "Fax Machine Anthem (Hell Yes)" (Dizzee Rascal remix) – 3:07
  - Originally released on the special edition CD/DVD package of Guero
16. "Qué Onda Guero" (Nortec Collective remix) – 4:44
