= Girl (Beck song) =

2005 single by Beck

Single by Beck

from the album Guero
- B-side: "Girl" remixes
- Released: July 4, 2005
- Recorded: 2004
- Genre: Pop
- Length: 3:32
- Label: Interscope
- Songwriters: Beck Hansen; The Dust Brothers
- Producers: Beck Hansen; The Dust Brothers

Beck singles chronology
| "E-Pro" (2005) | "Girl" (2005) | "Hell Yes" (2005) |

Music video
- "Girl" on YouTube

"Girl" is a song by Beck from his 2005 album Guero. Released as the second single from the album in July 2005, the song peaked at number 8 on the Alternative Songs chart.

Beginning with 13 seconds of a simple chiptune melody, the song then proceeds to acoustic guitars and drums.

== Composition ==
Beck and the Dust Brothers began working on the song years before its release on Guero.

John King of the Dust Brothers said that at first, "it was a masterpiece of sound, confusing and all over the place." The song's early renditions went through several different lyrics, and had names such as "Songy" and "Summer Girl."

King said that Beck liked the chorus of "Girl" and that they "stripped away everything but the keyboard, and a bass we eventually replaced. I pulled up a new beat, and something was happening that was infectious, and we felt we could listen to it all day. Beck began jamming acoustic guitar over it."

== Live history ==
"Girl" has been performed over 300 times, as it has been performed regularly since its release in 2005.

== Music video ==
In the video for "Girl", directed by Motion Theory and inspired by the MAD fold-ins by Al Jaffee, Beck gets a limousine advertisement entitled "Lester's Big Ass Limousines...Moving Party For Hire" which folds to become "Less Is More". Later on, Beck is in a pharmacy, buying an over-the-counter drug. When he is looking at it, the walls and floor fold, making a skull with red eyes on the shelves and a sign above reading "Side Effects: Death".

The next fold is at what seems to be a garage sale. There is a painting of the Virgin Mary on the wall, which then folds. In the foreground, two toy cars have been folded together. Beck is seen later on in the video driving the car that looks like the car that this fold makes. The next fold takes place on a sidewalk, where a little girl is doing a chalk drawing. After she sets down the chalk and walks away, the side walk folds and it takes the form of human outline, with police and the yellow tape around it.

The next fold is a homeless person begging on the corner when Beck is driving by. The man holds a sign in his hand which says "Loose Change OK All Helps Anyway". The man proceeds to fold the sign, which now reads "Look Away". Later in the video, a sign is folded together to form the words "Where It's At" with 2 records and a microphone, referencing the Beck song of the same name.

The 1972 El Camino Beck is driving in the video has the license plate "3CK 61RL".

=== MAD references in the video ===
When Beck is looking at the TV, when the screen's image folds in it says "Al Jaffee", and at the very end where he sits on the bench, the fold-in reveals an Alfred E. Neuman smile. The very use of fold-in scenes is itself a tribute to MAD, which features a fold-in on the back inside cover of every issue.

== Charts ==
=== Weekly charts ===
Weekly chart performance for "Girl"
| Chart (2005) | Peak position |
|---|---|
| Canada Rock Top 30 (Radio & Records) | 21 |
| US Alternative Airplay (Billboard) | 8 |
| US Adult Alternative Airplay (Billboard) | 4 |
| US Pop 100 (Billboard) | 71 |

=== Year-end charts ===
Year-end chart performance for "Girl"
| Chart (2005) | Position |
|---|---|
| US Modern Rock Tracks (Billboard) | 45 |

== Track listing ==
=== CD ===
1. "Girl" – 3:32
2. "Girl (Octet remix)" – 3:53
3. "Girl (Paza remix)" – 2:47
4. "Girl" video

=== 7" ===
1. "Girl" – 3:32
2. "Girl (Octet remix)" – 3:53
