= Guero =

Studio album by Beck
- Released: March 29, 2005
- Recorded: September 2003–August 2004
- Studios: The Boat (Silver Lake); Madhatter (Los Angeles); The Sound Factory (Los Angeles)
- Genres: Alternative rock; alternative hip-hop; sampledelia
- Length: 49:55
- Label: Interscope
- Producers: Beck Hansen; Dust Brothers; Tony Hoffer

Beck chronology
Sea Change (2002)	Guero (2005)	Guerolito (2005)

Singles from Guero
- 1. "E-Pro" Released: March 14, 2005; 2. "Girl" Released: July 4, 2005 (UK); 3. "Hell Yes" Released: 2005

Guero is the ninth studio album by American musician Beck, released on March 29, 2005, by Interscope Records. It was produced with John King and Mike Simpson of the Dust Brothers, who had worked with Beck on his 1996 album Odelay, as well as Tony Hoffer.

The album was promoted with the singles "E-Pro", "Girl", and "Hell Yes", and debuted at number two on the US Billboard 200. To date, it is Beck's highest-charting album and had sold over 868,000 copies in the United States as of July 2008. It received positive reviews from critics.

== Background ==
Güero (pron. IPA ['wero]) means "blond" in Mexican Spanish, but can also refer to a light-skinned person. MTV described the term as being "Mexican slang for a blond-haired, fair-skinned Caucasian".

Beck was raised in a predominantly Chicano area of Los Angeles. In an interview with ABC's Nightline, Beck said the term "guero" was "something that I'd hear growing up. Something I'd hear on the street, walking to school or something, I'd get called a 'Guero'. ... It's just a word that stuck in my head and I wanted to do something with that at some point. ... I ended up, in the end, just kind of doing this almost journalistic kind of look at that whole time."

The title of track 2, "Qué Onda Guero" (or "¿Qué onda, güero?"), is Mexican slang for "what up, whitey?"

== Recording ==
The album was recorded over a period of nine months, following a year and a half of touring in the aftermath of the September 11 attacks. Several other events contributed to the writing of the songs, including the death of Beck's friend Elliott Smith and the impending birth of Beck's child with wife Marissa Ribisi. The song "Broken Drum" is dedicated to Smith. More than 15 songs were considered for the final running order of the album.

"Hell Yes" features spoken contributions from Christina Ricci, who happened to be in the studio at the time of recording. Beck and the Dust Brothers had spent weeks auditioning sushi waitresses around Los Angeles but chose Ricci after she "tried it and just absolutely nailed it". She is credited as "Kurisuti-na" in the album's liner notes.

Jack White of the White Stripes plays bass on "Go It Alone". Money Mark, solo artist and keyboardist for the Beastie Boys, plays the organ on "Earthquake Weather". Petra Haden, formerly of That Dog and the Rentals, provides an intricate backing vocal track for "Rental Car".

== Release ==
Guero was initially intended to be released on October 26, 2004, but was pushed back, due to delays with the artwork, mixing and music videos. An unmixed and un-mastered version of the album was leaked in January 2005, under the title Ubiquitous. The track listing differed slightly from the officially announced track listing of Guero. On February 1, Beck released the Hell Yes EP on iTunes, which included remixes of the title track and "Que Onda Guero" by 8-bit and "E-Pro" and "Girl" by Paza. On March 10, five songs from the forthcoming album were featured in an episode of The O.C.

Guero was released on March 29. The album was released simultaneously in three formats: a standard 13-track CD, PlayStation Portable UMD and a deluxe CD/DVD edition. The latter featured seven bonus tracks, a surround sound mix and interactive video art for each song.

Later in 2005, Beck released an album of Guero remixes called Guerolito, featuring remixes by Boards of Canada, Octet, the Beastie Boys' Ad-Rock and the Dust Brothers' John King.

"Black Tambourine" was featured in the David Lynch film Inland Empire, the trailer for the film (500) Days of Summer, and episode 22 of season 4 of The Good Wife, as well as the 2006 video game Lumines II, and the video game Driver: San Francisco. "Farewell Ride" was featured in FX trailers promoting the final season of The Shield.

== Reception ==
Professional ratings
Aggregate scores
Source	Rating
Metacritic	78/100
Review scores
Source	Rating
AllMusic	4/5 stars
Blender	4/5 stars
Entertainment Weekly	A−
The Guardian	4/5 stars
The Independent	5/5 stars
NME	8/10
Pitchfork	6.6/10
Q	3/5 stars
Rolling Stone	4/5 stars
Spin	B

=== Commercial ===
Guero debuted on the Billboard 200 at No. 2, marking Beck's best chart performance to date, and sold 162,000 copies in its first week. It was certified gold by the RIAA on June 7, 2005.

=== Critical ===
Guero received generally positive reviews from critics. On Metacritic it has a score of 78 out of 100, based on reviews from 39 critics, indicating "universal acclaim". Several critics compared the album to Beck's 1996 album Odelay, while others observed that such comparisons were inevitable but ultimately misguided.

Rob Sheffield of Rolling Stone called the album "the first record since Odelay where Beck mixes up the medicine the way he did in his Nineties prime". Contrasting the album with the "wiseass charisma" of his early albums, Sheffield noted that Beck now sounded "like an extremely bummed-out dude who made it to the future and discovered he hates it there." David Browne of Entertainment Weekly called Guero "alive and frisky" when compared to its predecessor, Sea Change (2002), and called it Beck's "most inviting, least off-putting work in years", praising its "slightly broader emotional range". Browne stated that the album felt "simultaneously familiar and new" and was "the first record on which the many moods and sides of Beck coexist". Andy Gill of The Independent observed that "Beck darts around the musical map like an animated flea," and praised the album's "judicious blends of beats, riffs, songs and raps spiralling off in a variety of directions". Gill highlighted the song "Missing" and its "reflections on the essential patchwork incompleteness of life", comparing it to Beck's work on the whole, "which typically makes unorthodox wholes from diverse fragments."

Rob Mitchum of Pitchfork gave the album a mixed review and compared the album extensively to Odelay, stating, "one wonders whether Mr. Hansen's heart is in the proceedings, as many of the songs appear to be little more than weak echoes of their similar predecessors". Mitchum concluded that "the final result feels rote and calculated."

The album was included in the book 1001 Albums You Must Hear Before You Die.

== Track listing ==
No.	Title	Writer(s)	Length
1.	"E-Pro"	Beck Hansen, Dust Brothers, Michael Diamond, Adam Horovitz, Adam Yauch	3:22
2.	"Qué Onda Guero"	Hansen, Dust Brothers	3:29
3.	"Girl"	Hansen, Dust Brothers	3:30
4.	"Missing"	Hansen, Dust Brothers, Vinicius de Moraes, Carlos Lyra	4:44
5.	"Black Tambourine"	Hansen, Dust Brothers, Eugene Blacknell	2:46
6.	"Earthquake Weather"	Hansen, Dust Brothers, Mark Adams, Steve Washington, Daniel Webster, Mark Hicks	4:26
7.	"Hell Yes"	Hansen, Dust Brothers	3:18
8.	"Broken Drum"	Hansen	4:30
9.	"Scarecrow"	Hansen, Dust Brothers	4:16
10.	"Go It Alone"	Hansen, Dust Brothers, Jack White	4:09
11.	"Farewell Ride"	Hansen	4:19
12.	"Rental Car"	Hansen, Dust Brothers	3:05
13.	"Emergency Exit"	Hansen, Dust Brothers	4:01
Total length:			49:55

Deluxe edition bonus tracks
No.	Title	Notes	Length
14.	"Send a Message to Her"	Also on UK, Australian, Russian releases and Japanese tour edition	4:31
15.	"Chain Reaction"	Also on UK release and Japanese tour edition	3:30
16.	"Clap Hands"	Also on Japanese tour edition	3:18
17.	"Girl" (Remix)	Remixed by Octet	3:54
18.	"Broken Drum" (Remix)	Remixed by Boards of Canada	5:39
19.	"Still Missing"	"Missing" remix by Röyksopp	4:58
20.	"Fax Machine Anthem"	"Hell Yes" remix by Dizzee Rascal	3:07

Sample credits

Song	Sample	Artist
"E-Pro"	"So What'cha Want"	Beastie Boys
"Missing"	"Você e Eu"	Claus Ogerman and His Orchestra
"Black Tambourine"	"We Know We Gotta Live Together"	Eugene Blacknell & The New Breed
"Earthquake Weather"	"What It Is?"	The Temptations
"Earthquake Weather"	"Coming Soon", "Just Freak"	Slave
"Hell Yes"	"Far East Mississippi"	The Ohio Players
"Hell Yes"	"Under the Influence of Love"	Love Unlimited
"Go It Alone"	"Outside Love"	Brethren

== Personnel ==
Musicians

- Beck – vocals (tracks 1–13), guitar (1–3, 5–6, 9–10, 13), bass guitar (1, 3, 5, 7–9, 12–13), additional sounds (2), slide guitar (3, 11, 13), intro programming (3), percussion (4, 11–13), tambourines (5), acoustic guitar (6, 8, 12), electric guitar (6, 12), harmonica (7, 9), vocoder (7), piano (8, 11), celesta (8), drums (8), beats (8, 11), keyboards (10), handclaps (10, 12–13), kalimba (11), 12-string guitar (12, 13), stomp (13)
- The Dust Brothers – beats (1–7, 10, 12), handclaps (10)
- Paolo Díaz – "dude" (2)
- Charlie Capen – additional sounds (2)
- Sean Davis – bass guitar (4)
- Roger Joseph Manning Jr. – Clavinet (6, 12)
- Money Mark – organ (6)
- Justin Meldal-Johnsen – bass (6, 12), guitar sounds (12)
- Joey Waronker – drums (6)
- Smokey Hormel – electric guitar (6)
- Christina Ricci (as Kurisuti-na) – girl (7), forehead-slap solo (7)
- Jack White – bass guitar (10)
- Petra Haden – vocals (12)

Technical

- Beck – co-producer (1–13), engineer (1–13), mixing (1–13), string arranger (4, 13), art direction, design
- The Dust Brothers – co-producers (1–7, 9–10, 12–13), engineers (1–7, 9–10, 12–13), mixing (1–7, 9–10, 12–13)
- Danny Kalb – engineer (1–7, 9–10, 12–13)
- Mark Branch – assistant engineer (1–7, 9–10, 12–13)
- Mike Laza – assistant engineer (1–7, 9–10, 12–13)
- Brad Breeck – sound designer (1–7, 9–10, 12–13)
- Nigel Godrich – mixing (3)
- Dan Grech-Marguerat – mixing engineer (3)
- Tony Hoffer – co-producer, engineer, mixing (8, 11)
- Jason Mott – assistant engineer (8, 11)
- Bob Ludwig – mastering
- David Campbell – string arrangement (4, 13)
- Kevin Reagan – art direction, design
- Marcel Dzama – artwork
- Melanie Pullen – photo
- Adam Levite – additional art, front cover layout
- Elliot Scheiner – surround mix (deluxe edition)

== Charts ==
=== Weekly charts ===
Chart (2005)	Peak position
Australian Albums (ARIA)	14
Austrian Albums (Ö3 Austria)	23
Belgian Albums (Ultratop Flanders)	16
Belgian Albums (Ultratop Wallonia)	29
Canadian Albums (Billboard)	2
Danish Albums (Hitlisten)	4
Finnish Albums (Suomen virallinen lista)	27
French Albums (SNEP)	33
German Albums (Offizielle Top 100)	33
New Zealand Albums (RMNZ)	30
Norwegian Albums (VG-lista)	5
Portuguese Albums (AFP)	11
Spanish Albums (Promusicae)	41
Swedish Albums (Sverigetopplistan)	26
Swiss Albums (Schweizer Hitparade)	20
UK Albums (Official Charts)	15
US Billboard 200	2

=== Year-end charts ===
Chart (2005)	Position
US Billboard 200	88

== Certifications ==
Region	Certification	Certified units/sales
Canada (Music Canada)	Gold	50,000^{^}
Japan (RIAJ)	Gold	100,000^{^}
United Kingdom (BPI)	Silver	60,000^{^}
United States (RIAA)	Gold	868,000
^{^} Shipments figures based on certification alone.
