= New Funky Nation =

Studio album by Boo-Yaa T.R.I.B.E.
- Released: April 10, 1990
- Recorded: 1989–1990
- Studios: Image; Paramount (Hollywood, CA)
- Genre: Hip hop
- Length: 56:18
- Labels: 4th & B'way; Island; PolyGram
- Producers: Joe "The Butcher" Nicolo; Dust Brothers; Myles John O'Brien; Tony G.; Boo-Yaa T.R.I.B.E.; Suga Pop

Boo-Yaa T.R.I.B.E. chronology
New Funky Nation (1990)	Doomsday (1994)

Singles from New Funky Nation
- 1. "R.A.I.D." Released: February 1, 1990; 2. "Psyko Funk" Released: June 4, 1990; 3. "Walk the Line" Released: November 5, 1990

New Funky Nation is the debut studio album by the Samoan-American hip hop band Boo-Yaa T.R.I.B.E. It was released in 1990 via 4th & B'way Records/Island Records. The recording sessions took place at Image Recording Studios and Paramount Studios, from 1989 to 1990. The album was produced by the Dust Brothers, John O'Brien, Joe Nicolo of the Butcher Bros., Tony G., Suga Pop, and Boo-Yaa T.R.I.B.E. It peaked at No. 33 in New Zealand, No. 74 in the UK and No. 117 in the United States.

The album spawned three singles: "R.A.I.D.", "Psyko Funk" and "Walk the Line".

== Critical reception ==
Professional ratings
Review scores
Source	Rating
AllMusic	4/5 stars
The Encyclopedia of Popular Music	3/5 stars
The Rolling Stone Album Guide	1.5/5 stars

Trouser Press wrote: "New Funky Nation is an extraordinarily powerful and uncommon hip-hop LP, a rhythmic soul assault of horns, Boo-Yaa bass and violence-prone street rhymes that have an unsettling ring of truth." The Orlando Sentinel wrote that "the raps aren't as strong as the music ... they try to counter the polish of the sound with street tough talk, but the vocals just aren't lean and mean enough to give their Uzi and body-bag motifs any vibrancy." The Washington Post wrote that "the whole Boo-Yaa package -- their look, their background, their musicianship -- is more memorable than any of their songs, with the exception of 'Don't Mess', which has startling changes of tempo and a simple, irresistible vocal hook: 'Boo-Yaa funkin' it up'."

== Track listing ==
No.	Title	Producer(s)	Length
1.	"Six Bad Brothers"	Joe "The Butcher" Nicolo; Suga Pop	5:00
2.	"Rated R"	The Dust Brothers	5:12
3.	"Don't Mess"	The Dust Brothers	5:12
4.	"New Funky Nation"	Myles John O'Brien	5:57
5.	"Once Upon a Drive-By"	The Dust Brothers	5:50
6.	"T.R.I.B.E."	Nicolo	3:50
7.	"Walk the Line"	O'Brien	6:04
8.	"R.A.I.D."	Boo-Yaa T.R.I.B.E.; Nicolo	4:27
9.	"Psyko Funk"	Tony G.	4:19
10.	"Riot Pump"	The Dust Brothers	5:13
11.	"Pickin' Up Metal"	O'Brien	5:16
Total length:			56:18

Sample credits

- "Six Bad Brothers" contains elements from "Fight the Power" by the Isley Brothers (1975) and "N.T." by Kool & the Gang (1971)
- "Rated R" contains elements from "It's Yours" by T La Rock and Jazzy Jay
- "Don't Mess" contains elements from "Don't Mess with People" by Mandrill (1973)
- "T.R.I.B.E." contains elements from "Sun Is Here" by Sun (1978) and "Ain't We Funkin' Now" by the Brothers Johnson (1978)
- "R.A.I.D." contains elements from "Raid" by Lakeside (1983) and "Groove Me" by King Floyd (1970)
- "Psyko Funk" contains elements from "I'm Chief Kamanawanalea (We're the Royal Macadamia Nuts)" by the Turtles, "Reach Out of the Darkness" by Friend & Lover, "Funky Drummer" by James Brown, "Boogie Shoes" by KC & the Sunshine Band, "Aqua Boogie (A Psychoalphadiscobetabioaquadoloop)" by Parliament

== Personnel ==
Boo-Yaa T.R.I.B.E.

- Ted Devoux – lead vocals
- Paul Devoux – rap vocals
- Roscoe Devoux – vocals
- Danny Devoux – backing vocals, bass, additional guitars
- David Devoux – backing vocals
- Donald DeVoux – backing vocals

Instrumentalists

- Vicki Calhoun – backing vocals (tracks: 2–4)
- John Myles O'Brien – bass (tracks: 1, 7), guitar (tracks: 4, 7), drum programming (track 6)
- Steven Daniells-Silva – guitar (tracks: 1, 6), keyboards (track 6)
- Philip Nowlan – organ (tracks: 1, 4)
- Tony Gonzalez – turntables (tracks: 1, 9)
- Michael S. Simpson – turntables (tracks: 2–3, 5, 10–11)
- Fernando Pullum – trumpet (tracks: 4, 7, 10)
- Scott Mayo – tenor saxophone (tracks: 4, 7, 10)
- Reginald Young – trombone (tracks: 4, 7, 10)
- Angel Luis Figueroa – congas (track 5)
- Andy "Funky Drummer" Kravitz – percussion (tracks: 6, 8)
- Ken Villeneuve – lead & rhythm guitars (track 11)
- Phillip "Fish" Fisher – drums

Technicals

- Kim Buie – A&R, executive producer
- Joseph Mario Nicolo – executive producer, mixing, producer (tracks: 1, 6, 8)
- Steven Daniells-Silva – producer (track 1)
- John King – producer (tracks: 2–3, 5, 10)
- Michael S. Simpson – producer (tracks: 2–3, 5, 10)
- John Myles O'Brien – producer (tracks: 4, 7, 11)
- Tony Gonzalez – producer (track 9)
- Howie Weinberg – mastering
- Jason Roberts – engineering
- Allen Abrahamson – engineering
- Talley Sherwood – engineering
- Holly Ferguson – A&R coordinator
- Richard Evans – album cover design & art direction
- Max Aguilera-Hellweg – photography

== Charts ==
Chart (1990)	Peak position
New Zealand Albums (RMNZ)	33
UK Albums (Official Charts)	74
US Billboard 200	117
US Top R&B/Hip-Hop Albums (Billboard)	33
