= The New Pollution =

Single by Beck

from the album Odelay
- Released: 1997
- Genre: Alternative rock; psychedelic rock; jazz fusion
- Length: 3:39
- Label: DGC
- Songwriters: Beck Hansen; John King; Michael Simpson
- Producers: Beck; Dust Brothers

Beck singles chronology
"Devils Haircut" (1996)	"The New Pollution" (1997)	"Sissyneck" (1997)

Music video
- "The New Pollution" on YouTube

"The New Pollution" is a song by American musician Beck, released in February 1997 by DGC Records as the third single from his fifth album, Odelay (1996). It was written by Beck with John King and Michael Simpson, and produced by Beck with Dust Brothers. The song samples "Venus" by Joe Thomas. In the US, "The New Pollution" peaked at number 78 on the Billboard Hot 100 and number nine on the Billboard Alternative Airplay chart. In Europe, it was a top-10 hit in Iceland, peaking at number nine, and is his highest-charting song in the UK. The music video for the song was directed by Beck himself.

== Critical reception ==
Retrospectively, Justin Chadwick from Albumism named "The New Pollution" one of the "unequivocal standouts" of the Odelay album, describing it as "buoyant" and "exhilarating, pop-friendly fare". David Stubbs from Melody Maker felt the song "is as near to anthemic as Beck gets. Nicking the bassline from The Beatles' 'Taxman', it's shot through with a recurring children's TV piccolo motif and wailing sax. Again, interesting and clever, rather than uplifting or inspirational." A reviewer from Music Week gave it four out of five, adding, "Similar to 'Devils Haircut' in execution, this mellow outing from Odelay should follow its predecessor into the Top 30." Music Week editor Alan Jones called it a gem, adding, "Like the hit 'Devils Haircut', it sounds very tongue in cheek and combines the psychedelic swirl of The Beatles' 'Within You, Without You' with the bass line from 'Taxman', although it doesn't really sound like a Beatles record. It does have their freshness and is very commercial and is sure to score." David Sinclair from The Times viewed it as a "sneaky re-working of that old 'Taxman' riff."

== Music video ==
The accompanying music video for "The New Pollution" was directed by Beck himself. It features 1960s-style dancing and background. The video contains visual references to Serge Gainsbourg's music videos for "Monsieur William" and "Melody", as well as the bands Mötley Crüe and Kraftwerk. The opening scene references The Lawrence Welk Show.

The video features actress Mary Lynn Rajskub.

The music video received nominations for Video of the Year, Best Alternative Video, Best Direction, Best Choreography and Best Art Direction at the 1997 MTV Video Music Awards, winning the latter three.

== Live performances ==
As of April 2026, Beck had performed the song live 608 times, the fourth-most of his songs.

== Track listings ==
- US 12" Vinyl
1. "The New Pollution" [LP Version] - 3:39
2. "The New Pollution" [Remix by Mickey P.] - 4:08
3. "The New Pollution" [Remix by Mkey P. & Mario C.] - 3:49
4. "Lemonade" [Previously Unreleased] - 2:22
5. "Richard's Hairpiece" ["Devil's Haircut" remix by Aphex Twin] - 3:19
- UK CD Pt. 1
1. "The New Pollution" [LP Version] - 3:42
2. "Richard's Hairpiece" [Remix by Aphex Twin] - 3:21
3. "Electric Music and the Summer People" - 4:41
- UK CD Pt. 2
1. "The New Pollution" [LP Version] - 3:42
2. "The New Pollution" [Remix by Mario C. and Mickey P.] - 3:51
3. "Lemonade" - 2:21
- Japanese CD (released as "The New Pollution" and Other Favorites)
1. "The New Pollution" [LP Version] - 3:39
2. "The New Pollution" [Remix by Mickey P.] - 4:08
3. "The New Pollution" [Remix by Mario C. & Mickey P.] - 3:49
4. "Richard's Hairpiece" [Remix by Aphex Twin] - 3:21
5. "Thunderpeel" [Previously Unreleased] - 2:41
  - This version is different from the one on Stereopathetic Soulmanure
6. "Lemonade" [Previously Unreleased] - 2:23
7. ".000.000" [Previously Unreleased] - 5:26
8. "Feather In Your Cap" [Previously Unreleased] - 3:45
  - This version can be found on the SubUrbia soundtrack.

== Personnel ==
- Beck Hansen: Vocals, guitar, bass, clavinet, organ, programming
- The Dust Brothers: Programming
- Written by: Beck/The Dust Brothers

== Charts ==
Chart (1997)	Peak position
Canada Top Singles (RPM)	39
Canada Rock/Alternative (RPM)	1
Iceland (Íslenski Listinn Topp 40)	9
US Billboard Hot 100	78
US Alternative Airplay (Billboard)	9
