= Deadweight (song) =

Single by Beck

from the album A Life Less Ordinary soundtrack and Odelay (Deluxe edition)
- Released: October 6, 1997
- Genre: Alternative rock
- Length: 6:12 (album version); 4:42 (single version)
- Label: London; Geffen
- Songwriter(s): Beck Hansen
- Producer(s): Beck Hansen, The Dust Brothers

Beck singles chronology
| "Jack-Ass" (1997) | "Deadweight" (1997) | "Tropicalia" (1998) |

Music video
- "Deadweight" on YouTube

"Deadweight" is a single by American musician Beck, released as a single from the soundtrack to the 1997 romantic black comedy film A Life Less Ordinary. The song was nominated for Best Song from a Movie at the 1998 MTV Movie Awards but lost to Will Smith's "Men in Black". The song can also be found on the deluxe version of Beck's fifth studio album, Odelay (1996).

== Background ==
Beck recorded "Deadweight" with the Dust Brothers between Odelay and Mutations. It was released on the soundtrack to A Life Less Ordinary at the end of 1997. In contrast with the buoyant, lively melody, Beck adds his own Gram Parsons-style hard-luck lyrics about gambling, Las Vegas, and loneliness. Beck has mentioned that this song was a part of his "Brazilian trilogy", alongside "Tropicalia" and "Missing". Unlike "Tropicalia", a bossa nova song, "Deadweight" uses its Brazilian influence more as part of a larger funky brew. As Beck said in USA Today, "I'm trying to get to a place where this merging of styles is so fluent and natural that you don't notice the different snippets, a musical consciousness where there's no preconceived ideas". An edited version without the synthesizer noise breakdown coda was also put out as a single.

== Structure ==
Beck recorded most of the song by himself, playing bass, keyboards, drum machine, and all the guitars; though the scratching is uncredited, it was most likely one of the Dust Brothers, who produced the track.

== "Erase the Sun" and "SA-5" ==
The remaining two tracks on the single—"Erase the Sun" and "SA-5"—provide direct links to Mutations with lyrical fragments that would end up almost word-for-word in future songs.

== Music video ==
The song's music video was directed by Michel Gondry. It features Beck—who lives in a paradoxical world—working at a desk on the beach, then going on holiday to an office. He eventually ends up at a movie theatre showing A Life Less Ordinary. The video is intercut with scenes from the movie.

== Track listing ==
1. "Deadweight" (edit) - 4:07
2. "Erase the Sun" - 3:16
3. "SA-5" - 1:52

== Personnel ==
- Beck Hansen – vocals, acoustic guitar, electric guitar, bass, organ, mellotron, synthesizer, piano, production
- The Dust Brothers – turntables, drum machine, production

== Charts ==
| Chart (1997–1998) | Peak position |
|---|---|
| Australia (ARIA) | 73 |
| Iceland (Íslenski Listinn Topp 40) | 18 |
| Sweden (Sverigetopplistan) | 60 |
| Scotland (OCC) | 20 |
| UK Singles (OCC) | 23 |
| US Alternative Airplay (Billboard) | 16 |

== Release history ==
| Region | Date | Format(s) | Label(s) | Ref. |
|---|---|---|---|---|
| United States | October 6, 1997 | Alternative radio | London | |
| United Kingdom | October 27, 1997 | 7-inch vinyl; CD; cassette | Geffen | |
