= Hell Yes (Beck song) =

Single by Beck

from the album Guero
- Released: 2005
- Genre: Funk; electro
- Length: 3:17
- Label: Interscope
- Songwriters: Beck, Dust Brothers
- Producers: Beck, Dust Brothers

Beck singles chronology
"Girl" (2005)	"Hell Yes" (2005)	"Nausea" (2006)

Music video
- "Hell Yes" on YouTube

"Hell Yes" is a song by Beck, released as the third and final single from his 2005 album Guero. A remix version by 8-Bit entitled "Ghettochip Malfunction (Hell Yes)" appears on the Hell Yes EP and Guerolito and was released as a single. Christina Ricci provides the female voice in the track. The song samples Ohio Players' "Far East Mississippi".

== Music video ==
The music video for "Hell Yes" features four QRIOs, developed by Sony Japan. The QRIO is designed to carry on conversations, adapt to its environment, and mimic human movements, including dance routines. Shots of Beck performing this song are imposed on the wall behind the QRIOs. At the time of the video shoot, there were only four working QRIOs in the world—all of which appear in this video. The video was directed by Garth Jennings.

== Track listing ==
1. "Ghettochip Malfunction (Hell Yes)" – 2:41
2. "Hell Yes" (album version) – 3:17
3. "Gucci Bag in Flames (Hell Yes)" – 2:41

== Personnel ==
- Beck – vocals, bass guitar, harmonica, vocoder
- Christina Ricci – voice
- The Dust Brothers – production, drums and samples

== See also ==
- QRIO
