= Jack-Ass (song) =

1997 single by Beck

Single by Beck

from the album Odelay
- Released: August 26, 1997
- Studio: The Shop Studio, Arcata
- Genre: Folk; country
- Length: 4:11
- Label: Bong Load; DGC
- Songwriters: Beck Hansen; John King; Michael Simpson
- Producers: Beck Hansen; The Dust Brothers

Beck singles chronology
"Sissyneck" (1997)	"Jack-Ass" (1997)	"Deadweight" (1997)

Music video
- "Jack-Ass" on YouTube

"Jack-Ass" is a single by Beck, taken from the album Odelay (1996). The song is based on a sample of "It's All Over Now, Baby Blue", performed by Them, from their 1966 album Them Again.

The B-side, "Strange Invitation", is a re-recorded version of "Jack-Ass", played on acoustic guitar and strings and forecasts the style Beck would later use on Sea Change in 2002.

== Legacy ==
Insane Clown Posse sampled this song for their 1999 single "Another Love Song", from their album The Amazing Jeckel Brothers, but the sample was cleared with Bob Dylan, the writer of "It's All Over Now, Baby Blue", rather than Beck.

The track is used in an episode of the Chris Morris radio show Blue Jam.

== Track listing ==
=== Original pressing ===
1. "Jack-Ass" (Butch Vig Mix) - 3:25
2. "Feather in Your Cap" - 3:47
3. "Lemonade" - 2:23
4. "Jack-Ass" (Edit Version) - 3:24

=== Alternate pressing ===
1. "Jack-Ass" (Butch Vig Mix) - 3:23
2. "Jack-Ass" (Butch Vig Lowrider Mix) - 4:11
3. "Burro" - 3:11
4. "Strange Invitation" - 4:05
5. "Devil Got My Woman" - 4:34
6. "Brother" - 4:45

== Personnel ==
- Beck Hansen: Vocals, acoustic guitar, electric guitar, bass, electric piano, harmonica, xylophone
- Written by: Beck/The Dust Brothers
- Programmed by: Beck/The Dust Brothers

== Music video ==
The music video for the single was directed by Steve Hanft, and features the Butch Vig mix included on the single rather than the album version. In it, Beck and several other miners are in a black-and-white coal mine. Willie Nelson appears with a dog in a passing mine cart. Later, Beck's character sees a show girl atop a pile of coal that turns into a peacock. At the end of the work shift, the miners emerge into a fully colored world. A fully suited beekeeper waves at the passers-by. It first aired in July 1997.

== Charts ==
Chart (1997)	Peak position
Canadian RPM Alternative 30	10
U.S. Billboard Hot 100	73
U.S. Billboard Modern Rock Tracks	15

== Burro ==
"Burro"

Song by Beck

from the album Stray Blues
- Released: 13 June 2000
- Length: 3:13
- Label: Geffen
- Songwriter: Beck Hansen

"Burro" is the Spanish version of "Jack-Ass". It was released on the 2000 album Stray Blues. Heather Phares of AllMusic called "Burro" "surprisingly straight mariachi".
