= Broken Train =

Song by Beck

from the album Midnite Vultures
- Released: November 23, 1999
- Genre: Alternative rock
- Length: 4:11
- Label: DGC
- Songwriter(s): Beck Hansen
- Producer(s): Beck Hansen; The Dust Brothers; Tony Hoffer; Mickey Petralia

"Broken Train" is a song by the American musician Beck and was released on his 1999 album Midnite Vultures. The song was composed in the key of D-flat major.

== Background ==
Rolling Stone wrote that the song "details anarchy outside the privileged zone".

== Title change ==
The song was originally named "Out of Kontrol", and promos of the album even use that title. During the first concert of the Midnite Vultures on November 1, 1999, Beck explained that he changed it at the last minute because the Chemical Brothers had already used the title.

== Live performances ==
The song was first performed in 1999 during the album's supporting tour. It has not been performed however since June 20, 2003 during Beck's Sea Change tour.

"Broken Train" has been performed a total of 40 times.

== Reception ==
Music Times thought that the song was the sixth best song on the album, and wrote that it "comes off as mechanical, but not in the sense that it is soulless — rather in the sense that we are hearing the unadorned inner workings of the track with none of the edges smoothed out."

Entertainment Weekly called it a " space-age", arena rock song that has "Beck's knack for constantly adding surprising new textures to a tune, almost on a bar-by-bar basis, without ever sounding like he's quite resorted to the kitchen sink."
