= 1997 MTV Video Music Awards =

Award ceremony

- Date: Thursday, September 4, 1997
- Location: Radio City Music Hall, New York, New York
- Country: United States
- Hosted by: Chris Rock
- Most awards: Beck (5)
- Most nominations: Jamiroquai (10)

Television/radio coverage
- Network: MTV
- Produced by: Andy Schuon
- Directed by: Beth McCarthy

The 1997 MTV Video Music Awards aired live on September 4, 1997, honoring the best music videos from June 17, 1996, to June 16, 1997. The show was hosted by Chris Rock at Radio City Music Hall in New York City.

American singer Beck took home the most Moonmen of the night, winning five awards. British acid jazz band Jamiroquai closely followed, though, taking home four awards, including the coveted Video of the Year prize. The only other multiple winner that night was British dance outfit The Prodigy, which took home the American and European Viewer's Choice awards – making them the first act in VMA history to win two Viewer's Choice awards in the same year.

As for nominations, Jamiroquai dominated the field with ten nominations for their video "Virtual Insanity." In second place was Beck, who received seven mentions: five for "The New Pollution" and two for "Devils Haircut." Lastly, Nine Inch Nails came in third with five nominations for "The Perfect Drug." Unlike Beck and Jamiroquai, Nine Inch Nails went home empty-handed that night.

== Background ==
MTV announced on July 7 that the 1997 Video Music Awards would be held at Radio City Music Hall on September 4 and hosted by Chris Rock. Nominees were announced on July 22. MTV noted prior to the show that performances would be "more heavily choreographed" than in previous ceremonies. The ceremony broadcast was preceded by the 1997 MTV Video Music Awards Opening Act. Hosted by Kurt Loder and Tabitha Soren with reports from Serena Altschul, Chris Connelly, Abbie Kearse, and John Norris, the broadcast featured red carpet interviews, a pre-taped interview with Mariah Carey, the world premiere of Janet Jackson's music video for "Got 'til It's Gone," and performances from Foo Fighters and The Mighty Mighty Bosstones. The Foo Fighters' performance was notable for guitarist Pat Smear's announcement that he was leaving the band and Franz Stahl's debut as a band member. The theme of this year's show takes place in a Japanese-style theme, with numerous screens abroad. The nomination packages also featured Japanese like language, although it is unclear what they actually mean though.

== Performances ==
List of musical performances
Artist(s)	Song(s)
MTV.com and MTV area of America Online cybercast
Meredith Brooks	
Pre-show
Foo Fighters	"Monkey Wrench"
The Mighty Mighty Bosstones	"The Impression That I Get"
Foo Fighters	"Everlong"
Main show
Puff Daddy	"Mo Money Mo Problems" (featuring Mase) "I'll Be Missing You" (featuring Faith Evans, 112, and Sting)
Jewel	"Angel Standing By"
The Prodigy	"Breathe" (Note: Live from Chelmsford, England)
The Wallflowers; Bruce Springsteen	"One Headlight"
Lil' Kim; Da Brat; Missy Elliott; Lisa "Left-Eye" Lopes; Angie Martinez	"Not Tonight (Ladies Night Remix)"
U2	"Please"
Beck	"The New Pollution"
Spice Girls	"Say You'll Be There"
Jamiroquai	"Virtual Insanity"
Marilyn Manson	"The Beautiful People"

== Presenters ==
=== Pre-show ===
- Chris Connelly and Serena Altschul – presented Best Rock Video and announced the winners of the professional categories and Breakthrough Video
- Dave Matthews – introduced the Foo Fighters who played atop the Radio City Music Hall marquee outside the hall at street level

=== Main show ===
- Cindy Crawford and Pat Smear – presented Best Group Video
- Martha Stewart and Busta Rhymes – presented Best Dance Video
- Dennis Franz – appeared in vignettes about Viewer's Choice nominees
- Madonna – talked about the death of Diana, Princess of Wales, and introduced The Prodigy
- Kevin Bacon and Janeane Garofalo – presented Best Video from a Film
- Adam Sandler and Meredith Brooks – presented Best Alternative Video
- Wu-Tang Clan – introduced Lil' Kim, Missy Elliott, Angie Martinez, Da Brat and Lisa Lopes
- Elton John – announced that MTV would donate a portion of the ceremony's proceeds to the Diana, Princess of Wales Memorial Fund, and presented Best New Artist in a Video
- Dermot Mulroney and John Popper – presented Best Male Video (and also announced Beck's win for Best Direction in a Video)
- Mariah Carey – presented the Video Vanguard Award to LL Cool J
- No Doubt – presented Best R&B Video
- Mike Myers – introduced Beck
- Sheryl Crow – chatted with The Rolling Stones via satellite, then introduced the next presenters
- Fiona Apple and Chris Tucker – introduced the International Viewer's Choice Awards winners
- Maxwell, Dave Matthews and Boyd Tinsley – presented Best Rap Video
- Janet Jackson – presented the Video Vanguard Award to Mark Romanek
- Naomi Campbell – introduced Jamiroquai
- David Arquette and Lisa Marie Presley – presented Viewer's Choice
- Blackstreet – presented Best Female Video
- Will Smith – presented Video of the Year
- Daria and Jane – appeared before the final commercial break to sarcastically praise the show

== Winners and nominees ==
Winners are in bold text.

Video of the Year	Best Male Video
**Jamiroquai – "Virtual Insanity"**; Beck – "The New Pollution"; Jewel – "You Were Meant for Me"; Nine Inch Nails – "The Perfect Drug"; No Doubt – "Don't Speak"	**Beck – "Devils Haircut"**; Babyface – "Every Time I Close My Eyes"; R. Kelly – "I Believe I Can Fly"; Will Smith – "Men in Black"
Best Female Video	Best Group Video
**Jewel – "You Were Meant for Me"**; Erykah Badu – "On & On"; Toni Braxton – "Un-Break My Heart"; Meredith Brooks – "Bitch"; Paula Cole – "Where Have All the Cowboys Gone?"	**No Doubt – "Don't Speak"**; Blur – "Song 2"; Counting Crows – "A Long December"; Dave Matthews Band – "Crash into Me"; The Wallflowers – "One Headlight"
Best New Artist in a Video	Best Rock Video
**Fiona Apple – "Sleep to Dream"**; Meredith Brooks – "Bitch"; Hanson – "MMMBop"; Jamiroquai – "Virtual Insanity"; The Wallflowers – "One Headlight"	**Aerosmith – "Falling in Love (Is Hard on the Knees)"**; Foo Fighters – "Monkey Wrench"; Marilyn Manson – "The Beautiful People"; Dave Matthews Band – "Crash into Me"; Rage Against the Machine – "People of the Sun"
Best R&B Video	Best Rap Video
**Puff Daddy (featuring Faith Evans and 112) – "I'll Be Missing You"**; Babyface with Stevie Wonder – "How Come, How Long"; Erykah Badu – "On & On"; Blackstreet (featuring Dr. Dre) – "No Diggity"; Toni Braxton – "Un-Break My Heart"	**The Notorious B.I.G. – "Hypnotize"**; Blackstreet (featuring Dr. Dre) – "No Diggity"; Dr. Dre – "Been There, Done That"; Missy "Misdemeanor" Elliott – "The Rain (Supa Dupa Fly)"
Best Dance Video	Best Alternative Video
**Spice Girls – "Wannabe"**; The Chemical Brothers – "Block Rockin' Beats"; Freak Nasty – "Da' Dip"; The Prodigy – "Breathe"	**Sublime – "What I Got"**; Beck – "The New Pollution"; Blur – "Song 2"; Foo Fighters – "Monkey Wrench"; Nine Inch Nails – "The Perfect Drug"
Best Video from a Film	Breakthrough Video
**Will Smith – "Men in Black" (from Men in Black)**; Iggy Pop – "Lust for Life" (from Trainspotting); R. Kelly – "I Believe I Can Fly" (from Space Jam); Bruce Springsteen – "Secret Garden" (from Jerry Maguire)	**Jamiroquai – "Virtual Insanity"**; The Chemical Brothers – "Setting Sun"; Daft Punk – "Da Funk"; Missy "Misdemeanor" Elliott – "The Rain (Supa Dupa Fly)"; Radiohead – "Paranoid Android"
Best Direction in a Video	Best Choreography in a Video
**Beck – "The New Pollution" (Director: Beck Hansen)**; Missy "Misdemeanor" Elliott – "The Rain (Supa Dupa Fly)" (Director: Hype Williams); Jamiroquai – "Virtual Insanity" (Director: Jonathan Glazer); Nine Inch Nails – "The Perfect Drug" (Director: Mark Romanek); The Smashing Pumpkins – "The End Is the Beginning Is the End" (Directors: Joel Schumacher, Jonathan Dayton and Valerie Faris)	**Beck – "The New Pollution" (Choreographer: Peggy Hickey)**; Cibo Matto – "Sugar Water" (Choreographer: Michel Gondry); Dr. Dre – "Been There, Done That" (Choreographers: Fatima and Swoop); Jamiroquai – "Virtual Insanity" (Choreographer: Jason Kay); Will Smith – "Men in Black" (Choreographer: Stretch)
Best Special Effects in a Video	Best Art Direction in a Video
**Jamiroquai – "Virtual Insanity" (Special Effects: Jonathan Glazer and Sean Broughton)**; Eels – "Novocaine for the Soul" (Special Effects: Ashley Clemens); Marilyn Manson – "The Beautiful People" (Special Effects: D.A.V.E. and Panic & Bob); The Smashing Pumpkins – "The End Is the Beginning Is the End" (Special Effects: Chris Staves, Nigel Randall, Edson Williams and the Brothers Strause); Will Smith – "Men in Black" (Special Effects: Paul Griffin, Alan Rosenfield and Wade Howie)	**Beck – "The New Pollution" (Art Director: K. K. Barrett)**; Jamiroquai – "Virtual Insanity" (Art Director: John Bramble); Marilyn Manson – "The Beautiful People" (Art Director: Ken Baird); Nine Inch Nails – "The Perfect Drug" (Art Director: Tom Foden)
Best Editing in a Video	Best Cinematography in a Video
**Beck – "Devils Haircut" (Editor: Hank Corwin)**; Jamiroquai – "Virtual Insanity" (Editors: Jonathan Glazer and John McManus); The Smashing Pumpkins – "The End Is the Beginning Is the End" (Editor: Hal Honigsberg); The Wallflowers – "One Headlight" (Editor: Einar Thorsteinsson)	**Jamiroquai – "Virtual Insanity" (Director of Photography: Stephen Keith-Roach)**; Eels – "Novocaine for the Soul" (Director of Photography: Jeff Cronenweth); Nine Inch Nails – "The Perfect Drug" (Director of Photography: Jeff Cronenweth); The Smashing Pumpkins – "The End Is the Beginning Is the End" (Director of Photography: Declan Quinn)
Viewer's Choice	International Viewer's Choice: MTV Asia
**The Prodigy – "Breathe"**; Jewel – "You Were Meant for Me"; Puff Daddy (featuring Faith Evans and 112) – "I'll Be Missing You"; Spice Girls – "Say You'll Be There"; The Wallflowers – "One Headlight"	**Eraserheads – "Ang Huling El Bimbo"**; Dewa 19 – "Kirana"; Joey Boy – "Fun Fun Fun"; KRU – "Fanatik"; Lee Seung-hwan – "Family"
International Viewer's Choice: MTV Australia	International Viewer's Choice: MTV Brasil
**Silverchair – "Freak"**; Human Nature – "Don't Say Goodbye"; Powderfinger – "Living Type"; Savage Garden – "To the Moon and Back"; Spiderbait – "Calypso"	**Skank – "É uma Partida de Futebol"**; Fernanda Abreu – "Kátia Flávia"; Angra – "Make Believe"; Baba Cósmica – "Uma Pedra no Meu Caminho"; Barão Vermelho – "Amor Meu Grande Amor"; Carlinhos Brown – "A Namorada"; Camisa de Vênus – "O Ponteiro Tá Subindo"; Cidade Negra – "Firmamento"; Kid Abelha – "Te Amo pra Sempre"; Lagoa – "Revista de Mulher Pelada"; Maria do Relento – "Conhece o Mário"; Nenhum de Nós – "Vou Deixar Que Você Se Vá"; Os Ostras – "Uma, Duas ou Três (Punheta)"; Os Paralamas do Sucesso – "La Bella Luna"; Pato Fu – "Água"; Planet Hemp – "Dezdasseis/Dig Dig Dig (Hempa)"; Raimundos – "Puteiro em João Pessoa"; Lulu Santos – "Aviso aos Navegantes"; Sepultura – "Ratamahatta"; Virgulóides – "Bagulho no Bumba"
International Viewer's Choice: MTV Europe	International Viewer's Choice: MTV India
**The Prodigy – "Breathe"**; Daft Punk – "Around the World"; Jamiroquai – "Virtual Insanity"; Radiohead – "Paranoid Android"; Skunk Anansie – "Hedonism (Just Because You Feel Good)"	**Asha Bhosle – "O Mere Sona Re"**; Lucky Ali – "O Sanam"; Amitabh Bachchan – "Eir Bir Phatte"; Colonial Cousins – "Krishna"; Daler Mehndi – "Dardi Rab Rab Kardi"
International Viewer's Choice: MTV Japan	International Viewer's Choice: MTV Latin America
**Chara – "Yasashii Kimochi"**; Air – "Hair Do"; Denki Groove – "Shangi-La"; Scha Dara Parr – "Otona Ni Nattemo"; The Yellow Monkey – "Rakuen"	**Café Tacuba – "Chilanga Banda"**; Azul Violeta – "Volveré a Empezar"; Control Machete – "¿Comprendes Mendes?"; Fito Páez – "Cadáver Exquisito"; Aleks Syntek y la Gente Normal – "Sin Ti"
International Viewer's Choice: MTV Mandarin	
**Mavis Fan – "Bartender Angel"**; Jeff Chang – "Affection"; Chyi Chin – "Cliff"; Valen Hsu – "If Cloud Knows"; Aaron Kwok – "Share My Love"; Wu Bai & China Blue – "End of Love"
Michael Jackson Video Vanguard Award
**LL Cool J** **Mark Romanek**

== Artists with multiple wins and nominations ==
Artists who received multiple awards
Wins	Artist
5	Beck
4	Jamiroquai
2	The Prodigy

Artists who received multiple nominations
Nominations	Artist
10	Jamiroquai
7	Beck
5	Nine Inch Nails
4	The Smashing Pumpkins
4	The Wallflowers
4	Will Smith
3	Jewel
3	Marilyn Manson
3	Missy Elliott
3	The Prodigy
2	Babyface
2	Blackstreet
2	Blur
2	Daft Punk
2	Dave Matthews Band
2	Dr. Dre
2	Eels
2	Erykah Badu
2	Foo Fighters
2	Meredith Brooks
2	No Doubt
2	Puff Daddy
2	Radiohead
2	R. Kelly
2	Spice Girls
2	The Chemical Brothers
2	Toni Braxton

== Music Videos with multiple wins and nominations ==
Music Videos that received multiple awards
Wins	Artist	Music Video
4	Jamiroquai	"Virtual Insanity"
3	Beck	"The New Pollution"
2	Beck	"Devils Haircut"
2	The Prodigy	"Breathe"

Music Videos that received multiple nominations
Nominations	Artist	Music Video
10	Jamiroquai	"Virtual Insanity"
5	Beck	"The New Pollution"
5	Nine Inch Nails	"The Perfect Drug"
4	The Smashing Pumpkins	"The End Is the Beginning Is the End"
4	The Wallflowers	"One Headlight"
4	Will Smith	"Men in Black"
3	Jewel	"You Were Meant for Me"
3	Marilyn Manson	"The Beautiful People"
3	Missy Elliott	"The Rain (Supa Dupa Fly)"
3	The Prodigy	"Breathe"
2	Beck	"Devils Haircut"
2	Blackstreet (featuring Dr. Dre)	"No Diggity"
2	Blur	"Song 2"
2	Dave Matthews Band	"Crash into Me"
2	Dr. Dre	"Been There, Done That"
2	Eels	"Novocaine for the Soul"
2	Erykah Badu	"On & On"
2	Foo Fighters	"Monkey Wrench"
2	Meredith Brooks	"Bitch"
2	No Doubt	"Don't Speak"
2	Puff Daddy (featuring Faith Evans and 112)	"I'll Be Missing You"
2	Radiohead	"Paranoid Android"
2	R. Kelly	"I Believe I Can Fly"
2	Toni Braxton	"Un-Break My Heart"

== See also ==
- 1997 MTV Europe Music Awards
