= Devils Haircut =

Single by Beck

from the album Odelay
- B-side: "Lloyd Price Express"; "Clock"
- Released: Nov 1996
- Genre: Alternative rock; funk rock
- Length: 3:14
- Label: DGC
- Songwriters: Beck Hansen; John King; Michael Simpson
- Producers: Beck; The Dust Brothers

Beck singles chronology
"Where It's At" (1996)	"Devils Haircut" (1996)	"The New Pollution" (1997)

Music video
- "Devils Haircut" on YouTube

"Devils Haircut" is a song by the American musician Beck, released in November 1996 by DGC Records as the second single from his fifth album, Odelay (1996). Both co-written and co-produced by Beck, the song peaked at number 94 on the US Billboard Hot 100, number 23 on the Billboard Modern Rock Tracks chart and number 22 on the UK Singles Chart. Its music video was directed by Mark Romanek and filmed in New York City. In the end of 1996, Melody Maker ranked "Devils Haircut" number six in their list of "Singles of the Year".

== Critical reception ==
Justin Chadwick from Albumism named "Devils Haircut" one of the "unequivocal standouts" of the Odelay album, describing it as "rollicking, breaks-driven" and "exhilarating, pop-friendly fare". Victoria Segal from Melody Maker wrote, "The original "Devil's Haircut" is the Beck we all know, love and hope doesn't move in next door with his weird pets and garden sculptures. It starts like a Sixties stripper bar band [...] and goes on to puree hip hop, blues and lunacy into one springy pop tune while Mr Hansen rambles space-cake poetry about mouthwash and briefcases over the top."

After the song was ranked number six on the magazine's "Singles of the Year" list in December 1996, they added, "Rickety hip hop propping up a twisted R&B tune, stabs of country and electro, ridiculously abstract lyrics which somehow made sense. Novelty item? Inventive delight." Music Week gave it a score of four out of five, viewing it as "double bass-heavy eccentricity with a definite commercial edge from the talented US singer/songwriter." The reviewer added, "This one sticks in the mind." David Sinclair from The Times declared it as "a typically aberrant mixture of beatbox pop and punk poetry from the gifted Californian oddball."

== Music video ==
The accompanying music video for the song is directed by American filmmaker and photographer Mark Romanek. It features Beck walking through various New York City locations, wearing cowboy attire and carrying a boombox. Visualist Ash Beck created the video billboards of Beck on Wall Street and the setups for the action freezes and the camera zooms in on Beck in tableau. Later the camera zooms in on spies that have been following Beck the whole time. The video has references to the films Midnight Cowboy and The 400 Blows.

At the 1997 MTV Video Music Awards, Beck won a total of five awards. Three were for "The New Pollution" and "Devils Haircut" won two: Best Editing and Best Male Video.

The video for "Devils Haircut" was later made available on YouTube in 2009 and had generated more than 13 million views as of August 2025.

== Samples ==
As is common with his Odelay-era songs, "Devils Haircut" is driven by a number of samples: the drums in the choruses and drum breaks come from Pretty Purdie's "Soul Drums"; the drumbeat during the verses comes from Them's cover of James Brown's "Out of Sight"; and the guitar riff was taken from another Them track, "I Can Only Give You Everything" (written by Scott and Coulter), replayed by Beck rather than sampled.

== Legacy ==
In December 1996, Melody Maker ranked "Devils Haircut" number six in their list of "Singles of the Year". In 2003, Q Magazine ranked it number 467 in their list of the "1001 Best Songs Ever". In the same year, English music journalist Paul Morley included it in his list of "Greatest Pop Single of All Time".

== Track listings ==
- 7"
1. "Devils Haircut"
2. "Lloyd Price Express"
- 12"
1. A1 "Devils Haircut" (LP Version) (3:13)
2. A2 "Devils Haircut" (Dark And Lovely) (3:38)
3. A3 "Devils Haircut" (American Wasteland) (2:43)
4. B1 "Where It's At" (Lloyd Price Express) (4:57)
5. B2 "Clock"(2:43)
- CD #1
1. "Devils Haircut" [LP Version]
2. "Devils Haircut" [Remix by Noel Gallagher]
3. "Groovy Sunday" [Remix by Mike Simpson]
4. "Trouble All My Days"
- CD #2
1. "Devils Haircut" [LP Version]
2. "Dark and Lovely" [Remix by Dust Brothers]
3. "American Wasteland" [Remix by Mickey P.]
4. ".000.000"

== Personnel ==
- Beck: lead and backing vocals, electric guitar, bass, harmonica, organ, drum samples
- The Dust Brothers: turntables, drum samples
- Written by Beck/The Dust Brothers
- Programmed by Beck/The Dust Brothers

== B-sides and remixes ==
"Devils Haircut" was released with a number of B-sides, which included many remixes:

CD #1 includes two remixes. One by Noel Gallagher of Oasis, and the other by Mike Simpson of The Dust Brothers. The former adds a roaring guitar, emphasized over all other instruments on the track while the latter is a more jazzy take on the song, packed with added percussion and jazz horns.

CD #2 includes "Dark and Lovely", another sample-laden Dust Brothers remix, and "American Wasteland", by Mickey P, which transforms the song into a fast, hardcore punk style song.

Both CDs had one original B-side in addition to the remixes. CD #1 had "Trouble All My Days", an early song from 1993 which is characterized by deep, distorted vocals and Beck's thrashing his loosely tuned strings. "Trouble All My Days" had been featured on "Pay No Mind (Snoozer)", Golden Feelings and two other releases prior to its inclusion on "Devils Haircut" CD #1.

CD #2 features "000.000," a previously unreleased song with a strange, minimalistic instrumental background and difficult to discern lyrics. "000.000" was also released on "The New Pollution".

Another remix, "Richard's Hairpiece", was done courtesy of Aphex Twin, in which the riff is removed, and Beck's vocals are sped up to the extent that his voice is extremely high-pitched. This remix was not included on either CD version of "Devils Haircut", because of Aphex Twin's delay in making it, but it was included on the subsequent CD for "The New Pollution".

== Charts ==
Chart (1996–97)	Peak position
Australia (ARIA)	84
Canada Alternative 30 (RPM)	19
Europe (Eurochart Hot 100)	58
Scotland (OCC)	19
UK Singles (OCC)	22
UK Airplay (Music Week)	42
US Billboard Hot 100	94
US Modern Rock Tracks (Billboard)	23
US Cash Box Top 100	88
