= Gary Wilson (musician) =

American musician and performance artist (born 1953)

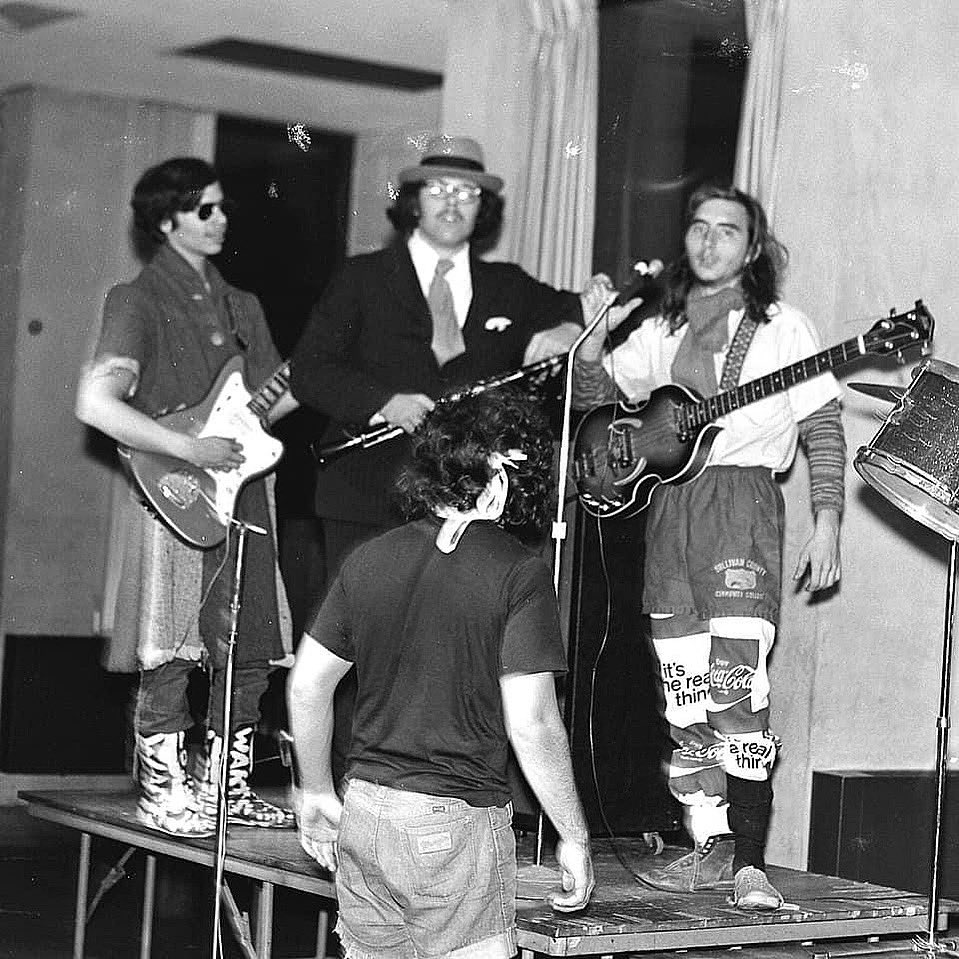
- Wilson (far right) and his band The (Endicott) Blind Dates in 1971

Background information
- Born: Gary Wilson; October 23, 1953 (age 72); Endicott, New York, U.S.
- Origin: Endicott, New York, U.S.
- Genres: New wave; rock; funk; jazz; lounge; experimental; avant garde
- Instruments: Vocals, guitar, keyboards, bass, drums, percussion, cello, upright bass, electric sitar, music organ
- Years active: 1965–1981; 2004–present
- Labels: Cry Baby Records; Motel Records; Stones Throw Records; Human Ear Music; Western Vinyl; Cleopatra Records; Feeding Tube Records
- Formerly of: The Blind Dates, Donnie Finnell & Company East
- Website: www.sixpointfour.com

Gary Wilson (born October 23, 1953) is an American experimental musician and performance artist most notable for his 1977 album You Think You Really Know Me.

== Biography ==
=== Early life ===
Born in Endicott, New York, Wilson, whose father worked for IBM during the day and by night played stand-up bass in a lounge band, was a self-taught musician and musical prodigy, being proficient in guitar, bass, drums, piano and cello by the time he entered grade school.

At age 10, Wilson joined his school band, playing stand-up bass. The following year, he wrote his first song. At 12, Wilson started acquiring tape machines and began recording songs in his parents' basement. Around this time, he attended The Beatles' 1965 Shea Stadium concert. About a year later, he began playing keyboards in a band called Lord Fuzz. They cut a single when he was in eighth grade. The group earned a spot on a bill opening for The 1910 Fruitgum Company. When the band's lead singer left, Wilson took over vocals and songwriting.

In 1969, Wilson discovered the music of aleatoric composer John Cage. When sought out, Cage invited the 14-year-old musician into his home to discuss and critique music for several days. Wilson was also given advice by the composer. Wilson's songs became increasingly experimental at this point.

Upon graduation from high school in 1970, he moved to New York City for several weeks, but quickly returned to his parents' home in Endicott and began playing lounge music on the side, just as his father had.

=== You Think You Really Know Me ===
Wilson went to Albert Grossman's Bearsville Studios in Woodstock, New York in 1976, where he recorded versions of "6.4 = Make Out", "Chromium Bitch", "Groovy Girls", and "I Want To Lose Control". He eventually decided that he would prefer to record at his familiar home studio and finished recording You Think You Really Know Me, his first album, in his parents' basement. On this recording, Wilson sometimes played solo and was other times accompanied by a backing band, The Blind Dates. He pressed, distributed, funded and released the album himself. Wilson pressed 300 copies in 1977 and a further 300 copies in 1979. In 1991, Cry Baby Records re-released the album, pressing about 1000 copies.

His 1970s concert performances were cited as bizarre and outrageous, a "show that included cellophane, duct tape, bed sheets, fake blood, flour, and milk." So outlandish were the shows that often they would have their electricity cut in attempts to get them to leave the stage. After receiving a small amount of radio play, Wilson decided to try and pursue a record deal and moved to California in 1978. There he recorded three discs, "In the Midnight Hour"/"When I Spoke of Love" (1978), Forgotten Lovers E.P. (1979) and "Invasion of Privacy" (1980).

=== Rediscovery and documentary ===
After a 1981 American tour, he retired from the experimental music scene and dropped off the public radar. Wilson then lapsed into obscurity until around 1996, when Beck was heard citing him as an influence in concerts, at award ceremonies, and on his album, Odelay. Beck also namechecked the musician in his hit single "Where It's At": "Passin' the dutchie from coast to coast/like my man Gary Wilson rocks the most." Around the same time, he was cited by the people behind Sub Pop Records as a major influence on their company.

In the early 2000s, Motel Records began a search to find the reclusive musician, but were unsuccessful (even after hiring a private detective). He was eventually found through contacting ex-band members. He was nearly 50 years old, working part-time at The Jolar Cinema adult theater, playing keyboard in a weekly jazz act called Donnie Finnell & Company East at the Rancho Bernardino Lounge and living with his girlfriend (an experimental artist who had studied at UCSD in the 1980s) in San Diego. He gave Motel Records his permission to repress You Think You Really Know Me, and also offered to play a handful of shows to promote the rerelease.

On May 16, 2002, Wilson returned to the stage after a 20-year absence, playing two shows at Joe's Pub in downtown Manhattan. A documentary about Wilson's career and his return to the public stage was filmed by Michael Wolk, titled You Think You Really Know Me: The Gary Wilson Story. The film recorded the musician's long and emotional train ride (due to his fear of flying from a past tour. His fear originates from his face being swollen after a flight for a show/interview) from the west coast back to his native New York for his first concert in decades. The film was screened at several theaters in 2005, and was released on home video by Plexifilm in June 2008. Wilson said attending the film's premier at the Lincoln Center in New York was "one of the highlights of my life."

Motel Records soon after put out Forgotten Lovers, a collection of singles, B-sides, rare and unreleased songs dating back to 1974. In 2004, Wilson released Mary Had Brown Hair on Stones Throw Records, his first album of original material in almost 30 years. In 2005 he played instruments and co-produced "Rain of Earth" as one of the 'Stones Throw Singers' on a tribute album to Bruce Haack titled Dimension Mix. In 2006, his website stated that a greatest hits album was in the works, supposedly to feature tracks from You Think You Really Know Me and Forgotten Lovers; however, no further plans for the album have been revealed and it may have been scrapped. Wilson continues to occasionally perform live, touring Europe twice with the Austin Blind Dates, and usually playing in California, where he resides.

According to Wilson's MySpace account, the musician resided in San Diego, California. As of mid 2008, his lounge act band was still together, playing their regular Friday and Saturday night slot at Bistro 221 in Escondido, as well as playing for-hire at special events and country clubs, covering songs by Nat King Cole, Lou Rawls, Wayne Newton, Johnny Mathis, etc. He also stated that he had recently come back in to email contact with the infamous "Linda" featured in many of his songs. Although they were able to resolve some old issues, the woman is now married and Wilson said of the situation, "I don't think it's cool to get between people."

=== 2000s–2020s ===
In May 2008, Wilson's website announced that a new album, Lisa Wants To Talk To You, was in the works. The record was set to be released on Human Ear Music on August 15, 2008 but the release was delayed for unknown reasons until September 15. Western Vinyl released Gary Wilson's new album Electric Endicott in the fall of 2010. The album is available on CD, vinyl, and MP3. To promote his new album, Wilson performed on the October 27, 2010 episode of Late Night with Jimmy Fallon with members of the Roots acting as his backing band. In July 2011 Stones Throw Records released a direct-to-vinyl live recording from a performance earlier that year.

Wilson was slated in November 2011 to release a new digital album, "Feel the Beat," on Tip Records, a music-business incubator created by rock critic Robert Duncan as an exploratory arm of Duncan/Channon. A limited number of copies are to be released on CD and vinyl as well. In 2012, Wilson was featured on the song "Sweden" from rapper/producer Pyramid Vritra's album "Pyramid", and in 2013 he was featured on the song "Sandy Kissed Gary Wilson Last Night" from production duo They Hate Change's album "Today."

In May 2013, Wilson made his first appearance outside the US for a European tour with The Blind Dates of TX playing the Netherlands, Germany, Spain, UK, Belgium, and the Villette Sonique Festival in Paris. Wilson and the TX Blind Dates returned abroad for a second European tour in 2014 where they played Czech Republic, Germany, France, Belgium, and headlined Sunday night at the OFF Fest in Katowice, Poland. The touring band consisted of Patrick Healy (percussion, vocals), Jason “Chef” Pittman (drums), Sam Vandelinder (guitar, organ, synthesizer), Paul D. Millar (bass guitar, synthesizer), and T.W. Bond (keyboards).

In 2014, Electric Six recorded a cover of "Gary's in the Park" as part of a pledge package for their Absolute Treasure Kickstarter campaign. The cover was subsequently released online.

In January 2014, Wilson and long-time acquaintance R. Stevie Moore shared the same stage for two nights in Brooklyn, NY., when both were invited as guest artists at Issue Project Room.

In 2015, Wilson made a surprise guest appearance on Jimmy Kimmel Live! during a performance by Earl Sweatshirt and BadBadNotGood. Early that year, Earl sampled Wilson's song "You Were Too Good to Be True" on his song "Grief" from the album I Don't Like Shit, I Don't Go Outside.

In 2019, Wilson and R. Stevie Moore collaborated on the album Fake News Trending, which featured Jason Falkner, Jad Fair, Ryan Sinnott of The Distillers and Pall Jenkins. They also released a single called "Hey Gary (Have You Seen My Girl)" with the album.

Wilson featured on the Frost Children single "Mayfly" in 2022.

In 2023, Gary Wilson released "The Marshmallow Man."

== Discography ==
=== Albums ===
- Another Galaxy (1974)
- You Think You Really Know Me (1977, reissued 1991 and 2002)
- Forgotten Lovers (2003, reissued 2011 on vinyl)
- Mary Had Brown Hair (2004)
- Lisa Wants To Talk To You (2008)
- Electric Endicott (2010)
- Feel the Beat (2011)
- Alone With Gary Wilson (2015)
- It's Friday Night with Gary Wilson (2016)
- It's Christmas Time with Gary Wilson (2016)
- Let's Go to Outer Space (2017)
- The King of Endicott (2019)
- Fake News Trending (2019) (with R. Stevie Moore)
- Tormented (2020)
- The Marshmallow Man (2023)
- A Beautiful Bliss (2024)
- Come On Mary (2025)

=== Singles ===
- Dream(s)/Soul Travel (1973)
- Another Galaxy/Softly the Water Flows (1973–1974)
- In the Midnight Hour/When I Spoke of Love (1978)
- Forgotten Lovers E.P. (1979)
- Invasion of Privacy (double 7") (1980)
- This Is Why I Wear My Wedding Gown E.P. (1983)
- Newark Valley (2004)
- 6.4 = Make Out (demo version) (2004)
- My Eyes Are Closed/My Dream Is Yours (Flexi, 7", Single Sided, Blue, Ltd Numbered) (2011)
- Sea Cruise (7" Ltd) (Rita Records) (2014)
- When Mary Comes Home Tonight (2016)
- Hey Gary (Have You Seen My Girl) (2019) (with R. Stevie Moore)
- Kiss Me Once And I'll Kiss You Twice (2024)
