= Midnite Vultures =

Studio album by Beck
- Released: November 15, 1999 (international); November 16, 1999 (US)
- Recorded: July 1998–June 1999
- Studios: Soft Studios and PCP Labs (Los Angeles)
- Genres: Funk rock; R&B; alternative rock; hip hop; disco
- Length: 58:52
- Labels: DGC; Bong Load
- Producers: Beck Hansen; The Dust Brothers; Tony Hoffer; Mickey Petralia

Beck chronology
| Mutations (1998) | Midnite Vultures (1999) | Stray Blues (2000) |

Singles from Midnite Vultures
- 1. "Sexx Laws" Released: October 25, 1999; 2. "Mixed Bizness" Released: March 7, 2000; 3. "Nicotine & Gravy" Released: July 2000

Midnite Vultures is the seventh studio album by American musician Beck, released on November 16, 1999, by DGC Records. While similar to most of Beck's previous albums in its exploration of widely varying styles, it did not achieve the same blockbuster success as his breakthrough album Odelay, but was still critically acclaimed and commercially successful.

== Recording ==
Working titles for the album included Zatyricon (the name of a song released in 2000 as a B-side on the "Nicotine & Gravy" single and later included on the Beck EP) and I Can Smell the V.D. in the Club Tonight (a line from "Milk & Honey").

== Influences ==
Several songs were directly inspired by other songs: "Get Real Paid" features a spiraling sequencer motif reminiscent of Kraftwerk's "Home Computer"; a synth breakdown in "Milk & Honey" echoes a similar riff in Grandmaster Flash and the Furious Five's "The Message"; "Beautiful Way" came about after listening to The Velvet Underground's "Countess from Hong Kong"; and "Debra" was inspired by both Prince's song "Adore" and the David Bowie song "Win".

== Release ==
Midnite Vultures reached number 34 in the US, where it went gold, and also hit number 19 in the UK. As of July 2008, Midnite Vultures has sold 743,000 copies in the United States.

The first promotional shows for the album came in late 1999, including a headlining performance at the first Coachella festival on October 9 alongside The Chemical Brothers, Rage Against the Machine and Tool.

Beck had also appeared on the Saturday Night Live episode (dated December 4), The Tonight Show with Jay Leno, and the VH1! Fashion Show.

During the following year Beck continued to tour, playing in the U.S., Japan, and at large European festivals such as Bizarre Festival, Reading and Leeds Festival and more, playing about 80 shows from January '00 until September '00. The "Vultures" tour was also the last tour featuring DJ Swamp as a part of Beck's touring band, which he had been a part of since 1997.

The first 500,000 copies came in a digipak.

A thirty-second segment of "Beautiful Way" has been bundled with Microsoft’s Windows ME operating system as a demo, or “sample” song for Windows Media Player 7, under the name "beck.asf". The song showcased the Media Player's Internet integration by displaying a clickable image link.

== Critical reception ==
Professional ratings
Aggregate scores
| Source | Rating |
|---|---|
| Metacritic | 83/100 |
Review scores
| Source | Rating |
| AllMusic | 3/5 stars |
| Alternative Press | 5/5 |
| Entertainment Weekly | A− |
| The Guardian | 3/5 stars |
| Los Angeles Times | 4/4 stars |
| NME | 8/10 |
| Pitchfork | 8.5/10 |
| Q | 4/5 stars |
| Rolling Stone | 4/5 stars |
| Select | 5/5 |

Midnite Vultures was praised by most critics, and the album holds a score of 83 at Metacritic, which assigns a normalized rating out of 100 to reviews from mainstream critics, indicating "universal acclaim". Jon Pareles of Rolling Stone remarked that on Midnite Vultures, Beck "plays the insider, riding the executive plane through the good life with every need fulfilled." Richard Cromelin of the Los Angeles Times wrote that he gives the album "a cinematic richness, depth and detail with an array of mutations and surprises, from banjo hoedown to electronic effects". The NME felt that the album, while narrower in scope than Odelay, is "more immediate in impact".

Q praised Midnite Vultures as an often "musically dazzling" album, while noting that "the one criticism that can be still levelled at Beck is that his songs remain strangely soulless, failing to ever really grip the emotions or stir the soul." In a mixed review, Stephen Thomas Erlewine of AllMusic states that while the album's initial songs are "tight, catchy, and memorable, the production dense", the "awkward, misguided shift in tone" of "Hollywood Freaks" gives the rest of the album the impression that "for all the ingenuity, it's just a hipster joke." Robert Christgau of The Village Voice felt that "his problem isn't that he tries to be funny, but that his jokes are as forced as his horn charts", later giving it a one-star honorable mention rating and remarking that it "does eventually get funky, if anybody cares but me."

Midnite Vultures was nominated in 2001 for Album of the Year at the 43rd Grammy Awards.

In 2006, Midnite Vultures was named the 50th "Worst Album Ever" by Q. Conversely, in 2013, NME ranked the album at number 307 in its list of the 500 greatest albums of all time.

== Track listing ==
All tracks are written by Beck Hansen, except where noted.

Original compact disc release
| No. | Title | Writer(s) | Length |
|---|---|---|---|
| 1. | "Sexx Laws" | | 3:39 |
| 2. | "Nicotine & Gravy" | | 5:13 |
| 3. | "Mixed Bizness" | | 4:10 |
| 4. | "Get Real Paid" ( (Note: Digital releases include "Intro to Get Real Paid" as a distinct track)) | | 4:44 |
| 5. | "Hollywood Freaks" | Hansen, John King, Michael Simpson | 3:59 |
| 6. | "Peaches & Cream" | | 4:54 |
| 7. | "Broken Train" | | 4:11 |
| 8. | "Milk & Honey" | Hansen, Buzz Clifford | 5:18 |
| 9. | "Beautiful Way" | | 5:44 |
| 10. | "Pressure Zone" ( (Note: Digital releases include "Intro to Pressure Zone" as a distinct track)) | | 3:14 |
| 11. | "Debra" (includes hidden track (Note: "Debra" ends at 5:42, an untitled hidden track (sometimes credited as "Midnite Vultures Bonus Noise") starts at 12:42)) | Ed Green, Hansen, John King, Michael Simpson | 13:46 |
| Total length: | | | 58:52 |

Japanese release bonus track
| No. | Title | Length |
|---|---|---|
| 12. | "Arabian Nights" ( (Note: "Arabian Nights" includes hidden track on some pressings)) | 5:37 |

Best Buy limited edition bonus disc
| No. | Title | Length |
|---|---|---|
| 1. | "Salt in the Wound" | 3:24 |
| 2. | "This Is My Crew" | 3:55 |
| 3. | "Sexx Laws" (Malibu remix) | 6:52 |

== Personnel ==
- Beck – vocals; keyboards (tracks 1, 6, 7, 10), guitar (tracks 2, 6, 7, 9, 10), synthesizers (track 2, 4, 8), piano (track 2), vocoder (track 3, 8), choir vocals (track 4), bass synthesizer (track 5), backing vocals (tracks 6, 7, 10), handclaps (track 6), marimbas (track 7), harmonica (tracks 7, 9), acoustic guitar (track 8), bass guitar (track 9), programming (tracks 1–4, 6–8, 10), horn arrangements (tracks 1, 3, 6)
- Justin Meldal-Johnsen – bass guitar (tracks 1–8, 10), synthesizer (track 2), backing vocals & shaker (track 3), percussion (tracks 6, 7), handclaps (track 6), guitar (track 8), noise (10), upright bass (track 11)
- Roger Joseph Manning Jr. – synthesizers (tracks 1–8, 10), piano (tracks 1, 2, 8, 10), tambourine (tracks 1, 9, 10), shaker (tracks 1, 10), clavinet (tracks 2, 7, 8), vocoder (track 3, 8), backing vocals (track 3, 10), choir vocals (track 4), organ (track 6, 11), percussion (tracks 6, 7), handclaps (track 6), acoustic guitar (track 7), guitar & electronic drums (track 8), keyboards (track 9), Fender Rhodes electric piano (track 11)
- Smokey Hormel – guitar (tracks 1, 3, 8, 11)
- Joey Waronker – drums (tracks 3, 7, 8, 10, 11), percussion (track 10)
- David Arthur Brown – tenor sax (tracks 1, 2, 3, 6)
- Jon Birdsong – trumpet (tracks 1, 2, 3, 6)
- David Ralicke – trombone (tracks 1, 2, 3, 6)
- Tony Hoffer – programming (tracks 3, 4, 5, 8, 10), guitar (track 3, 8)
- David Campbell – viola, string arrangements & string conductor (track 2)
- Larry Corbett – cello (track 2)
- Joel Derouin – violin (track 2)
- Greg Leisz – pedal steel (track 9)
- Jay Dee Maness – pedal steel (tracks 1, 9)
- Johnny Marr – guitar (track 8)
- Herb Pedersen – banjo (tracks 1, 2)
- Fernando Pullum – horn (track 11)
- Joe Turano – horn (track 11), backing vocals (track 11)
- Arnold McCuller – backing vocals (tracks 1, 2, 4, 5)
- Beth Orton – backing vocals (track 9)
- The Dust Brothers – scratching & programming (track 5)
- Steve Baxter – horn (track 11), backing vocals (track 11)
- Valerie Pinkston – backing vocals (tracks 1, 2, 4, 5)
- Mickey Petralia – programming (tracks 1, 2, 4, 6, 7, 9)
- DJ Swamp – scratching (track 2)
- Eve Butler – violin (track 2)
- Arroyo Bombers – gang chorus (track 5)
- Arroyo Tabernacle Men's Chorale – choir (track 6)

Technical:

- Beck - production; mixing (tracks 1–6, 8)
- Mickey Petralia – production (tracks 1, 2, 4, 6, 7, 9), engineering (tracks 1, 2, 4, 7, 9), mixing (track 1, 2, 6–10)
- The Dust Brothers – production (tracks 5, 11), engineer (track 5)
- Michael Patterson – mixing (tracks 1–6, 8, 11)
- Tony Hoffer – co-production (tracks 3, 4, 8, 10), mixing (tracks 3, 4, 8, 10), sound design (4, 10), engineering (track 3, 4, 8, 10)
- Derek Carlson – second engineer
- Steve Mixdorf – second engineer
- Chris Bellman – mastering
- Brian Gardner – mastering
- Bernie Grundman – mastering
- Robert Carranza – string engineer (track 2)
- Eye – artwork, art direction, design, collage
- Charlie Gross – photography
- Shauna O'Brien – project manager
- Gimbop – layout direction
- Michel Gondry – collage
- SA

== Charts ==
=== Weekly charts ===
| Chart (1999) | Peak position |
|---|---|
| Australian Albums (ARIA) | 34 |
| Austrian Albums (Ö3 Austria) | 41 |
| Belgian Albums (Ultratop Flanders) | 32 |
| Canadian Albums (RPM) | 8 |
| Danish Albums (Hitlisten) | 26 |
| Dutch Albums (Album Top 100) | 88 |
| French Albums (SNEP) | 19 |
| German Albums (Offizielle Top 100) | 46 |
| New Zealand Albums (RMNZ) | 33 |
| Norwegian Albums (VG-lista) | 3 |
| Scottish Albums (Official Charts) | 22 |
| Swedish Albums (Sverigetopplistan) | 29 |
| Swiss Albums (Schweizer Hitparade) | 42 |
| UK Albums (Official Charts) | 19 |
| US Billboard 200 | 34 |

=== Year-end charts ===
| Chart (2000) | Position |
|---|---|
| US Billboard 200 | 183 |

== Certifications ==
| Region | Certification | Certified units/sales |
|---|---|---|
| Australia (ARIA) | Gold | 35,000^{‡} |
| Canada (Music Canada) | Platinum | 100,000^{^} |
| Japan (RIAJ) | Gold | 100,000^{^} |
| United Kingdom (BPI) | Gold | 100,000^{^} |
| United States (RIAA) | Gold | 743,000 |
^{^} Shipments figures based on certification alone.
