= You Think You Really Know Me =

Studio album by Gary Wilson
- Released: 1977, reissued 2002
- Recorded: Bearsville, Woodstock, New York; Gary Wilson's parents' basement, Endicott, New York
- Genres: Lo-fi; new wave
- Length: 34:04
- Label: Motel
- Producer: Gary Wilson

Gary Wilson chronology
| You Think You Really Know Me (1977) | Forgotten Lovers (2003) |

You Think You Really Know Me is the 1977 debut album by Gary Wilson. It was reissued by Motel Records in 2002.

== Background ==
Gary Wilson went to Albert Grossman's Bearsville Studios in Woodstock, New York, in 1976, a well-known recording studio that has played host to sessions by Bob Dylan, Patti Smith, The Rolling Stones and many other notable acts. There, Wilson recorded versions of "6.4 = Make Out", "Chromium Bitch", "Groovy Girls", and "I Want To Lose Control". He eventually decided that he would prefer to record at his familiar home studio and finished recording You Think You Really Know Me, his first album, in his parents' basement. On this recording, Wilson sometimes played solo and was other times accompanied by a backing band, The Blind Dates. He pressed, distributed, funded and released the album himself. Wilson pressed 300 copies in 1977 and a further 300 copies in 1979 (he now claims that he only has two original copies left in his personal possession from these pressings). In 1991, Cry Baby Records re-released the album, pressing about 1000 copies.

== Reception ==
Professional ratings
Review scores
| Source | Rating |
|---|---|
| AllMusic | 4/5 stars |
| Pitchfork | 7.7/10 |
| Stylus Magazine | C |

You Think You Really Know Me did not gain substantial attention upon its initial 1977 release. Though re-released again in 1979, to little fanfare, the album eventually gained a cult following. Beck namechecked Wilson in his 1996 song "Where It's At", one of his biggest hits. Feeding Tube Records described the album as "the sound of a 23 year old oddball from upstate New York, wrestling with his demons and actually winning. There’s nothing quite like it. And it offers a story of hope to every weirdo who hears it." A retrospective critical appraisal describes the album's music as "s strange combination of funk, rock, and music that sounds something like a 70s TV show theme."

== Track listing ==
1. "Another Time I Could Have Loved You" - 1:14
2. "You Keep on Looking" - 2:05
3. "6.4 = Make Out" - 5:01
4. "When You Walk Into My Dreams" - 2:39
5. "Loneliness" - 3:04
6. "Cindy" - 2:50
7. "You Were Too Good to Be True" - 1:59
8. "Groovy Girls Make Love at the Beach" - 4:09
9. "I Wanna Lose Control" - 2:22
10. "You Think You Really Know Me" - 2:06
11. "Chromium Bitch" - 3:26
12. "And Then I Kissed Your Lips" - 2:51

== Personnel ==
Credits adapted from You Think You Really Know Me liner notes.

Musicians

- Gary Wilson – vocals, guitar, bass, synthesizer, electric piano, organ, drums
- Gary Iacovelli – drums (3, 4, 7, 8, 11)
- Vince Rossi – trombone (5)
- Greg McQuade – synthesizer (9)
- Dave Haney – backing vocals (9)
- Tom Ciotoli – backing vocals (9)

Production

- Gary Wilson – production
- Joe Yankee – mastering
- Adrian Milan – artwork
- Christina Bates – artwork
