= Órale =

Mexican Spanish slang interjection

Órale is a common interjection in Mexican Spanish slang. It is also commonly used in the United States as an exclamation expressing approval or encouragement. The term has varying connotations, including an affirmation that something is impressive, an agreement with a statement (akin to "okay"), or to signify distress. The word's origin is from the adverb "ahora", shortened to "ora", with the added suffix “-le”, e.g. “ándale” and “épale”. In Denmark, órale is also used as a multiethnic slang, particularly among youth from immigrant backgrounds.

== In media and pop culture ==
- As a greeting, the word is used by Cheech Marin in his 1987 film Born in East L.A. in the phrase "Órale vato, ¡wassápenin!", meaning "All right, man! What's happening?", a popular phrase used by Mexican Americans who have taken the gitano word vato from northern Mexico slang to mean "man".
- Used as a slang term by Edward James Olmos in the 1988 American drama film, Stand and Deliver.
- The phrase was popularized in professional wrestling (as a de facto catch-phrase) by Konnan and later Eddie Guerrero.
- Óoorale! is the name of a popular Mexican gossip magazine, known for its pornographic content and forged photographs.
- Beck's 1996 album Odelay uses a phonetic English rendering of "órale" as its title.
- Stand-up comedian Gabriel Iglesias uses the term frequently, referring to his Mexican heritage.
- The term is used often in the 1992 film American Me.
- The term is used in the 1993 film Blood In Blood Out.
- The term is used frequently in the Broadway musical Zoot Suit, and its 1981 film adaptation.
- The term is used in the 1998 video game Grim Fandango.
- The term is used in the 2013 video game Guacamelee!
- Órale is the name of the Grammy-nominated 7th album by Mariachi Divas de Cindy Shea.
- In George Lopez's eponymous ABC sitcom which originally aired from 2002 to 2007, his titular character shouts "Órale!" in many situations.
- In the FX original series Sons of Anarchy, "órale" is frequently said by the Byz Lats during conversation.
- In the AMC original series Breaking Bad, "órale" is frequently said by Tuco Salamanca.
- In the FX series Snowfall, the term “órale” is used repeatedly by Mexican drug trafficker Gustavo Zapata.
- In the Netflix series Queen of the South, the term “órale” is frequently used by Pote Galvez, a Mexican cartel soldier and trusted friend of Teresa Mendoza.
- In the 2022 video game Modern Warfare II, Alejandro Vargas, the leader of a group with the Fuerzas Especiales (Mexican Special Forces) uses the term "órale" often when talking to and commanding his team.
- Title of a song by El Vez, the Mexican Elvis.
- Title of a song by the Danish rapper Gilli.
- Title of a song by the Danish rap duo DC, featuring the Danish-Somali rapper Jamaika.
- Used by the character Bob the Mexican in The Hateful Eight.
- Muerta, a character in Dota 2 (video game) uses "Orale" when issuing a move command
