= E-Pro =

Single by Beck

from the album Guero
- B-side: "Venom Confection"; "Ghost Range"; "Bad Cartridge"
- Released: March 14, 2005
- Recorded: 2004
- Genre: Rap rock
- Length: 3:25
- Label: Interscope
- Songwriters: Beck Hansen; Mike Simpson; John King; Mike Diamond; Adam Yauch; Adam Horovitz
- Producers: Beck; Dust Brothers

Beck singles chronology
| "Guess I'm Doing Fine" (2002) | "E-Pro" (2005) | "Girl" (2005) |

Music video
- "E-Pro" on YouTube

"E-Pro" is a song by Beck, and serves as the first track on his 2005 album Guero. It was released as the lead single from the album in March 2005. The song was Beck's second number 1 on the Modern Rock chart and his first in eleven years. It peaked at number 65 on the Billboard Hot 100. Beck used the rhythm track of the Beastie Boys' "So What'cha Want" as a sample in "E-Pro".

== Music video ==
The music video for the song was created by Shynola. It is set in a computer-animated wireframe environment, where Beck rises from a grave and digs up a dog, only to be pursued by skeletal zombies. He escapes on what appears to be a bike, the wheels of which turn into legs and climb buildings. Near the middle of the video, his head is knocked off and is washed in a washing machine and fished out of a river, only to be shot back onto his neck via cannon. Near the end Beck is seen running from a giant skull made up of the graveyard gate and headstones. He begins jumping up a series of musical notes, finally teetering on the last one as the song abruptly cuts off and the video fades to black. Subsequently, the video was nominated for "Best Music Video" in the 2005 Arias Awards.

Beck suffered a spinal injury during the shooting of the video while harnessed inside a moving wheel. His injuries forced him to limit his touring for a number of years before making a recovery.

== Track listing ==
=== CD ===
1. "E-Pro" – 3:25
2. "Venom Confection" ("E-Pro" remix by Green, Music & Gold) – 3:05
3. "Ghost Range" ("E-Pro" remix by Homelife) – 4:26
4. "E-Pro" video

=== 7" ===
1. "E-Pro"
2. "Bad Cartridge" ("E-Pro" remix by Paza)

== Charts ==
=== Weekly charts ===
Weekly chart performance for "E-Pro"
| Chart (2005) | Peak position |
|---|---|
| Canada Rock Top 30 (Radio & Records) | 12 |
| Italy (FIMI) | 46 |
| Scottish Singles Sales (Official Charts) | 38 |
| UK Singles (Official Charts) | 38 |
| US Billboard Hot 100 | 65 |
| US Adult Alternative Airplay (Billboard) | 5 |
| US Alternative Airplay (Billboard) | 1 |
| US Mainstream Rock Airplay (Billboard) | 31 |
| US Pop 100 (Billboard) | 56 |

=== Year-end charts ===
Year-end chart performance for "E-Pro"
| Chart (2005) | Position |
|---|---|
| US Modern Rock Tracks (Billboard) | 11 |
