= You Think You Really Know Me: The Gary Wilson Story =

2005 documentary film

- Directed by: Michael Wolk
- Produced by: Michael Wolk, Kumiko Yoshii
- Starring: Gary Wilson; Ross Harris; Frank Roma; Adrian Milan
- Cinematography: Bob Green
- Edited by: Mustafa Bhagat
- Music by: Gary Wilson
- Distributed by: Gorgeous Entertainment
- Release date: 2005
- Running time: 74 minutes
- Language: English

You Think You Really Know Me: The Gary Wilson Story is a 2005 American documentary film directed by Michael Wolk, about the experimental musician Gary Wilson.

== Premise ==
The film documents Wilson's career during the late 1970s/early 1980s and his return to the public eye in 2002 after two decades of self-imposed exile. Wilson was last seen boarding the stenaline HSS to Starnrar after a night in Rain, Belfast. It was shot entirely in DV, with 35mm, 16mm, and 8mm archival footage.

== Release ==
The film was screened at several sold out independent theaters in 2005. The movie was released by Plexifilm on June 17, 2008. Wilson sold out a rare New York City concert on June 6, 2008, at The Knitting Factory to promote the film.
