= Where It's At (Beck song) =

1996 single by Beck

Single by Beck

from the album Odelay
- B-side: "Make Out City"; "Bonus Beats"
- Written: 1995
- Released: May 28, 1996
- Genre: Alternative hip hop; funk
- Length: 3:42 (radio edit); 5:30 (album version)
- Label: DGC; Bong Load
- Songwriters: Beck; John King; Michael Simpson
- Producers: Beck; The Dust Brothers

Beck singles chronology
"It's All in Your Mind" (1995)	"Where It's At" (1996)	"Devils Haircut" (1996)

Music video
- "Where It's At" on YouTube

"Where It's At" is a song by American alternative rock musician Beck, released in May 1996 by DGC and Bong Load as the first single from his fifth album, Odelay (1996). Beck wrote the song in 1995 with its co-producers John King and Michael Simpson (known as the Dust Brothers), and premiered it at Lollapalooza the same year, in a version very similar to its incarnation on Odelay. He has performed the song often since 1995, frequently experimenting with the music and lyrics. Its music video was directed by Steve Hanft.

== Production ==
"Where It's At" has a number of spoken samples that Beck and the Dust Brothers incorporated into it. Many of these come from an obscure sex education album titled Sex for Teens: (Where It's At), a subtitle Beck borrowed. Other vocal samples incorporated into "Where It's At" come from "Needle to the Groove" by old-school hip hop group Mantronix ("we've got two turntables and a microphone ..."), as well as the Frogs ("that was a good drum break"). The song also references Gary Wilson, one of Beck's influences. In addition, just before the Frogs sample begins, the song incorporates a musical sample from the intro of noted go-go band E.U.'s song "Knock Him Out Sugar Ray".

Beck earned the Grammy Award for Best Male Rock Vocal Performance for the song. In October 2011, NME placed it at number 76 on its list of 150 Best Tracks of the Past 15 Years.

== Critical reception ==
Justin Chadwick from Albumism said "Where It's At" is "the most memorable" song among the singles of the Odelay album. He added, "Propelled by a cacophony of distorted melodies, oddball vocal snippets, and the unforgettable chorus chant of 'Where it's at! I've got two turntables and a microphone'', with a robotic echo lifted from Mantronix's 1985 single 'Needle to the Groove', Beck gives you little choice but to wholeheartedly accept his invitation to the 'destination a little up the road'." Paul Verna from Billboard noted that "he takes a more straightforward tack, floating stream-of-consciousness raps over sampled beats." Daina Darzin from Cash Box named it Pick of the Week, noting that fans of "Loser" "should be equally happy with this". She wrote, "Jazzy, loopy keyboards, hip hop rhythms, psychedelic swirls of sixties-ish sound, and a happy, party-hearty groove make this a possible add for urban as well as modern rock stations."

In 2012, Paste ranked the song number two on their list of the 20 greatest Beck songs, and in 2020, The Guardian ranked the song number seven on their list of the 30 greatest Beck songs.

== Music video ==
The accompanying music video for "Where It's At" was directed by Steve Hanft. It features Beck doing a variety of things, such as cleaning up a highway for community service as a convict, singing at a car dealership, dressed as the Candyman, and line dancing. In one moment, Beck pays homage to William Shatner's performance of "Rocket Man" at the 1977 Saturn Awards ceremony. "Where It's At" was the first music video to be broadcast on MTV2 on August 1, 1996. Beck also pays homage to Captain Beefheart by dressing as Captain Beefheart was dressed in the Trout Mask Replica album photo sessions at 1:27 in the video. The video was awarded a MTV Video Music Award for Best Male Video. The shorter version was used for this video instead of the album version.

== Track listings ==
- US 12-inch
1. "Where It's At" (edit)
2. "Make Out City"
3. "Where It's At" (remix by Mario C and Mickey P)
4. "Where It's At" (remix by John King)
5. "Bonus Beats"
- UK CD1
1. "Where It's At" (edit)
2. "Where It's At" (remix by Mario C and Mickey P)
3. "Bonus Beats"
4. "Where It's At" (remix by U.N.K.L.E.)
- UK CD2 and Australian CD
1. "Where It's At" (edit)
2. "Where It's At" (remix by Mario C and Mickey P)
3. "Bonus Beats"
- Japan
1. "Where It's At" (edit)
2. "Where It's At" (remix by John King)
3. "Lloyd Price Express" (remix by John King)
4. "Dark and Lovely" (remix by the Dust Brothers)
5. "American Wasteland"
6. "Clock"

== Personnel ==
- Beck Hansen – vocals, electric piano, guitar, bass, organ, drum samples
- The Dust Brothers – turntables
- Mike Boito – trumpet, organ
- Money Mark – organ
- David Brown – saxophone
- Eddie Lopez – outro talking

== Charts ==
=== Weekly charts ===
Chart (1996)	Peak position
Australia (ARIA)	71
Canada Top Singles (RPM)	50
Canada Rock/Alternative (RPM)	3
Europe (Eurochart Hot 100)	97
Iceland (Íslenski Listinn Topp 40)	4
New Zealand (Recorded Music NZ)	34
Scottish Singles Sales (Official Charts)	32
Sweden (Sverigetopplistan)	49
UK Singles (Official Charts)	35
US Billboard Hot 100	61
US Modern Rock Tracks (Billboard)	5
US Cash Box Top 100	54

=== Year-end charts ===
Chart (1996)	Position
Canada Rock/Alternative (RPM)	42
Iceland (Íslenski Listinn Topp 40)	22
US Modern Rock Tracks (Billboard)	20

== Release history ==
Region	Date	Format(s)	Label(s)	Ref.
United States	May 28, 1996	Modern rock; college radio	DGC; Bong Load	
United Kingdom	June 17, 1996	12-inch vinyl; CD; cassette	Geffen; Bong Load	
United States	August 6, 1996	Contemporary hit radio	DGC; Bong Load	
Japan	October 23, 1996	CD	Geffen; Bong Load	
