= Lisa Wants to Talk to You =

Studio album by Gary Wilson
- Released: September 15, 2008
- Recorded: Wilson's home studio in San Diego
- Label: Human Ear Music / Feeding Tube Records
- Producer: Gary Wilson

Gary Wilson chronology
Forgotten Lovers (2006)	Lisa Wants to Talk to You (2008)	Alone With Gary Wilson (2013)

Professional ratings
Review scores
Source	Rating
Spin	3/5 stars

Lisa Wants to Talk to You is the title of the fourth album by experimental musician Gary Wilson, released on September 15, 2008 by the Echo Park-based label Human Ear Music. The album has been re issued on vinyl by Feeding Tube Records in 2012. The album was reissued as "Come On, Mary" on Cleopatra Records in 2025.

Human Ear Music describes the new album as "more mellow and direct than previous efforts," and features "backing vocals and cameo monologues by longtime partner and video performance collaborator, Bernadette Allen (a.k.a. Mary, a.k.a. Linda, a.k.a. Lisa, etc)." The record's cover artwork was designed by Ariel Pink and Jason Grier.

== Track listing ==
1. "All Alone in Endicott"
2. "Lisa Wants to Talk to You"
3. "Dance with Linda Tonight"
4. "Come On Mary"
5. "Feel The Breeze"
6. "I Woke Up Into a Thousand Dreams" (Instrumental)
7. "Mary Won’t You Dance for Me"
8. "Karen Had a Secret"
9. "Run Through The Woods"
10. "Your Dream is Not My Scene"
11. "As I Walk into The Night" (Instrumental)
12. "Sandy"
13. "You Are Still My Girlfriend"
14. "All Alone in Endicott II"
