= Sexx Laws =

Single by Beck

from the album Midnite Vultures
- B-side: "This Is My Crew" / "Salt in the Wound"
- Released: October 1999
- Recorded: 1999
- Length: 3:38
- Label: Geffen
- Songwriter: Beck Hansen
- Producers: Beck Hansen; Mickey Petralia

Beck singles chronology
"Nobody's Fault but My Own" (1999)	"Sexx Laws" (1999)	"Mixed Bizness" (2000)

Music video
- "Sexx Laws" on YouTube

"Sexx Laws" is a song by American singer Beck, from his album Midnite Vultures (1999). It was released as the lead single from the album in October 1999.

== Composition ==
Beck said of the song's lyrics:

It's me playing with the ridiculousness of those entrenched ideas about what a man does and what a woman can do. A lot of soul music comes from a real masculine strength, but there's also this intense vulnerability about it. You have the masculine tough-guy exterior and the emotional openness, which is feminine, as well. I wanted to have fun with that, turn up that contrast a little bit without getting bogged down into preciousness and psychobabble.

Of the song's music, he said:

I think my main interest in using the horns was for performance - so much music today is so guitar heavy. I sought other places to get muscle into the music. Many bands rely heavily on guitar to pump up the sound, but I thought it would be interesting to make the horns into the guitars. I think it was the L.A. Rams. I used to watch them when I was growing up, and it just reminded me of Monday Night Football in 1978.

== Reception ==
In 2014, NME named it the 260th Greatest Song of All Time. Paste and The Guardian both ranked the song number 10 on their lists of the greatest Beck songs.

== In popular culture ==
"Sexx Laws" was used in the 2014 Renault Twingo advertisement. The song was also used in the Futurama episode "Bendin' in the Wind", the series finale of Strangers With Candy, and in Daria.

== Live performances ==
Beck has performed the song close to 300 times. Although it was released on Midnite Vultures in 1999, he performed the song live for the first time as early as June 1998.

== Music videos ==
The music video, directed by Beck himself, contains visual references to films such as Mr. Freedom, Anna, as well as the feature film adaptation of Ganbare!! Robocon. Jack Black appears in the music video as a member of the Vision Warrior Men's Circle, along with Neil Strauss and Justin Meldal-Johnsen. Surreal elements of the video include a refrigerator dry humping an oven, Kenny G (played by Meldal-Johnsen) in a room of football players, and a spinning mannequin of a zebra with a banjo.

There are several versions of the video. The original (once posted on Beck's website) was over 18 minutes long and extended the intro of the Men's Circle. The subsequent versions edited out the intro and ending, the latter truncating a pep rally speech by Jack Black's character.

== Track listings ==
CD1

1. "Sexx Laws" – 3:38
2. "Salt in the Wound" – 3:24
3. "Sexx Laws" (Wizeguyz Remix) – 6:03

CD2

1. "Sexx Laws" – 3:38
2. "This Is My Crew" – 3:55
3. "Sexx Laws" (Malibu Remix) – 6:51

7"

1. "Sexx Laws" – 3:38
2. "Salt in the Wound" – 3:24

12"

1. "Sexx Laws" – 3:38
2. "Sexx Laws" (Malibu Remix) – 6:51
3. "Salt in the Wound" – 3:24
4. "Sexx Laws" (Wizeguyz Remix) – 6:03

== Personnel ==
- Beck - lead vocals, keyboard, horn arrangement
- Justin Meldal-Johnsen - bass
- Roger Joseph Manning Jr. - synthesizer, piano, tambourine, shaker
- Smokey Hormel - guitar
- David Arthur Brown - tenor sax
- Jon Birdsong - trumpet
- David Ralicke - trombone
- Jay Dee Maness - pedal steel
- Herb Pedersen - banjo
- Arnold McCuller - backing vocals
- Valerie Pinkston - backing vocals

== Charts ==
Chart (1999)	Peak position
Australia (ARIA)	84
UK Singles (Official Charts)	27
US Modern Rock Tracks (Billboard)	21
