= Mixed Bizness =

Single by Beck

from the album Midnite Vultures
- B-side: "Mixed Bizness" remixes / "Dirty Dirty" / "Saxx Laws (Night Flight to Ojai)" / "Arabian Nights"
- Released: March 7, 2000
- Genre: Funk rock; R&B
- Length: 3:38
- Label: Geffen
- Songwriter: Beck Hansen
- Producers: Beck Hansen; Tony Hoffer

Beck singles chronology
"Sexx Laws" (1999)	"Mixed Bizness" (2000)	"Nicotine & Gravy" (2000)

Music video
- "Mixed Bizness" on YouTube

"Mixed Bizness" is a song by American musician Beck. It was released as the second single from his 1999 album Midnite Vultures. Released in 2000, the CD single included five non-album tracks/remixes. It peaked at number 34 on the UK Singles Chart.

== Live history ==
The song has been performed over 300 times by Beck. It has been performed fairly regularly since its release, with the exception of 2010 to 2014, when Beck only played it once in 2011.

Beck performed the song 54 times on his Colors tour.

== Track listings ==
=== United States ===
CD

1. "Mixed Bizness"
2. "Mixed Bizness" (Nu Wave Dreamix by Les Rythmes Digitales)
3. "Mixed Bizness" (Cornelius remix)
4. "Mixed Bizness" (DJ Me DJ You remix)
5. "Dirty Dirty"
6. "Saxx Laws (Night Flight to Ojai)"

12"

1. "Mixed Bizness"
2. "Mixed Bizness" (Nu Wave Dreamix by Les Rythmes Digitales)
3. "Mixed Bizness" (Dirty Bixin Mixness Remix by Bix Pender)
4. "Mixed Bizness" (Cornelius remix)
5. "Dirty Dirty"

=== United Kingdom ===
CD1

1. "Mixed Bizness" – 3:48
2. "Mixed Bizness" (Cornelius Remix) – 4:48
3. "Mixed Bizness" (DJ Me DJ You remix) – 3:58
4. "Mixed Bizness" (CD-ROM video, directed by Stéphane Sednaoui)

CD2

1. "Mixed Bizness" (Nu Wave Dreamix by Les Rythmes Digitales) – 4:22
2. "Dirty Dirty" – 4:41
3. "Sexx Laws" (CD-ROM video)

7"

1. "Mixed Bizness"
2. "Mixed Bizness" (Dirty Bixin Mixness Remix by Bix Pender)

CD maxi-single

1. "Mixed Bizness"
2. "Mixed Bizness" (Nu Wave Dreamix by Les Rythmes Digitales)
3. "Mixed Bizness" (Dirty Bixin Mixness Remix by Bix Pender)
4. "Arabian Nights"

=== EU ===
CD single

1. "Mixed Bizness"
2. "Arabian Nights"

=== Japan ===
CD

1. "Mixed Bizness"
2. "Mixed Bizness" (Cornelius Remix)
3. "Mixed Bizness" (Nu Wave Dreamix by Les Rythmes Digitales)
4. "Mixed Bizness" (DJ Me DJ You remix)
5. "Mixed Bizness" (Dirty Bixin Mixness Remix by Bix Pender)
6. "Dirty Dirty"
7. "Saxx Laws" (Night Flight to Ojai)

== Personnel ==
- Beck – lead vocals, vocoder, horn arrangement
- Justin Meldal-Johnsen – bass, backing vocals, shaker
- Roger Joseph Manning Jr. – synthesizer, vocoder, backing vocals
- Smokey Hormel – guitar
- Joey Waronker – drums
- David Arthur Brown – tenor sax
- Jon Birdsong – trumpet
- David Ralicke – trombone
- Tony Hoffer – guitar

== Chart positions ==
Chart (2000)	Peak position
UK Singles Chart	34
US Modern Rock Tracks (Billboard)	36
