= Nicotine & Gravy =

Single by Beck

from the album Midnite Vultures
- B-side: "Midnite Vultures" / "Zatyricon"
- Released: July 2000
- Length: 5:15
- Label: Geffen
- Songwriter: Bek Hansen
- Producers: Bek Hansen; Mickey Petralia

Beck singles chronology
"Mixed Bizness" (2000)	"Nicotine & Gravy" (2000)	"Lost Cause" (2002)

Music video
- "Nicotine & Gravy" on YouTube

"Nicotine & Gravy" is a song by Beck, from the 1999 album Midnite Vultures. It was released as a single in Europe in July 2000.

The song was performed regularly by Beck from 2000 to 2008, during one show in 2014, and again frequently from 2018.

Beck has said that the song "was actually three or four songs put together. I had a bunch of things written when Mickey and Tony came on board as engineers. We worked on the stuff as a group, a squad, all hands on deck. They heard things that worked together, and so we tried them. The beauty of working that way on computer is, when you don't like it, you just hit 'undo.'"

== Track listing ==
1. "Nicotine & Gravy" – 5:15
2. "Midnite Vultures" – 7:18
3. "Zatyricon" – 5:16
4. "Nicotine & Gravy" (video)
