= Odelay =

Studio album by Beck
- Released: June 18, 1996
- Recorded: 1994–95
- Studios: PCP Labs (Los Angeles); G-Son (Los Angeles); The Shop (Arcata); Sunset Sound (Los Angeles); Conway (Hollywood)
- Genres: Alternative rock; sampledelia; alternative hip hop; experimental rock; folk rock; neo-psychedelia
- Length: 54:06
- Labels: DGC; Bong Load
- Producers: Beck Hansen; The Dust Brothers; Mario Caldato, Jr; Brian Paulson; Tom Rothrock; Rob Schnapf

Beck chronology
One Foot in the Grave (1994)	Odelay (1996)	Mutations (1998)

Singles from Odelay
- 1. "Where It's At" Released: May 28, 1996; 2. "Devils Haircut" Released: December 11, 1996; 3. "The New Pollution" Released: February 28, 1997; 4. "Sissyneck" Released: June 17, 1997; 5. "Jack-Ass" Released: August 26, 1997

Alternative cover
- Deluxe Edition artwork

Odelay is the fifth studio album by American musician Beck, released on June 18, 1996, by DGC Records. The album featured several successful singles, including "Where It's At", "Devils Haircut", and "The New Pollution", and peaked at number sixteen on the Billboard 200. As of July 2008, the album had sold 2.3 million copies in the United States, making Odelay Beck's most successful album to date. Since its release, the album has been lauded by critics and has appeared in numerous publications' lists of the greatest of the 1990s and of all time.

== Recording ==
Beck approached Odelay with trepidation. "I thought Odelay might be the last time I got a chance to make a record,” he told Rolling Stone in 2008.

The sessions for what would become Odelay originally began as a subdued, acoustic affair. In 1994, Beck started to record tracks for his follow-up to Mellow Gold with Bong Load producers Tom Rothrock and Rob Schnapf. Together, they recorded the melancholy album-closer "Ramshackle". He would eventually abandon work with Rothrock and Schnapf, opting to work with the Dust Brothers instead. Most of the album was recorded in 1995 at the Dust Brothers' home recording studio in Silver Lake, Los Angeles. The Dust Brothers' production style was hip-hop-focused but layered; their résumé included work with Beastie Boys, Tone Lōc and Young MC. Their small recording room was filled with records, many of which provided samples for the album.

== Release and packaging ==
It was released on June 18, 1996, by DGC Records and its deluxe version was released on January 29, 2008, contain additional 19 B-sides, remixes and previously unreleased songs. The liner notes for the deluxe version feature complete lyrics and artwork, as well as an essay from Thurston Moore and the transcript of 15 high school students interviewed by Dave Eggers.

The album title is a phonetic English rendering of the Mexican slang greeting "órale", meaning "What's up?". According to Stephen Malkmus, the title is a pun on Oh Delay, because the album took very long to record. It is not a song title, but it is found in the lyrics of Lord Only Knows.

The album's cover is a photo of a Komondor, a rare Hungarian breed of dog with a heavy, corded coat, jumping over a hurdle. The original photo was shot by canine photographer Joan Ludwig (1914–2004) for the July 1977 issue of the American Kennel Club's gazette.

== Tour ==
The promotional tour for the album began in May–June 1996, appearing in several record stores and radio stations in the United States. Throughout the rest of the year followed numerous U.S. tours and European festival dates.

As the tour continued into 1997, Beck began playing larger venues in America. The tour unofficially ended on September 5, 1997, with a taped band performance at "Sessions at West 54th" in New York, after over 150 shows from July '96 until September '97.

It was on the Odelay tour that Beck earned a wide reputation as an energetic and impeccable performer, and his profile rose after multiple appearances on MTV, The Howard Stern Show, the 1997 Grammys, and Later... with Jools Holland.

== Critical reception ==
Professional ratings
Review scores
Source	Rating
AllMusic	5/5 stars
Chicago Tribune	4/4 stars
Entertainment Weekly	A−
The Guardian	4/5 stars
Los Angeles Times	4/4 stars
NME	8/10
Pitchfork	9.8/10
Rolling Stone	4/5 stars
Spin	10/10
The Village Voice	A−

Upon release, Odelay received almost unanimous critical acclaim. At the 39th Annual Grammy Awards in 1997, it was nominated for the Grammy Award for Album of the Year and won for Best Alternative Music Album, as well as Best Male Rock Vocal Performance for "Where It's At". Odelay was named the best album of the year in Rolling Stone, The Village Voice's Pazz & Jop critics' poll, and NME's annual critics poll.

In a retrospective review for AllMusic, Stephen Thomas Erlewine observed that, like Mellow Gold, Odelay incorporated elements from various genres, including "folk and country, grungy garage rock, stiff-boned electro, louche exotica, old-school rap and noise rock." Rolling Stone's Rob Sheffield noted punk rock, bossa nova, Latin soul and mainstream R&B as additional influences.

== Legacy ==
In 1998, Q magazine readers voted Odelay the 51st greatest album of all time. It was voted as one of the top 10 pop albums of the 1990s by the music writers of The Associated Press. It was ranked No. 16 in Spin's "100 Greatest Albums, 1985–2005". The music website Pitchfork ranked it at No. 19 on their top 100 albums of the 1990s in 2003 and No. 93 in their updated Top 150 list in 2022. In 2003, Slant Magazine included the album on its list of 50 Essential Pop Albums. Rolling Stone ranked the album No. 306 in their list of the 500 greatest albums of all time in 2009, and later ranked it No. 424 in the 2023 edition, as well as No. 9 on its 2019 list of the 100 best albums of the '90s. Voters in Channel 4's 2005 "100 Greatest Albums" poll placed it at No. 73.

In 2000, Odelay was ranked No. 54 in Colin Larkin's All Time Top 1000 Albums. It was also included in the book 1001 Albums You Must Hear Before You Die in 2010. In 2026, Odelay was ranked No. 5 on Consequence's list of the top 60 albums of 1996.

== Track listing ==
All tracks are written by Beck Hansen, John King and Michael Simpson, except where noted.

No.	Title	Writer(s)	Length
1.	"Devils Haircut"		3:14
2.	"Hotwax"		3:49
3.	"Lord Only Knows"	Hansen	4:14
4.	"The New Pollution"		3:39
5.	"Derelict"		4:12
6.	"Novacane"		4:37
7.	"Jack-Ass"		4:11
8.	"Where It's At"		5:30
9.	"Minus"	Hansen	2:32
10.	"Sissyneck"		3:52
11.	"Readymade"		2:37
12.	"High 5 (Rock the Catskills)"		4:10
13.	"Ramshackle"	Hansen	7:29
Total length:			54:06

- Track 13 includes a minute-long hidden track of noise.

Odelay Deluxe Edition track listing:

1. Devils Haircut (3:14)
2. Hotwax (3:49)
3. Lord Only Knows (4:14)
4. The New Pollution (3:39)
5. Derelict (4:12)
6. Novacane (4:37)
7. Jack-Ass (4:11)
8. Where It's At (5:30)
9. Minus (2:32)
10. Sissyneck (3:52)
11. Readymade (2:37)
12. High 5 (Rock the Catskills) (4:10)
13. Ramshackle (4:48)
14. Computer Rock (0:43)
15. Deadweight (6:12)
16. Inferno (7:01)
17. Gold Chains (4:59)
18. Where It's At (U.N.K.L.E. Remix) (12:26)
19. Richard's Hairpiece (Aphex Twin Remix)
20. American Wasteland (2:43)
21. Clock (3:17)
22. Thunderpeel (2:40)
23. Electric Music And The Summer People (4:38)
24. Lemonade (2:19)
25. SA-5 (1:52)
26. Feather In Your Cap (3:45)
27. Erase The Sun (Higher Speed & Tempo Version) (2:56)
28. 000.000 (5:24)
29. Brother (4:46)
30. Devil Got My Woman (4:34)
31. Trouble All My Days (2:23)
32. Strange Invitation (4:06)
33. Burro (Mariachi Version) (3:13)

Total length: 2:14:24

== Personnel ==
Credits adapted from 2008 "Deluxe Edition" CD liner notes.

- Beck Hansen – vocals; guitar (tracks 1–2, 4, 6, 8–12), Bass guitar (tracks 1–4, 6–12), harmonica (tracks 1–2, 6–7), organ (tracks 1, 4–6, 8, 10), slide guitar (tracks 2–3), clavinet (tracks 2, 4), Moog synthesizer (tracks 2, 5–6, 9, 12), electric guitar (tracks 3, 7), acoustic guitar (tracks 3, 7, 13), thumb piano, drums, rhumba box, tambourine & shakers (track 5), electric piano (tracks 6–8), xylophone (track 7), turntables (track 9), conga (track 10), echoplex & percussion (track 12)

Additional musicians

- Dust Brothers – turntables (tracks 1–2, 6, 8, 12), drum machine (tracks 6, 12)
- Ross Harris – wizard & child (track 2)
- Joey Waronker – drums (tracks 3, 6, 9, 13), percussion (tracks 3, 9, 12–13), chimes (track 9)
- Mike Millius – screams (track 3)
- Paolo Diaz – tablas (track 5)
- Mike Boito – clavinet (track 6), trumpet (track 8), organ (tracks 8, 10, 12)
- David Brown – saxophone (track 8)
- Money Mark – organ (track 8)
- Eddie Lopez – outro talking (track 8)
- Greg Leisz – pedal steel (track 10)
- Charlie Haden – upright bass (track 13)

Technical

- Beck – producer, mixing (tracks 1–12); art direction, design
- Dust Brothers – producers, mixing (tracks 1–8, 10–12)
- Mario Caldato, Jr. – producer, mixing (track 9)
- Brian Paulson – producer, mixing (track 9)
- Tom Rothrock – producer, mixing (track 13)
- Rob Schnapf – producer, mixing (track 13)
- Bob Ludwig – mastering
- Shauna O'Brien – project coordinator
- Robert Fisher – art direction, design
- Ludwig – cover photo
- Nitin Vadukul – Beck photos
- Charlie Gross – Beck photos, collage images
- Alison Dyer – Beck photos
- Manuel Ocampo – inlay paintings, collage images
- Al Hansen – collage images
- Zarim Osborn – collage images

== Charts ==
=== Weekly charts ===
Chart (1996)	Peak position
Australian Albums (ARIA)	20
Austrian Albums (Ö3 Austria)	30
Belgian Albums (Ultratop Flanders)	27
Belgian Albums (Ultratop Wallonia)	27
Dutch Albums (Album Top 100)	27
Finnish Albums (Suomen virallinen lista)	36
French Albums (SNEP)	39
German Albums (Offizielle Top 100)	30
New Zealand Albums (RMNZ)	16
Norwegian Albums (VG-lista)	23
Swedish Albums (Sverigetopplistan)	5
Swiss Albums (Schweizer Hitparade)	14
UK Albums (Official Charts)	17
US Billboard 200	16

=== Year-end charts ===
Chart (1996)	Position
US Billboard 200	101
Chart (1997)	Position
Canadian Albums (Nielsen Soundscan)	72
US Billboard 200	63

== Certifications ==
Region	Certification	Certified units/sales
Australia (ARIA)	Gold	35,000^{^}
Canada (Music Canada)	2× Platinum	200,000^{^}
Japan (RIAJ)	Platinum	200,000^{^}
New Zealand (RMNZ)	Platinum	15,000^{^}
United Kingdom (BPI)	Platinum	300,000^{^}
United States (RIAA)	2× Platinum	2,300,000
^{^} Shipments figures based on certification alone.
