= Michael Simpson (producer) =

American record producer

- Also known as: E.Z. Mike
- Born: Michael Simpson

Michael Simpson, also known as "E.Z. Mike", is an American record producer. Along with John King, he makes up one-half of the Los Angeles-based producing duo the Dust Brothers, who co-wrote and produced many critically acclaimed records including the Beastie Boys' Paul's Boutique and Beck's Odelay. He won a Grammy Award for his song writing and production on Santana's Supernatural album in 1999. He has also done producing on his own; most notable is his work with the Eels.

Simpson went on to compose the scores for the films Road Trip, Saving Silverman, Freddy Got Fingered and Stick It, where in addition to composing the original score, he teamed up with rapper Talib Kweli to produce and perform the song "Abra Cadabra". He has also contributed original music and songs to such films as Zoolander, The SpongeBob SquarePants Movie and Shrek Forever After.

Simpson was the musical director and frequent guest of Tom Green Live, Tom Green's live Internet show. In addition, E.Z. Mike and Tom Green created the Keepin' It Real Crew who recorded the album Prepare for Impact released by Sony Records in 2006.

More recent projects include the score to the film The Power of Few (2013) and music (including opening theme) for Comedy Central's TV series Tosh.0 (2011–2014).
