= Dust Brothers =

American record producers

- Origin: Los Angeles, California, US
- Genres: Instrumental hip-hop; hip-hop; electronic; rock; sampledelia
- Years active: 1985–2007
- Members: E.Z. Mike; King Gizmo
- Past members: Matt Dike

The Dust Brothers were a pair of songwriters and producers consisting of E.Z. Mike (Michael Simpson) and King Gizmo (John King). They were famous for the sample-based music they produced in the 1980s and 1990s, and specifically for their work on the albums Paul's Boutique by Beastie Boys, Odelay, Midnite Vultures and Guero by Beck, the soundtrack to Fight Club, and "MMMBop" by Hanson. They were based in Los Angeles, California.

== History ==
=== 1980s ===
Michael "E.Z." Simpson and John "Gizmo" King started working together as the Dust Brothers in 1985 at Pomona College radio station, KSPC, hosting a weekly hip-hop show called The Big Beat Showcase.

They developed writing and producing skills creating music for their show and DJing and rapping at parties. In 1987, they began writing and producing for the Delicious Vinyl label. There they wrote and produced tracks on Tone Lōc's album, Lōc-ed After Dark, Young MC's debut album Stone Cold Rhymin', and other Delicious Vinyl releases. They also worked with the Boo Yaa Tribe on the album New Funky Nation, producing several songs on that album.

Mike D of the Beastie Boys stopped by mutual friend Matt Dike's apartment, where Simpson and Dike played music intended to be a Dust Brothers album, and liked what he heard. The Dust Brothers along with Dike ended up co-writing, producing and mixing the Beastie Boys' second album, Paul's Boutique, considered one of the best albums of all time by Time in 2006.

=== 1990s ===
Beck had the Dust Brothers produce his album Odelay, released in 1996. The album spawned the hits "Where It's At" (No. 61 on the Hot 100), "Devils Haircut" (No. 94 on the Hot 100), "The New Pollution" (No. 78) and "Jack-Ass" (No. 73). In 1995 the Dust Brothers co-produced Mötley Crüe frontman Vince Neil's second solo album Carved in Stone.

In 1997, they produced a track with Korn called "Kick the P.A." for the Spawn soundtrack; produced the number one hit "MMMBop" for Hanson's first major label album Middle of Nowhere; and created a song on the number one soundtrack to the Howard Stern film Private Parts named "Tortured Man", featuring vocals by Stern. The Dust Brothers also co-produced three songs on the Rolling Stones album, Bridges to Babylon.

The next year, the duo were approached by director David Fincher to assemble the score for the film Fight Club, including "This Is Your Life", a song featuring lines from the film, including a monologue by the character Tyler Durden (Brad Pitt). The same year also saw the Dust Brothers collaborate with Jeymes Samuel aka the Bullitts on the soundtrack for the film Muppets from Space, recording a cover version of the Earth, Wind & Fire song "Shining Star".

In 1999, the two collaborated with Carlos Santana and Eagle-Eye Cherry on the track "Wishing It Was" which appeared on Santana's multi-platinum album Supernatural. For that album they won their first Grammy, after having received numerous nominations for their past work with Beck and with Hanson, and as artists for their instrumental song on the X-Files soundtrack. They also recorded, produced and mixed an album by 'hip pop' group 10 Cents named Buggin Out, and remixed the Styles of Beyond track "Winnetka Exit".

=== 2000s ===
The Dust Brothers continued work into the 2000s, collaborating with Tenacious D on their self-titled debut and Linkin Park on the track "With You" from their first studio album Hybrid Theory, and recording music for the soundtrack to Malcolm in the Middle. They reunited with Beck for the 2005 album Guero. Their last production together was in collaboration with They Might Be Giants, for their 2007 album The Else.

=== Unrealized album ===
In 1996, after the release of Odelay, reports of an original Dust Brothers album spread, with features in The Fly and Spin magazines discussing their plans. Two original tracks called "Searchin'" and "The Groomsman" appeared on editions of the Mo' Wax compilation series Headz.

In 1997, the duo announced an album titled Marshall High for release on their own label Nickelbag Records later that year, and shared preliminary album artwork on their website. This album was repeatedly delayed, and eventually shelved in favor of a Greatest Hits album, which also never saw release. In 2003, Money Mark's Pinto Recordings released a 2xLP compilation titled The Dusted Years (The Complete Dust Brothers), featuring a selection of remixes and productions from across the duo's career. It is unclear how involved Simpson and King were in selecting the tracklist.

King said in 2005: "We've been working on a Dust Brothers album since 1987, but songs continually get given to artists we work with. And now we're both so busy with things we're working on, and we both have families, that it's hard to get round to doing your own thing."

== Interactions with the Chemical Brothers ==
The Dust Brothers name and trademark was used by the British duo that eventually became the Chemical Brothers as they began their career. Used as an homage to the American group, they changed their name when they were unable to convince the Dust Brothers to sell the name. Their subsequent debut album, published as the Chemical Brothers, was then named Exit Planet Dust. Eventually the groups reached an understanding, and the duos swapped remixes: the Chemical Brothers' 1997 EP Elektrobank featured a Dust Brothers remix of the title track, while the Chemical Brothers remixed the Dust Brothers track "Realize" for the soundtrack of the 1998 film Dead Man on Campus.

== Production credits ==
Album	Song	Year	Artist
Lōc-ed After Dark	Cutting Rhythms; Next Episode; Don't Get Close	1989	Tone Loc
Paul's Boutique	entire album	1989	Beastie Boys
Escape from Havana	Hip Hop Creature	1989	Mellow Man Ace
Stone Cold Rhymin'	Know How; Got More Rhymes {co-produced by Michael Ross}	1989	Young MC
Just a Poet with Soul	Give It Here {co-produced by Def Jef}; Do It Baby; God Made Me Funky {co-produced by Def Jef}; Just a Poet {co-produced by Michael Ross}	1989	Def Jef
New Funky Nation	Rater R; Don't Mess; Once Upon a Drive By; Riot Pump	1990	Boo-Yaa T.R.I.B.E.
Mercurotones	Libertine	1990	The Buck Pets
Back to Skull	Snail Dust	1994	They Might Be Giants
Odelay	entire album	1996	Beck
Feel the Power	entire album	1996	Wesley Willis
Sounds of Solid	entire album	1996	Sugartooth
Bridges to Babylon	Anybody Seen My Baby?; Might As Well Get Juiced; Saint of Me	1997	The Rolling Stones
Middle of Nowhere	Thinking of You	1997	Hanson
Middle of Nowhere	MMMBop	1997	Hanson
Private Parts (soundtrack)	Tortured Man	1997	Howard Stern
Half Baked (soundtrack)	Virgin Girl	1998	Smash Mouth & Chopper
Half Baked (soundtrack)	Mary Jane	1998	Coolio
Dead Man on Campus (soundtrack)	We Still Need More (Than Anyone Has)	1998	Supergrass
Dead Man on Campus (soundtrack)	Cowboy Song	1998	Blur
Supernatural	Wishing It Was	1999	Santana
Midnite Vultures	Hollywood Freaks; Debra	1999	Beck
Hybrid Theory	With You {additional beating}	2000	Linkin Park

== Remixes ==
- King T – "Diss You" (Dust Remix) (1990)
- Nitzer Ebb – "Fun to Be Had" (1990)
- Technotronic – "This Beat Is Technotronic" (Dust Mix) (1990)
- Nikolaj Steen – "Angel" (Dust Mix) (1991)
- Shonen Knife – "Tomato Head" (Jazzy Tomato Head Mix) (1994)
- Ben Harper – "Whipping Boy" (Remix) (1994)
- Filter – "Hey Man Nice Shot" (1/4 pound mix / 1/2 oz mix Nickel Bag Mix) (1995)
- Fluke – "Bullet" (Dusty Jazz/Afro Punk Mix) (1995)
- Korn – "Shoots and Ladders" (Dust Brothers Hip Hop Mix) (1995)
- Machines of Loving Grace – "Richest Junkie Still Alive" (Dust Brothers Cherry Valley Remix) [1995)
- Whale – "HOBO HUMPIN" (doggy style) [Dust Brothers Remix] (1995)
- White Zombie – "Grease Paint and Monkey Brains" – Sin Centers Of Suburbia Mix (Explicit) (1996)
- Money Mark – "Cry" (D.B. Remix) (1996)
- Beck – "Dark and Lovely" (Remix) (1996)
- Chemical Brothers – "Electrobank" (Remix) (1997)
- The Folk Implosion – "Insinuation" (Remix) (1997)
- Sukia – "Dream Machine" (Dust Brothers Mix) (1997)
- Natural Calamity – "As You Know" (Dust Bros. Remix) (1997)
- White Zombie – "I'm Your Boogie Man" – Sex On The Rocks Mix (1997)
- Len – "Feelin' Alright" Remix (1999)
- April March – "Nothing New" (Remix) (1999)
- Morgan – "Miss Parker" (DB Remix) (1999)
