= John King (music producer) =

American record producer

John King, also known as King Gizmo, is an American music producer and one-half of the Los Angeles–based duo the Dust Brothers. As the Dust Brothers, King and Michael "E.Z. Mike" Simpson are noted for their dense sample-based music, notably on the Beastie Boys' 1989 album Paul's Boutique, and later in 1996 with Beck's Odelay.

King teamed with Medeski Martin & Wood to create their 2004 album End of the World Party (Just in Case).

He has worked with Tenacious D. The Dust Brothers also produced their early 2000s releases, Tenacious D and D Fun Pak. King returned to produce the band's follow-up and soundtrack to their 2006 film, The Pick of Destiny, for which he also wrote the instrumental score. He worked with Kyle Gass of Tenacious D on his side-project, this includes two Trainwreck releases which was going to be distributed by Epic Records.

King was nominated for an Annie Award in 2007,(the highest honor given for excellence in animation) for Best Music in an Animated Television Production for his work on the Shorty McShorts' Shorts "Boyz on Da Run" which was (created by Rob Reger and Brian Brooks)– Walt Disney Television Animation.

In 2008, he received a Grammy for his production and mixing work on Steve Earle's album Washington Square Serenade, which was awarded Best Contemporary Folk / Americana album.
