= Beck discography =

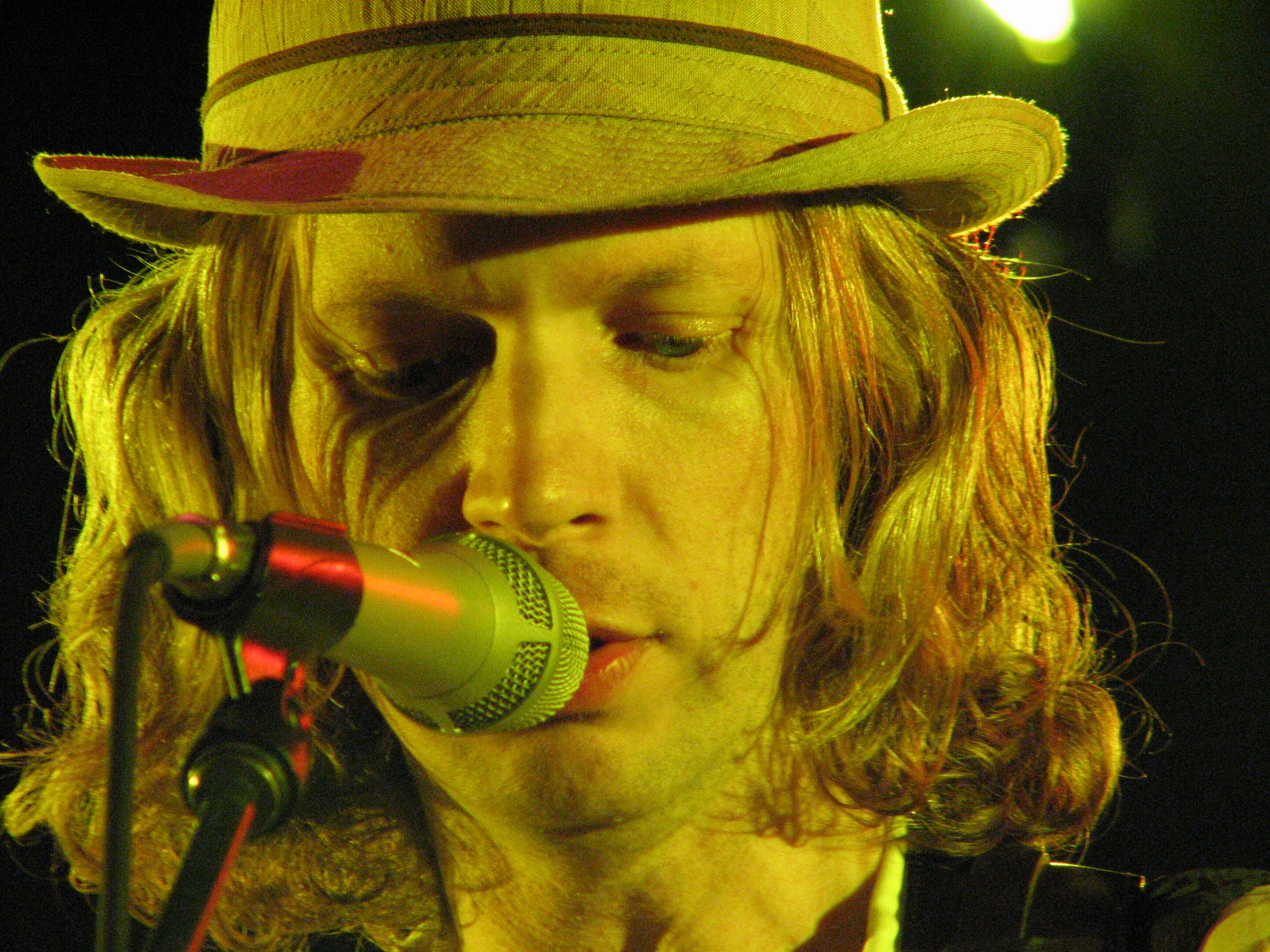
- Beck performing in 2006
- Studio albums: 15
- Extended plays: 4
- Compilation albums: 2
- Singles: 60
- Video albums: 6
- Music videos: 48
- Remix albums: 1
- Collaborations: 51
- Soundtracks: 17
- Demos: 10

The discography of Beck, an American rock musician, singer-songwriter, record producer and multi-instrumentalist, consists of 15 studio albums, one compilation album, one remix album, four extended plays (EPs) and 60 singles. With a pop art collage of musical styles, oblique and ironic lyrics, and postmodern arrangements incorporating samples, drum machines, live instrumentation and sound effects, Beck has been hailed by critics and the public throughout his musical career as being amongst the most creative and idiosyncratic musicians of 1990s and 2000s alternative rock.

Beck released his debut album Golden Feelings through independent record label Sonic Enemy in 1993. Later that year, his first singles, "Loser" and "MTV Makes Me Want to Smoke Crack", helped to quickly gain the attention of major record labels. In early 1994, after issuing Stereopathetic Soulmanure on Los Angeles-based independent Flipside Records, Beck made his major label debut with DGC Records, releasing Mellow Gold on March 1, 1994. The album's lead single "Loser" (previously available only as a standalone single on Bong Load Custom Records) reached No. 10 on the Billboard Hot 100 and helped introduce Beck to a mainstream audience. That year, he released a fourth album, One Foot in the Grave, on indie label K Records, which included appearances by members of Beat Happening, The Presidents of the United States of America and Built to Spill.

Beck released his breakthrough album Odelay on June 18, 1996, which included the successful singles "Where It's At", “Devils Haircut”, and "The New Pollution". In addition to critical acclaim, Odelay would go on to see double platinum certification in both the US and Canada. His next two albums, Mutations (1998) and Midnite Vultures (1999) maintained the eclectic sound Beck had become known for and saw favorable reviews with continued chart success. In 2002, Sea Change was released to considerable praise from both fans and critics, becoming Beck's first US Top 10 album, supported by a tour that featured The Flaming Lips as his backing band. Beck issued Guero on March 29, 2005, which would become his most successfully charting album to date, reaching No. 2 on the US Billboard 200. The album's first single "E-Pro" topped the Billboard Alternative Songs chart, a feat not achieved by any Beck song since "Loser", over a decade earlier. Two additional US Top 10 albums followed, including The Information (2006) and Modern Guilt (2008), the latter of which gave Beck his first ever Top 10 placing on the UK Albums Chart. His next album, Morning Phase (2014), won him the 2015 Grammy Award for Album of the Year.

== Albums ==
=== Studio albums ===
List of studio albums, with selected chart positions, sales figures and certifications
Title	Details	Peak chart positions										Sales	Certifications
Title	Details	US	AUS	CAN	GER	JPN	NLD	NOR	NZ	SWI	UK	Sales	Certifications
Golden Feelings	Released: March 1993; Label: Sonic Enemy (SE002); Formats: CD, cassette	—	—	—	—	—	—	—	—	—	—		
Stereopathetic Soulmanure	Released: February 22, 1994; Label: Flipside (FLIP60); Formats: CD, LP	—	—	—	—	—	—	—	—	—	—	US: 146,000	
Mellow Gold	Released: March 1, 1994; Label: DGC (24634); Formats: CD, cassette, LP	13	53	6	41	61	81	18	23	33	41	US: 1,200,000	RIAA: Platinum; BPI: Gold; MC: Platinum
One Foot in the Grave	Released: June 27, 1994; Label: K (KLP28); Formats: CD, cassette, LP	—	—	—	—	—	—	—	—	—	—	US: 226,000	
Odelay	Released: June 18, 1996; Label: DGC (24823); Formats: CD, cassette, LP	16	20	11	30	16	27	23	16	14	17	US: 2,300,000	RIAA: 2× Platinum; ARIA: Gold; BPI: Platinum; MC: 2× Platinum; RMNZ: Platinum
Mutations	Released: November 3, 1998; Label: DGC (25309); Formats: CD, cassette, LP	13	24	5	49	15	—	18	24	46	24	US: 586,000	RIAA: Gold; BPI: Gold; MC: Platinum
Midnite Vultures	Released: November 15, 1999; Label: DGC (0694904852); Formats: CD, cassette, LP	34	34	19	46	12	88	3	33	42	19	US: 743,000	RIAA: Gold; ARIA: Gold; BPI: Gold; MC: Platinum
Sea Change	Released: September 24, 2002; Label: Geffen (0694933932); Formats: CD, CD/DVD, SACD, LP	8	15	5	38	34	53	1	26	30	20	US: 680,000; UK: 90,000	RIAA: Gold; ARIA: Gold; BPI: Silver; MC: Gold
Guero	Released: March 29, 2005; Label: Interscope (B0003481); Formats: CD, CD/DVD, LP, digital download	2	14	2	33	5	38	5	30	20	15	US: 917,000	RIAA: Gold; BPI: Silver; MC: Gold
The Information	Released: October 3, 2006; Label: Interscope (B0007567); Formats: CD, LP, digital download	7	31	6	78	17	58	20	37	32	— (Note: The Information was deemed ineligible to enter the UK Albums Chart by the Official Charts Company due to its special packaging, which the company considered to give the album an unfair advantage in sales.)	US: 564,000	RIAA: Gold; MC: Gold
Modern Guilt	Released: July 8, 2008; Label: Interscope (B0011507); Formats: CD, LP, digital download	4	13	4	63	12	33	24	21	14	9	US: 262,000	
Morning Phase	Released: February 21, 2014; Label: Capitol (B001983802); Formats: CD, LP, digital download	3	5	2	13	17	5	6	8	5	4	US: 300,000	RIAA: Gold; BPI: Silver; MC: Gold
Colors	Released: October 13, 2017; Label: Capitol; Formats: CD, LP, digital download	3	14	4	32	13	14	24	8	9	5	US: 41,000	
Hyperspace	Released: November 22, 2019; Label: Capitol; Formats: CD, cassette, LP, digital download	40	33	48	—	20	46	—	—	33	33		
Ride Lonesome	Released: September 18, 2026; Label: Capitol; Formats: CD, cassette, LP, digital download	67	33	—	36	45	18	—	26	6	15		
"—" denotes a recording that did not chart or was not released in that territory.

=== Compilation albums ===
List of compilation albums, with selected chart positions
Title	Details	Peak chart positions
Title	Details	JPN
Stray Blues	Released: June 1, 2000; Label: Geffen (MVCZ10113); Formats: CD	35
Everybody's Gotta Learn Sometime	Released: February 2, 2026; Label: Capitol; Formats: Digital, vinyl	—

=== Remix albums ===
List of remix albums, with selected chart positions and sales figures
Title	Details	Peak chart positions		Sales
Title	Details	US	UK	Sales
Guerolito	Released: December 13, 2005; Label: Interscope (B0005650); Formats: CD, LP, digital download	191	131	US: 76,000

=== Demos ===
List of demo tapes
Title	Details
Banjo Story	Released: 1988
Beck and Dava	Released: 1990
We Like Folk... Who Cares... Destroy Us	Released: 1991
Bek's A Loser	Released: 1991
1992 Demo	Released: 1992
Don't Get Bent Out of Shape	Released: 1992
Healing - Are U Positive	Released: 1992
R-Marcel	Released: 1992
Beck, Like the Beer	Released: 1992
Fresh Meat + Old Slabs	Released: 1993

== Extended plays ==
List of extended plays
Title	Details
A Western Harvest Field by Moonlight	Released: January 1994; Label: Fingerpaint (Fingerpaint Records 02); Formats: 10" LP
Beck	Released: February 12, 2001; Label: DGC (0694908672); Formats: CD
Hell Yes	Released: February 1, 2005; Label: Interscope (INTR113482); Formats: CD, LP
Paisley Park Sessions	Released: November 11, 2019; Label: Capitol Records; Formats: digital download

== Singles ==
=== As lead artist ===
==== 1990s ====
List of singles released in the 1990s decade, showing selected chart positions and certifications
Title	Year	Peak chart positions										Certifications	Album
Title	Year	US	US Alt.	AUS	CAN	ICE	NLD	NZ	SCO	SWE	UK	Certifications	Album
"MTV Makes Me Want to Smoke Crack" (Note: "MTV Makes Me Want to Smoke Crack" was released as a split single with "Privates on Parade" by Bean.)	1993	—	—	—	—	—	—	—	—	—	—		Non-album singles
"Steve Threw Up"	1994	—	—	—	—	—	—	—	—	—	—		Non-album singles
"Loser"	1994	10	1	8	7	2	21	5	21	6	15	RIAA: Gold; ARIA: 3× Platinum; BPI: Gold; RMNZ: Gold	Mellow Gold
"Pay No Mind (Snoozer)"	1994	—	—	139	—	—	—	—	100	—	— (Note: "Pay No Mind (Snoozer)" did not enter the UK Singles Chart, but peaked at number 50 on the UK Physical Singles Chart Top 100.)		Mellow Gold
"Beercan"	1994	—	27	98	—	—	—	—	—	—	—		Mellow Gold
"It's All in Your Mind"	1995	—	—	—	—	—	—	—	—	—	—		One Foot in the Grave
"Where It's At"	1996	61	5	71	47	4	—	34	32	49	35		Odelay
"Devils Haircut"	1996	94	23	84	51	—	—	—	19	—	22		Odelay
"The New Pollution"	1997	78	9	—	39	9	95	—	11	—	14		Odelay
"Sissyneck"	1997	—	—	—	—	—	—	—	21	—	30		Odelay
"Jack-Ass"	1997	73	15	—	—	—	—	—	—	—	— (Note: "Jack-Ass" was deemed ineligible to enter the UK Singles Chart by the Official Charts Company, as it exceeded the maximum track length for a release to be considered a single; it did, however, peak at number five on the UK Budget Albums Chart.)		Odelay
"Deadweight"	1997	—	16	73	—	40	—	—	20	60	23		A Life Less Ordinary
"Tropicalia"	1998	—	21	—	66	15	—	49	48	—	39		Mutations
"Cold Brains"	1999	—	—	—	—	—	—	—	—	—	—		Mutations
"Nobody's Fault but My Own"	1999	—	—	—	—	—	—	—	—	—	—		Mutations
"Sexx Laws"	1999	—	21	84	—	5	—	—	21	—	27		Midnite Vultures
"—" denotes a recording that did not chart or was not released in that territory.

==== 2000s ====
List of singles released in the 2000s decade, showing selected chart positions and certifications
Title	Year	Peak chart positions										Album
Title	Year	US	US Alt.	BEL (WA)	CAN	ITA	JPN	POL	SCO	SWI Air.	UK	Album
"Mixed Bizness"	2000	—	36	—	—	—	—	—	30	—	34	Midnite Vultures
"Nicotine & Gravy"	2000	—	—	—	—	—	—	—	—	—	—	Midnite Vultures
"Lost Cause"	2002	—	36	—	—	—	—	—	—	—	—	Sea Change
"Guess I'm Doing Fine"	2002	—	—	—	—	—	—	—	—	—	—	Sea Change
"Frontin' on Debra" (with Jay-Z and Pharrell Williams)	2004	—	—	—	—	—	—	—	—	—	— (Note: "Frontin' on Debra" did not enter the UK Singles Chart, but peaked at number 23 on the UK Singles Downloads Chart.)	Non-album single
"E-Pro"	2005	65	1	—	—	46	—	—	38	—	38	Guero
"Girl"	2005	100	8	—	—	—	—	48	—	—	45	Guero
"Hell Yes"	2005	— (Note: "Hell Yes" did not enter the Billboard Hot 100, but peaked at number seven on the US Hot Singles Sales chart.)	—	—	—	—	—	—	—	—	—	Guero
"Nausea"	2006	—	13	—	—	—	—	—	—	81	—	The Information
"Cellphone's Dead"	2006	—	—	—	—	—	—	—	—	—	—	The Information
"Think I'm in Love"	2006	—	22	—	—	—	—	—	—	—	—	The Information
"Timebomb"	2007	— (Note: "Timebomb" did not enter the Billboard Hot 100, but peaked at number three on the Bubbling Under Hot 100 Singles chart, which acts as a 25-song extension to the Hot 100.)	29	—	40	—	—	—	—	—	154	Non-album single
"Chemtrails"	2008	—	—	—	—	—	—	—	—	—	—	Modern Guilt
"Gamma Ray"	2008	—	19	—	—	—	24	—	—	—	—	Modern Guilt
"Youthless"	2008	—	—	—	—	—	—	—	—	—	—	Modern Guilt
"Heaven Can Wait" (with Charlotte Gainsbourg)	2009	—	—	34	—	—	61	—	—	—	—	IRM
"—" denotes a recording that did not chart or was not released in that territory.

==== 2010s and 2020s ====
List of singles released in the 2010s and 2020s decades, showing selected chart positions and certifications
Title	Year	Peak chart positions										Certifications	Album
Title	Year	US Bub.	US Rock	BEL (FL)	CZR	CAN	FRA	ICE	JPN	POL	UK Sales	Certifications	Album
"Let's Get Lost" (with Bat for Lashes)	2011	—	—	—	—	—	—	—	—	—	— (Note: "Let's Get Lost" did not enter the UK Singles Chart, but peaked at number 25 on the UK Physical Singles Chart.)		The Twilight Saga: Eclipse soundtrack
"Looking for a Sign"	2012	—	—	—	—	—	—	—	—	—	—		Jeff, Who Lives at Home soundtrack
"I Just Started Hating Some People Today"	2012	—	—	—	—	—	—	—	—	—	—		Non-album singles
"Defriended"	2013	—	—	—	—	—	—	—	—	—	—		Non-album singles
"I Won't Be Long"	2013	—	—	—	—	—	—	—	—	—	—		Non-album singles
"Gimme"	2013	—	—	—	—	—	—	—	—	—	—		Non-album singles
"Blue Moon"	2014	9	12	— (Note: "Blue Moon" did not enter the Flanders Ultratop 50, but peaked at number 34 on the Ultratip chart.)	—	—	—	—	36	21	—		Morning Phase
"Waking Light"	2014	—	43	—	—	—	—	—	—	53	—		Morning Phase
"Say Goodbye"	2014	—	—	—	—	—	—	—	—	—	—		Morning Phase
"Heart Is a Drum"	2014	18	15	— (Note: "Heart Is a Drum" did not enter the Flanders Ultratop 50, but peaked at number 54 on the Ultratip chart.)	—	—	—	—	—	60	—		Morning Phase
"Dreams"	2015	6	9	— (Note: "Dreams" did not enter the Flanders Ultratop 50, but peaked at number 12 on the Ultratip chart.)	81	68	154	8	18	50	— (Note: "Dreams" did not enter the UK Singles Chart, but peaked at number 16 on the UK Physical Singles Chart.)	MC: Gold	Colors
"Wow"	2016	—	12	— (Note: "Wow" did not enter the Flanders Ultratop 50, but peaked at number 8 on the Ultratip chart.)	—	—	—	—	98	—	—	RIAA: Gold	Colors
"Dear Life"	2017	—	22	— (Note: "Dear Life" did not enter the Flanders Ultratop 50, but peaked at number 46 on the Ultratip chart.)	—	—	—	—	—	—	—		Colors
"Up All Night"	2017	—	10	— (Note: "Up All Night" did not enter the Flanders Ultratop 50, but peaked at number 4 on the Ultratip chart.)	—	—	117	4	46	—	—		Colors
"Colors"	2018	—	30	— (Note: "Colors" did not enter the Flanders Ultratop 50, but peaked at number 29 on the Ultratip chart.)	—	—	—	—	—	—	—		Colors
"Tarantula"	2019	—	—	— (Note: "Tarantula" did not enter the Flanders Ultratop 50, but charted as an "extra tip" on the Ultratip chart.)	—	—	—	—	—	—	—		Music Inspired by the Film Roma
"Super Cool" (featuring Robyn and The Lonely Island)	2019	—	—	— (Note: "Super Cool" did not enter the Flanders Ultratop 50, but peaked at number 46 on the Ultratip chart.)	—	—	—	—	—	—	—		The Lego Movie 2: The Second Part soundtrack
"Night Running" (with Cage the Elephant)	2019	—	29	—	—	—	—	—	—	—	—		Social Cues
"Saw Lightning"	2019	—	19	— (Note: "Saw Lightning" did not enter the Flanders Ultratop 50, but charted as an "extra tip" on the Ultratip chart.)	—	—	—	—	— (Note: "Saw Lightning" did not enter the Japan Hot 100, but peaked at number nine on the Hot Overseas chart.)	—	—		Hyperspace
"Uneventful Days"	2019	—	20	— (Note: "Uneventful Days" did not enter the Flanders Ultratop 50, but peaked at number 33 on the Ultratip chart.)	—	—	—	—	— (Note: "Uneventful Days" did not enter the Japan Hot 100, but peaked at number 16 on the Hot Overseas chart.)	—	—		Hyperspace
"Dark Places"	2019	—	—	—	—	—	—	—	—	—	—		Hyperspace
"Everlasting Nothing"	2019	—	—	—	—	—	—	—	—	—	—		Hyperspace
"No Distraction (Khruangbin Remix)"	2020	—	—	—	—	—	—	—	—	—	70		Non-album single
"Find My Way" (with Paul McCartney)	2021	—	—	—	—	—	—	—	—	—	—		McCartney III Imagined
"Old Man"	2022	—	— (Note: "Old Man" did not enter the Hot Rock & Alternative Songs Chart, but peaked at number nine on the Rock Digital Song Sales chart.)	—	—	—	—	—	—	—	—		Non-album singles
"Thinking About You"	2023	—	— (Note: "Thinking About You" did not enter the Hot Rock & Alternative Songs Chart, but peaked at number 30 on the Rock & Alternative Airplay chart.)	—	—	—	—	—	—	—	69		Non-album singles
"Odyssey" (with Phoenix)	2023	—	— (Note: "Odyssey" did not enter the Hot Rock & Alternative Songs Chart, but peaked at number one on the Adult Alternative Airplay chart.)	—	—	—	—	—	— (Note: "Odyssey" did not enter the Japan Hot 100, but peaked at number two on the Hot Overseas chart.)	—	— (Note: "Odyssey" did not enter the UK Singles Chart, but peaked at number nine on the UK Physical Singles Chart.)		Non-album singles
"Be Here Now"	2024	—	—	—	—	—	—	—	—	—	—		Non-album singles
"Ride Lonesome"	2026	—	— (Note: "Ride Lonesome" did not enter the Hot Rock & Alternative Songs Chart, but peaked at number 28 on the Rock & Alternative Airplay chart.)	—	—	—	—	—	—	—	—		Ride Lonesome
"In the Night"	2026	—	—	—	—	—	—	—	—	—	—		Ride Lonesome
"Disappearing Act"	2026	—	—	—	—	—	—	—	— (Note: "Disappearing Act" did not enter the Japan Hot 100, but peaked at number 13 on the Hot Overseas chart.)	—	—		Ride Lonesome
"—" denotes a recording that did not chart or was not released in that territory.

=== As featured artist ===
List of singles as featured artist, showing selected chart positions
Title	Year	Peak chart positions					Album
Title	Year	US AAA	US Rock DL	BEL (FL)	CZ Rock	NZ Hot	Album
"Sex with Strangers" (Marianne Faithfull featuring Beck)	2002	—	—	—	—	—	Kissin Time
"Fresh Hex" (Tobacco featuring Beck)	2010	—	—	—	—	—	Maniac Meat
"What This World Is Coming To" (Nate Ruess featuring Beck)	2015	—	43	—	—	—	Grand Romantic
"Wide Open" (The Chemical Brothers featuring Beck)	2016	—	—	— (Note: "Wide Open" did not enter the Flanders Ultratop 50, but peaked at number 8 on the Ultratip chart.)	—	—	Born in the Echoes
"The Valley of the Pagans" (Gorillaz featuring Beck)	2020	17	—	— (Note: "The Valley of the Pagans" did not enter the Flanders Ultratop 50, but peaked at number 31 on the Ultratip chart.)	—	27	Song Machine, Season One: Strange Timez
"Skipping Like a Stone" (The Chemical Brothers featuring Beck)	2023	—	—	—	—	—	For That Beautiful Feeling
"I’m With The Band" (The Black Keys featuring Beck)	2024	—	—	—	11	—	Ohio Players (Trophy Edition)
"—" denotes a recording that did not chart or was not released in that territory.

== Other charted songs ==
Title	Year	Peak chart positions									Album
Title	Year	US AAA	US Alt.	US Dance	US Rock	BEL (FL)	CAN Dig.	CAN Rock	JPN Over.	MEX Ing.	Album
"Everybody's Got to Learn Sometime"	2004	—	—	—	—	— (Note: "Everybody's Got to Learn Sometime" did not enter the Ultratop 50, but peaked at number 23 on the Flemish Back Catalogue Singles chart.)	—	—	—	—	Eternal Sunshine of the Spotless Mind OST
"Orphans"	2008	4	—	—	—	—	—	—	—	—	Modern Guilt
"Bonfire Blondes"	2008	—	—	—	—	—	68	—	—	—	"Gamma Ray" single
"Leopard-Skin Pill-Box Hat"	2011	—	—	—	—	—	—	30	—	—	War Child Presents Heroes
"Wave"	2014	—	— (Note: "Wave" did not enter the Alternative Airplay Chart, but peaked at number 17 on the Alternative Digital Song Sales chart.)	—	28	—	—	—	—	—	Morning Phase
"Country Down"	2014	—	—	—	—	— (Note: "Country Down" did not enter the Flanders Ultratop 50, but peaked at number 77 on the Ultratip chart.)	—	—	—	—	Morning Phase
"Morning"	2015	—	—	—	16	—	—	—	—	—	Morning Phase
"Cycle"	2015	—	—	—	34	—	—	—	—	—	Morning Phase
"Tiny Cities" (Flume featuring Beck)	2016	—	—	31	—	—	—	—	—	—	Skin
"Seventh Heaven"	2018	—	—	—	—	—	—	—	—	47	Colors
"Death Valley High" (with Orville Peck)	2024	7	27	—	— (Note: "Death Valley High" did not enter the Hot Rock & Alternative Songs Chart, but peaked at number 38 on the Rock & Alternative Airplay chart.)	—	—	—	—	—	Stampede
"Run Away"	2026	—	—	—	—	—	—	—	13	—	Ride Lonesome
"—" denotes a recording that did not chart or was not released in that territory.

== Collaborations ==
The following releases include contributions from Beck as a producer, songwriter and/or performer.

Year	Artist	Release	Additional information
1992	Black Fag	Parerga Y Paralipomena	Producer of EP
1994	The Jon Spencer Blues Explosion	Orange	Co-writer and vocals on "Flavor"
1994	The Geraldine Fibbers	Get Thee Gone	Writer, guitar and vocals on "Blue Cross"
1995	Caspar and Mollüsk	Caspar and Mollüsk	Vocals and noise on "Twig"
1995	Black Fag	11 Harrow House	Producer of album
1997	Forest for the Trees	Forest for the Trees	Backing vocals on "Infinite Cow", Harmonica on "Fall"
1998	Kahimi Karie	Kahimi Karie	Harmonica on "Lolitapop Dollhouse"
1998	Various artists	The Rugrats Movie soundtrack	Vocals on "This World Is Something New to Me" which includes The B-52's, B-Real, Gordon Gano, Iggy Pop, Lisa Loeb, Patti Smith and a variety of other artists
1998	Amnesia	Lingus	Harmonica on "Drop Down"
1999	Forest for the Trees	The Sound of Wet Paint	Co-writer and vocals on "Jet Engine"
	Beck and Emmylou Harris	Return of the Grievous Angel: A Tribute to Gram Parsons	Duet with Emmylou Harris on "Sin City"
2001	Air	10 000 Hz Legend	Co-writer and vocals on "The Vagabond" and "Don't Be Light", Harmonica on "The Vagabond"
2002	Marianne Faithfull	Kissin Time	Producer and writer on "Sex With Strangers", "Like Being Born" and "Nobody's Fault"; guitar, synthesizer, percussion and backing vocals on select tracks
2002	Pearl Jam	"Don't Believe in Christmas" single	Vocals and guitar on "Sleepless Nights"
2003	Macy Gray	The Trouble With Being Myself	Guitar and backing vocals on "It Ain't the Money"
2003	Pink (with William Orbit)	Charlie's Angels: Full Throttle soundtrack	Co-writer on "Feel Good Time"; later appeared on non-US versions of Try This
2004	Sia	Colour the Small One	Co-writer on "The Bully"
2005	Various artists	"Do They Know It's Hallowe'en?" single	Vocals on all versions of "Do They Know It's Hallowe'en?" which includes members of Arcade Fire, Rilo Kiley, Wolf Parade and a variety of other artists and celebrities
2007	The White Stripes	"Conquest" maxi-single	Co-producer and co-writer on "It's My Fault for Being Famous", "Cash Grab Complications on the Matter" and "Honey, We Can't Afford to Look This Cheap"
2008	Sia	Some People Have Real Problems	Backing vocals on "Academia" and "Death by Chocolate"
2009	Charlotte Gainsbourg	IRM	Producer and writer of album; guitar, bass, drum programming, synthesizer, percussion, piano, marimba, keyboard bass and vocals on select tracks
2010	Jamie Lidell	Compass	Co-writer on "Coma Chameleon"; guitar, synthesizer and backing vocals on select tracks
2010	The Jon Spencer Blues Explosion	Now I Got Worry deluxe edition	Synthesizer on "Roosevelt Hotel Blues"
2010	Tobacco	Maniac Meat	Vocals on "Fresh Hex" and "Grape Aerosmith"
2011	The Lonely Island	Turtleneck & Chain	Co-writer on "Attracted to Us"
2011	Thurston Moore	Demolished Thoughts	Producer of album; synthesizer, bass and backing vocals on select tracks
2011	Stephen Malkmus and the Jicks	Mirror Traffic	Producer of album
2012	Philip Glass, Various Artists	Rework: Philip Glass Remixed	Beck served as both a curator and a performer on the album, providing original remix content and working with American composer Philip Glass and producer Hector Castillo to locate musicians—including Amon Tobin, Tyondai Braxton, Nosaj Thing, and Memory Tapes—whose work had also been influenced by Glass
2012	Childish Gambino	R O Y A L T Y	Vocals, co-producer and co-writer on "Silk Pillow"
2014	Various Artists, including Moses Sumney, Fun., Tweedy, Norah Jones, Lord Huron, Bob Forrest, Jack White, Juanes, Laura Marling, Jarvis Cocker, David Johansen, Jason Isbell, Marc Ribot, Eleanor Friedberger, Sparks, Swamp Dogg, Jack Black, Loudon Wainwright III, and Gabriel Kahane	Song Reader	Beck wrote the songs on the album and originally released them in the form of a book of sheet music. He produced the album with Randall Poster and performed the song "Heaven's Ladder".
2015	Nate Ruess	Grand Romantic	Vocals on "What This World Is Coming To"
2015	The Chemical Brothers	Born in the Echoes	Vocals and co-producer of the song "Wide Open"
2016	M83	Junk	Vocals on "Time Wind"
2016	Flume	Skin	Vocals on "Tiny Cities"
2016	Lady Gaga	Joanne	Co-writer on "Dancin' in Circles"
2019	Cage the Elephant	Social Cues	Vocals on "Night Running"
2020	Gorillaz	Song Machine, Season One: Strange Timez	Vocals on "The Valley of the Pagans"
2023	Gorillaz	Cracker Island	Vocals on "Possession Island"
2023	The Chemical Brothers	For That Beautiful Feeling	Vocals on "Skipping Like A Stone"
2023	Willie Nelson	Long Story Short: Willie Nelson 90 - Live at the Hollywood Bowl	Vocals on "Blue Eyes Crying in the Rain" and "Hands on the Wheel"
2024	Hinds	Viva Hinds	Vocals on "Boom Boom Back"
2024	Orville Peck	Stampede	Vocals on "Death Valley High"

=== Remix contributions ===
The following releases feature songs that have been remixed by Beck.

Year	Artist	Release	Song(s)	Additional information
1995	The Jon Spencer Blues Explosion	Experimental Remixes	"Flavor Part 1" and "Flavor Part 2" (with Mario Caldato Jr. and Mike D)	
1998	Air	"Kelly Watch the Stars" single	"Sexy Boy" (Sex Kino Mix); later appeared on Moon Safari reissue	
1998	Björk	"Alarm Call" single	"Alarm Call" (Bjeck Mix)	
2000	David Bowie	"Seven" single	"Seven" (Beck Mix); later appeared on Hours reissue	
2007	Dr. Dog	"The Girl" (Beck Remix) single	"The Girl" (Beck Remix)	
2010	Norah Jones	Chasing Pirates remix EP	"Chasing Pirates" (Droogs Remix)	
2010	Lykke Li	Get Some iTunes EP	"Get Some" (Beck Remix)	
2012	The White Stripes	The White Stripes/The Dead Weather split	"The Hardest Button to Button" (Beck Remix)	Only available as part of Third Man Records Vault series
2012	Philip Glass	Rework: Philip Glass Remixed	"NYC: 73–78" (Beck Remix)	Beck served as both a curator and a performer on the album, which was produced in honor of the 75th birthday of American composer Philip Glass.
2013	JJ Doom	Bookhead EP	"Banished" (Beck Remix)	

=== Record Club ===
In 2009, Beck founded Record Club, an informal meeting of various musicians with the goal of recording an album in one day. To date, albums covered include:

- The Velvet Underground & Nico (originally performed by The Velvet Underground)
- Songs of Leonard Cohen (originally performed by Leonard Cohen)
- Oar (originally performed by Skip Spence)
- Kick (originally performed by INXS)
- Yanni Live at the Acropolis (originally performed by Yanni)

== Soundtracks ==
The following is a list of Beck songs that have appeared on film, games and television soundtracks.

Year	Song(s)	Soundtrack	Label(s)
1997	"Leave Me On the Moon" "Last Night I Traded My Soul's Innermost for Some Pickled Fish" "Underwater Music"	Kill the Moonlight: The Motion Picture Soundtrack	Sympathy for the Record Industry
1997	"Deadweight"	A Life Less Ordinary Original Soundtrack	A&M Records
1997	"Feather in Your Cap"	SubUrbia: Original Motion Picture Soundtrack	Geffen Records
1999	"Drivin' Nails in My Coffin" (with Willie Nelson)	The Hi-Lo Country Motion Picture Soundtrack	TVT Records
2001	"Diamond Dogs"	Moulin Rouge! Music from Baz Luhrmann's Film	Universal Music
2004	"Everybody's Got to Learn Sometime" (with Jon Brion)	Eternal Sunshine of the Spotless Mind Original Soundtrack	Hollywood Records
2006	"There is No Place in This World for Me" "10,000 Pesos" "Tender Beasts of the Spangled Night"	Nacho Libre: Music from the Motion Picture	Lakeshore Records
2010	"Bad Blood"	True Blood: Music from the HBO Original Series, Vol. 2	Elektra Records
2010	"Let's Get Lost" (with Bat for Lashes)	The Twilight Saga: Eclipse: Original Motion Picture Soundtrack	Atlantic/Chop Shop Records
2010	"Ramona" (acoustic version) "Ramona" "Garbage Truck" (deluxe edition bonus) "Threshold" (deluxe edition bonus) "Summertime" (deluxe edition bonus)	Scott Pilgrim vs. the World: Original Motion Picture Soundtrack	ABKCO Records
2010	"Katayanagi Twins vs. Sex Bob-Omb" (with Cornelius)	Scott Pilgrim vs. the World: Original Score	ABKCO Records
2012	"Looking for a Sign"	Jeff, Who Lives at Home Soundtrack (iTunes only single)	Iliad Records
2012	"Cities"	Sound Shapes Soundtrack (in-game exclusive)	Queasy Games
2017	"Fourteen Rivers, Fourteen Floods"	Music from The American Epic Sessions: Original Motion Picture Soundtrack	Lo-Max/Columbia/Third Man
2019	"Super Cool" (with Robyn and The Lonely Island)	The Lego Movie 2: The Second Part Original Motion Picture Soundtrack	WaterTower Music
2019	"Tarantula"	Music Inspired by the Film Roma	Sony Music

== Compilation appearances ==
The following is a list of non-album tracks by Beck that have appeared on compilations, including tributes and samplers.

=== Studio ===
Year	Song	Compilation	Label
1994	"The World May Loose its Motion"	Periscope: Another Yoyo Compilation	Yoyo Recordings
1994	"In a Cold Ass Fashion"	Jabberjaw: Good to the Last Drop	Mammoth Records
1994	"Bogusflow"	DGC Rarities Volume 1	DGC Records
1995	"Girl of My Dreams" (with members of That Dog)	The Poop Alley Tapes: A Compilation of 31 Los Angeles Bands	WIN Records
1995	"Trouble All My Days"	Fast Forward Sampler: 2nd Edition	Brinkman Records
1996	"Clock"	Swagalicious!	Geffen Records
1996	"Title Unknown, Sleeping Bag"	Yo Yo a Go Go	Yoyo Recordings
1996	"Novacane"	Buy-Product 2: Brief Encounters	Geffen Records
1996	"The Little Drum Machine Boy"	Just Say Noël	Geffen Records
1997	"Lampshade"	Modern Day Paintings by Original Artists	Fingerpaint Records
1998	"Close to God"	Selector Dub Narcotic	K Records
1999	"Electric Music and the Summer People"	MOM 3: Music For Our Mother Ocean	Hollywood Records
1999	"Sin City" (with Emmylou Harris)	Return of the Grievous Angel: A Tribute to Gram Parsons	Almo Sounds
1999	"Halo of Gold"	More Oar: A Tribute to the Skip Spence Album	Birdman Records
2000	"Boyz"	At Home with the Groovebox	Grand Royal Records
2000	"Put It in Neutral"	Hot Wild Drive in the City – Car Compilation	Gusto Productions
2001	"Your Cheatin' Heart"	Timeless: Hank Williams Tribute	Lost Highway
2001	"Stagolee"	Avalon Blues: A Tribute to the Music of Mississippi John Hurt	Vanguard Records
2003	"I'm So Glad"	Martin Scorsese Presents the Blues: The Soul of a Man	Columbia Records
2004	"True Love Will Find You in the End"	The Late Great Daniel Johnston: Discovered Covered	Gammon Records
2005	"Funky Lil' Song"	Dimension Mix: A Tribute to Dimension 5 Records	Eenie Meenie Records
2009	"Leopard-Skin Pill-Box Hat"	War Child Presents Heroes	Astralwerks
2012	"Corrina, Corrina"	Every Mother Counts 2012	Starbucks Entertainment
2012	"Michelangelo Antonioni"	A Tribute to Caetano Veloso	Universal Music
2014	"Love"	Sweetheart: Our Favorite Artists Play Their Favorite Love Songs	Starbucks Entertainment

=== Live, remix, and demo versions ===
Year	Song	Compilation	Label
1993	"Whiskey-Faced, Radioactive, Blowdryin' Lady"	KXLU 88.9 FM Los Angeles – Live, Volume One	no label
1994	"Mexico"	Rare on Air: Live Performances Vol. 1	Mammoth Records
1996	"Thunder Peel" (alternate version)	Volume +it 16: Copulation Explosion!	Volume
1996	"Make Out City (Where It's At Remix)"	Vans Warped Music Sampler	Uni Distribution
1996	"Untitled"	KXLU 88.9 FM Demolisten: Volume 2	No Life Records
1997	"It's All in Your Mind"	The Bridge School Concerts Vol. One	Reprise Records
1997	"One Foot in the Grave"	WBCN Naked Disc: A Collection of Unreleased Performances	Wicked Disc
1997	"Asshole"	Tibetan Freedom Concert	Capitol Records
1998	"Close to God"	Selector Dub Narcotic	K Records
1999	"Nobody's Fault but My Own"	SNL25: Saturday Night Live – The Musical Performances Volume 2	DreamWorks Records
2000	"Peach Picking Time Down in Georgia" (with Willie Nelson)	Farm Aid Volume One: Live	Redline Entertainment
2001	"Debra"	2 Meter Sessies Volume 10	Universal TV
2001	"Lonesome Whistle"	KCRW: Sounds Eclectic	Palm Pictures
2005	"Round the Bend"	Gilles Peterson Presents the BBC Sessions Volume 1	Ether Records
2006	"Nausea (The Chap Remix)"	99X // Live X 11 – Strange Apparition	no label
2007	"Lost Cause"	The Saturday Sessions: The Dermot O'Leary Show	EMI Records
2007	"Black Tambourine" (film version)	David Lynch's Inland Empire Soundtrack	David Lynch Music Company
2007	"Nausea"	Live from SNL: Music Performances from Saturday Night Live	Sony BMG Music
2010	"Volcano" (acoustic version)	Hear to Help: A Compilation Benefitting the Haiti Recovery Effort	no label

== Videography ==
=== Video albums and TV broadcasts ===
Title	Album details
Sessions at West 54th (September 5, 1997)	Released: November 8, 1997; Label: American Public Television; Format: Broadcast
BBC Four Sessions (Live in London)	Released: April 28, 2003; Label: BBC Four; Format: Broadcast
Guero (Deluxe Edition)	Released: March 29, 2005; Label: Interscope Records; Format: CD/DVD, UMD
Beck (Video Album) (iTunes)	Released: January 1, 2006; Label: Interscope Records; Format: Download/Streaming
The Information (Bonus Video Version)	Released: October 3, 2006; Label: Interscope Records; Format: CD/DVD/Download/Streaming
The Information (Deluxe Edition)	Released: February 27, 2007; Label: Interscope Records; Format: 2xCD/DVD
On Stage (NYC 1997)	Released: January 1, 2012; Label: Immortal Video; Format: DVD (Europe)
Live at Budokan (Japan 2000)	Released: January 1, 2013; Label: Immortal Video; Format: DVD (Europe)
Festival We Love Green (Bois de Vincennes, Paris, France)	Released: June 2, 2018; Label: Arte Concert; Format: Broadcast/Streaming

=== Music videos ===
Year	Song	Director	Album
1993	"Loser"	Steve Hanft	Mellow Gold
1994	"Pay No Mind (Snoozer)"	Steve Hanft	Mellow Gold
1994	"Beercan"	Steve Hanft	Mellow Gold
1994	"Fuckin' with My Head (Mountain Dew Rock)"	Ross Harris	Mellow Gold
1996	"Where It's At"	Steve Hanft	Odelay
1996	"Devils Haircut"	Mark Romanek	Odelay
1997	"The New Pollution"	Beck Hansen	Odelay
1997	"Jack-Ass"	Steve Hanft	Odelay
1997	"Deadweight"	Michel Gondry	Odelay: Deluxe Edition
1999	"Sexx Laws"	Beck Hansen	Midnite Vultures
2000	"Mixed Bizness"	Stéphane Sednaoui	Midnite Vultures
2000	"Nicotine & Gravy"	Fullerene	Midnite Vultures
2002	"Lost Cause: Version 1"	Garth Jennings	Sea Change
2002	"Lost Cause: Version 2"	Michael Palmeri	Sea Change
2002	"Guess I'm Doing Fine"	Spike Jonze	Sea Change
2002	"Little One"	Michael Palmieri	Sea Change
2002	"The Golden Age"	Steve Hanft	Sea Change
2002	"Round the Bend"	Jeremy Blake	Sea Change
2002	"Lonesome Tears"	Jason Lee	Sea Change
2005	"E-Pro"	Shynola	Guero
2005	"Girl"	Motion Theory	Guero
2005	"Hell Yes"	Garth Jennings	Guero
2005	"Black Tambourine"	Associates in Science	Guero
2005	"Ghettochip Malfunction"	Mumbleboy	GameBoy Variations
2005	"Gameboy/Homeboy"	Wyld File	GameBoy Variations
2005	"Bad Cartridge"	Wyld File	GameBoy Variations
2005	"Bit Variations in B-Flat"	Wyld File	GameBoy Variations
2005	"Funky Lil' Song"	Ross Harris, Joel Fox	Dimension Mix
2006	"Nausea: Version 2"	Patrick Daughters	The Information
2006	"Nausea: Version 3"		The Information
2006	"Nausea: Version 4"		The Information
2006	"Cellphone's Dead: Version 2"	Michel Gondry	The Information
2006	"Think I'm in Love"	Beck, Autumn de Wilde	The Information
2006	"1000 BPM"		The Information
2008	"Gamma Ray: Version 1"		Modern Guilt
2008	"Gamma Ray: Version 2"	Jess Holzworth	Modern Guilt
2008	"Youthless"	Kris Moyes	Modern Guilt
2008	"Orphans"		Modern Guilt
2008	"Replica"		Modern Guilt
2008	"Modern Guilt"	Jess Holzworth	Modern Guilt
2014	"Heart Is a Drum"	Sophie Muller	Morning Phase
2016	"Wow"	Grady Hall, Beck	Colors
2017	"Up All Night"	Canada	Colors
2017	"Colors" (Slime Visualizer)	Brook Linder	Colors
2018	"Colors"	Edgar Wright	Colors
2019	"Uneventful Days"	Dev Hynes	Hyperspace
2022	"Old Man"	Jordan McMonagle	N/A
2023	"Thinking About You"		N/A
