= Pharrell Williams production discography =

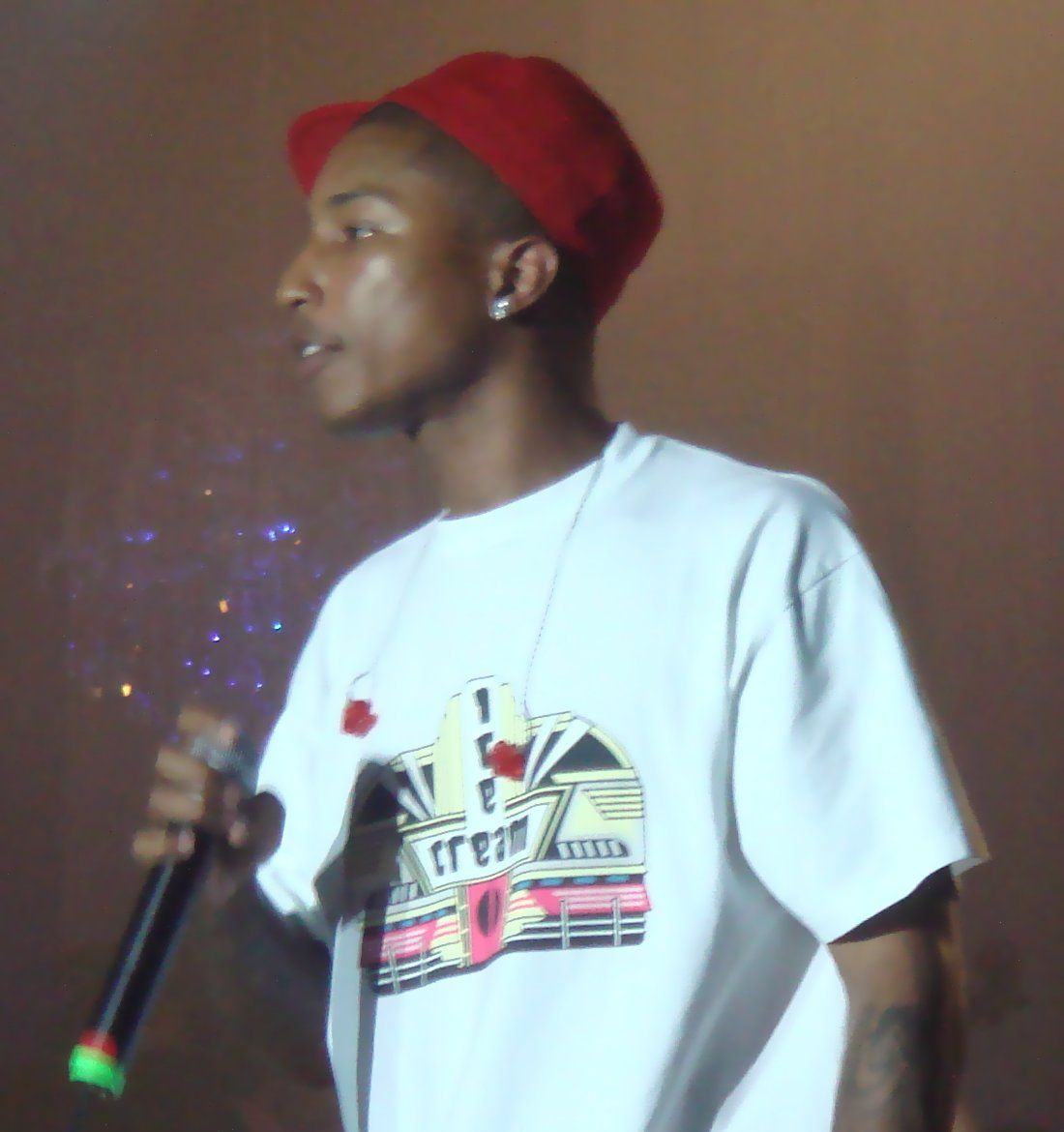
Williams at the Nokia Theater in Times Square in September 2006.

The following list is a partial discography of productions by Pharrell Williams, an American musician and record producer from Virginia Beach, Virginia. It includes songs produced, co-produced and remixed, listed by year, artist and album. For songs produced only by the Neptunes, a production duo including Williams, see the Neptunes production discography.

This discography notes contributions made solely by Pharrell, alongside those he worked on with the Neptunes and N.E.R.D. and those where these artists have featured appearances.

== 1992 ==
=== Wreckx-N-Effect - Hard or Smooth ===
- 01. "Rump Shaker"
- 02. "New Jack Swing, Pt. 2"

== 1993 ==
=== Blackstreet - Blackstreet ===
- "Baby Be Mine" {Did Not Produce}

== 1994 ==
=== Blackstreet - Blackstreet ===
- "Tonight's the Night" {Did Not Produce}

== 1996 ==
=== Total - Total ===
- "When Boy Meets Girl" (produced with Sean Combs)

=== SWV - New Beginning ===
- "Use Your Heart"
- "Use Your Heart (Interlude)"
- "When This Feeling"

== 1997 ==
=== Mase - Harlem World ===
- "Lookin' at Me" (feat. Puff Daddy)

== 1998 ==
=== Clipse - Non-album single ===
- "Got Caught Dealin'"

=== Dr. Dre - Bulworth OST ===
- "Zoom" (with LL Cool J) {Did Not Produce}

=== Noreaga - N.O.R.E. ===
- "Superthug"

=== MC Lyte - Seven & Seven ===
- "I Can't Make a Mistake"
- "It's All Yours" (feat. Gina Thompson)
- "Closer" (feat. Space Nine)

=== Brand Nubian - Foundation ===
- "Take It to the Head (Remix)"

=== Redman - Doc's da Name 2000 ===
- "I Don't Kare" {Did Not Produce}

== 1999 ==
=== Harlem World - The Movement ===
- "One Big Fiesta" (feat. Mase)
- "Not the Kids" (feat. Rashad)

=== Clipse - Non-album single ===
- "The Funeral"

=== Noreaga - Melvin Flynt - Da Hustler ===
- "Cocaine Business (Hysteria)" (feat. Kelis)
- "Oh No"

=== Ol' Dirty Bastard - Nigga Please ===
- "Got Your Money" (feat. Kelis)
- "Recognize" (feat. Chris Rock and Pharrell Williams)
- "Cold Blooded"

=== Half a Mill - Milíon ===
- "Thug Onez" (feat. Noreaga, Musalini and Kool G Rap)

=== Prince - Rave Un2 the Joy Fantastic ===
- "The Greatest Romance Ever Sold (Remix)" (feat. Q-Tip)

=== Kelis - Kaleidoscope ===
- "Intro"
- "Good Stuff" (feat. Terrar)
- "Caught Out There"
- "Get Along with You"
- "Mafia" (feat. Markita)
- "Game Show"
- "Suspended"
- "Mars"
- "Ghetto Children" (feat. Marc Dorsey and N.E.R.D.)
- "I Want Your Love"
- "No Turning Back"
- "Roller Rink"
- "In the Morning"
- "Wouldn't You Agree" (feat. Justin Vince)

== 2000 ==
=== Cuban Link - 24K ===
- "Still Telling Lies" (feat. Tony Sunshine)

=== Mike E - Master Plan ===
- "Look in the Water"
- "No Doubt"
- "What Can I Do"
- "Say the Word"
- "More and More"
- "Stay Home"
- "Before We Get Too Close"

=== Angie Stone - Black Diamond ===
- "Everyday (Remix)"

=== Beenie Man - Art and Life ===
- "Ola" (feat. Steve Perry)
- "Girls Dem Sugar" (feat. Mýa)
- "Jamaica Way" (feat. Kelis)

=== Mystikal - Let's Get Ready ===
- "Shake Ya Ass"
- "Jump"
- "Danger (Been So Long)"

=== Shyne - Shyne ===
- "Niggas Gonna Die"

=== All Saints - Saints & Sinners ===
- "Black Coffee (Remix)"

=== Guru - Guru's Jazzmatazz, Vol. 3 ===
- "All I Said" (feat. Macy Gray)
- "Supa Love" (feat. Kelis)

=== Philly's Most Wanted - Get Down or Lay Down ===
- "Cross the Border"

=== Ludacris - Back for the First Time ===
- "Southern Hospitality" (feat. Pharrell Williams)

=== Jay-Z - The Dynasty: Roc La Familia ===
- "I Just Wanna Love U (Give It 2 Me)"

=== Shea Seger - The May Street Project ===
- "Blind Situation" (feat. Pharrell Williams)

== 2001 ==
=== Backstreet Boys - Black & Blue ===
- "The Call (Remix)" (feat. Pharrell Williams and Clipse)

=== Musalini - Non-album single ===
- "Thugmania (Rock wit Us)" (solo or feat. Capone-N-Noreaga)

=== Angie Martinez - Up Close and Personal ===
- "Dem Thangz" (feat. Pharrell Williams and Q-Tip) (produced with Salaam Remi)

=== Busta Rhymes - Genesis ===
- "What It Is" (feat. Kelis)
- "As I Come Back"
- "Pass the Courvoisier" (feat. P Diddy)

=== Ray J - This Ain't a Game ===
- "Wait a Minute" (feat. Pharrell Williams and Lil' Kim)
- "Formal Invite" (feat. Pharrell Williams)
- "Out of the Ghetto" (feat. Shorty Mack)

=== Babyface - Face2Face ===
- "There She Goes"
- "Stressed Out"

=== P Diddy - The Saga Continues... ===
- "Diddy" (feat. the Neptunes)

=== T.I. - I'm Serious ===
- "I'm Serious" (feat. Beenie Man)
- "What's Yo Name" (feat. Pharrell Williams)

=== The Liks - X.O. Experience ===
- "Best U Can" (feat. Pharrell Williams)

=== Foxy Brown - Broken Silence ===
- "Candy" (feat. Kelis)
- "Gangsta Boogie"

=== NSYNC - Celebrity ===
- "Girlfriend" (solo or feat. Nelly)

=== Hikaru Utada - Rush Hour 2 OST ===
- "Blow My Whistle" (with Foxy Brown)

=== Jadakiss - Kiss tha Game Goodbye ===
- "Knock Yourself Out" (feat. Pharrell Williams)

=== Philly's Most Wanted - Get Down or Lay Down ===
- "Radikal"
- "Suckas"
- "Pretty Tony"
- "Please Don't Mind"
- "Philly Celebrities"
- "Ladies Choice"
- "The Question"
- "Dream Car" (feat. Pharrell Williams)
- "Suckas, Pt. 2" (feat. Beanie Sigel)
- "Street Tax" (feat. Clipse)

=== Usher - 8701 ===
- "I Don't Know" (feat. P Diddy)
- "U Don't Have to Call"

=== Mary J. Blige - No More Drama ===
- "Steal Away" (feat. Pharrell Williams)

=== Clipse - Training Day OST ===
- "Guns N' Roses"

=== Fabolous - Ghetto Fabolous ===
- "Young'n (Holla Back)"

=== Latrelle - Non-album single ===
- "Dirty Girl"

=== Nivea - Nivea ===
- "Run Away (I Wanna Be with U)" (feat. Pusha T)

=== Britney Spears - Britney ===
- "I'm a Slave 4 U"
- "Boys"

=== Kelis - Wanderland ===
- "Young, Fresh n' New"
- "Intro"
- "Flash Back"
- "Popular Thug" (feat. Pusha T)
- "Daddy" (feat. Malice)
- "Scared Money"
- "Shooting Stars"
- "Digital World" (feat. Roscoe)
- "Perfect Day"
- "Easy Come, Easy Go"
- "Junkie"
- "Get Even"
- "Mr. UFO Man" (feat. John Otsby)
- "Little Suzie"
- "Star Wars"
- "I Don't Care Anymore"

=== Alana Davis - Fortune Cookies ===
- "Bye Bye"

=== Faith Evans - Faithfully ===
- "Burnin' Up" (solo or feat. Missy Elliott)

=== Ludacris - The Good Life ===
- "Fatty Girl (Remix)" (with LL Cool J and Keith Murray)

=== Ice Cube - Greatest Hits ===
- "In the Late Night Hour" (feat. the Neptunes and Clipse)

=== Mystikal - Tarantula ===
- "Bouncin' Back (Bumpin' Me Against the Wall)"
- "Go 'Head"
- "The Return"

=== No Doubt - Rock Steady ===
- "Hella Good"

=== Lil' Bow Wow - Doggy Bag ===
- "Take Ya Home"

== 2002 ==
=== Royce da 5'9" - Rock City EP ===
- "She's the One" (feat. Tre Little)

=== Busta Rhymes - Non-album single ===
- "Pass the Courvoisier, Part II" (feat. P Diddy and Pharrell)

=== Nelly - Nellyville ===
- "Hot in Herre"

=== Latrelle - Non-album single ===
- "House Party"

=== Clipse - Lord Willin' ===
- "Grindin'"
- "When the Last Time"
- "Intro"
- "Young Boy"
- "Virginia"
- "Cot Damn" (feat. Ab-Liva and Roscoe)
- "Ma, I Don't Love Her" (feat. Faith Evans)
- "FamLay Freestyle" (feat. Fam-Lay)
- "Ego"
- "Comedy Central" (feat. Fabolous)
- "Let's Talk About It" (with Jermaine Dupri)
- "Gangsta Lean"
- "I'm Not You" (feat. Jadakiss, Styles P and Roscoe)

=== N.O.R.E. - God's Favorite ===
- "Nothin'" (feat. Pharrell Williams)
- "Grimey"
- "Full Mode"
- "Head Bussa"
- "Consider This" (feat. Kelis)

=== Beyoncé - Austin Powers in Gold: OST ===
- "Work It Out" (produced with Beyoncé)

=== Beenie Man - Tropical Storm ===
- "Feel It Boy" (feat. Janet Jackson)
- "Bad Girl" (feat. Justin Vince)
- "Bossman" (feat. Lady Saw and Sean Paul)

=== Scarface - The Fix ===
- "Someday" (feat. Faith Evans)

=== LL Cool J - 10 ===
- "Luv U Better"
- "Niggy Nuts"
- "Amazin'" (feat. Kandice Love)
- "Clockin' G's"
- "U Should"

=== Justin Timberlake - Justified ===
- "Like I Love You" (feat. Clipse)
- "Señorita"
- "Take It from Here"
- "Rock Your Body"
- "Nothin' Else"
- "Last Night"
- "Let's Take a Ride"

=== TLC - 3D ===
- "In Your Arms Tonight"

=== Toni Braxton - More Than a Woman ===
- "Hit the Freeway" (feat. Loon)

=== Snoop Dogg - Paid tha Cost to Be da Boss ===
- "From tha Chuuuch to da Palace" (feat. Pharrell Williams)
- "Beautiful" (feat. Pharrell Williams and Charlie Wilson)

=== Ms. Jade - Girl Interrupted ===
- "The Come Up"

=== Common - Electric Circus ===
- "Come Close" (feat. Mary J. Blige)
- "I Got a Right Ta" (feat. Pharrell Williams)

=== Jay-Z - The Blueprint 2 ===
- "Excuse Me Miss"
- "Fuck All Nite"
- "Nigga Please" (feat. Young Chris)
- "Ballad for the Fallen Soldier" (feat. Pharrell and Marc Dorsey)

=== Sean Paul - Dutty Rock ===
- "Bubble" (feat. Fahrenheit)

=== Ja Rule - The Last Temptation ===
- "Pop Niggas"

=== Baby - Birdman ===
- "What Happened to That Boy" (feat. Clipse)

=== Busta Rhymes - It Ain't Safe No More... ===
- "Call the Ambulance" (feat. Rampage)

=== Royce da 5'9" - Rock City (Verson 2.0) ===
- "Off Parole" (feat. Tre Little)
- "Mr. Baller" (feat. Pharrell Williams, Tre Little and Clipse)

=== 702 - Star ===
- "Star" (feat. Clipse)
- "I Still Love You" (feat. Pharrell Williams)

=== Solange - Solo Star ===
- "Crush"

== 2003 ==
=== Roscoe - Hazardous Life: The Mixtape ===
- "Delinquent" (feat. Pharrell Williams)

=== Jay-Z - Blueprint 2.1 ===
- "La-La-La (Excuse Me Miss Again)"

=== Foxy Brown - Non-album single ===
- "Magnetic"

=== Ludacris - Chicken-n-Beer ===
- "P-Poppin'" (feat. Shawnna and Lil' Fate) (produced with Zukhan Bey)

=== Nas - Charlie's Angels: FT OST ===
- "Nas' Angels... The Flyest" (feat. Pharrell Williams)

=== Chingy - Jackpot ===
- "Mad @ Me"

=== Royce da 5'9" - Non-album single ===
- "Make This Run" (feat. Kelis and Pharrell Williams)

=== Sirens - Control Freaks ===
- "Things Are Gettin' Better"

=== Nelly - Da Derrty Versions ===
- "If"

=== Lil' Bow Wow - Unleashed ===
- "The Don, The Dutch"
- "The Movement"
- "I'll Move On" (feat. Mario)

=== Kelis - Tasty ===
- "Milkshake"
- "Flashback"
- "Protect My Heart"
- "Sugar Honey Iced Tea"
- "Rolling Through the Hood"

=== Solange - The Fighting Temptations OST ===
- "Don't Fight the Feeling" (feat. Papa Reu)

=== Jay-Z - The Black Album ===
- "Change Clothes" (feat. Pharrell Williams)
- "Allure"

=== Justin Timberlake - Live from London ===
- "I'm Lovin' It" (feat. Vanessa Marquez)

== 2004 ==
=== Usher - Yeah! EP ===
- "Sweet Lies"

=== Cee-Lo Green - ...Is the Soul Machine ===
- "The Art of Noise" (feat. Pharrell Williams)
- "Let's Stay Together" (feat. Pharrell Williams)

=== Nigo - (B)ape Sounds ===
- "Planet of the (B)apes"

=== Fam-Lay - Traintago ===
- "Fresh N' Drivin'" (feat. Pharrell Williams)
- "Git Busy"

=== Beyoncé - 46664 The Event ===
- "American Prayer" (with Bono, the Edge and Dave Stewart)

=== Beyoncé - Live at Wembley ===
- "My First Time"

=== Jadakiss - Kiss of Death ===
- "Hot Sauce to Go" (feat. Pharrell Williams)

=== Nelly - Sweat ===
- "Flap Your Wings"

=== Nelly - Suit ===
- "Play it Off" (feat. Pharrell Williams)

=== Snoop Dogg - R&G: The Masterpiece ===
- "Drop It Like It's Hot" (feat. Pharrell Williams)
- "Let's Get Blown" (feat. Pharrell Williams)
- "Perfect" (feat. Charlie Wilson)
- "Signs" (feat. Justin Timberlake and Charlie Wilson)
- "Pass It Pass It"

=== Talib Kweli - The Beautiful Struggle ===
- "Broken Glass"

=== Fabolous - Real Talk ===
- "Tit 4 Tat" (feat. Pharrell Williams)
- "Young & Sexy" (feat. Pharrell Williams and Mike Shorey)

=== HBMS - White People ===
- "Class System" (feat. Pharrell Williams and Julee Cruise)

=== Gwen Stefani - Love. Angel. Music. Baby. ===
- "Hollaback Girl"

=== Mac Mall - Illegal Game ===
- "Party People" (with JT the Bigga Figga feat. Ray Luv) (produced with JT the Bigga Figga)

=== Lil Jon - Crunk Juice ===
- "Stick That Thang Out" (feat. Pharrell and Ying Yang Twins)

=== T.I. - Urban Legend ===
- "Freak Though" (feat. Pharrell Williams)

== 2005 ==
=== Omarion - O ===
- "Touch"

=== Beanie Sigel - The B. Coming ===
- "Don't Stop" (feat. Snoop Dogg)

=== Faith Evans - The First Lady ===
- "Goin' Out" (feat. Pharrell Williams and Pusha T)

=== Mariah Carey - The Emancipation of Mimi ===
- "Say Somethin'" (feat. Snoop Dogg)
- "To the Floor" (feat. Nelly)

=== Q-Tip - Non-album single ===
- "For the Nasty" (feat. Busta Rhymes)

=== Missy Elliott - The Cookbook ===
- "On & On"

=== Slim Thug - Already Platinum ===
- "I Ain't Heard of That" (feat. Bun B)
- "Like a Boss"
- "I Ain't Heard of That (Remix)" (feat. Bun B and Pharrell Williams)
- "Click Clack" (feat. Pusha T)
- "Already Platinum" (feat. Pharrell Williams)
- "Ashy to Classy"
- "Playa Ya Don't Know"
- "This is My Life" (feat. LeToya Luckett)
- "Delicate"

=== Robin Thicke - The Evolution of Robin Thicke ===
- "Wanna Love U Girl" (feat. Pharrell Williams)

=== Fam-Lay - Dat Missile ===
- "Amalance"

=== Skillz - Confessions of a Ghostwriter ===
- "Suzie Q" (feat. Cee-Lo Green and Jazze Pha)

=== Twista - The Day After ===
- "Lavish" (feat. Pharrell Williams)
- "When I Get You Home" (feat. Pharrell and Jamie Foxx)

=== Teriyaki Boyz - Beef or Chicken ===
- "Cho Large" (feat. Pharrell Williams)

== 2006 ==
=== Shawnna - Block Music ===
- "Gettin' Some (Remix)" (feat. Ludacris, Pharrell, Lil Wayne and Too $hort) {Did Not Produce}

=== T.I. - King ===
- "Goodlife/Phone Call" (feat. Pharrell, Common and Mike Epps)

=== LL Cool J - Todd Smith ===
- "Best Dress" (feat. Jamie Foxx)

=== Fam-Lay - Dat Missile ===
- "Da Deeper Record"

=== Paul Oakenfold - A Lively Mind ===
- "Sex 'N' Money" (feat. Pharrell Williams) {Did Not Produce}

=== Rampage - Have You Seen? ===
- "I'm Rollin with You"

=== Sleepy Brown - Mr. Brown ===
- "Margarita" (feat. Pharrell Williams and Big Boi)

=== Teriyaki Boyz - F&F: Tokyo Drift OST ===
- "Tokyo Drift"

=== Field Mob - Light Poles and Pine Trees ===
- "I Hate You" {Did Not Produce}

=== Ludacris - Release Therapy ===
- "Money Maker" (feat. Pharrell Williams)
- "Girls Gone Wild"

=== Lupe Fiasco - Lupe Fiasco's Food & Liquor ===
- "I Gotcha"

=== Beyoncé - B'Day ===
- "Kitty Kat" (produced with Beyoncé)
- "Green Light" (produced with Beyoncé)
- "My First Time" (produced with Beyoncé)

=== Cassius - 15 Again ===
- "Eye Water" (feat. Pharrell Williams) {Did Not Produce}

=== P Diddy - Press Play ===
- "Partners for Life" (feat. Jamie Foxx)

=== Pitbull - El Mariel ===
- "Jealouso"

=== Jay-Z - Kingdom Come ===
- "Anything" (feat. Usher and Pharrell Williams)

=== Snoop Dogg - Tha Blue Carpet Treatment ===
- "Vato" (feat. B-Real)
- "10 Lil' Crips"

=== Clipse - Hell Hath No Fury ===
- "We Got It for Cheap (Intro)"
- "Momma I'm So Sorry"
- "Mr. Me Too" (feat. Pharrell Williams)
- "Ride Around Shining" (feat. Ab Liva)
- "Wamp Wamp (What It Do)" (feat. Slim Thug)
- "Dirty Money"
- "Hello New World"
- "Keys Open Doors"
- "Ain't Cha" (feat. Re-Up Gang)
- "Trill"
- "Chinese New Year" (feat. Roscoe)
- "Nightmares" (feat. Pharrell Williams and Bilal)

=== Gwen Stefani - The Sweet Escape ===
- "Wind It Up"
- "Orange County Girl"
- "Yummy" (feat. Pharrell Williams)
- "Breakin' Up"
- "U Started It" (produced with Mark "Spike" Stent)

=== Ciara - Ciara: The Evolution ===
- "I Proceed"
- "I'm Just Me"

=== Black the Ripper - Holla Black ===
- "Quick Wheelage (Freestyle)" {Did Not Produce}

=== Kenna - Make Sure They See My Face ===
- "Out of Control (State of Emotion)"

=== Omarion - 21 ===
- "Obsession"

=== Mos Def - True Magic ===
- "Murder of a Teenage Life"

== 2007 ==
=== Madonna - Non-album single ===
- "Hey You" (produced with Madonna)

=== The Hives - The Black and White Album ===
- "Well All Right!"
- "T.H.E.H.I.V.E.S."

=== Twista - Adrenaline Rush 2007 ===
- "Give It Up" (feat. Pharrell Williams)

=== Kenna - Make Sure They See My Face ===
- "Say Goodbye to Love"
- "Daylight"
- "Loose Wires/Blink Radio"
- "Sun Red Sky Blue"
- "Baptized in Blacknight"
- "Static"
- "Phantom Always" (feat. Justin Timberlake)
- "Face the Gun/Good Luck"
- "Better Wise Up"
- "Be Still"
- "Wide Awake"
- "Down"
- "Big Lights"
- "Rockaway Life" (feat. Justin Timberlake)

=== Jay-Z - American Gangster ===
- "I Know"
- "Blue Magic"

=== Tito "El Bambino" - It's My Time ===
- "Booty"

=== Britney Spears - Blackout ===
- "Why Should I Be Sad"

=== DJ Drama - Gangsta Grillz: The Album ===
- "Cheers" (feat. Pharrell Williams and Clipse) {Did Not Produce}

=== Mario - Go ===
- "Go"

=== Mary J. Blige - Growing Pains ===
- "Till the Morning"

== 2008 ==
=== Snoop Dogg - Ego Trippin' ===
- "Set Up" (feat. Pharrell Williams)

=== Madonna - Hard Candy ===
- "Candy Shop" (produced with Madonna)
- "Give It 2 Me" (produced with Madonna)
- "Heartbeat" (produced with Madonna)
- "She's Not Me" (produced with Madonna)
- "Incredible" (produced with Madonna)
- "Beat Goes On" (feat. Kanye West) (produced with Madonna)
- "Spanish Lesson" (produced with Madonna)
- "Ring My Bell" (produced with Madonna)

=== Solange - Sol-Angel & the St. Dreams ===
- "I Decided"

=== Common - Universal Mind Control ===
- "Universal Mind Control" (feat. Pharrell Williams)
- "Announcement" (feat. Pharrell Williams)
- "Punch Drunk Love (The Eye)" (feat. Kanye West)
- "Sex 4 Suga"
- "Gladiator" (feat. Pharrell Williams)
- "Inhale"
- "What a World" (feat. Chester French)

=== Sean Garrett - Turbo 919 ===
- "Patron" (feat. Pharrell Williams) (produced with Sean Garrett)

=== Nelly - Brass Knuckles ===
- "Let It Go Lil' Mama" (feat. Pharrell Williams)

=== John Legend - Evolver ===
- "It's Over" (feat. Kanye West) {Did Not Produce}

=== Fall Out Boy - Folie à Deux ===
- "w.a.m.s." {Did Not Produce}

== 2009 ==
=== Teriyaki Boyz - Serious Japanese ===
- "Zock On!" (feat. Pharrell Williams and Busta Rhymes)
- "Work That!" (feat. Pharrell Williams and Chris Brown)

=== Various Artists - Fast & Furious OST ===
- "Blanco" (feat. Pharrell Williams) -- Pitbull
- "G-Stro" -- Busta Rhymes
- "Loose Wires" -- Kenna
- "You Slip, She Grip" (with Tego Calderón) -- Pitbull
- "Head Bust" (feat. Pharrell Williams) -- Shark City Click
- "Bad Girls" (with Robin Thicke) -- Pitbull

=== Jadakiss - The Last Kiss ===
- "Stress Ya" (feat. Pharrell Williams)
- "Rockin' with the Best" (feat. Pharrell Williams and Bobby V)

=== Busta Rhymes - Back on My B.S. ===
- "Kill Dem" (feat. Pharrell Williams and Tosh)

=== Jay-Z - The Blueprint 3 ===
- "So Ambitious" (feat. Pharrell Williams)

=== Shakira - She Wolf ===
- "Did It Again" (solo or feat. Kid Cudi) (produced with Shakira)
- "Long Time" (produced with Shakira)
- "Why Wait" (produced with Shakira)
- "Good Stuff" (produced with Shakira)
- "Lo Hecho Está Hecho" (produced with Shakira)
- "Años Luz" (produced with Shakira)

=== Stromae - Mixture Elecstro ===
- "Je Cours" (with DJ Psar) (produced with Stromae)

=== Wale - Attention Deficit ===
- "Let It Loose" (feat. Pharrell Williams)

=== Snoop Dogg - Malice n Wonderland ===
- "Special" (feat. Pharrell Williams and Brandy)

=== Clipse - Til the Casket Drops ===
- "I'm Good" (feat. Pharrell Williams)
- "Showing Out" (feat. Pharrell Williams and Yo Gotti)
- "Popular Demoand (Popeyes)" (feat. Pharrell and Cam'ron)
- "Door Man"
- "All Eyes on Me" (feat. Keri Hilson)
- "Counseling" (feat. Pharrell Williams and Nicole Hurst)
- "Champion" (feat. Graph Nobel)
- "Life Change" (feat. Kenna)

== 2010 ==
=== Ludacris - Battle of the Sexes ===
- "Sexting"

=== Asher Roth - SFGWQAC ===
- "Public Garden"

=== Reflection Eternal - Revolutions per Minute ===
- "Ballad of the Black Gold" {Did Not Produce}

=== Uffie - Sex Dreams & Denim Jeans ===
- "ADD SUV" (feat. Pharrell Williams) {Did Not Produce}

=== Various Artists - Despicable Me OST ===
- "I'm n a Roll" -- Destinee & Paris
- "Minion Mambo" (feat. Pharrell Williams and Lupe Fiasco) -- The Minions
- "My Life" -- Robin Thicke
- "The Unicorn Song" -- Elsie Fisher

=== SHM - Until One ===
- "One (Your Name)" (feat. Pharrell Williams) {Did Not Produce}

=== Chiddy Bang - The Preview EP ===
- "The Good Life" (produced with Noah Breakfast)

=== Gucci Mane - Georgia's Most Wanted ===
- "Haterade" (feat. Pharrell Williams and Nicki Minaj)

=== T.I. - No Mercy ===
- "Get Back Up" (feat. Chris Brown)
- "Amazing" (feat. Pharrell Williams)

=== Buddy - Non-album single ===
- "Awesome"

== 2011 ==
=== Tune Day - Tune Force ===
- "Interlude" (produced with Tune Day)

=== Travis Barker - Give the Drummer Some ===
- "If You Want To" (feat. Pharrell Williams and Lupe Fiasco) (produced with Travis Barker)

=== Big Sean - Finally Famous ===
- "Get It (DT)"

=== The Cool Kids - When Fish Ride Bicycles ===
- "Get Right"
- "Summer Jam" (feat. Maxine Ashley)

=== Jay-Z & Kanye West - Watch the Throne ===
- "Lift Off" (feat. Beyoncé) (produced with Kanye West, Mike Dean, Jeff Bhasker, Q-Tip and Don Jazzy)
- "Gotta Have It" (produced with Kanye West)

=== Pusha T - Fear of God II: Let Us Pray ===
- "Trouble on My Mind" (feat. Tyler, the Creator)
- "Raid" (feat. 50 Cent and Pharrell Williams)

=== The Game - The R.E.D. Album ===
- "Mama Knows" (feat. Nelly Furtado)

=== The-Dream - 1977 ===
- "Real" (feat. Pharrell Williams) {Did Not Produce}

=== Mark Ronson - Record Collection ===
- "Record Collection 2012" (with Business Intl.) {Did Not Produce}

=== Gloria Estefan - Miss Little Havana ===
- "Miss Little Havana" (produced with Gloria Estefan)
- "I Can't Believe" (produced with Gloria Estefan)
- "Heat" (produced with Gloria Estefan)
- "Wepa" (produced with Gloria Estefan)
- "Say Ay" (produced with Gloria Estefan)
- "So Good" (produced with Gloria Estefan)
- "Right Away" (produced with Gloria Estefan)
- "Make Me Say Yes" (produced with Gloria Estefan)
- "Time is Ticking" (produced with Gloria Estefan)
- "Conga 25" (produced with Gloria Estefan)

=== T.I. - Non-album single ===
- "Hear Ye, Hear Ye" (feat. Pharrell Williams)

=== Javier Colon - Come Through for You ===
- "Stand Up" (feat. Adam Levine) (produced with Martin Terefe)

== 2012 ==
=== Cris Cab - Echo Boom EP ===
- "Echo Boom" (feat. Pharrell Williams) {Did Not Produce}
- "What Can We Do (Here We Go Again)" (feat. Daytona) {Did Not Produce}
- "One Thing" {Did Not Produce}

=== Cris Cab - Rise EP ===
- "Good Girls (Don't Grow on Trees)" (feat. Big Sean)

=== Tyga - Rise of the Last King ===
- "Lil' Homie" (feat. Pharrell Williams)

=== Yuna - Yuna ===
- "Live Your Life"
- "Bad Idea"
- "See You Go"

=== Leah LaBelle - Leah LaBelle ===
- "Sexify"

=== Rye Rye - Go! Pop! Bang! ===
- "Shake Twist Drop" (feat. Tyga)

=== Adam Lambert - Trespassing ===
- "Trespassing"
- "Kickin' In"

=== Scissor Sisters - Magic Hour ===
- "Inevitable" (produced with Scissor Sisters)

=== Currensy - The Stoned Immaculate ===
- "Chasin' Paper" (feat. Pharrell Williams)

=== Usher - Looking 4 Myself ===
- "Twisted" (feat. Pharrell Williams)
- "Hot Thing" (feat. ASAP Rocky)

=== Frank Ocean - Channel Orange ===
- "Sweet Life" (produced with Frank Ocean)
- "Golden Girl" (feat. Tyler, the Creator) (produced with Frank Ocean)

=== Conor Maynard - Contrast ===
- "Lift Off" (feat. Pharrell Williams)
- "Glass Girl"

=== Rick Ross - God Forgives, I Don't ===
- "Presidential" (feat. Elijah Blake)

=== Rick Ross - The Black Bar Mitzvah ===
- "Presidential (Remix)" (feat. Pharrell Williams and Rockie Fresh)

=== Mika - The Origin of Love ===
- "Celebrate" (feat. Pharrell Williams) {Did Not Produce}
- "Tah Dah" {Did Not Produce}

=== Kendrick Lamar - Good Kid, M.A.A.D City ===
- "Good Kid"

=== Reese - Reese Vs. The World II ===
- "Dope Dealer" (feat. Buddy) (produced with CP Dubb)

=== Wiz Khalifa - O.N.I.F.C. ===
- "Rise Above" (feat. Pharrell, Tuki Carter and Amber Rose)

=== T.I. - Heavy is the Head ===
- "Hello" (feat. Cee-Lo Green)

== 2013 ==
=== Destiny's Child - Love Songs ===
- "Nuclear"

=== N.O.R.E. - Student of the Game ===
- "The Problem (Lawwddd)" (feat. Pharrell Williams)

=== Robin Thicke - Blurred Lines ===
- "Blurred Lines" (feat. Pharrell Williams and T.I.)

=== Leah LaBelle - Non-album single ===
- "Lolita"

=== Daft Punk - Random Access Memories ===
- "Get Lucky" (feat. Pharrell Williams)
- "Lose Yourself to Dance" (feat. Pharrell Williams)

=== 2 Chainz - B.O.A.T.S. II: Me Time ===
- "Feds Watching" (feat. Pharrell Williams)

=== Kelly Rowland - Talk a Good Game ===
- "Street Life" (feat. Pusha T)
- "Stand in Front of Me"
- "Feet to the Fire" (feat. Pharrell Williams)

=== Busta Rhymes - Non-album single ===
- "Twerk It" (feat. Nicki Minaj)

=== Mac Miller - WMWSO ===
- "Objects in the Mirror"

=== Cee-Lo Green - Despicable Me 2 OST ===
- "Scream"

=== Jay-Z - Magna Carta Holy Grail ===
- "Oceans" (feat. Frank Ocean) (produced with Timbaland)
- "BBC" (feat. Nas, Timbaland, Pharrell Williams, Swizz Beatz, Justin Timberlake, Nigo, Beyoncé)

=== Mayer Hawthorne - Where Does This Door Go ===
- "Wine Glass Women"
- "Reach Out Richard"
- "The Stars Are Ours"

=== Azealia Banks - Non-album single ===
- "ATM Jam" (feat. Pharrell Williams)

=== RDGLDGRN - Red Gold Green LP 2 ===
- "Doing the Most" (produced with Dave Grohl, RDGLDGRN and Kevin Algunas)

=== John Legend - Love in the Future ===
- "Aim High" (produced with John Legend)

=== Daley - Days + Nights ===
- "Look Up"

=== Cris Cab - Where I Belong ===
- "Liar Liar" (produced with Dallas Austin)

=== Nelly - M.O. ===
- "Get Like Me" (feat. Pharrell Williams and Nicki Minaj)
- "Rick James" (feat. T.I.)
- "Maryland, Massachusetts"
- "IDGAF" (feat. Pharrell Williams and T.I.)
- "Shake Whatever"

=== Miley Cyrus - Bangerz ===
- "4x4" (feat. Nelly)
- "#GETITRIGHT"
- "Rooting for My Baby"
- "On My Own"

=== Pusha T - My Name Is My Name ===
- "Suicide" (feat. Ab-Liva)
- "S.N.I.T.C.H." (feat. Pharrell Williams)

=== Aloe Blacc - Wake Me Up EP ===
- "Love Is the Answer"

=== Beyoncé - Beyoncé ===
- "Blow" (produced with Beyoncé, Timbaland and J-Roc)
- "Superpower" (feat. Frank Ocean) (produced with Boots)

== 2014 ==
=== Maxine Ashley - Moodswings EP ===
- "Perpetual Nights" {Did Not Produce}

=== Future - Honest ===
- "Move That Dope" (feat. Pharrell Williams, Pusha T and Casino) {Did Not Produce}

=== Major Lazer - Apocalypse Soon EP ===
- "Aerosol Can" (feat. Pharrell Williams) {Did Not Produce}

=== Paloma Faith - A Perfect Contradiction ===
- "Can't Rely on You"

=== Schoolboy Q - Oxymoron ===
- "Los Awesome" (feat. Jay Rock)

=== Kap G - Like a Mexican ===
- "Cocaina Shawty" (feat. Fabolous)

=== Kylie Minogue - Kiss Me Once ===
- "I Was Gonna Cancel" (produced with Kelly Sheehan)

=== Various Artists - The Amazing Spider-Man 2 ===
- "It's On Again" (feat. Kendrick Lamar) -- Alicia Keys
- "That's My Man" -- Liz
- "Here" -- Pharrell Williams
- "Within the Web (First Day Jam)" -- Czarina Russell

=== Ed Sheeran - X ===
- "Sing"
- "Runaway"

=== Bia - #CholaSeason ===
- "Chain Swang" (feat. Pharrell Williams and Fam-Lay)
- "Around the World (Snippet)"
- "Medusa (Snippet)"
- "No Apology"
- "Spend It (Snippet)"

=== Mary J. Blige - Think Like a Man Too OST ===
- "See That Boy Again" (feat. Pharrell Williams)

=== Usher - Hard II Love ===
- "She Came to Give It to You" (feat. Nicki Minaj)

=== Jennifer Hudson - JHUD ===
- "I Can't Describe (The Way I Feel)" (feat. T.I.)
- "He Ain't Goin' Nowhere" (feat. Iggy Azalea)
- "Just That Type of Girl"
- "Never Give it Up"

=== Maxine Ashley - Non-album single ===
- "Guerrilla"

=== T.I. - Paperwork ===
- "G Shit" (feat. Jeezy and Watch the Duck)
- "Oh Yeah" (feat. Pharrell Williams)
- "Paperwork" (feat. Pharrell Williams)
- "Light Em Up" (feat. Pharrell Williams and Watch the Duck)

=== Gwen Stefani - Non-album single ===
- "Spark the Fire"

== 2015 ==
=== Kendrick Lamar - To Pimp a Butterfly ===
- "Alright" (produced with Sounwave)

=== Lion Babe - Begin ===
- "Wonder Woman" (produced with Astro Raw)

=== Gwen Stefani - Paddington (soundtrack) ===
- "Shine" (feat. Pharrell Williams)

=== Tyler, the Creator - Cherry Bomb ===
- "Keep Da O's" (feat. Pharrell Williams and Coco O) {Did Not Produce}

=== Snoop Dogg - Bush ===
- "So Many Pros"
- "California Roll" (feat. Stevie Wonder)
- "Ths City"
- "R U A Freak"
- "Awake"
- "Peaches N Cream" (feat. Charlie Wilson)
- "Edibles" (feat. T.I.)
- "I Knew That"
- "Run Away" (feat. Gwen Stefani)
- "I'm Ya Dogg" (feat. Kendrick Lamar and Rick Ross)

=== Jamie Foxx - A Story of a Dozen Roses ===
- "Tease" (feat. Pharrell Williams)

=== Koryn Hawthorne - Non-album single ===
- "Bright Fire"

=== Mia Z - Non-album single ===
- "Child"

=== Overdoz - 2008 ===
- "Last Kiss" (feat. Pharrell Williams)

=== Puff Daddy - Non-album single ===
- "Finna Get Loose" (feat. Pharrell Williams)

=== Travis Scott - Rodeo ===
- "Flying High" (feat. Toro y Moi) (produced with Travis Scott, Mike Dean and Allen Ritter)

=== Ta-ku - Songs to Make Up To ===
- "Sunrise / Beautiful" (feat. Jordan Rakei) {Did Not Produce}

=== The Weeknd - Non-album remix ===
- "Wanderlust (Pharrell Remix)"

=== Francesco Yates - Francesco Yates EP ===
- "Change the Channel" (produced with Francesco Yates)

=== WatchTheDuck - The Trojan Horse ===
- "Stretch 2-3-4" (feat. Pharrell Williams) (produced with WatchTheDuck)

=== A Tribe Called Quest - People's Instinctive Travels and the Paths of Rhythm (25th Anniversary Edition) ===
- "Bonita Applebum (Remix)"

=== Busta Rhymes - The Return of the Dragon ===
- "Tonight" (feat. Sean Paul)

=== Missy Elliott - Non-album single ===
- "WTF (Where They From)" (feat. Pharrell Williams)

== 2016 ==
=== Missy Elliott - Non-album single ===
- "Pep Rally"

=== Kanye West - The Life of Pablo ===
- "30 Hours" {Did Not Produce}

=== Kap G - El Southside ===
- "Southside"

=== Skepta - Konnichiwa ===
- "Numbers" (feat. Pharrell Williams) (produced with Skepta)

=== Sawyer Fredericks - A Good Storm ===
- "4 Pockets (Pharrell Williams Mix)"

=== Little Big Town - Wanderlust ===
- "One Dance"
- "C'mon"
- "One of Those Days"
- "Work"
- "Skinny Dippin'"
- "Willpower"
- "Miracle" (produced with Chad Hugo)
- "The Boat"

=== J Balvin - Energia ===
- "Safari" (feat. Pharrell Williams, Bia and Sky)

=== Cassius - Ibifornia ===
- "The Missing" (feat. Ryan Tedder and Jaw) {Did Not Produce}
- "Go Up" (feat. Pharrell Williams and Cat Power) {Did Not Produce}

=== Frank Ocean - Blonde ===
- "Pink + White" (produced with Frank Ocean)

=== Kirk Franklin - Non-album single ===
- "123 Victory (Remix)" (feat. Pharrell Williams)

=== Alicia Keys - Here ===
- "Work on It" (produced with Alicia Keys)

=== Various Artists - Hidden Figures OST ===
- "Mirage" -- Mary J. Blige
- "Isn't This the World" -- Janelle Monae

=== Post Malone - Stoney ===
- "Up There" (produced with Louis Bell)

=== Kid Cudi - Passion, Pain & Demon Slayin' ===
- "By Design" (feat. André Benjamin) (produced with Plain Pat)
- "Flight at First Sight/Advanced" (feat. Pharrell Williams)
- "Surfin'" (feat. Pharrell Williams)

== 2017 ==
=== Thundercat - Drunk ===
- "The Turn Down" (feat. Pharrell Williams) {Did Not Produce}

=== Calvin Harris - Funk Wav Bounces Vol. 1 ===
- "Heatstroke" (feat. Young Thug, Pharrell and Ariana Grande) (produced with Calvin Harris)
- "Feels" (feat. Pharrell Williams, Katy Perry and Big Sean) {Did Not Produce}

=== Kap G - Supa Jefe ===
- "Ay Yi Yi"
- "Icha Gicha" (feat. Pharrell Williams)

=== French Montana - Jungle Rules ===
- "Bring Dem Things" (feat. Pharrell Williams) (produced with Harry Fraud)

=== Zac Brown Band - Welcome Home ===
- "Start Over" {Did Not Produce}

=== SZA - Ctrl ===
- "Supermodel" {Did Not Produce}

=== Justine Skye - Ultraviolet ===
- "Back for More" (feat. Jeremih) {Did Not Produce}

=== Camila Cabello - Camila ===
- "Havana" (feat. Young Thug) {Did Not Produce}

=== Cara Delevingne - Valerian OST ===
- "I Feel Everything" (produced with Mike Larson)

=== Lil Uzi Vert - Luv Is Rage 2 ===
- "Neon Guts" (feat. Pharrell Williams)

=== N.O.R.E. - 5E ===
- "Uno Mas" (feat. Pharrell Williams)

=== Tamar Braxton - Bluebird of Happiness ===
- "Wanna Love You Boy" {Did Not Produce}

=== Sir Rosevelt - Sir Rosevelt ===
- "Find My Own" {Did Not Produce}

=== 2 Chainz - Pretty Girls Like Trap Music ===
- "Bailan" (feat. Pharrell Williams)

=== Ty Dolla Sign - Beach House 3 ===
- "Stare" (feat. Pharrell Williams and Wiz Khalifa)

=== Migos - Culture II ===
- "Stir Fry"

== 2018 ==
=== Justin Timberlake - Man of the Woods ===
- "Supplies" (produced with Justin Timberlake)
- "Midnight Summer Jam" (produced with Justin Timberlake)
- "Man of the Woods" (produced with Justin Timberlake)
- "Higher Higher" (produced with Justin Timberlake)
- "Wave" (produced with Justin Timberlake)
- "Flannel" (produced with Justin Timberlake)
- "Montana" (produced with Justin Timberlake)
- "Breeze Off the Pond" (produced with Justin Timberlake)
- "Livin' Off the Land" (produced with Justin Timberlake)

=== Janelle Monáe - Dirty Computer ===
- "I Got the Juice" (feat. Pharrell Williams) {Did Not Produce}

=== Camila Cabello & Pharrell Williams - Non-album single ===
- "Sangria Wine"

=== The Carters - Everything Is Love ===
- "Apeshit" (produced with Stuart White, Beyoncé and Jay-Z)
- "Nice" (produced with Beyoncé and Jay-Z)

=== Travis Scott - Astroworld ===
- "Skeletons" {Did Not Produce}

=== Ariana Grande - Sweetener ===
- "Blazed" (feat. Pharrell Williams)
- "The Light Is Coming" (feat. Nicki Minaj)
- "R.E.M."
- "Sweetener"
- "Successful"
- "Borderline" (feat. Missy Elliott)
- "Get Well Soon"

=== Leah LaBelle - Love to the Moon EP ===
- "Sun"

=== Quavo - Quavo Huncho ===
- "Go All the Way"

=== Anitta - Solo EP ===
- "Goals"

=== Mike Will Made It - Creed II: The Album ===
- "The Mantra" (feat. Pharrell Williams and Kendrick Lamar) {Did Not Produce}

== 2019 ==
=== 2 Chainz - Rap or Go to the League ===
- "Momma I Hit a Lick" (feat. Kendrick Lamar)

=== Solange - When I Get Home ===
- "Almeda" (produced with Solange and John Carroll Kirby)
- "Sound of Rain" (produced with Solange and John Key)

=== Anderson .Paak - Ventura ===
- "Twilight"

=== Madonna - Madame X ===
- "Back That Up to the Beat" (produced with Madonna, Mike Dean and Jeff Bhasker)

=== Tyler, the Creator - Igor ===
- "Are We Still Friends?" {Did Not Produce}

=== Various Artists - The Lion King OST ===
- "I Just Can't Wait to Be King" (with Shahadi Wright Joseph) -- JD McCrary
- "Hakuna Matata" (with Seth Rogen and Childish Gambino) -- Billy Eichner
- "The Lion Sleeps Tonight" (with Seth Rogen) -- Billy Eichner
- "Can You Feel the Love Tonight" (with Beyoncé) -- Childish Gambino
- "Mumbe" -- Lebo M

=== Nas - The Lost Tapes 2 ===
- "Vernon Family"

=== Pusha T - Non-album single ===
- "Sociopath" (feat. Kash Doll) (produced with Noah Goldstein and Kanye West)

=== Beck - Hyperspace ===
- "Uneventful Days" (produced with Beck)
- "Dark Places" (produced with Beck)
- "Saw Lightning" (produced with Beck)
- "Everlasting Nothing" (produced with Beck)
- "Hyperlife" (produced with Beck)
- "Chemical" (produced with Beck)
- "Hyperspace" (with Terrell Hines) (produced with Beck)

=== Kaytranada - Bubba ===
- "Midsection" (feat. Pharrell Williams) {Did Not Produce}

== 2020 ==
=== Megan Thee Stallion - Suga EP ===
- "Stop Playing" (feat. Gunna)
- "Crying in the Car"

=== Ant Clemons - Happy 2 Be Here ===
- "Aladdin" (feat. Pharrell Williams) {Did Not Produce}

=== Kehlani - It Was Good Until It Wasn't ===
- "Everybody Business" {Did Not Produce}

=== Erica Banks - Erica Banks ===
- "Buss It" (solo or feat. Travis Scott) {Did Not Produce}

=== Run the Jewels - RTJ4 ===
- "Just" (feat. Pharrell Williams and Zack de la Rocha) {Did Not Produce}

=== Doja Cat - Non-album single ===
- "Freak" {Did Not Produce}

=== Snoh Aalegra - Non-album single ===
- "Woah (Remix)" (feat. Pharrell Williams)

=== SZA - Non-album single ===
- "Hit Different" (feat. Ty Dolla Sign)

== 2021 ==
=== Ashnikko - Demidevil ===
- "Deal with It" (feat. Kelis) {Did Not Produce}

=== Robin Thicke - On Earth, and in Heaven ===
- "Take Me Higher"

=== Tyler, the Creator - Call Me If You Get Lost ===
- "Juggernaut" (feat. Pharrell Williams and Lil Uzi Vert)

== 2022 ==
=== Nigo - I Know NIGO! ===
- "Lost and Found Freestyle 2019" (produced with Nigo)
- "Punch Bowl" (produced with Nigo)
- "Functional Addict" (produced with Nigo)
- "Want It Bad" (produced with Nigo)
- "More Tonight" (produced with Nigo)
- "Paper Plates" (produced with Nigo)
- "Come On, Let's Go" (produced with Nigo and Tyler, the Creator)

=== Rosalía - Motomami ===
- "Hentai" (produced with Rosalía, Michael Uzowuru and Noah Goldstein)
- "Motomami" (produced with Rosalía and Michael Uzowuru)
- "La Combi Versace" (feat. Tokischa) (produced with Rosalía, Michael Uzowuru, Noah Goldstein, El Guincho, Sky Rompiendo and Tainy)

=== Jack Harlow - Come Home the Kids Miss You ===
- "Movie Star" (feat. Pharrell)

=== Latto - 777 ===
- "Real One"

=== Tobe Nwigwe, Pharrell & EARTHGANG - Non-album single ===
- "Lord Forgive Me"

=== Kendrick Lamar - Mr. Morale & The Big Steppers ===
- "Mr. Morale"

=== Pusha T - It's Almost Dry ===
- "Brambleton"
- "Let the Smokers Shine the Coupes" (produced with Ojivolta)
- "Neck & Wrist" (feat. JAY-Z and Pharrell Williams)
- "Rock N Roll" (feat. Kanye West and Kid Cudi) (produced with Kanye West and Ojivolta)
- "Call My Bluff"
- "Scrape It Off" (feat. Lil Uzi Vert and Don Toliver)
- "Open Air"

=== Pharrell Williams, 21 Savage & Tyler, the Creator - Non-album single ===
- "Cash In Cash Out"

=== SoFaygo - Pink Heartz ===
- "Took Off" (feat. Gunna and DJ Khaled)

=== M.I.A. - Mata ===
- "Time Traveller"

=== Pharrell Williams & Travis Scott - Non-album single ===
- "Down in Atlanta"

== 2023 ==
=== Aminé & Kaytranada - Kaytraminé ===
- "4eva" (feat. Pharrell Williams) (produced with Aminé and Kaytranada)

=== Mayer Hawthorne - Non-album single ===
- "They Don't Know You"

=== ASAP Rocky - Don't Be Dumb ===
- "Riot (Rowdy Pipe'n)" (produced with Lord Flocko and Tyler, the Creator)

=== Voices of Fire - Non-album single ===
- "JOY (Unspeakable)" (feat. Pharrell) (produced with Larry George)

=== Adekunle Gold - Tequila Ever After ===
- "Falling Up" (feat. Pharrell and Nile Rodgers)

=== Travis Scott - Utopia ===
- "Looove" (feat. Kid Cudi) (produced with Travis Scott and Buddy Ross)

=== Yella Beezy - TBD ===
- "Rich MF" (feat. Pharrell)

=== Busta Rhymes - Blockbusta ===
- "Roboshotta" (feat. Burna Boy)
- "Tings"

=== Swae Lee - TBD ===
- "Airplane Tickets" (feat. Pharrell and Rauw Alejandro)

== 2024 ==
=== Kid Cudi - Insano ===
- "At the Party" (feat. Travis Scott and Pharrell Williams)

=== Miley Cyrus - TBD ===
- "Doctor (Work It Out)" (feat. Pharrell)

Beyoncé - Cowboy Carter

- "Sweet Honey Buckiin" (feat. Shaboozey) (produced with Beyoncé)

=== Mumford & Sons - TBD ===
- "Good People" (feat. Pharrell) (produced with Mumford & Sons)

=== Pharrell Williams & Various Artists - Dullsville and the Doodleverse ===
- "Not in the Store" (Pharrell Williams & Coi Leray)
- "Can't Hold Me Down" (Pharrell Williams, Lil Wayne, Kyle Richh, Lil Yachty)
- "Draw Me Closer" (Pharrell Williams, Lil Yachty & Swae Lee)

=== Usher - Coming Home ===
- "Cold Blooded" (feat. The-Dream) (produced with The-Dream)

=== The Weeknd & Playboi Carti - Hurry Up Tomorrow ===
- "Timeless" (produced with Ojivolta and Twisco)

=== Marley Bleu - TBD ===
- "Good Mornin'" (feat. Pharrell and Doodles)

=== Rauw Alejandro - Cosa Nuestra ===
- "Committed" (feat. Pharrell)

=== Earthgang - Perfect Fantasy ===
- "U Gotta" (feat. Pharrell)

== 2025 ==
=== Don Toliver - TBD ===
- "LV Bag" (feat. Pharrell and j-hope)

=== Seventeen - Happy Burstday ===
- "Bad Influence" (produced with Mike Larson)

=== Snoop Dogg - Iz It a Crime ===
- "Spot" (feat. Pharrell and Tonio Armani)

=== Karol G - Tropicoqueta ===
- "Ivonny Bonita" (produced with Edgar Barrera and Karol G)

=== Rick Ross - TBD ===
- "For the Money" (feat. Pharrell)

=== Clipse - Let God Sort Em Out ===
- "The Birds Don't Sing" (featuring John Legend and Voices of Fire)
- "Chains & Whips" (featuring Kendrick Lamar)
- "P.O.V." (featuring Tyler, the Creator)
- "So Be It"
- "Ace Trumpets"
- "All Things Considered" (featuring The-Dream and Pharrell Williams)
- "M.T.B.T.T.F."
- "E.B.I.T.D.A." (featuring Pharrell Williams)
- "F.I.C.O." (featuring Stove God Cooks)
- "Inglorious Bastards" (featuring Ab-Liva)
- "So Far Ahead" (featuring Pharrell Williams)
- "Let God Sort Em Out/Chandeliers" (featuring Nas)
- "By the Grace of God" (featuring Pharrell Williams)

== 2026 ==
=== V8 (Seventeen) - V8 ===
- "Girlsnboys" (produced with Bumzu, The8 and Vernon)

=== Future - The Real Me ===
- "Alice"

=== Lil Baby - Fresh ===
- "Dead Fresh"

=== Quavo - Qrömelife ===
- "Backwards" (feat. T.I.)
- "BA" (feat. Future)
- "Hit-a-Lik"
- "Away" (feat. Offset)
- "Baby Breath" (feat. Pharrell, Tyler, the Creator, and ASAP Rocky)
- "Trance (Walk It Down)"
- "Factory Trim"
- "Sweep"
- "Ball My Love" (feat. Lil Baby)
- "Haoyu Dewdat" (feat. Yung Miami)
- "House Music" (feat. Justin Timberlake)
- "Thick in the Mirror"
- "Haavin"
- "Destined"

== Unreleased ==
- 2008: Lindsay Lohan – "Playground"
- 2011: Jared Evan – "Anywhere" (feat. The Game & Pharrell)
- c. 2018: Christina Aguilera – "Search the World"

== International singles and certifications ==
List of singles, with selected chart positions, showing year released and album name
Title	Year	Peak chart positions										Certifications	Album
Title	Year	US	US R&B	AUS	DEN	FRA	GER	NL	NZ	SWI	UK	Certifications	Album
"Can I Have It Like That" (Pharrell featuring Gwen Stefani)	2005	49	32	22	8	78	37	25	18	28	3		In My Mind
"Angel" (Pharrell)	2006	—	—	44	9	—	62	35	—	—	15		In My Mind
"Number One" (Pharrell featuring Kanye West)	2006	57	40	—	—	—	—	—	—	—	31		In My Mind
"That Girl" (Pharrell featuring Snoop Dogg and Charlie Wilson)	2006	—	64	—	—	—	—	—	—	—	—		In My Mind
"Ain't No Doubt About It" (The Game featuring Justin Timberlake)	2010	—	—	—	—	—	—	—	—	—	—		—N/a
"Wepa" (Gloria Estefan)	2011	—	—	—	—	—	—	—	—	—	—		Miss Little Havana
"Sexify" (Leah LaBelle)	2012	—	89	—	—	—	—	—	—	—	—		—N/a
"Sweet Life" (Frank Ocean)	2012	—	—	—	—	—	—	—	—	—	—		Channel Orange
"Trespassing" (Adam Lambert)	2012	—	—	—	—	—	—	—	—	—	—		Trespassing
"Blurred Lines" (Robin Thicke featuring T.I. and Pharrell)	2013	1	1	1	2	1	1	1	1	1	1	RIAA: Diamond; ARIA: 9× Platinum; BPI: 2× Platinum; BVMI: 2× Platinum; IFPI SWI: 3× Platinum; MC: 9× Platinum; RIANZ: 5× Platinum; SNEP: Diamond	Blurred Lines
"Lolita" (Leah LaBelle)	2013	—	—	—	—	—	—	—	—	—	—		—N/a
"Feds Watching" (2 Chainz featuring Pharrell)	2013	66	18	—	—	—	51	—	—	—	—		B.O.A.T.S. II: Me Time
"#TWERKIT" (Busta Rhymes featuring Nicki Minaj)	2013	—	54	—	—	—	—	—	—	—	—		E.L.E.2 (Extinction Level Event 2)
"Get Like Me" (Nelly featuring Nicki Minaj and Pharrell)	2013	108	36	—	—	—	—	—	—	—	19		M.O.
"#ATMJAM" (Azealia Banks featuring Pharrell Williams)	2013	—	—	—	—	—	—	—	—	—	169		—N/a
"I Can't Describe (The Way I Feel)" (Jennifer Hudson featuring T.I.)	2013	—	29	—	—	—	—	—	—	—	—		JHUD
"Look Up" (Daley)	2013	—	—	—	—	—	—	—	—	—	—		Days & Nights
"Liar Liar" (Cris Cab)	2013	—	—	—	40	5	9	9	—	8	—		Where I Belong
"Happy" (Pharrell Williams)	2013	1	1	1	1	1	1	1	1	1	1	RIAA: 6× Platinum; ARIA: 9× Platinum; BPI: 3× Platinum; BVMI: 5× Gold; IFPI DEN: 2× Platinum; IFPI SWI: Platinum; MC: 6× Platinum; RMNZ: 5× Platinum	Girl and Despicable Me 2: Original Motion Picture Soundtrack
"Can't Rely on You" (Paloma Faith)	2014	—	—	—	—	—	—	53	34	—	10	BPI: Silver	A Perfect Contradiction
"Marilyn Monroe" (Pharrell Williams)	2014	109	29	29	28	38	43	13	—	—	30	ARIA: Gold; IFPI DEN: Gold	Girl
"It's On Again" (Alicia Keys featuring Kendrick Lamar)	2014	—	40	—	—	149	39	—	—	—	31		Music from and Inspired by The Amazing Spider-Man 2
"Sing" (Ed Sheeran)	2014	13	—	1	15	11	7	7	3	15	1	RIAA: 3× Platinum; BPI: Platinum; ARIA: 2× Platinum; MC: 2× Platinum; IFPI DEN: Platinum; RMNZ: Platinum	x
"I Was Gonna Cancel" (Kylie Minogue)	2014	—	—	—	—	—	—	—	—	—	59		Kiss Me Once
"G Shit" (T.I. featuring Jeezy and Watch the Duck)	2014	—	—	—	—	—	—	—	—	—	—		Paperwork
"Spark the Fire" (Gwen Stefani)	2014	—	—	—	—	—	—	—	—	—	—		—N/a
"Peaches N Cream" (Snoop Dogg featuring Charlie Wilson)	2015	116	41	—	—	—	—	—	—	—	—		Bush
"California Roll" (Snoop Dogg featuring Stevie Wonder and Pharrell Williams)	2015	—	49	—	—	—	—	—	—	—	—		Bush
"Alright" (Kendrick Lamar)	2015	81	14	—	—	—	—	—	—	—	—	ARIA: 2× Platinum; BPI: Gold; MC: 2× Platinum; RIAA: Platinum	To Pimp a Butterfly
"Surfin'" (Kid Cudi featuring Pharrell Williams)	2016	—	—	77	—	—	—	—	—	—	—		Passion, Pain & Demon Slayin'
"OMG" (Vic Mensa featuring Pusha T)	2017	–	–	–	–	–	–	–	–	–	–		The Autobiography
"I Feel Everything" (Cara Delevingne)	2017	–	–	–	–	–	–	–	–	–	–		Valerian and the City of a Thousand Planets
"Lemon" (N.E.R.D. and Rihanna)	2017	36	16	44	47	–	–	–	–	59	31	ARIA: Platinum; BPI: Gold; MC: 2× Platinum; RIAA: 3× Platinum; ZPAV: Gold	No One Ever Really Dies
"1000" (N.E.R.D. and Future)	2017	—	—	—	—	—	—	—	—	—	—		No One Ever Really Dies
"Don't Don't Do It" (N.E.R.D. and Kendrick Lamar)	2018	—	—	—	—	—	—	—	—	—	—		No One Ever Really Dies
"Sangria Wine" (Pharrell Williams and Camila Cabello)	2018	83	—	—	–	–	–	–	–	92	84		Non-album single
"Stir Fry" (Migos)	2018	8	4	–	–	–	–	–	–	–	–	ARIA: Gold; MC: Platinum; RMNZ: Gold; RIAA: 5× Platinum	Culture 2
"Uno Mas" (N.O.R.E. featuring Pharrell Williams)	2018	—	—	—	—	—	—	—	—	—	—		5E
"Apeshit" (The Carters)	2018	13	–	51	–	23	–	25	18	56	33	MC: Platinum; SNEP: Gold; ZPAV: Gold; BPI: Silver; RIAA: Platinum	Everything Is Love
"Saw Lightning" (Beck)	2019	—	—	—	—	—	—	—	—	—	—		Hyperspace
"Uneventful Days" (Beck)	2019	—	—	—	—	—	—	—	—	—	—		Hyperspace
"Dark Places" (Beck)	2019	—	—	—	—	—	—	—	—	—	—		Hyperspace
"Everlasting Nothing" (Beck)	2019	—	—	—	—	—	—	—	—	—	—		Hyperspace
"Take Me Higher" (Robin Thicke)	2021	—	—	—	—	—	—	—	—	—	—		On Earth, and in Heaven
"Neck & Wrist" (Pusha T featuring Jay-Z and Pharrell Williams)	2022	76	23	—	—	—	—	—	—	—	—		It's Almost Dry
"Scrape It Off" (Pusha T featuring Don Toliver and Lil Uzi Vert)	2022	59	17	—	—	—	—	—	7	—	—		It's Almost Dry
"Cash In Cash Out" (Pharrell Williams featuring Tyler, the Creator and 21 Savage)	2022	26	5	62	—	—	—	—	5	—	73	RIAA: Platinum	TBA
"At the Party" (Kid Cudi featuring Pharrell Williams and Travis Scott)	2023	—	47	—	—	—	—	—	16	—	—		Insano
"Airplane Tickets" (Pharrell Williams, Rauw Alejandro and Swae Lee)	2023	—	—	—	—	—	—	—	—	—	—		TBA
"4EVA" (Aminé and Kaytranada)	2023	—	—	—	—	—	—	—	—	—	—		Kaytraminé
"Good People" (Mumford & Sons and Pharrell Williams)	2024	—	—	—	—	—	—	—	—	—	—		TBA
"Doctor (Work It Out)" (Pharrell Williams and Miley Cyrus)	2024	74	—	—	—	—	—	—	5	61	46		TBA
"Double Life" (Pharrell Williams)	2024	89	—	—	—	—	—	—	—	—	56		Non-album single
"Not In the Store" (Doodles, Coi Leray and Pharrell Williams featuring Lil Uzi Vert)	2024	—	—	—	—	—	—	—	—	—	—		Dullsville and the Doodleverse
"Can't Hold Me Down" (Lil Wayne, Lil Yachty and Pharrell Williams featuring Kyle Richh and Doodles)	2024	—	—	—	—	—	—	—	—	—	—		Dullsville and the Doodleverse
"Timeless" (The Weeknd and Playboi Carti)	2024	3	1	11	10	46	8	24	4	2	7		Hurry Up Tomorrow
"—" denotes a recording that did not chart or was not released in that territory.

== See also ==
- Pharrell Williams discography
- The Neptunes production discography
