= Sweetener (song) =

2018 song by Ariana Grande

Song by Ariana Grande

from the album Sweetener
- Released: August 17, 2018
- Studio: Chalice (Hollywood); EastWest (Hollywood); Conway (Hollywood); Glenwood Place Studios (Burbank); The Lunchtable (Los Angeles)
- Genre: Hip hop; soul; bubblegum-rap
- Length: 3:28
- Songwriters: Pharrell Williams; Ariana Grande
- Producer: Pharrell Williams

"Sweetener" is a song by American singer Ariana Grande from her fourth studio album of the same name, released in 2018. The song was written alongside producer Pharrell Williams.

== Background and release ==
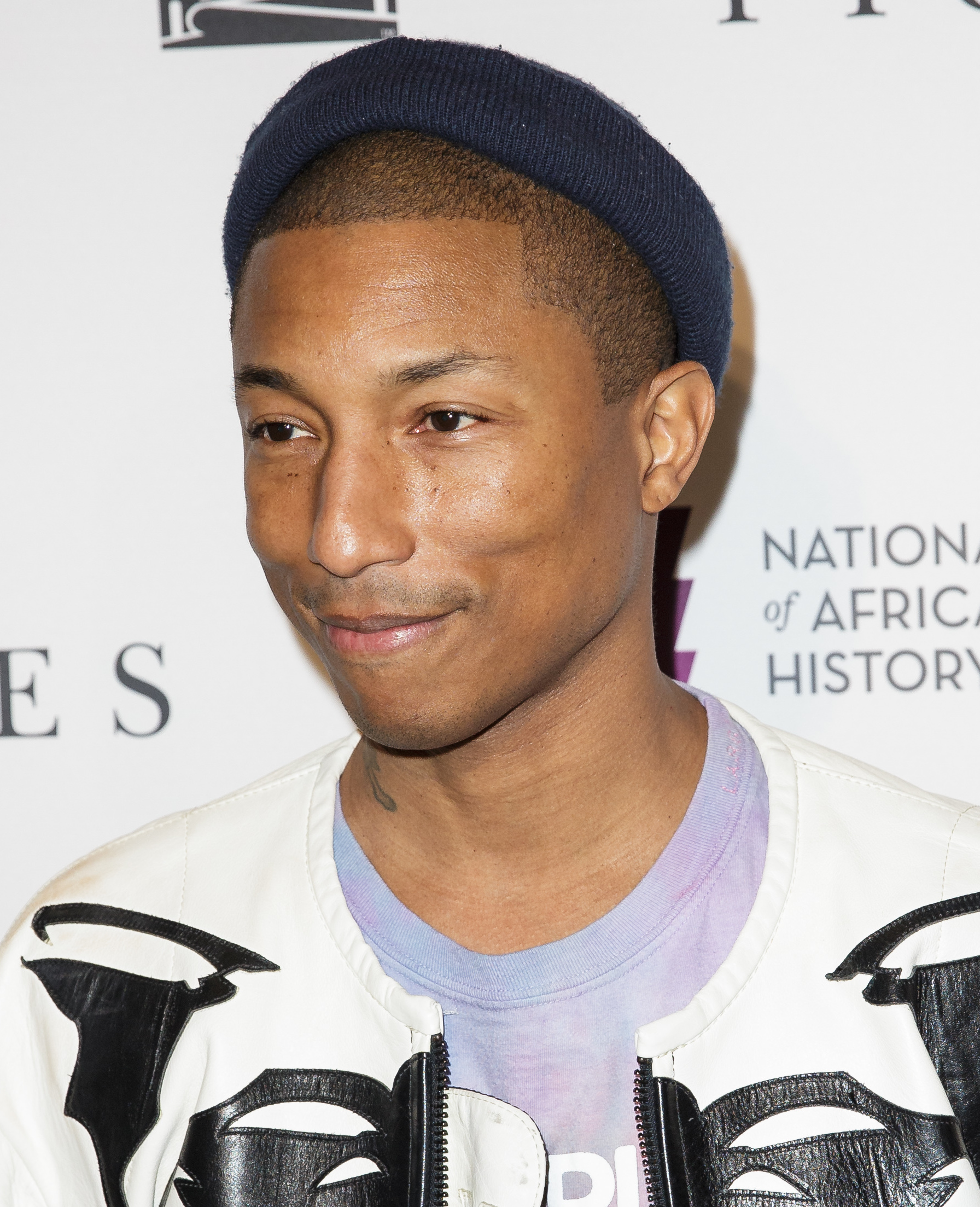
Pharrell Williams (pictured in 2016) co-wrote and produced the track.

It was written by Ariana Grande and Pharrell Williams who also handled the production. Grande's vocals were recorded by Sam Holland and Noah Passovoy at MXM Studios in Los Angeles, California, with Jeremy Lertola providing recording engineer assistance. Phill Tan mixed the track, and Josh Cadwin was the audio engineer, with Andrew Coleman and Mark Larson as the recording engineer. Randy Merrill later mastered the song at Sterling Sound in New York City, New York.

The song was first teased in Grande's "No Tears Left to Cry" music video, along with other songs. Grande posted a picture of herself listening to the song on her instagram story. On July 21, 2018, a paparazzo leaked a snippet of Grande playing the song in her car, and later that day Grande confirmed the snippet on her Twitter.

== Composition and lyrics ==
"Sweetener"
A 20-second sample of the song.

"Sweetener" runs for a total duration of three minutes and twenty-eight seconds (3:28). The song was one of the first Grande wrote for Sweetener. Musically, the song is a hip hop, soul, and bubblegum-rap song. Lyrically, the song talks about self care and empowerment while she sings directly for her lover. There are double entendres in the song as well. According to the sheet music published at Musicnotes.com by Universal Music Publishing Group, the song is composed in the key of E Major with a tempo of 120 beats per minute. Grande's vocals range from the note of F♯_{3} to D_{5}.

The New York Times's Jon Pareles wrote, "The sacred-secular juxtapositions continue in the title song, a Pharrell Williams production that switches between gospelly piano chords — as Ms. Grande praises how her man can 'bring the bitter taste to a halt' — and more dissonant hip-hop as she enjoys how 'you make me say 'oh!''." Taylor Weatherby of Billboard called the song "'90s-inspired". The Guardian's Alexis Petridis said, "the title track offers a bizarre, gripping splice of earthy Carole King-ish singer-songwriter piano ballad with Migos-inspired hip-hop, complete with onomatopoeic vocal interjections". Spencer Kornhaber of The Atlantic said the song "gutsily blends the sensibilities of commencement speeches with that of Lil Pump".

It has been noted by numerous online sources that the melody of the song is, consciously or unconsciously, directly inspired by the Bryan Adams' song Christmas Time (Bryan Adams song), as well as harmonically by the Bee Gees hit How Deep Is Your Love (Bee Gees song).

== Critical reception ==
"Sweetener" received positive reception from music critics. Brittany Spanos of Rolling Stone called the song a "bouncy, almost wickedly catchy highlight" on the album. In his review of the album, NME's Douglas Greenwood wrote, "There's a telling audacity to the title track. Arriving midway through the album, 'Sweetener' sees Grande sing effervescently about 'letting the sweetener in our hearts' to 'bring that bitterness to a halt', before she ushers in a trap breakdown thats sounds like Metro Boomin messing with The Little Mermaid soundtrack." Chris DeVille of Stereogum said, "The title track is the sort of modernized throwback soul tune Meghan Trainor might release, but rendered tastefully and produced with the detail-rich minimalism of Spoon's Kill the Moonlight."

Pitchfork ranked it on its 100 best songs of 2018 list, saying that "amid the track's svelte production — trickling percussion, cushy bass hits, a lusty and cascading synth line — Pharrell punctuates Grande's commands with a high-pitched 'sheesh!' like a steam whistle cutting through the air. It all adds up to a gleeful evocation of sensuality on an album consumed with the heady pleasures of new love. 'Sweetener' carries a tender streak, too, embracing the notion of finding the good in so much bad, and toasting to the people in one's life who encourage such perseverance. It embodies that same look-on-the-bright-side universality — a reminder that even the worst feelings can be turned into something radiant and nourishing."

== Commercial performance ==
The song debuted on September 1, 2018 at number 55 at its peak position, being Grande's second highest-charting non-single in the US. After "Breathin" was released as the third single off Sweetener, it became Grande's highest-charting non-single in the US, later beaten by "Needy".

== Live performances ==
Grande debuted the song live at The Sweetener Sessions in 2018. The song was later performed during the Sweetener World Tour in 2019.

== Credits and personnel ==
Credits and personnel are adapted from the liner notes of Sweetener.

Recording

- Recorded at Chalice Recording Studios (Hollywood, California), East West Studios (Hollywood, California), Glenwood Place Studios (Burbank, California), The Lunchtable (Los Angeles, California) and Conway Recording Studios (Los Angeles, California)
- Mixed at Callanwolde Fine Arts Center (Atlanta, Georgia)
- Mastered at Sterling Sound (New York City, New York)

Management

- Published by EMI Pop Music Publishing/More Water from Nazareth (GMR), Universal Music Corp./GrandAri Music (ASCAP)

Personnel

- Ariana Grande – songwriting, vocals, vocal arrangement
- Pharrell Williams – songwriting, production, additional vocals
- Andrew Coleman – recording, digital editing and arrangement for I Am Other Entertainment
- Mike Larson – recording, digital editing and arrangement for I Am Other Entertainment
- Thomas Cullison – recording assistant
- David Kim – recording assistant
- Chris Khan – recording assistant
- Jacob Dennis – recording assistant
- Ian Findlay – recording assistant
- Ben "Bengineer" Sedano – recording assistant
- Phil Tan – mixing
- Bill Zimmerman – additional mix engineering
- Randy Merrill – mastering

== Charts ==
Chart performance for "Sweetener"
Chart (2018)	Peak position
Australia (ARIA)	43
Canada Hot 100 (Billboard)	44
France (SNEP)	183
Hungary (Single Top 40)	20
Ireland (IRMA)	15
Netherlands (Single Top 100)	77
New Zealand (Recorded Music NZ)	40
Portugal (AFP)	57
Scotland Singles (Official Charts)	61
Sweden (Sverigetopplistan)	96
UK Singles (Official Charts)	22
US Billboard Hot 100	55

== Certifications ==
Certifications for "Sweetener"
Region	Certification	Certified units/sales
Australia (ARIA)	Gold	35,000^{‡}
Brazil (Pro-Música Brasil)	Platinum	40,000^{‡}
Canada (Music Canada)	Platinum	80,000^{‡}
New Zealand (RMNZ)	Gold	15,000^{‡}
United Kingdom (BPI)	Silver	200,000^{‡}
United States (RIAA)	Platinum	1,000,000^{‡}
^{‡} Sales+streaming figures based on certification alone.

== See also ==
- Pharrell Williams production discography
