= Terrell Hines =

American rapper

- Origin: Dublin, Georgia
- Genres: Hip hop; alternative; pop; soul
- Occupations: Creative Entrepreneur; Rapper; songwriter; multi-instrumentalist
- Years active: 2019–present
- Label: Capitol Records
- Website: https://terrellhines.com

Terrell Dewayne Hines (born August 5, 1995) is a creative entrepreneur and musician from Dublin, Georgia.

He is best known for his 2020 song, titled 'On Fire'. It was featured on Madden NFL 21's soundtrack and was used for the game's intro.

== Background ==
Hines released his debut EP, St. Mark Road, on October 11, 2019. He is featured on the title track of the Beck album Hyperspace, which was released a month later.

In July 2020 he released a remix of his song "Get Up" with Vince Staples, which originally appeared on St. Mark Road. The remix includes updated lyrics inspired from the 2020 Black Lives Matter protests. This version of the song appears on Hines's debut album, Portal One: The Mixtape. In October 2020, he released the single "We're All Gonna Be Killed".

He is influenced from a variety of artists that have had an impact on him and tend to "do their own thing", such as Andre 3000, Joy Division, Kendrick Lamar, Kanye West, and Tom Waits.

== Discography ==
=== Mixtapes ===
- Portal One: The Mixtape (2020)

=== EP's ===
- St. Mark Road (2019)

=== Singles ===
Title	Released	Album
"Get Up" (solo)	October 11, 2019	St. Mark Road
"Get Up" (feat. Vince Staples)	July 6, 2020	Portal One: The Mixtape
"On Fire"	August 7th, 2020	Portal One: The Mixtape
"We're All Gonna Be Killed"	October 23, 2020	Non-album singles
"Who Do You Love?"	April 26, 2021	Non-album singles
"Radon Dungeon"	June 18, 2021	Non-album singles
"Otherside"	November 19, 2021	Non-album singles
"We Are Alive"	February 25, 2022	Non-album singles
"Haint Blue"	October 28, 2022	Non-album singles
"Fluorescent Rooms"	May 26, 2023	Non-album singles
"Rome Has Fallen"	June 30, 2023	Non-album singles
"Save Yourself"	September 18, 2023	Non-album singles
"Take 9"	December 19, 2023	Non-album singles
"Concrete Hearts"	February 20, 2025	Non-album singles

==== As featured artist ====
Title	Released	Album
"Hyperspace" (with Beck)	November 22, 2019	Hyperspace
"ultraviolet.tragedies" (with X Ambassadors)	January 15, 2021	(Eg)
