= Paisley Park Sessions =

EP by Beck
- Released: November 11, 2019
- Studios: Paisley Park, Chanhassen
- Length: 12:50
- Label: Capitol
- Producer: Beck Hansen

Beck chronology
Colors (2017)	Paisley Park Sessions (2019)	Hyperspace (2019)

Paisley Park Sessions is the third EP released by alternative rock musician Beck. It was released exclusively through Amazon Music on November 11, 2019, with a short promotional video called "Behind the Paisley Park Sessions". The EP was recorded at Prince's Studio A at Paisley Park Studios and was the first thing recorded at the studio since his death in 2016. On November 18, 2019, music videos were released for all three songs.

== Background ==
In the "Behind the Paisley Park Sessions" video, Beck stated that when he had first heard the name "Paisley Park" as a child he had imagined what it looked like. In early 2019, Beck received an invitation to record in Paisley Park Studios with Beck accepting, marking the first time since 2016 that anyone used Paisley Park Studios. Beck also went on to state that during the recording that he had no real expectations or ideas going in and just went "wherever it took us". Beck has also said in an Instagram post that this album was "a nearly impromptu jam recorded on hallowed ground."

== Content ==
The album features remixes of the previously released singles "Where It's At" and "Up All Night". The final song, "The Paisley Experience", is a medley of Prince songs, including "Raspberry Beret", "1999", "When Doves Cry", and "Kiss". The reason he chose to make a medley of Prince songs is because he believed it was impossible to just pick one.

== Track listing ==
Paisley Park Sessions track listing
No.	Title	Writer(s)	Length
1.	"Where It's At"	Beck; The Dust Brothers	4:20
2.	"Up All Night"	Beck; Greg Kurstin	3:04
3.	"The Paisley Experience"	Prince	5:24
Total length:			12:50
