= Defriended =

Single by Beck
- B-side: "Defriended" (Extended Mix)
- Released: June 24, 2013
- Recorded: 2008–2012
- Studio: Ocean Way Recording, United Western Recorders (Hollywood, California); The Library (Minneapolis, Minnesota)
- Length: 3:46
- Label: Fonograf
- Songwriter: Beck Hansen

Beck singles chronology
"I Just Started Hating Some People Today" (2012)	"Defriended" (2013)	"I Won't Be Long" (2013)

"Defriended" is a song by the American alternative rock singer Beck, released June 24, 2013.

== Background ==
"Defriended" was first recorded in 2008 at Ocean Way Recording and United Western Recorders in Hollywood, but was completed and mixed at The Library in Minneapolis, Minnesota. The track is Beck's first released original material in five years, and the track leaked several days ahead of its release. The single was released digitally alongside a 12" vinyl release, with 14-minute extended remix on the B-side. The cover art is the painting About a Girl (2005) by Mamma Andersson. The song was independently released through Beck's record label, FONOGRAF.

== Reception ==
Jon Dolan of Rolling Stone reviewed the song positively, writing "Over south-of-the-border scraping, a fading-angel chorale and some delectable molasses-flow electro effluvia, he liquidates his soul inscrutably and beautifully. It's hard drive-rusting digital blues." Mikael Wood of the Los Angeles Times called the song "a typically expansive track that layers the singer's heavily reverbed vocals over folky acoustic guitar, rolling drums, trippy synth licks and droning, sitar-like sounds."

== Formats and track listing ==
All songs written and composed by Beck Hansen.

Digital download (2013)

1. "Defriended" – 3:46

12" (2013)

1. "Defriended" – 3:46
2. "Defriended" (Extended Mix) – 14:01

== Personnel ==
- Beck Hansen – vocals, acoustic guitar, electric guitar, organ, synthesizer, production, writer
- Jason Falkner – guitar, synthesizer
- Gus Seyffert – double bass
- Joey Waronker – drums, percussion
- Cassidy Turbin – saxophone

== Charts ==
Chart (2012)	Peak position
Mexico Ingles Airplay (Billboard)	45
