= I Just Started Hating Some People Today =

Single by Beck
- B-side: "Blue Randy"
- Released: May 28, 2012
- Recorded: 2012
- Studio: Third Man Records (Nashville, Tennessee)
- Genre: Country
- Length: 5:08
- Label: Third Man
- Songwriter: Beck Hansen

Beck singles chronology
"Looking for a Sign" (2012)	"I Just Started Hating Some People Today" (2012)	"Defriended" (2013)

"I Just Started Hating Some People Today" is a song by the American alternative rock singer Beck, released as a single on May 28, 2012.

== Background ==
"I Just Started Hating Some People Today" was first recorded in 2012 as part of the Blue Serie of Jack White's label Third Man Records in the studio of the label.

== Track listing ==
Digital download All songs written and composed by Beck Hansen.

1. "I Just Started Hating Some People Today" – 5:08
2. "Blue Randy" – 3:52

== Personnel ==
=== Musicians ===
- Beck Hansen – vocals, electric guitar, harmonica (track 1)
- Jack White – drums, electric guitar (track 1), punk vocals (track 1), background vocals (track 1)
- Dean Fertita – keyboards (track 1), acoustic guitar (track 1), bass, background vocals (track 1)
- Fats Kaplin – fiddle (track 1), pedal steel
- Karen Elson – jazz vocals (track 1)
- Randy Blau – laser tag (track 2)

=== Technical ===
- Jack White III – production
- Joshua Smith – recording
- Mindy Watts – recording assistant, producer assistant

=== Artwork ===
- Jo McCaughey – photography
- Matthew Jacobson – design

== Charts ==
Chart (2012)	Peak position
Mexico Ingles Airplay (Billboard)	47
