= Everybody's Gotta Learn Sometime (album) =

Compilation album by Beck
- Released: January 29, 2026
- Length: 30:00
- Labels: Capitol; EMI

Beck chronology
Hyperspace (2019)	Everybody's Gotta Learn Sometime (2026)	Ride Lonesome (2026)

Everybody's Gotta Learn Sometime is a compilation album by the American alternative musician Beck, released digitally on January 29, 2026, and released physically on February 13, 2026. The album contains covers of love songs by artists such as Elvis Presley and John Lennon. It is a Valentine's Day-themed compilation.

== Release and reception ==
Professional ratings
Review scores
Source	Rating
The Times	4/5 stars

Everybody's Gotta Learn Sometime was released physically on February 13, 2026. The album consists of rarities, deep cuts, and covers. It also contains one of Beck's many contributions to the Scott Pilgrim vs. the World soundtrack, "Ramona". It is Beck's second compilation after his 2000 B-sides compilation Stray Blues. Writing for The Times, Will Hodgkinson stated that "Beck's goal here seems to evoke a mood of total relaxation conducive to nights of love", he notes that "It's all a long way from the carefree goofball madness of Beck's Nineties heyday but it is also very pretty, rather dreamlike and unquestionably romantic."

== Track listing ==
No.	Title	Original artist	Length
1.	"Everybody's Gotta Learn Sometime"	The Korgis	5:52
2.	"Can't Help Falling in Love"	Elvis Presley	3:14
3.	"I Only Have Eyes for You"	Dick Powell	4:17
4.	"Ramona"	Beck	4:25
5.	"Michelangelo Antonioni"	Caetano Veloso	4:14
6.	"Your Cheatin' Heart"	Hank Williams	2:37
7.	"Love"	John Lennon	3:13
8.	"True Love Will Find You in the End"	Daniel Johnston	2:08
Total length:			30:00

== Charts ==
Chart performance for Everybody's Gotta Learn Sometime
Chart (2026)	Peak position
Belgian Albums (Ultratop Flanders)	156
Belgian Albums (Ultratop Wallonia)	172
French Physical Albums (SNEP)	119
Scottish Albums (Official Charts)	40
UK Albums Sales (OCC)	50
US Top Album Sales (Billboard)	23
