= Uneventful Days =

Single by Beck

from the album Hyperspace
- Released: October 17, 2019
- Genre: Vaporwave
- Length: 3:17
- Label: Capitol
- Songwriters: Beck, Pharrell Williams
- Producers: Beck, Pharrell Williams, David Greenbaum

Beck singles chronology
"Saw Lightning" (2019)	"Uneventful Days" (2019)	"Dark Places" (2019)

"Uneventful Days" is a song by the American musician Beck. It was released on October 17, 2019, as the second single from his fourteenth studio album Hyperspace.

== Music video ==
Dev Hynes directed the music video for "Uneventful Days". Rolling Stone described the song's music video as surreal. The music video contains references to Beck's past music videos, including "Devils Haircut" (1996) and "Sexx Laws" (1999), and stars Evan Rachel Wood, Tessa Thompson and Alia Shawkat.

== Charts ==
=== Weekly charts ===
Chart (2019–2020)	Peak position
Belgium (Ultratip Bubbling Under Flanders)	33
Japan Hot Overseas (Billboard)	16
US Adult Alternative Airplay (Billboard)	1
US Hot Rock & Alternative Songs (Billboard)	24
US Rock & Alternative Airplay (Billboard)	36

=== Year-end charts ===
Chart (2020)	Position
US Adult Alternative Songs (Billboard)	12
