= Hyperspace (album) =

Studio album by Beck
- Released: November 22, 2019
- Genres: Synth-pop; R&B; dream pop; new wave; vaporwave
- Length: 39:16
- Label: Fonograf Records/Capitol
- Producers: Pharrell Williams; Beck Hansen; Cole M.G.N.; Greg Kurstin; Paul Epworth

Beck chronology
Paisley Park Sessions (2019)	Hyperspace (2019)	Everybody's Gotta Learn Sometime (2026)

Singles from Hyperspace
- 1. "Saw Lightning" Released: April 15, 2019; 2. "Uneventful Days" Released: October 17, 2019; 3. "Dark Places" Released: November 7, 2019; 4. "Everlasting Nothing" Released: November 14, 2019

Hyperspace (stylized in Japanese as ハイパースペース (Haipāsupēsu)) is the fourteenth studio album by American musician Beck. It was released through Fonograf Records and a licensing deal with Capitol Records on November 22, 2019. It followed Beck's divorce from his wife Marissa Ribisi in February 2019. The album is a collaborative project with high-profile producer Pharrell Williams, who is credited for production and features on several songs. Recording for the album started in late 2018.

Music journalists describe the album as synth-pop and vaporwave aesthetic-inspired, though Beck draws from several genres. The album art reflects this style, featuring Beck in front of an A60 Toyota Celica, with the album's title in blocky Japanese script. Thematically, Hyperspace explores heartbreak, sincerity, solitude and Beck's relation to them. Guest vocalists for the album include Chris Martin, Sky Ferreira, Pharrell Williams, Terrell Hines, Alex Lilly and Roger Joseph Manning Jr.

Four singles were released prior to the release of Hyperspace. Following its release Beck did a series of interviews, mainly focused on the album itself, Pharrell's contribution to the record, and Beck's creative process. In August 2020 Beck released an accompanying visual album titled Hyperspace: A.I. Exploration in collaboration with NASA JPL, featuring artificial intelligence generated space imagery and two new songs.

Hyperspace received generally positive reviews from critics, though some commented that the album is occasionally superficial and lacked the complexity of Beck's previous projects. Hyperspace received two nominations at the 2021 Grammy Awards for Best Alternative Music Album and Best Engineered Album, Non-Classical. Beck won the latter.

== Background ==
After concluding the tour for Colors in September 2018, Beck "wanted to seize the moment" to collaborate with Pharrell Williams, something he had wanted to do since 2012. Only once they were in the studio did the idea of a full-length album occur, Beck revealing that their collaboration was initially "going to be a single or an EP, but I think we were both surprised when there was a body of work here".

In February 2019, during the recording on Hyperspace, Beck filed for divorce from Marissa Ribisi, his wife of 15 years, an experience he described as "heartbreaking". Critics expected to see this reflected in the album, though many noted upon release that Hyperspace lacked the somber tone of Sea Change, another album Beck released after a breakup. This detachment of Beck's personal experiences from his music was intentional, with Beck stating he believes detachment leads to better music. Pitchfork writer Sam Sodomsky agreed with this sentiment, writing "It's been a long time since he successfully integrated his personality and his music".

== Musical style ==
Musically, the album has been described as being synth-pop, R&B, dream pop, new wave, and vaporwave. Beck sought to produce a more stripped back sound on Hyperspace. He said he wanted the songs "to be simple, and let them breathe", which is a departure from his historically fuller and maximalist songs. Beck accredits this simplification to Williams, who he has described as a "master minimalist". In contrast to the upbeat and fast-paced songs on his previous album Colors, Beck says in Hyperspace "the songs are a bit slower and have a little bit more of a spell in them; more of a mood".

Thematically, Hyperspace deals with heartbreak, finding relief in troubled times, uncertainty and doubt. Beck has said the album is "about finding peace in the moment". Variety writer A.D. Amorosi described the song "Dark Places" as a "study of epic loneliness", which is complemented by the "proggy bass lines". Hyperspace rarely directly references Beck's recent divorce, but the theme of disconnection and vast loneliness is consistent throughout. The stripped back sounds of Hyperspace enhance this, the songs "Chemical" and "Dark Places" being described as "lullabies delivered from a space shuttle with just one person on it".

== Recording and production ==
Recording sessions for Hyperspace began after Beck concluded his Colors tour in September 2018. The album credits Pharrell Williams, Cole M.G.N., Greg Kurstin, Paul Epworth, David Greenbaum and Beck himself as producers. Critics primarily focus on Pharrell's influence, who co-wrote or co-produced seven tracks in the album. Beck describes Williams's influence on the album as "embrac[ing] this kind of post-digital sound".

Hyperspace is the first project that Beck and Williams have worked on, though each artist has expressed respect for the other throughout their careers. In early 2018 Williams approached Beck for help on a N.E.R.D. song, and from there they "reconnected" and started to work on Hyperspace.

== Title and packaging ==
Beck released the title Hyperspace alongside the first single "Saw Lightning" in April 2019. The title is inspired by the 1980s video game Asteroids. The 'hyperspace' button in the game allows the player to teleport out of harm's way, saving their life. Beck has stated that "each song has kind of a different way that different people hyperspace, or deal with the world", tying the title to the theme of the album.

In October 2019, a month before the album's release, Beck posted the album cover alongside the words "In hyperspace / electric life is in my brain." The cover artwork features Beck standing in front of a Toyota Celica, with the title in katakana, ハイパースペース (Haipāsupēsu). Beck, who is credited for the design concept, says he chose to have the Celica on the cover due to its humble status as "an everyday kind of car" that "lets us transcend the everyday". The inclusion of the title in Japanese on the cover was Beck's first instinct and "just felt right". Although not directly stated by Beck himself, critics pick up on the strong influence of the vaporwave aesthetic on the album's artwork. Features of vaporwave aesthetic include 1980's arcade games, vintage cars and Japanese consumer electronics all of which are prominent in the albums cover artwork. The accompanying artwork in the vinyl version of the album is similar, the inner spread showing the dashboard of the Celica with the title on the steering wheel, and the back cover showing Beck and the car from a different angle.

=== Hyperspace: A.I. Exploration ===
In August 2020 Beck released a visual component of Hyperspace in collaboration with NASA JPL called Hyperspace: A.I. Exploration. The collaboration pairs each song in the album with a set of visuals to create an "interstellar journey combining publicly available NASA mission images, curated with assistance from NASA JPL, visualizations, animations and data with revolutionary Artificial Intelligence tech." The videos are produced by OSK Studios, who specialize in creative applications of artificial intelligence.

Beck also announced a deluxe reissue of Hyperspace to accompany the collaboration. The limited edition vinyl includes two extra songs; a new version of "Dark Places" and an acoustic rendition of Chris Bell's "I Am the Cosmos". The vinyl also features new mixes of most songs, and a 24-page booklet containing the A.I. generated imagery and NASA data.

== Marketing ==
Prior to the release of the album, Beck and Capitol Records released four singles. "Saw Lightning", released April 15 was co-written by Beck and Pharrell Williams and also included vocals, drums and keyboard from Williams. Additionally the title Hyperspace was also revealed, a press release stating that the upcoming album would come out "at an as yet undetermined point in the space time continuum". The second single "Uneventful Days" was released October 17 alongside a music video directed by Dev Hynes. The single was well received, peaking at No. 1 on Billboard's US Adult Alternative Songs. On November 7 "Dark Places" was released with a lyric video made by Eddie Obrand. "Everlasting Nothing", another song featuring Williams's writing and instrumentals, was released 14 November, a week before Hyperspace's release.

Beck teased and announced the release of Hyperspace on social media in early October 2019. The album's release was accompanied by interviews with several publications. This included NME, a piece by The New Yorker and NPR. These interviews primarily focused on the collaboration on Hyperspace with Williams, and Beck's creative process.

Following the release of the album, Beck headlined the Intersect festival in December 2019 along with Kacey Musgraves, Anderson .Paak and Foo Fighters. In February 2020 Beck announced a set of UK and European tour dates, taking place in June and July. In May 2020 these tour dates were cancelled due to the COVID-19 pandemic. The performances were rescheduled for June and July 2021, however in May 2021 a statement was released on Beck's Twitter account that the shows had been cancelled "due to continued coronavirus-related restrictions on public gatherings, and in the interest of public safety". Beck was also meant to perform at several festivals in 2020, including Williams's Something in the Water festival and Netherlands festival Down the Rabbit Hole. However, all the festivals were cancelled or postponed due to safety concerns over the COVID-19 pandemic.

== Critical reception ==
Professional ratings
Aggregate scores
Source	Rating
AnyDecentMusic?	6.8/10
Metacritic	77/100
Review scores
Source	Rating
AllMusic	3.5/5 stars
Consequence of Sound	B−
Exclaim!	7/10
The Guardian	3/5 stars
The Independent	3/5 stars
NME	4/5 stars
Paste	6.7/10
Pitchfork	6.5/10
Rolling Stone	4/5 stars
Slant Magazine	2.5/5 stars

Hyperspace received mostly positive reviews from music critics. At Metacritic, which assigns a normalized rating out of 100 to reviews from mainstream critics, the album has an average score of 77 based on 19 reviews, indicating "generally favorable reviews". Aggregator AnyDecentMusic? Gave it a 6.8 out of 10, based on their assessment of critic's reviews.

Musically, Variety writer A.D. Amorosi described the album as "joyfully introspective, minimalistic but sophisticated, contagiously melodic, straight-ahead, analog synth-pop record with a fleeting few of old school Beck's signature touches". Sam Sodomsky, writing for Pitchfork, felt that "nowadays, it's less rewarding to dig for the substance beneath his aesthetics", suggesting that Hyperspace is less thematically driven than Beck's previous records. Matthew Perpetua of NPR compared the album to Beck's previous, writing "many of the songs are not far off from the glossy bops of Beck's previous album, Colors".

Rolling Stone editor David Fricke echoed the idea that Hyperspace is similar to Beck's past work, writing "Beck combines the exuberant studio mischief of 199[9]'s Midnite Vultures with the sumptuous introspection of 2002's Sea Change to eccentric, genuinely compelling effect." Other critics saw Hyperspace as a departure from Beck's previous albums, Pitchfork's Sam Sodomsky insisting that "the smooth, twilight sound of Hyperspace pushes him toward new territory".

On the collaborative nature of the album, critics mostly welcomed Williams' input. Elizabeth Aubury, writing for NME noting that "the album is at its best where Beck and Pharrell meet in the middle: when their worlds do manage to cosmically align, the songs are at their most memorable and interesting." Pitchfork writer Sam Sodomsky agreed that Williams and Beck have good chemistry on the album.

== Track listing ==
All tracks are written and produced by Beck Hansen and Pharrell Williams, except where noted.

No.	Title	Writer(s)	Producer(s)	Length
1.	"Hyperlife"			1:36
2.	"Uneventful Days"			3:17
3.	"Saw Lightning"			4:01
4.	"Die Waiting"	Hansen; Cole M.G.N.; Kossisko Konan	Hansen; Cole M.G.N.	4:04
5.	"Chemical"			4:18
6.	"See Through"	Hansen; Greg Kurstin	Kurstin; Hansen	3:38
7.	"Hyperspace" (with Terrell Hines)	Hansen; Williams; Hines		2:45
8.	"Stratosphere" (with Chris Martin)	Hansen	Hansen	3:56
9.	"Dark Places"			3:45
10.	"Star"	Hansen; Paul Epworth	Epworth; Hansen	2:50
11.	"Everlasting Nothing"			5:00
Total length:				39:16

Japanese edition bonus track
No.	Title	Length
12.	"Saw Lightning" (Freestyle)	2:19
Total length:		41:37

Hyperspace 2020
No.	Title	Writer(s)	Producer(s)	Length
1.	"Hyperlife"			1:36
2.	"Uneventful Days"			3:17
3.	"Saw Lightning"			4:01
4.	"Die Waiting" (with Sky Ferreira) (new 2020 mix)	Hansen; Cole M.G.N.; Kossisko Konan	Hansen; Cole M.G.N.	4:04
5.	"Chemical"			4:18
6.	"See Through" (new 2020 mix)	Hansen; Kurstin	Kurstin; Hansen	3:38
7.	"Hyperspace" (with Terrell Hines) (new 2020 mix)	Hansen; Williams; Hines		2:45
8.	"Stratosphere" (with Chris Martin)	Hansen	Hansen	3:56
9.	"Dark Places"			3:45
10.	"Star" (new 2020 mix)	Hansen; Epworth	Epworth; Hansen	2:50
11.	"Everlasting Nothing"			5:00
12.	"Darkplaces (Soundscape)"			1:30
13.	"I Am the Cosmos (42420)"	Chris Bell	Hansen	1:33
Total length:				42:19

Hyperspace 2020 digital deluxe bonus tracks
No.	Title	Producer(s)	Length
14.	"Uneventful Days" (St. Vincent remix)	Williams; Hansen; St. Vincent	2:59
15.	"Saw Lightning" (Freestyle)		2:19
Total length:			47:37

Hyperspace 2020 Japanese deluxe edition bonus tracks
No.	Title	Length
16.	"Where It's At" (Paisley Park version)
17.	"Up All Night" (Paisley Park version)
18.	"The Paisley Experience"

== Personnel ==
Adapted from the album's liner notes.

Musicians

- Beck Hansen – vocals (all tracks), keyboards (1, 8, 10), guitar (4, 8, 9, 11), slide guitar (3), piano (3, 11), harmonica (3), bass (10)
- Pharrell Williams – keyboards (1–3, 5, 9, 11), drums (2, 3, 5, 9, 11), mumbles (3)
- Roger Manning Jr. – keyboards (1, 8), background vocals (4–6, 8, 9, 11)
- Cole M.G.N. – bass, guitar, drums, keyboards (4)
- Sky Ferreira – vocals (4)
- Alex Lilly – background vocals (4, 11)
- Brent Paschke – guitar (5)
- Greg Kurstin – drums, bass, synthesizers, keyboards (6)
- Terrell Hines – vocals (7)
- Chris Martin – vocals (8)
- Jason Falkner – guitar (8)
- Smokey Hormel – guitar (9)
- Carl F. Martin – choir (11)
- Kimberly Cook – choir (11)
- Princess Fortier – choir (11)
- Kanisha Leffall – choir (11)
- Jacob Lusk – choir (11)
- Viviana Owens – choir (11)
- Tiana Paul – choir (11)
- Tai Phillips – choir (11)
- Tunay Raymond – choir (11)

Technical personnel

- David Greenbaum – mixing (1, 4–7, 9, 10), recording, additional production, additional programming (11)
- Serban Ghenea – mixing (2)
- Jaycen Joshua – mixing (3)
- Shawn Everett – mixing (8, 11)
- Andrew Coleman – recording
- Mike Larson – recording, additional programming (3, 11)
- Drew Brown – recording
- Cole M.G.N. – recording
- Greg Kurstin – recording
- Alex Pasco – recording
- Julian Burg – recording
- Paul Epworth – recording
- Matt Wiggins – recording
- Eric Eylands – recording assistance
- Ben Sedano – recording assistance
- Chris Henry – recording assistance
- John Hanes – mix assistance
- Ivan Wayman – mix assistance
- Jacob Richards – mix assistance
- Mike Seaberg – mix assistance
- DJ Higgins – mix assistance
- Randy Merrill – mastering

Artwork

- Jimmy Turrell – art direction
- Abdul Ali – art direction
- Free Marseille – art direction
- Beck Hansen – design concept
- Mikai Karl – photography
- Paul Moore – additional design

== Charts ==
Chart performance for Hyperspace
Chart (2019)	Peak position
Australian Albums (ARIA)	33
Belgian Albums (Ultratop Flanders)	31
Belgian Albums (Ultratop Wallonia)	79
Canadian Albums (Billboard)	48
Czech Albums (ČNS IFPI)	61
Dutch Albums (Album Top 100)	46
French Albums (SNEP)	145
Irish Albums (IRMA)	57
Japan Hot Albums (Billboard Japan)	26
Japanese Albums (Oricon)	20
Scottish Albums (Official Charts)	22
Swiss Albums (Schweizer Hitparade)	33
UK Albums (Official Charts)	33
US Billboard 200	40
