= Saw Lightning =

Single by Beck

from the album Hyperspace
- Released: April 15, 2019
- Genre: Alternative rock, synth-pop, folk pop
- Length: 4:01
- Label: Capitol
- Songwriter(s): Beck; Pharrell Williams
- Producer(s): Beck; Pharrell Williams

Beck singles chronology
"Colors" (2018)	"Saw Lightning" (2019)	"Uneventful Days" (2019)

"Saw Lightning" is a song by the American musician Beck. It was released in 2019 as the first single from his fourteenth studio album Hyperspace. It was co-written by Beck and Pharrell Williams. Aside from vocals, Williams also plays drums and keyboards in the song.

== Background ==
Beck said: "I was making a record called Midnite Vultures and while we were making it… I remember the Neptunes [Pharrell's production duo] had just come out, and I said I'm gonna do the next record with the Neptunes, and here we are 20 years later".

== Reception ==
Daniel Kreps of Rolling Stone wrote that the song "melds the jangly acoustic guitar of Beck's folksier work with the dancefloor-ready programmed beats prominent in his 2017 LP Colors".

UDiscoverMusic wrote of the song: "A classic slice of cross-genre boundary-breaking, 'Saw Lightning' sees Beck taking an about-turn from the euphoric pop of Colors to assemble a junkyard-blues-hip-hop confection featuring rapped vocals" and "some One Foot in the Grave- style blues harmonica".

== Personnel ==
According to Jaxsta:

- Beck – vocals, slide guitar, piano, harmonica
- Pharrell Williams – drums, keyboards, additional vocals

== Charts ==
=== Weekly charts ===
Chart (2019)	Peak position
Japan Hot Overseas (Billboard)	9
US Hot Rock & Alternative Songs (Billboard)	19
US Adult Alternative Songs (Billboard)	3
US Alternative Airplay (Billboard)	25
US Rock Airplay (Billboard)	25

=== Year-end charts ===
Chart (2019)	Position
US Adult Alternative Songs (Billboard)	21
