= Dark Places (song) =

2019 single by Beck

Single by Beck

from the album Hyperspace
- Released: November 7, 2019
- Length: 3:45
- Label: Capitol
- Songwriters: Beck, Pharrell Williams
- Producers: Beck, Pharrell Williams

Beck singles chronology
"Uneventful Days" (2019)	"Dark Places" (2019)	"Everlasting Nothing" (2019)

"Dark Places" is a song by the American musician Beck. It was released on November 7, 2019 as the third single from his fourteenth studio album Hyperspace. A lyric video was also created for the song, made by Eddie Obrand. Consequence of Sound described the video as "dreamy".

== Critical reception ==
Tom Breihan of Stereogum called "Dark Places" "a slow, ambling song, built from both an acoustic-guitar strum and a rich, hazy synth sound. Beck, singing as high as his voice will let him go, reflects on a breakup", as evidenced by the lyrics "Time moves on, and on and love, it goes / Now she’s gone, and all I see are shadows". He thought that the song sounded closer to the album Sea Change, rather than Midnite Vultures. Exclaim! described the song as "more than a little smooth".
