= Everlasting Nothing =

Single by Beck

from the album Hyperspace
- Released: November 14, 2019
- Length: 5:00
- Label: Capitol
- Songwriters: Beck, Pharrell Williams
- Producers: Beck, Pharrell Williams

Beck singles chronology
"Dark Places" (2019)	"Everlasting Nothing" (2019)	"The Valley of the Pagans" (2020)

"Everlasting Nothing" is a song by the American musician Beck. It was released on November 14, 2019, as the fourth single from his fourteenth studio album Hyperspace. Beck and Pharrell Williams wrote and produced "Everlasting Nothing", and played all the instruments on it. Beck sings, plays guitar and piano, while Williams plays drums and keyboard. It also features a choir.

Beck had already performed "Everlasting Nothing" twice in 2013, both at shows in California.

== Critical reception ==
Claire Shaffer of Rolling Stone wrote that the song "combines Beck's guitar-laden folk-pop with some quirky Pharrell additions: sci-fi synthesizers, calming bongos and staccato drum machines give it a distinctively space-age vibe". Stereogum wrote that the song "could've easily been a pretty good Morning Phase-type song, but it keeps twisting and adding on more interesting musical choices, and it's all the better for it".
