= List of awards and nominations received by Beck =

Beck awards and nominations
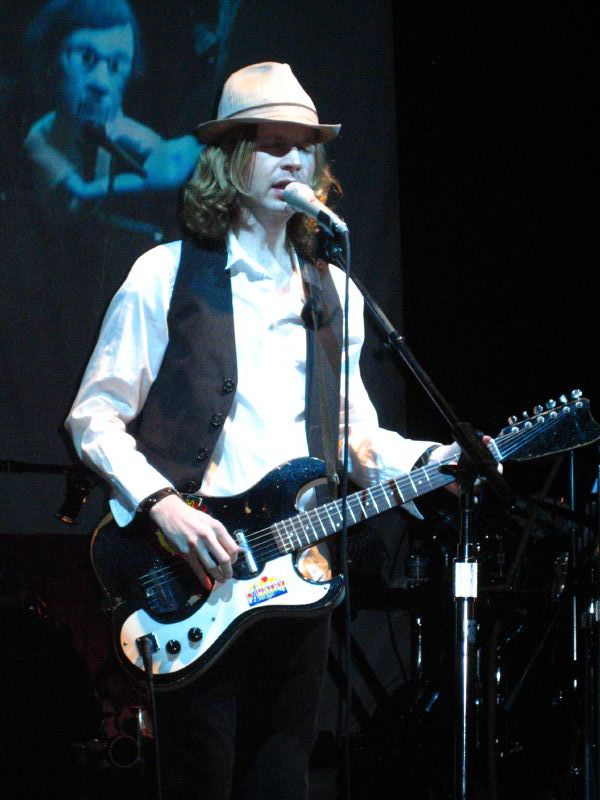
- Beck in concert on September 29, 2006, playing his primary guitar, a Vintage Danelectro Silvertone
Awards and nominations
Award	Wins	Nominations
American Music Awards	0	1
Brit	3	6
Grammy	8	22
MTV VMA	6	15

Totals (Note: Certain award groups do not simply award one winner. They acknowledge several different recipients, have runners-up, and have third place. Since this is a specific recognition and is different from losing an award, runner-up mentions are considered wins in this award tally. For simplification and to avoid errors, each award in this list has been presumed to have had a prior nomination.)
- Wins: 44
- Nominations: 110

Beck is an American musician, singer-songwriter, and multi-instrumentalist from Los Angeles, California. He has released twelve studio albums: Mellow Gold (1994), Odelay (1996), Mutations (1998), Midnite Vultures (1999), Sea Change (2002), Guero (2005), The Information (2006), Modern Guilt (2008), Morning Phase (2014), Colors (2017),Hyperspace (2019), and Ride Lonesome (2026). The album Mellow Gold was certified Platinum by the Recording Industry Association of America and Odelay was certified double Platinum. Mutations, Midnite Vultures, Sea Change, and Guero were certified Gold.

Beck has won 8 Grammy Awards from 23 nominations, including Album of the Year in 2015 for Morning Phase. The song "Where It's At" received the Best Rock Vocal Performance – Male award and the album Odelay won Best Alternative Music Performance. He has received 6 awards from 15 nominations at the MTV Video Music Awards. In 1997, he received the Best Male Video and Best Editing awards for the song "Devils Haircut", and the song "The New Pollution" earned him Best Art Direction, Best Choreography, and Best Direction, while also receiving nominations for Video of the Year and Best Alternative Video. Overall, Beck has received 18 awards from 54 nominations.

== ASCAP Pop Music Awards ==
The ASCAP Pop Music Awards honors the songwriters and publishers of the most performed pop songs.

Year	Nominee / work	Award	Result	Ref.
1997	Beck	College Radio Award	Won	

== American Music Awards ==
The American Music Awards is an annual awards ceremony created by Dick Clark in 1973. Beck has received one nomination.

Year	Nominee / work	Award	Result
1998	Beck	Favorite Pop/Rock Male Artist	Nominated

== Antville Music Video Awards ==
The Antville Music Video Awards are online awards for the best music video and music video directors of the year. They were first awarded in 2005. Beck has received two awards from three nominations.

Year	Nominee / work	Award	Result
2005	"E-Pro"	Best Video	Nominated
2009	"Heaven Can Wait"	Best Art Direction	Won
2009	"Heaven Can Wait"	Video of the Year	Won

== Berlin Music Video Awards ==
The Berlin Music Video Awards (BMVA) are an annual festival that puts filmmakers and the art behind music videos in the spotlight. Supporting both unknown and famous artists, it is a primary networking event for the video and music industries in Europe.

Year	Nominee / work	Award	Result
2018	"Up All Night"	Best Concept	Nominated

== Billboard Music Video Awards ==
The Billboard Music Video Awards is an annual awards show, founded by the music magazine Billboard and first held in 1989.

Year	Nominee / work	Award	Result
1997	"The New Pollution"	Alternative/Modern Rock Clip of the Year	Nominated

== Brit Awards ==
The Brit Awards are the British Phonographic Industry's annual pop music awards. Beck has received three awards.

Year	Nominee / work	Award	Result
1997	Beck	International Male Solo Artist	Won
1999	Beck	International Male Solo Artist	Won
2000	Beck	International Male Solo Artist	Won
2003	Beck	International Male Solo Artist	Nominated
2004	Beck	International Male Solo Artist	Nominated
2006	Beck	International Male Solo Artist	Nominated
2007	Beck	International Male Solo Artist	Nominated
2009	Beck	International Male Solo Artist	Nominated
2015	Beck	International Male Solo Artist	Nominated
2018	Beck	International Male Solo Artist	Nominated

== California Music Awards ==
The California Music Awards is a music and entertainment ceremony founded by BAM (magazine).

Year	Nominee / work	Award	Result
2000	Midnite Vultures	Outstanding Album	Nominated
2000	Midnite Vultures	Outstanding Pop/Rock Album	Nominated
2000	Himself	Outstanding Male Vocalist	Nominated

== D&AD Awards ==
Design and Art Direction (D&AD) is a British educational charity which exists to promote excellence in design and advertising.

Year	Nominee / work	Award	Result
1997	"Devils Haircut"	Pop Promo Video with a budget over 40.000	Wood Pencil
2006	"Girl"	Music Video	Wood Pencil
2006	"Girl"	Special Effects	Wood Pencil
2007	"Cellphone's Dead"	Special Effects	Wood Pencil
2007	"Cellphone's Dead"	Art Direction	Wood Pencil
2010	"Heaven Can Wait"	Music Video	Graphite Pencil

== Denmark GAFFA Awards ==
Delivered since 1991. The GAFFA Awards (Danish: GAFFA Prisen) are a Danish award that rewards popular music awarded by the magazine of the same name.

Year	Nominee / work	Award	Result	Ref.
1995	Himself	Best Foreign Solo Act	Nominated	
2000	Himself	Best Foreign Solo Act	Nominated	

== Grammy Awards ==
The Grammy Awards are awarded annually by the National Academy of Recording Arts and Sciences of the United States. Beck has received 8 awards from 23 nominations.

Year	Nominee / work	Award	Result
1995	"Loser"	Best Male Rock Vocal Performance	Nominated
1997	"Where It's At"	Best Male Rock Vocal Performance	Won
1997	Odelay	Album of the Year	Nominated
1997	Odelay	Best Alternative Music Performance	Won
2000	Mutations	Best Alternative Music Performance	Won
2001	Midnite Vultures	Album of the Year	Nominated
2001	Midnite Vultures	Best Alternative Music Album	Nominated
2003	Sea Change	Best Alternative Music Album	Nominated
2006	Guero	Best Alternative Music Album	Nominated
2007	"Nausea"	Best Solo Rock Vocal Performance	Nominated
2008	"Timebomb"	Best Solo Rock Vocal Performance	Nominated
2009	Modern Guilt	Best Alternative Music Album	Nominated
2015	Morning Phase	Album of the Year	Won
2015	Morning Phase	Best Rock Album	Won
2015	"Blue Moon"	Best Rock Performance	Nominated
2015	"Blue Moon"	Best Rock Song	Nominated
2018	"Up All Night"	Best Music Video	Nominated
2019	"Colors"	Best Pop Solo Performance	Nominated
2019	Colors	Best Alternative Music Album	Won
2019	Colors	Best Engineered Album, Non-Classical	Won
2021	Hyperspace	Best Alternative Music Album	Nominated
2021	Hyperspace	Best Engineered Album, Non-Classical	Won
2023	Old Man	Best Rock Performance	Nominated

== Hungarian Music Awards ==
The Hungarian Music Awards (Golden Giraffe Awards, before 2004) is an annual award ceremony held by the Hungarian music industry association Mahasz since 1992.

Year	Nominee / work	Award	Result
2015	Morning Phase	International Alternative Music of the Year	Won

== London International Awards ==
The London International Awards are a worldwide awards annually honoring excellence in advertising, digital media, production, design, music & sound and branded entertainment. It was the first international advertising award of its kind to acknowledge all media and methods from around the world to be judged by a diverse global jury.

Year	Nominee / work	Award	Result
2016	"Wide Open" (with The Chemical Brothers)	Best Visual Effects	Gold

== MTV Europe Music Awards ==
The MTV Europe Music Awards (EMA) were established in 1994 by MTV Networks Europe to celebrate the most popular music videos in Europe.

Year	Nominee / work	Award	Result
1994	"Loser"	Best Song	Nominated
1994	Himself	Best New Act	Nominated
1996	Himself	Best Male	Nominated
1997	Himself	Best Male	Nominated
1997	Himself	Best Alternative	Nominated
2005	Himself	Best Alternative	Nominated
2005	"E-Pro"	Best Video	Nominated

== MTV Video Music Awards ==
The MTV Video Music Awards is an annual awards ceremony established in 1984 by MTV. Beck has received 6 awards from 15 nominations.

Year	Nominee / work	Award	Result
1994	"Loser"	Best Male Video	Nominated
1994	"Loser"	Best New Artist	Nominated
1994	"Loser"	Best Alternative Video	Nominated
1996	"Where It's At"	Best Male Video	Won
1996	"Where It's At"	Best Editing (Editor: Eric Zumbrunnen)	Nominated
1997	"The New Pollution"	Video of the Year	Nominated
1997	"The New Pollution"	Best Alternative Video	Nominated
1997	"The New Pollution"	Best Direction (Director: Beck Hansen)	Won
1997	"The New Pollution"	Best Choreography (Choreographer: Peggy Hickey)	Won
1997	"The New Pollution"	Best Art Direction (Art Director: K. K. Barrett)	Won
1997	"Devils Haircut"	Best Male Video	Won
1997	"Devils Haircut"	Best Editing (Editor: Hank Corwin)	Won
1998	"Deadweight"	Best Video from a Film (from A Life Less Ordinary)	Nominated
2005	"E-Pro"	Best Male Video	Nominated
2006	"Hell Yes"	Best Special Effects (Special Effects: Hammer & Tongs )	Nominated

== MVPA Awards ==
The MVPA Awards are annually presented by a Los Angeles-based music trade organization to honor the year's best music videos.

Year	Nominee / work	Award	Result
1998	"Deadweight"	Feature Film Video of the Year	Won
2005	"Black Tambourine"	Best Video Produced For Under $25,000	Nominated
2005	"E-Pro"	Best Animated Video	Nominated
2005	"E-Pro"	Best Alternative Video	Nominated
2006	"Girl"	Best Alternative Video	Nominated
2006	"Girl"	Best Director of a Male Artist	Nominated
2006	"Girl"	Best Art Direction	Nominated
2006	"Girl"	Best Styling	Nominated
2006	"Girl"	Best Special Effects	Won
2007	"Cellphone's Dead"	Best Alternative Video	Won

== Meteor Music Awards ==
Launched in 2001, the Meteor Music Awards are awarded for achievements in the Irish and international record industry. Beck has received one nomination.

Year	Nominee / work	Award	Result
2006	Himself	Best International Male	Nominated

== NME Awards ==
The NME Awards were created by the NME magazine and was first held in 1953. Beck has received four awards from seven nominations.

Year	Nominee / work	Award	Result
1997	Odelay	Best LP	Won
1997	Himself	Best Solo Artist	Won
1998	Himself	Best Solo Artist	Won
2000	Himself	Best Solo Artist	Won
2008	Himself	Best American Alternative/Indie Solo Artist	Nominated
2014	Song Reader	Best Book	Nominated
2020	Himself	Best Solo Act in the World	Nominated

== New Music Awards ==
The New Music Awards are given for excellence in music to both recording artists and radio stations by New Music Weekly magazine.

Year	Nominee / work	Award	Result
2018	Himself	College Artist of the Year	Won

== Pollstar Concert Industry Awards ==
The Pollstar Concert Industry Awards aim to reward the best in the business of shows and concerts.

Year	Nominee / work	Award	Result
1997	Tour	Club Tour of the Year	Nominated
1998	Tour	Small Hall Tour of the Year	Won

== Rober Awards Music Poll ==
Year	Nominee / work	Award	Result
2014	Himself	Comeback of the Year	Nominated

== Soundie Music Video Awards ==
Soundie Music Video Awards is an international event dedicated to Music Videos held in Barcelona. Since 2016 it has become the occasion to share the best music video works representing international, national and local producers.

Year	Nominee / work	Award	Result
2017	"Up All Night"	Best Catalan Music Video	Won

== Space Shower Music Video Awards ==
The Space Shower Music Video Awards are an annual set of music awards sponsored by Space Shower TV in Japan.

Year	Nominee / work	Award	Result
2000	"Sexx Laws"	Best International Video	Won

== Spike Video Game Awards ==
The Spike Video Game Awards (VGA) is an annual award show hosted by Spike TV that recognizes the best computer and video games of the year.

Year	Nominee / work	Award	Result
2012	"Cities"	Best Song in a Game	Won

== UK Music Video Awards ==
The UK Music Video Awards is an annual award ceremony founded in 2008 to recognise creativity, technical excellence and innovation in music videos and moving images for music. Beck has received four awards from seven nominations.

Year	Nominee / work	Award	Result
2010	"Heaven Can Wait"	Best Indie/Alternative Video	Won
2013	"Hello Again"	Best Interactive Video	Nominated
2016	"Wide Open" (feat. The Chemical Brothers)	Best Animation	Nominated
2016	"Wide Open" (feat. The Chemical Brothers)	Best Visual Effects	Won
2016	"Wide Open" (feat. The Chemical Brothers)	Best Dance Video – UK	Won
2017	"Up All Night"	Best Alternative Video – International	Won
2017	"Up All Night"	Best Styling	Nominated

== Viva Comet Awards ==
VIVA Comet Awards were an annual awards ceremony, organised by VIVA Germany.

Year	Nominee / work	Award	Result
2000	"Sexx Laws"	Best International Video	Nominated

== Webby Awards ==
A Webby Award is an award for excellence on the Internet presented annually by The International Academy of Digital Arts and Sciences.

Year	Nominee / work	Award	Result
2018	Hello, Again: Beck 360 Experience	Online Film & Video – Best Use of Interactive Video	Nominated

== World Music Awards ==
The World Music Award is an international awards show founded in 1989 that annually honors recording artists based on worldwide sales figures provided by the International Federation of the Phonographic Industry (IFPI).

Year	Nominee / work	Award	Result
2014	Himself	World's Best Live Act	Nominated

== Žebřík Music Awards ==
Year	Nominee / work	Award	Result	Ref.
2005	Himself	Best International Male	Nominated	
