= Ride Lonesome =

Ride Lonesome may refer to:

- Ride Lonesome (film), 1959 American Western film
- Ride Lonesome (album), 2026 studio album by American musician Beck
  - "Ride Lonesome" (song), the title track

== See also ==
- "Lonesome Rider", song by Swiss hard rock band Krokus from the 1977 album, To You All
