= Grammy Award for Best Solo Rock Vocal Performance =

Honor presented to recording artists for quality rock vocal performances

- Awarded for: Quality vocal performances in the rock music genre
- Country: United States
- Presented by: National Academy of Recording Arts and Sciences
- First award: 1988
- Final award: 2011
- Currently held by: Paul McCartney, "Helter Skelter" (2011)
- Website: grammy.com

The Grammy Award for Best Solo Rock Vocal Performance was an award presented at the Grammy Awards, a ceremony that was established in 1958 and originally called the Gramophone Awards, to recording artists for works (songs or albums) containing quality vocal performances in the rock music genre. Honors in several categories are presented at the ceremony annually by the National Academy of Recording Arts and Sciences of the United States to "honor artistic achievement, technical proficiency and overall excellence in the recording industry, without regard to album sales or chart position".

Originally called the Grammy Award for Best Rock Vocal Performance, Solo, the award was first presented to Bruce Springsteen in 1988 for the album Tunnel of Love. Since then, the award was presented in 1992 and 1994, and has been awarded each year since 2005. Beginning with the 2005 ceremony, the name of the award was changed to Best Solo Rock Vocal Performance. For these years, the award combined and replaced the gender-specific awards for Best Male Rock Vocal Performance and Best Female Rock Vocal Performance. This fusion has been criticized, especially when females are not nominated under the solo category. The Academy has cited a lack of eligible recordings in the female rock category as the reason for the mergers.

The award was discontinued in 2012 in a major overhaul of Grammy categories. All solo or duo/group performances in the rock category are now honored in the Best Rock Performance category. Springsteen holds the record for the most wins in this category, with five (he has also received three awards for Best Male Rock Vocal Performance). No other performing artists had received the award more than once. Neil Young holds the record for the most nominations without a win, with four.

== Recipients ==
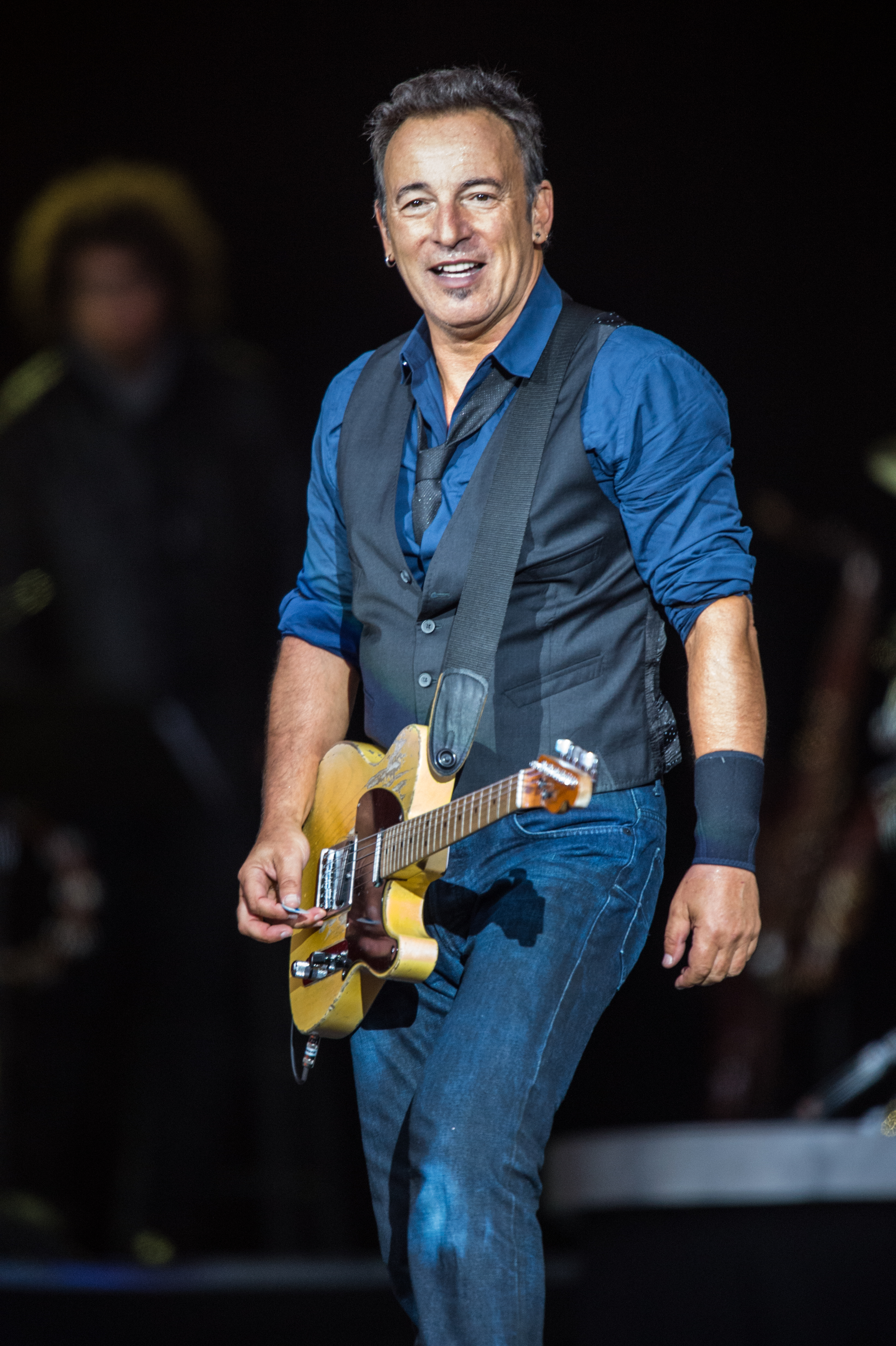
Five-time award winner Bruce Springsteen, performing in 2012

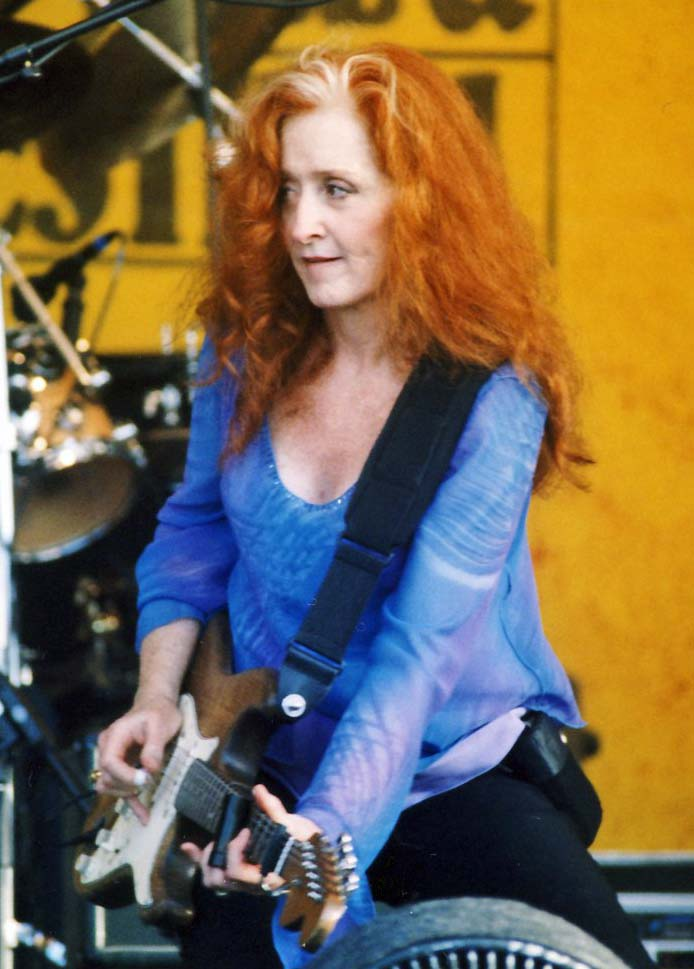
1992 award winner Bonnie Raitt performing in 2010.

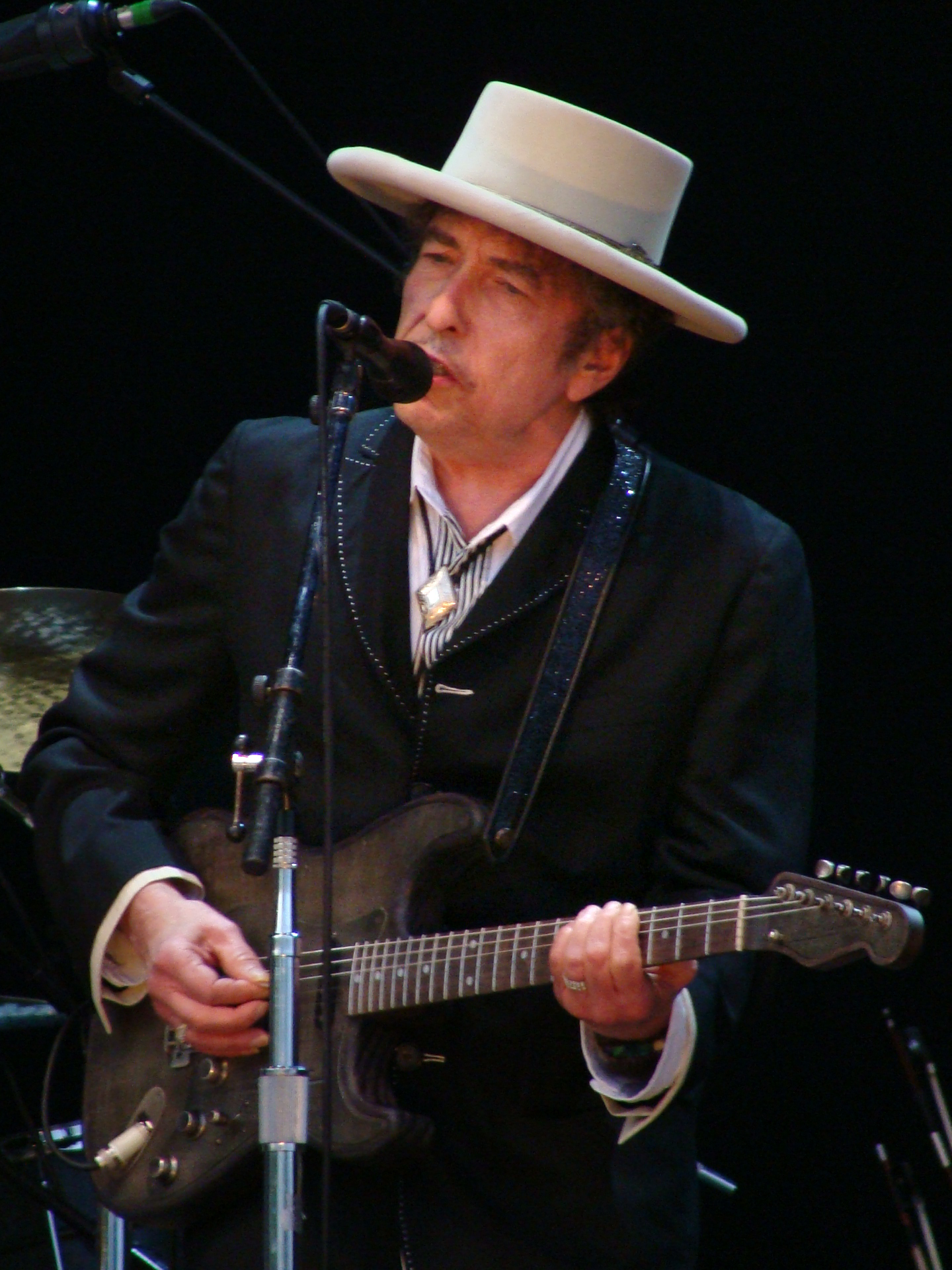
2007 award winner Bob Dylan, performing in 2006

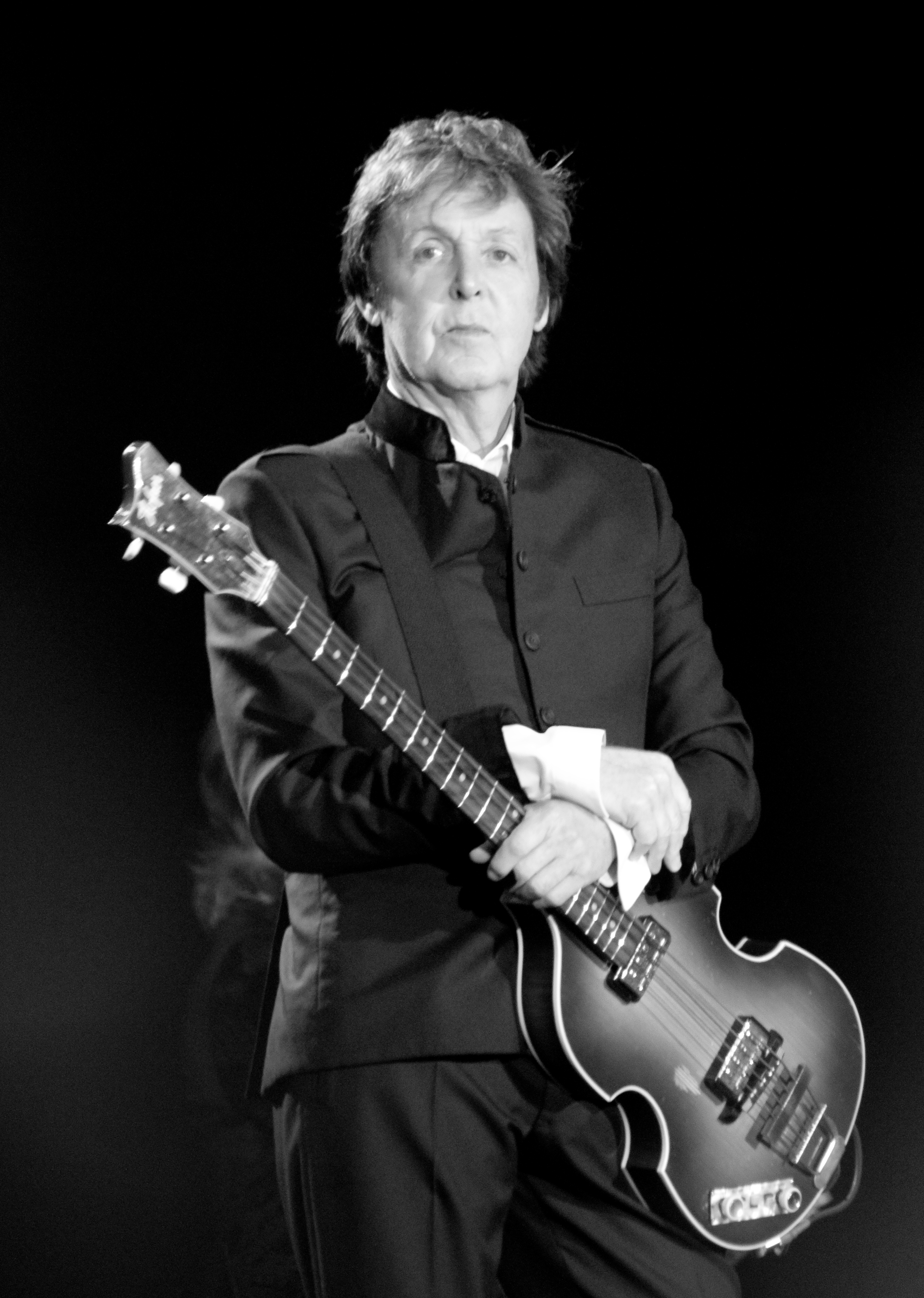
2011 award winner Paul McCartney

Year^{[I]}	Performing artist	Work	Nominees	Ref.
1988	Bruce Springsteen	Tunnel of Love	Joe Cocker – "Unchain My Heart"; Richard Marx – "Don't Mean Nothing"; Bob Seger – "Shakedown"; Tina Turner – "Better Be Good to Me (Live)"	
1989–1991^{[II]}	—N/a	—N/a	—N/a	
1992	Bonnie Raitt	Luck of the Draw	Bryan Adams – "Can't Stop This Thing We Started"; Eric Clapton – 24 Nights; John Mellencamp – "Whenever We Wanted"; Robbie Robertson – Storyville; Bob Seger – The Fire Inside	
1993^{[II]}	—N/a	—N/a	—N/a	
1994	Meat Loaf	"I'd Do Anything for Love (But I Won't Do That)"	Neil Young – "All Along the Watchtower"; Peter Gabriel – "Steam"; Lenny Kravitz – "Are You Gonna Go My Way"; Sting – "Demolition Man"	
1995–2004^{[II]}	—N/a	—N/a	—N/a	—N/a
2005	Bruce Springsteen	"Code of Silence"	Ryan Adams – "Wonderwall"; Steve Earle – "The Revolution Starts Now"; Melissa Etheridge – "Breathe"; Tom Waits – "Metropolitan Glide"	
2006	Bruce Springsteen	"Devils & Dust"	Eric Clapton – "Revolution"; Robert Plant – "Shine It All Around"; Rob Thomas – "This Is How a Heart Breaks"; Neil Young – "The Painter"	
2007	Bob Dylan	"Someday Baby"	Beck – "Nausea"; John Mayer – "Route 66"; Tom Petty – "Saving Grace"; Neil Young – "Lookin' for a Leader"	
2008	Bruce Springsteen	"Radio Nowhere"	Beck – "Timebomb"; Paul McCartney – "Only Mama Knows"; John Mellencamp – "Our Country"; Lucinda Williams – "Come On"	
2009	John Mayer	"Gravity"	Paul McCartney – "I Saw Her Standing There"; Bruce Springsteen – "Girls in Their Summer Clothes"; Eddie Vedder – "Rise"; Neil Young – "No Hidden Path"	
2010	Bruce Springsteen	"Working on a Dream"	Bob Dylan – "Beyond Here Lies Nothin'"; John Fogerty – "Change in the Weather"; Prince – "Dreamer"; Neil Young – "Fork in the Road"	
2011	Paul McCartney	"Helter Skelter"	Eric Clapton – "Run Back to Your Side"; John Mayer – "Crossroads"; Robert Plant – "Silver Rider"; Neil Young – "Angry World"	

^{^[I]} Each year is linked to the article about the Grammy Awards held that year.
^{^[II]} Award was separated into the gender-specific awards for Best Rock Vocal Performance, Male and Best Rock Vocal Performance, Female.

== See also ==
- American rock
- List of Grammy Award categories
