= Gamma Ray (song) =

- Cover for the "A" version

Single by Beck

from the album Modern Guilt
- B-side: Jay Reatard Version; "Bonfire Blondes"
- Released: August 11, 2008
- Genre: Surf rock
- Length: 2:58
- Label: XL
- Songwriter: Beck Hansen
- Producers: Beck; Danger Mouse

Beck singles chronology
"Chemtrails" (2008)	"Gamma Ray" (2008)	"Youthless" (2008)

Music video
- "Gamma Ray" (Version 1) on YouTube "Gamma Ray" (Version 2) on YouTube

Alternative cover
- Cover for the "B" version

"Gamma Ray" is a song by American rock musician Beck. It was released as the second single from his eighth studio album, Modern Guilt, on August 11, 2008. It is seemingly inspired by the surf rock songs of the 1960s, but with ghostly moans and lyrics on the state of the world. The title refers to gamma rays, biologically hazardous energy emitted by radioactive decay. Despite its up-tempo beat, the song lyrics invoke nihilistic or apocalyptic themes, including melting ice caps, boredom, burning houses, crowns of thorns, and natural disasters. The song peaked at number 19 on the U.S. Billboard Modern Rock Tracks chart. It was also placed at number 6 on Rolling Stone's list of the 100 Best Songs of 2008.

== Release ==
The single releases of the song feature a cover of the song by garage punk musician Jay Reatard and a non-album song entitled "Bonfire Blondes" as B-sides, both of which are available on iTunes. The song is included as a playable track in the video game Guitar Hero 5 and was used in Tony Hawk: Ride. Both the A side and B side album cover arts make use of a Houndstooth pattern.

== Music video ==
The first version of the music video, directed by Jess Holzworth, features actress and style icon Chloë Sevigny. The second version involves scenes of abstract imagery (most in black and white). There is film of Beck standing amidst many people dressed in white with white boxes on the heads. There is also film of mouths and eyes and a woman with an afro.

== Track listing ==
(A)

1. "Gamma Ray" (2:58)
2. "Gamma Ray" (2:59) (cover by Jay Reatard)

(B)

1. "Gamma Ray" (2:58)
2. "Bonfire Blondes" (2:25)

== Personnel ==
- Beck Hansen – vocals, guitars, electric piano, producer, songwriter
- Danger Mouse – beats, keyboard bass, producer

== Charts ==
Chart (2008)	Peak position
US Alternative Airplay (Billboard)	19
