= In the Night (Beck song) =

Single by Beck

from the album Ride Lonesome
- Released: July 15, 2026
- Length: 2:58
- Label: Capitol
- Songwriter: Beck
- Producer: Beck

Beck singles chronology
"Ride Lonesome" (2026)	"In the Night" (2026)	"Disappearing Act" (2026)

Music video
- ""In the Night" on YouTube

"In the Night" is a song by the American musician Beck, released as the second single from his fifteenth studio album Ride Lonesome (2026).

== Background and composition ==
"In the Night" is a folk rock and ballad which features a finger picked acoustic guitar, an orchestra, and an upright bass amongst other instruments and vocals. It features most of the musicians that played on his 2014 album Morning Phase.

== Release and reception ==
"In the Night" was issued as the second single from Ride Lonesome on July 15, 2026. Talking about the single in a Stereoboard article, Jon Stickler called it a "haunting track that blends finger-picked acoustic guitar with sweeping orchestral arrangements." Under the Radar writer Mark Redford wrote that it, alongside "Ride Lonesome" "both have a '70s singer/songwriter vibe more akin to his albums Sea Change and Morning Phase".

The music video stars the French actor Denis Lavant.

== Credits and personnel ==
According to Tidal:

- Beck – vocals, synthesizer, songwriter, producer, electric bass, acoustic guitar
- Stanley Clarke – upright bass
- Thomas Harte – bass
- Blake Mills – acoustic guitar
- Charlie Tyler, Jacob Braun, Paula Hochalter – cello
- Allen Fogle, Danielle Ondarza – horn
- Alma Fernandez, Linnea Powell, Luke Maurer – viola
- Carrie Kennedy, Charlie Bisharat, Jessica Guideri, Joel Pargman, Josefina Vergara, Luanne Homzy, Sara Parkins, Tammy Hatwan – violin
