= Youthless =

Single by Beck

from the album Modern Guilt
- B-side: "Half & Half"
- Released: December 22, 2008
- Genre: Alternative rock
- Length: 2:59
- Label: XL
- Songwriter: Beck
- Producers: Danger Mouse; Beck

Beck singles chronology
"Gamma Ray" (2008)	"Youthless" (2008)	"Heaven Can Wait" (2009)

"Youthless" is a song by Beck. It was released as the third single from his album Modern Guilt in 2008. The single release of the song features an alternative mix (dubbed "Mix K") of "Youthless" and a non-album song titled "Half & Half". The 7-inch single is pressed on white vinyl. The digital download of the single is only available in the UK.

== Music video ==
The music video, directed by Kris Moyes, features Beck's toys, dolls and statues being crafted by hands with gloves, then the dolls and Beck's toys start to sing and dance.

== Track listing ==
1. "Youthless" (Mix K) – 3:01
2. "Half & Half" – 2:21

== Personnel ==
- Beck Hansen – vocals, guitar, producer, songwriter
- Matt Mahaffey – bass guitar
- Greg Kurstin – synthesizer
- Brian LeBarton – synthesizer
- Danger Mouse – beats, producer
- Larry Corbett – cello
