= Chemtrails (song) =

2008 single by Beck

Single by Beck

from the album Modern Guilt
- B-side: "Vampire Voltage No. 6"
- Released: June 22, 2008
- Genre: Alternative rock; dream pop
- Length: 4:39
- Label: DGC
- Songwriter: Beck Hansen
- Producer: Danger Mouse

Beck singles chronology
"Timebomb" (2007)	"Chemtrails" (2008)	"Gamma Ray" (2008)

"Chemtrails" is a song by American musician Beck, released digitally on June 22, 2008, as a single from his eleventh studio album, Modern Guilt.

The artwork for the single uses a design based on Houndstooth patterning.

== Release and reception ==
"Chemtrails" was premiered by Zane Lowe on BBC Radio 1 on May 19, 2008. The song was made available to stream from Beck's official website and his MySpace. The song was available to download on June 22, 2008, or a day later in the United States, as well as a pre-order of Modern Guilt. The song's title refers to the chemtrail conspiracy theory, as do the lyrics: "I can't believe/What we've seen outside/You and me/Watching the jets go by".

The critical reception for "Chemtrails" was highly positive. Kitty Empire of The Observer compared the "beautiful" song to a clash between The Beatles and My Bloody Valentine. USA Today featured the song on its weekly playlist, complimenting Beck's "eerie falsetto over slow-building industrialized Radiohead-like ambience." Billboard said that "Beck's falsetto singing rides along a bouncing bassline and crashing drums, with Danger Mouse's trademark production touches filing [sic] the crannies." Pitchfork's Ryan Dombal called it "the record's best psych-rock showing" and the song featured "a wicked drum exhibition" The song was described as "trippy" by MTV News. "Chemtrails" received high praise for "its woozy textures ... with Beck's distracted vocal and a busy drum track complementing each other perfectly." James Lawrenson, writing for ClickMusic, said the song was "like a more electrified Sea Change, ambient and slightly sombre, but beautiful nonetheless." The review described the song's "synth washes and sparse instrumentation" as creating "an airy, atmospheric feel."

As promotion for the album, limited edition copies of a "Chemtrails" 7" were distributed to independent record stores and were given to customers upon purchase of the album. The B-side is a song entitled "Vampire Voltage No. 6". Copies made in the UK were pressed on glow-in-the-dark white vinyl, while copies made for the US were pressed on standard black vinyl.

In Italy, this song is used as the theme song to L'era glaciale ("The Ice Age", not to be confused with the film Ice Age), a talk show hosted by Italian TV personality Daria Bignardi on Rai 2, which was aired between 20 March and 4 December 2009.

"Chemtrails" was likely influenced by Aphrodite's Child's song The Four Horsemen, which has a similar structure.

== Track listing ==
Digital download

1. "Chemtrails" – 4:39

7"

1. "Chemtrails" – 4:39
2. "Vampire Voltage No. 6" – 2:19

== Personnel ==
- Beck – vocals
- Greg Kurstin – organ, piano
- Joey Waronker – drums
- Jason Falkner – bass, electric guitar
- David Campbell – string arrangement
