= Think I'm in Love =

Think I'm in Love may refer to:

- "Think I'm in Love", a song by Diana Ross from her 1981 album Why Do Fools Fall in Love
- "Think I'm in Love" (Eddie Money song), a song by Eddie Money from his 1982 album No Control
- "Think I'm in Love", a song by Spiritualized from their 1997 album Ladies and Gentlemen We Are Floating in Space
- "Think I'm in Love" (Beck song), a song by Beck from his 2006 album The Information
- "Think I'm in Love Again", a song by Paul Anka from his 1981 album Both Sides of Love
- "I Think I'm in Love", a song by Daniel Merriweather from his 2009 album Love & War (Daniel Merriweather album)
