= Disappearing Act (song) =

Single by Beck

from the album Ride Lonesome
- Released: August 19, 2026
- Genre: Psychedelic folk
- Length: 2:59
- Label: Capitol
- Songwriter: Beck
- Producer: Beck

Beck singles chronology
"In the Night" (2026)	"Disappearing Act" (2026)

"Disappearing Act" is a song by the American musician Beck, released as the third single from his fifteenth studio album Ride Lonesome (2026).

== Background and composition ==
"Disappearing Act" features stacked harmonies and is reverb-heavy, with lyrics touching on the unknown, and primarily features an acoustic guitar, but also includes strings, steel guitar, and drums.

== Release and reception ==
In an announcement of the single for NME, Tom Skinner called it a "ethereal acoustic track" where beck "brings the listener into a tranquil world as he bathes in the evening sun." Robin Murray wrote that "Beck's honeyed vocal is fringed with age and maturity", calling it "Typically gorgeous" Larisha Paul in Rolling Stone called it an "airy, lyrically sparse and string-backed song about moving in a new direction." Tom Breihan of Stereogum called it a "lush and relaxing track with some real celestial harmonies working for it", adding it "almost seems unfair that Beck can lock right back in with this style, seemingly effortlessly, whenever he feels like it."

== Personnel ==
Adapted from Tidal:

- Beck – acoustic guitar, vocals
- Roger Joseph Manning Jr. – synthesizer, backing vocals
- Joey Waronker – drums
- Smokey Hormel – acoustic guitar, slide guitar
- Justin Meldal-Johnsen – bass

== Charts ==
Chart performance for "Disappearing Act"
Chart (2026)	Peak position
Japan Hot Overseas (Billboard Japan)	13
