= Orphans (Beck song) =

Promotional single by Beck

from the album Modern Guilt
- Released: July 2008
- Recorded: 2008
- Studio: Anonyme, Los Angeles
- Genre: Psychedelia; alternative rock
- Length: 3:15
- Label: DGC; XL
- Songwriter(s): Beck Hansen
- Producer(s): Danger Mouse; Beck Hansen

Music video
- "Orphans" on YouTube

"Orphans" is a song by American alternative rock musician Beck. It is the opening track on his eleventh studio album Modern Guilt. It is one of two songs off the album to feature Cat Power on backing vocals, whom they recorded the song with for only 45 minutes. The song is also unique for being one of the only times Beck ever played the flute in a song. It was the very first song recorded with famous producer Danger Mouse, which was recorded on the first day they teamed up. Beck has gone on to say that Danger Mouse originally only planned to record this song with him. In an interview on the BBC Radio 6 Music radio station he had stated that:

"We were already friends, so I called him and said, ''Let's do a record'. But he said, 'Well, I don't have time so we'll do one song.' We did the first song on the album ('Orphans') and then decided that there was a whole record there. A couple of months later - we had a whole record."

Since 2008, Beck has played this song 29 times though has not played the song live since 2009. In 2005 or 2006, Beck had done an interview where he was asked on what occasions he cries, He responded saying:

"No, I cried watching this documentary about these Sudanese orphans who get shipped off to America and they don't have parents and one guy talked about how he hadn't seen his parents since he was a little boy. Maybe it's being a father, but that definitely hit me."

Later in a separate interview he has stated that was an inspiration for the song, though the song is not specifically about Sudan but rather the disconnection and dislocation felt by "orphans".

== Music video ==
The music video features Beck playing the song with Bram Inscore on bass & Brian LeBarton on drums over a white background in black and white. The music video can only be found on YouTube and iTunes. It is unknown who directed the music video or when it was first released.

== Personnel ==
- Beck Hansen – vocals, guitar, flute, percussion
- Brian LeBarton – synthesizer
- Jason Falkner – bass guitar
- Cat Power – vocals
- Danger Mouse – beats

== Charts ==
Chart performance for "Orphans"
Chart (2008)	Peak position
US Adult Alternative Songs (Billboard)	4
