= Think I'm in Love (Beck song) =

Single by Beck

from the album The Information
- Released: October 3, 2006
- Genre: Indie rock; alternative rock
- Length: 3:19
- Label: Interscope
- Songwriter: Beck
- Producer: Nigel Godrich

Beck singles chronology
"Cellphone's Dead" (2006)	"Think I'm in Love" (2006)	"Timebomb" (2007)

"Think I'm in Love" is a song by Beck from his seventh major-label studio album, The Information. It was issued as the third single from the album. The single charted at number 22 on the Billboard Modern Rock Tracks chart and number 2 on the Adult Alternative Songs chart.
