= Odyssey (song) =

Single by Phoenix and Beck
- Released: 21 June 2023
- Recorded: 2023
- Genre: Synth-pop; pop rock
- Length: 3:47
- Label: Capitol
- Songwriters: Phoenix; Beck
- Producers: Phoenix; Beck

Phoenix singles chronology
"After Midnight" (2023)	"Odyssey" (2023)

Beck singles chronology
"Thinking About You" (2023)	"Odyssey" (2023)

"Odyssey" is a song by American singer Beck and French band Phoenix, released on 21 June 2023. It is a stand-alone single, and was released to promote the Summer Odyssey Tour, which the two artists headlined together. The track has been described as a "sleeker descendant" of Talking Heads's track "Once in a Lifetime", as well as being overall very upbeat & bouncy. It is featured in the soundtrack for MLB The Show 23 and NHL 24.

== Charts ==
Chart performance for "Odyssey"
Chart (2023)	Peak position
Japan Hot Overseas (Billboard Japan)	2
UK Physical Singles (OCC)	9
UK Vinyl Singles (OCC)	4
US Rock & Alternative Airplay (Billboard)	17
US Alternative Songs (Billboard)	24
US Adult Alternative Airplay (Billboard)	1
