= Cellphone's Dead =

Single by Beck

from the album The Information
- B-side: "O Menina"
- Released: October 2, 2006
- Recorded: Winter 2003 – Spring 2006
- Length: 4:40
- Label: Interscope
- Songwriter: Beck Hansen
- Producer: Nigel Godrich

Beck singles chronology
"Nausea" (2006)	"Cellphone's Dead" (2006)	"Think I'm in Love" (2006)

"Cellphone's Dead" is a song by American musician Beck. It appears on the album The Information (2006) and was also released as a single.

== Composition ==
The opening bass synth riff has been cited as reminiscent in tone and rhythmic character of "Chameleon" by jazz artist Herbie Hancock from his 1973 record Head Hunters.

== Critical reception ==
Writing in The Guardian, Caroline Sullivan describes the song as a "mess of robo-bleeps, cackling children and laconic rapping." However a retrospective in the same publication by Ben Beaumont-Thomas places it at number 18 in his list of Beck's greatest songs. He writes that its "truly classic bassline, perhaps Beck's best, turns this into an elastically danceable bit of boogie". Listeners to the BBC 6 Music radio channel were also relatively enthusiastic, voting it to number 83 in the station's poll of singles of 2006.

== Music video ==
Two videos featuring this song were released. The official version supporting the release of the single was directed by Michel Gondry. It is available on the 2009 DVD compilation Michel Gondry 2: More Videos (Before and After DVD 1).

The video was filmed to resemble one long shot and employs Gondry's signature usage of special effects. In the black-and-white video, Beck walks into an empty house, tuning a radio to different stations, then sitting down in a chair, where he sings the song. Suddenly, the view of the city skyline outside morphs into a 2-dimensional humanoid figure, and the door morphs into a figure as well. As the video progresses, Beck and those two figures morph into each other, transforming into doors and skylines, while the apartment's radio and dresser morph into different forms, as well.

There is also an alternative official video associated to the album track. Interviewed in Wired ahead of the release of The Information, Beck revealed he had created "very low-budget, homemade videos for all the songs on the record … with the idea of having a visual version of the record that we'll put on the Internet." He had "invited our friends and family into the studio to be part of the action".

== BPitch Control remixes ==
A remix 12-inch single was released by Berlin-based label BPitch Control, featuring remixes by Ellen Allien and Ricardo Villalobos. These remixes also appear on disc 2 of the deluxe version of The Information.
