= Heaven Can Wait (Charlotte Gainsbourg song) =

Single by Charlotte Gainsbourg featuring Beck

from the album IRM
- Released: 17 November 2009
- Length: 2:42
- Label: Because
- Songwriter: Beck
- Producer: Beck

Charlotte Gainsbourg singles chronology
"5:55" (2007)	"Heaven Can Wait" (2009)	"Time of the Assassins" (2010)

Beck singles chronology
"Youthless" (2008)	"Heaven Can Wait" (2009)	"I Just Started Hating Some People Today" (2012)

"Heaven Can Wait" is the song by British-French singer and actress Charlotte Gainsbourg from her third studio album IRM. The song prominently features Beck, who wrote the song and produced IRM, on backing vocals. It was chosen as the iTunes Pick of the Week on 2 March 2010.

== Music video ==
=== Synopsis ===
The music video for "Heaven Can Wait" was directed by Keith Schofield. Various scenes are featured as Charlotte Gainsbourg and Beck sing: a dinosaur in a wig (in a bathtub), a giant rat getting held up at knife point, a man in a SpongeBob costume getting tackled by the police, an astronaut with pancakes for a head, a man racing a flying axe, and another man with half a beard.

=== Reception ===
The music video for "Heaven Can Wait" was included on Pitchfork Media's Top Music Videos of 2009. It was also placed at #16 on the "Top 20 Best Music Videos of 2009" by SPIN.

== Track listing ==
- UK CD single
1. "Heaven Can Wait" – 2:42
2. "Heaven Can Wait (Chris Taylor Of Grizzly Bear Remix)" – 2:15
3. "Heaven Can Wait (Nosaj Thing Remix) " – 3:17
4. "Heaven Can Wait (Jackson Escalator Remix)" – 7:05

== Awards ==
Year	Category	Result
Antville Music Video Awards
2009	Best Music Video of the Year	Won
2009	Best Art Direction	Won

== Charts ==
Chart (2009)	Peak Position
Belgian Tip Chart (Flanders)	22
Belgian Singles Chart (Wallonia)	34
Japan Hot 100 Singles	61
