= Nausea (Beck song) =

Single by Beck

from the album The Information
- Released: August 29, 2006
- Genre: Alternative rock
- Length: 2:54
- Label: Interscope
- Songwriter: Beck
- Producer: Nigel Godrich

Beck singles chronology
"Hell Yes" (2005)	"Nausea" (2006)	"Cellphone's Dead" (2006)

"Nausea" is a song by Beck. It was released as the first single from his 2006 album The Information. It reached #13 on the Billboard Modern Rock Tracks chart.

The song appears in the 2010 film Repo Men.

"Nausea" is chiefly an acoustic song with elements of funk and heavy use of various percussion. Beck said he wanted the song "to sound like the Stooges in South America." When performed live, it is done in more of a punk rock vein, more akin to the Stooges.

Beck said that the song's music came quickly, as part of a 7-day marathon of jamming and writing and then going back and taking bits of the jam and expanding. He also said during a performance in May 2006 that he had written it a couple of years before. This would imply it was recorded during one of the earlier sessions for the album.

"Nausea" made its live debut on May 24, 2006, in Davis, California. It was played on the Late Show with David Letterman, during which Sacha Baron Cohen's fictitious Borat made a guest appearance playing the berimbau. Before the performance, Letterman showed a copy of The Information with a sticker of his face on the front. Beck performed "Nausea" on Saturday Night Live on October 28, 2006.

Beck has performed the song close to 100 times. Although it was released as a single, it is not common for Beck to perform the song live.

== Music video ==
There have been four music videos for this song. The first one was made for the deluxe edition of The Information that came with a free DVD with low budget music videos for all the songs on the album. In this video, he is playing in a mansion with people behind him playing guitars. The second video shows Beck walking through a city street with people which turns out to be a music video set. The third features Beck and his band with his concert puppets. The fourth was a skateboarding video in which he did not appear.
