= Timebomb (Beck song) =

Single by Beck
- Released: August 21, 2007
- Recorded: 2006–2007
- Genre: Electronic rock; alternative rock
- Length: 2:50
- Label: Interscope
- Songwriters: Beck Hansen; The Dust Brothers
- Producer: Beck Hansen

Beck singles chronology
"Think I'm in Love" (2006)	"Timebomb" (2007)	"Chemtrails" (2008)

"Timebomb" is a 2007 single by American musician Beck. On August 21, 2007, the single was made available on iTunes. It was released on 12" vinyl on November 2, 2007. A one-track promo-only CD was also produced. "Timebomb" was nominated for the Grammy Award for Best Solo Rock Vocal Performance.

A post from Beck's official website said that it would be "a song for bonfires, blackouts and the last hurrah of summer". It combines aspects of electronica, experimental rock, and alternative rock.

The post on Beck's website said that the cover art "features Ryan in the knitted Aztec Bird costume, some of you may have seen him dancing in on stage the past few years."

The song was featured in the 2008 racing video game Midnight Club: Los Angeles.

== Reception ==
Critical reaction was generally positive. Nate Chinen of The New York Times described the song as "unmistakably playful" but said that "direness lurks beneath the spangles". Conversely, Richard Cromelin of the Los Angeles Times said that the track was "catchy, dynamic, and fun". Rolling Stone magazine said "...house-party DJ's...cue up Beck's New banger - which gets the party started."

== Track listing ==
1. "Timebomb" – 2:50
2. "Timebomb" (Instrumental) – 2:50

== Personnel ==
- Beck Hansen – hand claps, synthesizer, vocals
- Brian LeBarton – drum machine, guitar, hand claps, synthesizer, backing vocals
- Brianna Bell – backing vocals
- Elisha Skorman – backing vocals
- Kimi Reichenberg – backing vocals
- Sage Mears – backing vocals
- Tiffani Fest – backing vocals

Technical

- Darrell Thorp – engineering
- Drew Brown – engineering
- Beck Hansen – production
- Bob Ludwig – mastering
- Ken Andrews – mixing
