= Modern Guilt =

Studio album by Beck
- Released: July 7, 2008
- Recorded: 2008
- Studios: Anonyme, Los Angeles
- Genres: Psychedelic rock; avant-pop; neo-psychedelia
- Length: 33:33
- Labels: DGC; XL
- Producers: Danger Mouse; Beck Hansen

Beck chronology
The Information (2006)	Modern Guilt (2008)	Morning Phase (2014)

Singles from Modern Guilt
- 1. "Chemtrails" Released: June 23, 2008; 2. "Gamma Ray" Released: August 11, 2008; 3. "Youthless" Released: December 22, 2008

Modern Guilt is the eleventh studio album by American musician Beck, released in 2008 by both DGC Records and XL Recordings. The album was produced by Beck and Danger Mouse and features two contributions by Cat Power.

== Production ==
Beck and Danger Mouse (Brian Burton) had been casual acquaintances prior to their collaboration on the album, as some of Beck's musicians had also performed with Danger Mouse's project Gnarls Barkley. Beck said, "It did help that we share a lot of musical references. We spent the first week just talking about different records. His knowledge is pretty deep, especially with some of the obscure late-Sixties, early-Seventies rock."

The original concept for the album was 10 short tracks, each around two minutes long, but Beck eventually chose to eliminate the shorter tracks. Songs began with an acoustic guitar and drumbeat and selected songs would then be embellished upon, with Burton adding keyboard bass and Beck adding other instruments. Beck described the album as the most intensive work he'd ever done: "It was like trying to fit two years of songwriting into two and a half months. ... I know I did at least 10 weeks with no days off, until four or five in the morning every night."

At 33 minutes long, the album was Beck's shortest, with only two songs lasting longer than four minutes. This was Beck's final album under the Interscope Geffen A&M Records group of companies, and he subsequently signed to Capitol Records for future releases.

== Release ==
In May 2008, it was announced that Beck would be releasing a then-untitled album in the summer. Modern Guilt was released on July 7, 2008, in the UK and Europe and on the following day in the United States. A vinyl record of the album, including download codes for the 320-kbit/s digital version of the album direct from the vinyl master, was released on July 22, 2008.

In July 2009, launching his website's new Videotheque section, Beck uploaded a series of videos comprising acoustic band performances of every song on the album, recorded earlier in the year after returning home from his tour of Japan.

== Reception ==
Professional ratings
Aggregate scores
Source	Rating
Metacritic	77/100
Review scores
Source	Rating
AllMusic	4/5 stars
The A.V. Club	B
Entertainment Weekly	B+
The Guardian	2/5 stars
The Independent	4/5 stars
Los Angeles Times	3/4 stars
Pitchfork	7.0/10
PopMatters	6/10 stars
Rolling Stone	4/5 stars
Spin	7/10

=== Critical ===
The album received generally positive reviews upon release, earning a rating of 77 out of 100 on Metacritic. Filter said of the album, "Beck is somehow more aware while puffing out his waves of broken poetry as opposed to the casual seed-spitting he has been known to turn to", while AllMusic said that it was "an effective dosage of 21st century paranoia." Some negative reviews, such as one from PopMatters, said that the album "lacks the unique resonating timbres one is accustomed to with Beck", while The Guardian called it "a vanity project".

In December 2008, Modern Guilt was nominated for Best Alternative Album at the 51st Annual Grammy Awards, but it lost to In Rainbows by Radiohead.

=== Commercial ===
The album entered both the Billboard 200 and the Canadian Albums Chart at number four, and gave Beck his first ever Top 10 placing on the UK Albums Chart, peaking at number nine. The album was also Beck's second-best charting album in Australia, reaching number 13, behind his twelfth studio album Morning Phase, which debuted and peaked at number 5 in 2014. In the US, the album sold 84,000 copies in its first week. Although successful, it did not match the first week sales of Beck's previous album, The Information (2006), which were 99,000. In Canada, the album sold over 6,000 copies in its first week.

Modern Guilt was awarded a silver certification from the Independent Music Companies Association, which indicated sales of at least 30,000 copies throughout Europe.

== Track listing ==
All songs written by Beck, except "Walls", written by Beck, Danger Mouse, Paul Guiot and Paul Piot.

1. "Orphans" – 3:15
2. "Gamma Ray" – 2:57
3. "Chemtrails" – 4:40
4. "Modern Guilt" – 3:14
5. "Youthless" – 3:00
6. "Walls" – 2:22
7. "Replica" – 3:25
8. "Soul of a Man" – 2:36
9. "Profanity Prayers" – 3:43
10. "Volcano" – 4:26

Extended version bonus tracks (UK iTunes exclusive)

11. "Vampire Voltage No. 6" – 2:20
12. "Bonfire Blondes" – 2:26
13. "Half & Half" – 2:21
14. "Necessary Evil" – 3:35
15. "Gamma Ray" (video) – 2:54
16. "Youthless" (video) – 2:51
17. "Modern Guilt" (video) – 3:14
18. "Replica" (video) – 3:24

== Personnel ==
- Beck – vocals (tracks 1–10), guitars (tracks 1–2, 4–5, 7–10), flute and percussion (1), electric piano (2, 7–8), bass guitar (4, 7–10), marimba (7), tambourine (8), slide guitar (9)
- Danger Mouse – beats (tracks 1–2, 4–7, 9–10), keyboard bass (2, 6–7), synthesizer and programming (6), sounds (8)
- Jason Falkner – bass guitar (tracks 1, 3), guitar (3)
- Brian LeBarton – synthesizer (tracks 1, 5)
- Chan Marshall – vocals (tracks 1, 6)
- Greg Kurstin – organ (track 3), piano (3–4, 7), synthesizer (5)
- Joey Waronker – drums (track 3)
- Matt Mahaffey – bass guitar (track 5)
- Larry Corbett – cello (track 5)
- Drew Brown – beat (track 8)
- David Campbell – string arrangements, conductor

Technical

- Danger Mouse – co-producer
- Beck – co-producer, album design
- Drew Brown – engineer
- Darrell Thorp – additional engineering, co-mixing (track 3)
- Kennie Takahashi – mixing
- Sam Holland, Danny Kalb, Dror Mohar, Todd Monfalcone, Wes Seidman, Seth Waldmann, Eric Weaver – assistant engineers
- Nathalie Marchand – additional assistance
- Bob Ludwig – mastering
- Drew Brown – photos, album design
- David Calderley – layout

== Accolades ==
Publication	Country	Accolade	Year	Rank
Q	UK	50 Best Albums of the Year	2008	23
Rolling Stone	US	50 Best Albums of the Year	2008	8
WERS Boston	US	50 Best Albums of the Year	2008	6

== Charts and certifications ==
=== Weekly charts ===
Chart (2008)	Peak position
Australian Albums (ARIA)	13
Austrian Albums (Ö3 Austria)	42
Belgian Albums (Ultratop Flanders)	16
Belgian Albums (Ultratop Wallonia)	46
Canadian Albums (Billboard)	4
Danish Albums (Hitlisten)	32
Dutch Albums (Album Top 100)	33
French Albums (SNEP)	45
German Albums (Offizielle Top 100)	63
New Zealand Albums (RMNZ)	21
Norwegian Albums (VG-lista)	24
Scottish Albums (Official Charts)	15
Swiss Albums (Schweizer Hitparade)	14
UK Albums (Official Charts)	9
UK Independent Albums (Official Charts)	1
US Billboard 200	4
US Top Alternative Albums (Billboard)	2
US Top Rock Albums (Billboard)	2
US Indie Store Album Sales (Billboard)	1

=== Year-end charts ===
Chart (2008)	Position
US Billboard 200	178

== Release history ==
Region	Date	Label	Format	Catalog	Ref
World	July 8, 2008	DGC	Digital download	—	
Argentina	July 8, 2008	DGC	CD	1775441	
Australia	July 8, 2008	DGC	CD	1775441	
Canada	July 8, 2008	DGC	CD	B001150702	
United States	July 8, 2008	DGC	CD	B0011507-02	
United States	July 8, 2008	DGC	LP	B0011630-01	
United Kingdom	July 7, 2008	DGC	CD	B001150702	
United Kingdom	July 7, 2008	XL	CD	XLCD369	
United Kingdom	July 7, 2008	XL	LP	XLLP 369	
Europe	July 7, 2008	XL	LP	XLLP 369	
Europe	July 7, 2008	XL	CD	XLCD369	
