= Ride Lonesome (song) =

Single by Beck

from the album Ride Lonesome
- Released: April 20, 2026
- Length: 4:33
- Label: Iliad Records/Capitol
- Songwriter: Beck
- Producer: Beck

Beck singles chronology
"Be Here Now" (2024)	"Ride Lonesome" (2026)	"In the Night" (2026)

Music video
- "Ride Lonesome" on YouTube

"Ride Lonesome" is a song written, produced and performed by the American musician Beck, released as a single alongside an announcement of a surprise tour on April 20, 2026, on Illad Records and Capitol Records.

== Composition and lyrics ==
"Ride Lonesome" is a "melancholy" track about loneliness, as Beck told NPR: "It was one of those times in your life when you’re taking things in, where you’ve been and where you’re going. You know, when you’re going through difficult things, often you have to get through it yourself. You just have to move forward through whatever landscape of your life and circumstances you find yourself in. And I think it’s sort of that dark comfort of pushing through the parts of life that are maybe not as comfortable or easy, and having some distant faith that it will pull you through to the other side."

== Release and reception ==
The single was released on April 20, 2026, to positive reviews. In a review for Consequence, Edir Flu likened it to the music of Beck's 2014 album Morning Phase, noting that it was a "welcome return for those fans turned off by the slick production and pop-leaning direction of his last two studio records". Writing for Under the Radar magazine, Mard Redfern wrote that "'Ride Lonesome' has a '70s singer/songwriter vibe more akin to his albums Sea Change and Morning Phase than his Technicolor and experimental pop fare." When asked if an album would follow, Beck confirmed he was writing a lot of other songs.

On July 15, Beck announced his fifteenth studio album of the same name, which was released on September 18, 2026, with "Ride Lonesome" functioning as the opening track.

== Music video ==
The song had a music video released that was directed by Beck and Mikai Karl.
