= The Information (Beck album) =

- Physical artwork

Studio album by Beck
- Released: October 3, 2006
- Recorded: 2003–2006
- Studios: Ocean Way (Los Angeles); Conway (Los Angeles); Sound Isadore (Los Angeles); Beck's garage (Los Angeles)
- Genres: Art pop; alternative rock; trip hop; neo-psychedelia; hip hop; pop rock; krautrock
- Length: 61:33
- Label: Interscope
- Producer: Nigel Godrich

Beck chronology
Guerolito (2005)	The Information (2006)	Modern Guilt (2008)

Alternative cover
- Digital artwork

Singles from The Information
- 1. "Nausea" Released: August 29, 2006; 2. "Cellphone's Dead" Released: October 2, 2006; 3. "Think I'm in Love" Released: 2006

The Information is the tenth studio album by American musician Beck, released on October 3, 2006 by Interscope Records. It was produced and mixed by Nigel Godrich, with whom Beck recorded Mutations (1998) and Sea Change (2002). Recording took place from 2003 to 2006, with Beck concurrently working on 2005's Guero with the Dust Brothers. The album received positive reviews from critics and made several publications' year-end lists.

== Recording ==
Before its release, Beck said the album was not a "stripped down" record, in contrast with his previous Godrich collaborations, Mutations and Sea Change. According to Beck, "Nigel [Godrich] said he wanted to do a hip-hop record" before they began work on the album. "And in a way it is, and in a way it isn't. It has hip-hop songs, and my previous work with him was Mutations and Sea Change, these sorts of introspective records, and so this new one is sort of bringing those two worlds together."

In an interview with the BBC, Beck said the album had been "painful" to make:

It started out painless, and ended up being painful. It's as if we made the album once, and we made it again, and we made it a third time. We started the record in 2003, and we got together annually, the producer [Nigel Godrich] and I. We combed over everything, and got rid of the things we were tired of, the things that seemed trite.

== Artwork ==
The album was issued with a blank sleeve and booklet and one of four different sheets of stickers for fans to make their own album art. Beck explained to Wired magazine that he wanted no two copies of the CD cover to be the same: "The artwork is going to be customizable. The idea is to provide something that calls for interactivity." However, because the album art concept was seen as a gimmick to bolster retail sales, The Information was deemed ineligible to enter the UK Albums Chart.

== Album title ==
Beck explained the album title in an NME track-by-track stating "The Information is the thing that occupies our minds, so we won't have to deal with silence which may make us think. The album was going to be called International Dreambag, but I thought it was too hippy, so at the last minute I named it after this. I generally have a rule against title tracks - I wanted to call it Colourforms, but it was trademarked."

== Promotion ==
A series of low budget videos were made for every song on the album. Beck explained the making of these videos—which would also appear on video-sharing site YouTube—to Wired:

We filmed a series of very low-budget, homemade videos for all the songs on the record. We got a bunch of cameras and a $100 video mixer off eBay and shot 15 silly, impromptu videos against a green screen. We even invited our friends and family into the studio to be a part of the action – my mother-in-law did the lighting, and my son and nieces and nephews are running around acting crazy. It was just a complete free-for-all, done on the fly. We're putting all the videos together right now with the idea of having a visual version of the record that we'll put on the Internet. I'm totally curious to see how the videos will add to the experience of listening to the album. Or maybe they'll actually detract from the experience. That would be funny.

Beck leaked tracks and videos on his web site months ahead of the album's release. "We're moving into a time when the song and the imagery and video are all able to exist as one thing," said Beck. "It's not even technically an audio thing anymore. It's something else." He also remarked, "I've been trying to do something like this for the last three albums," having released several versions of his previous album Guero (2005), including a deluxe CD/DVD package and a remix album called Guerolito (2005). "The conventional ways aren't working like they used to, so now there's a willingness to try new things."

The first single in North America was "Nausea", which was officially released to radio on September 5, 2006. The song was promoted with an official music video directed by Patrick Daughters.

The first single in the UK was "Cellphone's Dead", with an official video directed by Michel Gondry. "Think I'm in Love" went to US radio as the second and final single and became a Modern Rock and Triple A radio hit, garnering renewed interest in The Information.

== Release ==
Some copies of the album included a bonus DVD of the low budget music videos.

On February 27, 2007, a "deluxe version" of the album was released by Interscope. It included a DVD containing all of the music videos, several bonus tracks, all four sticker sheets and a disc consisting of six remixes of three songs.

== Reception ==
Professional ratings
Aggregate scores
Source	Rating
Metacritic	73/100
Review scores
Source	Rating
AllMusic	4/5 stars
The A.V. Club	A−
Entertainment Weekly	A−
The Guardian	3/5 stars
The Independent	5/5 stars
MSN Music (Consumer Guide)	B+
NME	8/10
Pitchfork	6.9/10
Rolling Stone	4/5 stars
Spin	3.5/5 stars

=== Commercial ===
The album reached number 7 on the US Billboard 200, number 6 in Canada and number 31 on Australia's ARIA Albums Chart. As of July 2008, The Information had sold 434,000 copies in the United States.

=== Critical ===
Jon Pareles of The New York Times credited the album's dark themes as a reflection of the world's condition at the time and felt that Beck had made that apparent in the videos released alongside the album. Pareles described the album's approach as being a 1960s pop-infused sound with a more driven message. Mike Driver of Drowned in Sound suggested that The Information was a mature and honest attempt at a multiple genre production without recreating what Beck had already accomplished. Driver praised Beck's variation in vocal style, ability to create a logical flow of tracks and the album's reflection of his unpredictable styles. Barry Walters of The Village Voice described Beck as being as detached on The Information as he had ever been and opined that the band was far more energetic than he. Walters noted that Beck's work with Nigel Godrich was more sample-heavy than his collaborations with the Dust Brothers had been and felt that the album ultimately suffered from Beck's disconnected approach. Nate Patrin of Pitchfork reviewed the deluxe edition of the album, which he felt was mostly a cash-in on an overlooked album, but praised the disc of remixes, which included mixes by big name performers.

Rolling Stone magazine named The Information the 24th best album of 2006, while Spin magazine ranked it number 10 on their 40 Best Albums of 2006.

Retrospectively, Sean McCarthy of PopMatters felt The Information suffered from being overly long and was Beck's least interesting album, although he praised "Think I'm in Love," "Cellphone's Dead" and the title track.

== Track listing ==
All tracks are written by Beck Hansen, except where noted.

No.	Title	Writer(s)	Length
1.	"Elevator Music"		3:38
2.	"Think I'm in Love"		3:20
3.	"Cellphone's Dead"		4:46
4.	"Strange Apparition"		3:48
5.	"Soldier Jane"	Hansen, Nigel Godrich	4:00
6.	"Nausea"		2:55
7.	"New Round"		3:26
8.	"Dark Star"		3:45
9.	"We Dance Alone"		3:56
10.	"No Complaints"		3:00
11.	"1000BPM"		2:30
12.	"Motorcade"	Hansen, Godrich	4:15
13.	"The Information"		3:46
14.	"Movie Theme"	Hansen, Godrich	3:52
15.	"The Horrible Fanfare/Landslide/Exoskeleton"	Hansen, Godrich	10:36
Total length:			61:33

Bonus tracks
No.	Title	Length
16.	"Inside Out" (box set + UK and Japanese releases)	3:43
17.	"This Girl That I Know" (box set + UK and Japanese releases)	2:43
18.	"O Menina" (box set + Japanese releases)	2:08

=== Deluxe version ===
Disc one contains the original 15-track album re-sequenced with "New Round" moved from track 7 to 14, "Dark Star" moved from track 8 to 7 and "Movie Theme" moved from track 14 to 8. The disc also includes all three Japanese bonus tracks from above for a total of 18 tracks.

Disc two – Remixes
No.	Title	Length
1.	"Cellphone's Dead" (Ellen Allien remix)	5:37
2.	"Nausea Pirates Mix" (Bumblebeez remix)	2:28
3.	"Dark Star" (David Andrew Sitek remix)	4:08
4.	"Nausea" (The Chap remix)	3:55
5.	"Cellphone's Dead" (Jamie Lidell Limited Minutes remix)	4:32
6.	"Cellphone's Dead Villalobos Entlebuch RMX" (Ricardo Villalobos remix)	14:38

The third disc contains the following music videos. Most of them homemade by Beck.

Disc three – Videos
No.	Title	Length
1.	"Elevator Music"	3:47
2.	"Think I'm in Love"	2:58
3.	"Cellphone's Dead"	5:00
4.	"Strange Apparition"	3:48
5.	"Soldier Jane"	4:06
6.	"Nausea"	2:52
7.	"New Round"	3:29
8.	"Dark Star"	6:18
9.	"We Dance Alone"	1:32
10.	"No Complaints"	2:59
11.	"1000 BPM"	2:39
12.	"Motorcade"	2:35
13.	"The Information"	4:00
14.	"Movie Theme"	4:00
15.	"The Horrible Fanfare/Landslide/Exoskeleton"	11:01
16.	"Inside Out"	4:32
17.	"This Girl That I Know"	2:57
18.	"Cellphone's Dead" (directed by Michel Gondry)	9:34
19.	"Nausea" (directed by Patrick Daughters)	4:31

== Sample credits ==
- "The Horrible Fanfare" section uses a sample of "Cellphone's Dead".
- "Landslide" section uses a sample from the song "Requiem pour un con" by the French singer Serge Gainsbourg.

== Personnel ==
- Beck – vocals, acoustic guitar, electric guitar, melodica, piano, organ, keyboards, programming, effects, scratching, sitar, bass guitar, harmonica, kalimba, percussion, drums, drum effects, glockenspiel, Game Boy
- Nigel Godrich – keyboards, programming, effects, scratching, tambourine, percussion, background vocals, Speak 'n Spell, whistle, Tote-A-Tune, kalimba, drums, Game Boy
- Jason Falkner – bass guitar, electric guitar, acoustic guitar, African bass, Moog bass, background vocals, percussion, drums
- James Gadson – drums, percussion, background vocals
- Joey Waronker – drums, percussion, background vocals
- Smokey Hormel – intro sounds
- Justin Meldal-Johnsen – intro sounds
- Roger Manning Jr. – intro sounds
- Alejandro "Alex" Acuna – percussion, background vocals
- Brian LeBarton – Speak 'n Spell
- Justin Stanley – electric guitar, acoustic guitar, background vocals, percussion, flute
- Greg Kurstin – keyboards, berimbau, piano, bass keyboard, synthesizer, background vocals, acoustic guitar
- DJ Z-Trip – scratching
- Stevie Black – cello, percussion, background vocals
- Lucia Ribisi – girl on "Cellphone's Dead"
- Cosimo Hansen – talking
- Harvey Mason – drums
- Sean Davis – bass guitar
- Rachel Shelley – shipping forecast
- Suzie Katayama – strings
- Charlie Bisharat – strings
- Joel Derouin – strings
- Charlie Bisharat – strings
- Larry Corbett – strings
- Roberto Cani – strings
- Gerardo Hilera – strings
- Natalie Leggett – strings
- Tereza Stanislaw – strings
- Josefina Vergara – strings
- Armen Garabedian – strings
- Rudolph Stein – strings
- Brianna Bell – background vocals on "The Information"
- Tiffani Fest – background vocals on "The Information"
- Sage Mears – background vocals on "The Information"
- Kimi Reichenberg – background vocals on "The Information"
- Elisha Skorman – background vocals on "The Information"
- Spike Jonze – talking on "Exoskeleton"
- Dave Eggers – talking on "Exoskeleton"

Technical

- David Campbell – string arrangements, conductor
- Nigel Godrich – producer, mixing, engineer
- Darrell Thorp – engineer
- Seth Waldman – assistant engineer
- Rouble Kapour – assistant engineer
- Chris Steffen – assistant engineer
- Zach Kasik – assistant engineer
- Bob Ludwig – mastering
- Mat Maitland – art direction, design, featured artist
- Gerard Saint – art direction
- Beck – art direction
- Jody Barton – featured artist
- Juliette Cezzar – featured artist
- Estelle & Simon – featured artist
- David Foldvari – featured artist
- Genevieve Gauckler – featured artist
- Michael Gillette – featured artist
- Jasper Goodall – featured artist
- Mercedes Helnwein – featured artist
- Han Lee – featured artist
- Ari Michelson – featured artist
- Parra – featured artist
- Melanie Pullen – featured artist
- Gay Ribisi – featured artist
- Aleksey Shirokov – featured artist
- Will Sweeney – featured artist
- Kam Tang – featured artist
- Adam Tullie – featured artist
- Kensei Yabuno – featured artist
- Vania Zouravliov – featured artist
- Greg Burne – artist coordinator
- Richard Newton – artist coordinator

== Charts ==
Chart (2006)	Peak position
Australian Albums (ARIA)	31
Austrian Albums (Ö3 Austria)	56
Belgian Albums (Ultratop Flanders)	22
Belgian Albums (Ultratop Wallonia)	50
Canadian Albums (Billboard)	6
Danish Albums (Hitlisten)	15
Dutch Albums (Album Top 100)	58
Finnish Albums (Suomen virallinen lista)	39
French Albums (SNEP)	40
German Albums (Offizielle Top 100)	78
Italian Albums (FIMI)	29
New Zealand Albums (RMNZ)	37
Norwegian Albums (VG-lista)	20
Portuguese Albums (AFP)	26
Swiss Albums (Schweizer Hitparade)	32
US Billboard 200	7
US Top Rock Albums (Billboard)	3

The United Kingdom's Official Charts Company deemed The Information ineligible to chart, as they felt its customizable sticker album art gave it "an unfair advantage" in terms of album sales.

== Certifications ==
Region	Certification	Certified units/sales
Canada (Music Canada)	Gold	50,000^{^}
United States (RIAA)	Gold	500,000^{^}
^{^} Shipments figures based on certification alone.
