= Ride Lonesome (album) =

Studio album by Beck
- Released: September 18, 2026
- Studios: Room B, United Studios (Hollywood)
- Genres: Folk rock; country folk
- Length: 47:25
- Label: Capitol
- Producer: Beck Hansen

Beck chronology
Everybody's Gotta Learn Sometime (2026)	Ride Lonesome (2026)

Singles from Ride Lonesome
- 1. "Ride Lonesome" Released: April 20, 2026; 2. "In the Night" Released: July 15, 2026; 3. "Disappearing Act" Released: August 19, 2026

Ride Lonesome is the fifteenth studio album by the American musician Beck. It was released September 18, 2026 via Capitol Records. It is the first studio album Beck has released since the 2019 release of Hyperspace, marking his longest gap between studio albums.

== Background ==
In April 2025, Beck said he was working on an orchestral album after performing a two night residency at the Royal Albert Hall in London. On January 29, 2026, Beck released the compilation album Everybody's Gotta Learn Sometime that featured covers and rarities.

The lead single and title track, "Ride Lonesome", was released on April 20, 2026, alongside a music video and the announcement of a tour of the United States and Canada kicking off on September 22 in Santa Barbara and concluding on November 10 in Portland. A version of the single featuring Sierra Ferrell released on June 26.

On July 15, 2026, Beck fully announced the album and released the second single, "In the Night", along with a music video featuring Denis Lavant.

The third single was "Disappearing Act", which was released on August 19, 2026.

== Writing and recording ==
Ride Lonesome was recorded in Room B at United Studios in Hollywood with Beck reuniting with musicians who had previously played on his albums Mutations (1998), Sea Change (2002), and Morning Phase (2014). They include Smokey Hormel, Joey Waronker, Justin Meldal-Johnsen, Roger Joseph Manning Jr. and Jason Falkner. Beck said the return to United Studios fostered "a sound that's come together over the decades of working together" and that, despite its familiarity, the band could still find "new sounds and emotional textures" in the collaborative process. The album was produced by Beck and mixed by Nigel Godrich.

== Critical reception ==
Professional ratings
Aggregate scores
Source	Rating
Any Decent Music	7.8/10
Metacritic	83/100
Review scores
Source	Rating
AllMusic	3.5/5 stars
Clash	8/10
DIY	4.5/5 stars
Exclaim!	8/10
The Guardian	5/5 stars
Mojo	5/5 stars
Morning Star	4/5 stars
NME	4.5/5 stars
Pitchfork	6.0/10
Rolling Stone	4/5 stars
Slant	3.5/5 stars

Ride Lonesome received critical acclaim. Any Decent Music gave the album a weighted average score of 7.8 out of 10 from twenty-four critic scores. According to Metacritic, it received "universal acclaim" based on a weighted average score of 83 out of 100 from seventeen critic scores.

Ian Sinclair wrote a review for British newspaper Morning Star, calling the album "another exquisitely crafted set of emotional desolation".

== Track listing ==
All tracks are written by Beck Hansen; "If You Don't Know What Love Is" written with Eli Reuben Hirsch.

No.	Title	Length
1.	"Ride Lonesome"	4:27
2.	"Run Away"	3:39
3.	"In the Night"	2:58
4.	"Failed Words"	3:32
5.	"Bleed"	3:17
6.	"Disappearing Act"	2:59
7.	"For Your Love"	3:24
8.	"Slow Canyon"	4:22
9.	"It Ends Right Here"	2:56
10.	"Falling Through My Hands"	4:33
11.	"If You Don't Know What Love Is"	5:45
12.	"Beyond the Light"	5:33
Total length:		47:25

== Personnel ==
Credits are adapted from Tidal.

=== Musicians ===
- Beck Hansen – vocals (all tracks), background vocals (tracks 1, 4, 11, 12), guitar (1, 10), acoustic guitar (2–6, 8, 9, 11, 12), synthesizer (2–5, 9, 10, 12), piano (2, 4, 11), glockenspiel (2), bass guitar (3), electric guitar (9, 11, 12), harmonica (10, 11), keyboards (12)
- Roger Joseph Manning Jr. – background vocals (1, 4, 6, 11, 12), keyboards (1), piano (2, 4, 5, 8, 10), synthesizer (2, 4, 6, 88, 10), organ (10–12)
- Justin Meldal-Johnsen – bass guitar (1, 2, 4, 6, 8, 10–12)
- Smokey Hormel – guitar (1), electric guitar (2, 5, 11), slide guitar (6, 8, 12), acoustic guitar (6)
- Joey Waronker – drums (1, 2, 6, 8, 10–12), percussion (8)
- Jason Falkner – guitar (1, 10), electric guitar (4, 9, 11); piano, synthesizer (10); background vocals (11)
- Stephanie Bennett – harp (2)
- Blake Mills – acoustic guitar (3)
- Charlie Tyler – cello (3, 5, 7, 9, 12)
- Jacob Braun – cello (3, 5, 7, 9, 12)
- Paula Hochalter – cello (3, 5, 7, 9, 12)
- Allen Fogle – horn (3, 5, 7, 9, 12)
- Danielle Ondarza – horn (3, 5, 7, 9, 12)
- Alma Fernandez – viola (3, 5, 7, 9, 12)
- Linnea Powell – viola (3, 5, 7, 9, 12)
- Luke Maurer – viola (3, 5, 7, 9, 12)
- Carrie Kennedy – violin (3, 5, 7, 9, 12)
- Charlie Bisharat – violin (3, 5, 7, 9, 12)
- Jessica Guideri – violin (3, 5, 7, 9, 12)
- Joel Pargman – violin (3, 5, 7, 9, 12)
- Josefina Vergara – violin (3, 5, 7, 9, 12)
- Luanne Homzy – violin (3, 5, 7, 9, 12)
- Sara Parkins – violin (3, 5, 7, 9, 12)
- Tammy Hatwan – violin (3, 5, 7, 9, 12)
- Thomas Harte – upright bass (3, 5, 7, 9, 12)
- Stanley Clarke – upright bass (3)
- David Greenbaum – synthesizer (4, 5)
- Eric Byers – cello (7, 8)
- Jonathan Moerschel – viola (7, 8)
- Benjamin Jacobson – viola (7, 8)
- Tereza Stanislav – viola (7, 8)
- Geoff Nudell – bass clarinet (8, 10, 12)
- Joshua Ranz – clarinet (8, 10, 12)
- Ted Sugata – English horn, oboe (8, 10)
- Steve Kujala – flute (8), alto flute (10)
- Greg Leisz – pedal steel guitar (11)
- Abe Laboriel Jr. – Drums (8, 5)

=== Technical ===
- Beck – production
- David Greenbaum – engineering
- Erik Brauer – engineering
- Dylan Sky – engineering (3–6, 8, 10, 12)
- Darrell Thorp – engineering (4, 6–8, 12)
- Nigel Godrich – mixing
- Paul Hicks – mastering

== Charts ==
Chart performance for Ride Lonesome
Chart (2026)	Peak position
Australian Albums (ARIA)	33
Austrian Albums (Ö3 Austria)	54
Belgian Albums (Ultratop Flanders)	10
Belgian Albums (Ultratop Wallonia)	10
Croatian International Albums (HDU)	34
Danish Vinyl Albums (Hitlisten)	3
Dutch Albums (Album Top 100)	18
French Albums (SNEP)	94
French Rock & Metal Albums (SNEP)	5
German Albums (Offizielle Top 100)	36
German Rock & Metal Albums (Offizielle Top 100)	13
Irish Albums (IRMA)	55
Japanese Albums (Oricon)	45
Japanese Download Albums (Billboard Japan)	32
New Zealand Albums (RMNZ)	26
Portuguese Albums (AFP)	184
Scottish Albums (Official Charts)	4
Swiss Albums (Schweizer Hitparade)	6
UK Albums (Official Charts)	15
US Billboard 200	67
US Top Rock & Alternative Albums (Billboard)	18
US Top Album Sales (Billboard)	11
Indie Stores Album Sales (Billboard)	2
