= Beck =

American musician (born 1970)

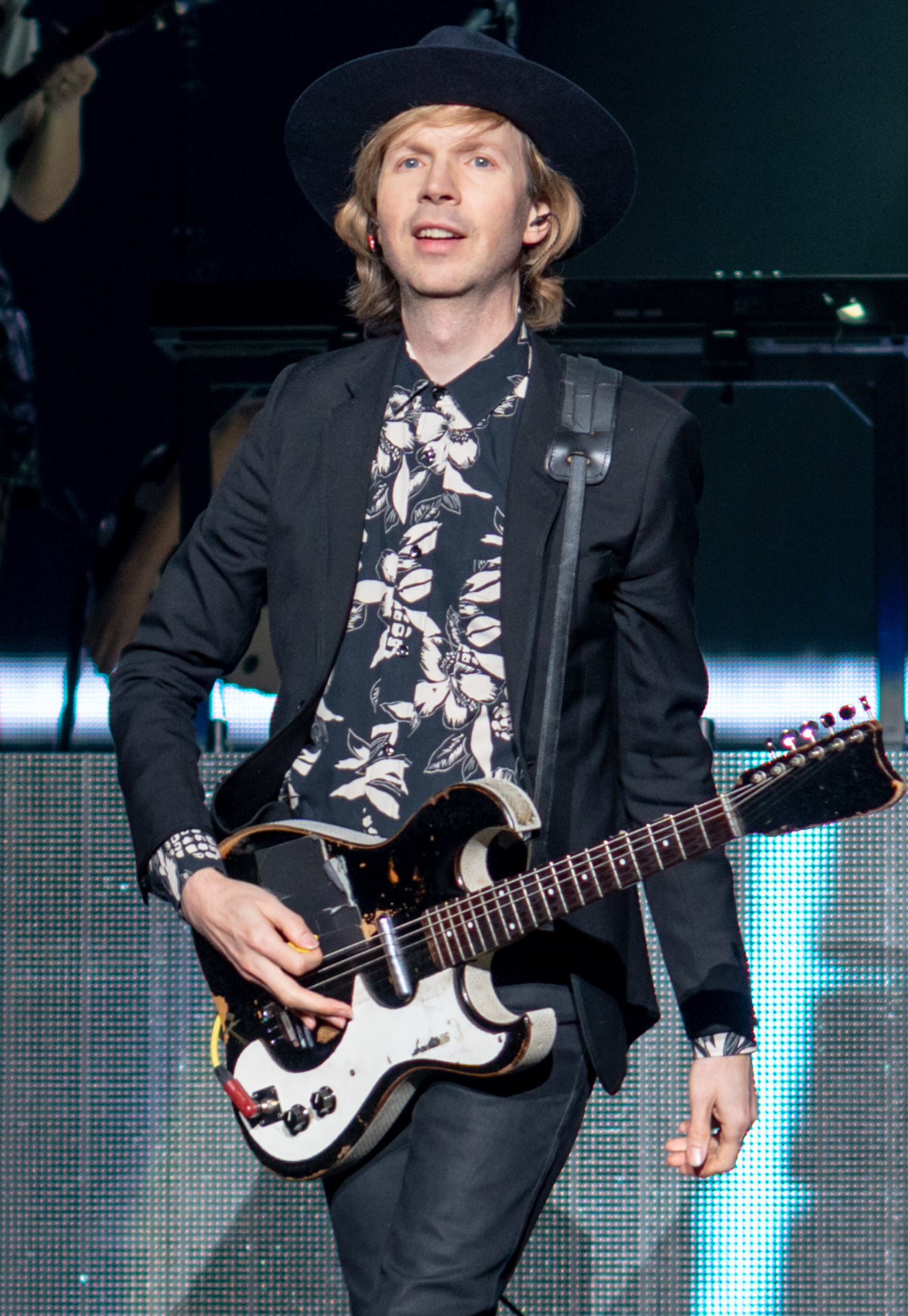
- Beck in 2018
- Born: Bek David Campbell; July 8, 1970 (age 56); Los Angeles, California, U.S.
- Occupations: Musician; singer; songwriter; record producer
- Years active: 1988–present
- Spouse: Marissa Ribisi (m. 2004; div. 2021)
- Children: 2
- Parents: David Campbell (father); Bibbe Hansen (mother)
- Relatives: Al Hansen (grandfather)
- Awards: Full list
- Musical career
- Genres: Alternative rock; folk rock; psychedelia; electronic; alt-country; lo-fi (early)
- Instruments: Vocals; guitar; bass guitar; keyboards; harmonica
- Works: Beck discography
- Labels: DGC; Interscope; Bong Load; Fonograf; Capitol; K; Sonic Enemy
- Website: beck.com

Beck David Hansen (born Bek David Campbell; July 8, 1970), known mononymously as Beck, is an American singer, songwriter, and record producer. He rose to fame in the early 1990s with his experimental and lo-fi style, and became known for creating musical collages of wide-ranging genres. He has musically encompassed folk, funk, soul, hip-hop, electronica, alternative rock, country, and psychedelia. He has released 15 studio albums, as well as several non-album singles and a book of sheet music.

Born and raised in Los Angeles, Beck gravitated towards hip-hop and folk in his teens and began to perform locally at coffeehouses and clubs. He moved to New York City in 1989 and became involved in the city's anti-folk movement. Returning to Los Angeles in the early 1990s, he saw his commercial breakthrough with his 1993 single "Loser". After signing with DGC Records, the song peaked at number ten on the Billboard Hot 100 and served as the lead single for his third album and major label debut, Mellow Gold (1994). Its follow-up, Odelay (1996), topped critic polls and won several awards. Before his 1996 release, the same year, he played the role of a taxi driver in the US video of Alisha's Attic's single, "I Am, I Feel".

Beck released the country-influenced Mutations in 1998, and the funk-infused Midnite Vultures in 1999. The soft-acoustic Sea Change in 2002 showcased a more serious Beck, and 2005's Guero returned to Odelay's sample-based production. The Information in 2006 was inspired by electro-funk, hip-hop, and psychedelia; 2008's Modern Guilt was inspired by 1960s pop; and 2014's folk-infused Morning Phase, a stylistic and thematic follow-up to Sea Change, won Album of the Year at the 57th Grammy Awards. His 2017 album, Colors, won awards for Best Alternative Music Album and Best Engineered Album, Non-Classical at the 61st Annual Grammy Awards. His fourteenth studio album, Hyperspace, was released on November 22, 2019. In 2022, Beck was nominated for the Rock & Roll Hall of Fame. In 2026, he released his fifteenth studio album, Ride Lonesome, which saw him return to the series of Sea Change and Morning Phase.

With a pop art collage of musical styles, oblique and ironic lyrics, and postmodern arrangements incorporating samples, drum machines, live instrumentation, and sound effects, Beck has been hailed by critics and the public throughout his musical career as being among the most idiosyncratically creative musicians of the 1990s and 2000s alternative rock. Two of Beck's most popular and acclaimed recordings are Odelay and Sea Change, both of which were ranked on Rolling Stone's list of the 500 greatest albums of all time. Beck is a four-time platinum artist; he has collaborated with several artists and contributed to several soundtracks.

== Early life ==
Bek David Campbell was born in Los Angeles on July 8, 1970, the son of American visual artist Bibbe Hansen and Canadian arranger, composer, and conductor David Campbell. Bibbe Hansen grew up amid Andy Warhol's The Factory art scene of the 1960s in New York City and was a Warhol superstar. She moved to California at 17 and met David Campbell. Beck's maternal grandfather, artist Al Hansen, was of Norwegian descent and was a pioneer in the avant-garde Fluxus movement. Beck's maternal grandmother was Jewish; he has said that he considers himself Jewish because he was "raised celebrating Jewish holidays."

Beck was born in a rooming house near downtown Los Angeles. As a child he lived in a declining neighborhood near Hollywood Boulevard. He remembers "By the time we left there, they were ripping out miles of houses en masse and building low-rent, giant apartment blocks." The working-class family struggled financially, moving to Hoover and Ninth Street, a neighborhood populated primarily by Koreans and Salvadorian refugees. He was sent for a time to live with his paternal grandparents in Kansas; he later remarked that he thought "they were kind of concerned" about his "weird" home life. Because his paternal grandfather was a Presbyterian minister, Beck grew up influenced by church music and hymns. He also spent time in Europe with his maternal grandfather.

After his parents separated when he was ten, Beck stayed with his mother and brother Channing in Los Angeles, where he was influenced by the city's diverse musical offerings—everything from hip-hop to Latin music and his mother's art scene—all of which would later reappear in his work. Beck obtained his first guitar at 16 and became a street musician, often playing Lead Belly covers at Lafayette Park. During his teens, Beck discovered the music of Sonic Youth, Pussy Galore, and X, but remained uninterested in most music outside the folk genre until many years into his career. The first contemporary music that made a direct connection with Beck was hip-hop, which he first heard on Grandmaster Flash records in the early 1980s. Growing up in a predominantly Latin district, he found himself the only white child at his school, and quickly learned how to breakdance. When he was 17, Beck grew fascinated after hearing a Mississippi John Hurt record at a friend's house, and spent hours in his room trying to emulate Hurt's finger-picking techniques. Shortly thereafter Beck explored blues and folk music further, discovering Woody Guthrie and Blind Willie Johnson.

Feeling like "a total outcast", Beck dropped out of school after junior high. He later said that although he felt school was important, he felt unsafe there. When he applied to the new performing arts high school downtown, he was rejected. His brother took him to post-Beat jazz places in Echo Park and Silver Lake. He hung out at Los Angeles City College perusing records, books, and old sheet music in the college's library. He used a fake ID to sit in on classes there, and he also befriended a literature instructor and his poet wife. He worked at a string of odd jobs, including loading trucks and operating a leaf blower.

== Career ==
=== Early performances and first releases (1988–1993) ===
Beck began as a folk musician, switching between country blues, Delta blues, and more traditional rural folk music in his teenage years. He began performing on city buses, often covering Mississippi John Hurt alongside original, sometimes improvisational compositions. "I'd get on the bus and start playing Mississippi John Hurt with totally improvised lyrics. Some drunk would start yelling at me, calling me Axl Rose. So I'd start singing about Axl Rose and the levee and bus passes and strychnine, mixing the whole thing up", he later recalled. He was also in a band called Youthless that hosted Dadaist-inspired freeform events at city coffee shops. "We had Radio Shack mics and this homemade speaker and we'd draft people in the audience to recite comic books or do a beatbox thing, or we'd tie the whole audience up in masking tape," Beck recalled.

In 1989, Beck caught a bus to New York City with little more than $8.00 and a guitar. He spent the summer attempting to find a job and a place to live with little success. Beck eventually began to frequent Manhattan's Lower East Side, where he became involved in the anti-folk scene at the Chameleon Club organized by Lach, the movement's founder. "The whole mission was to destroy all the clichés and make up some new ones," said Beck of his New York years. "Everybody knew each other. You could go up onstage and say anything, and you wouldn't feel weird or feel any pressure." During this period, Lach encouraged Beck to write his own songs about whatever was happening around him, "If a weird looking dog walks by, and you're hungry for pizza, write a song about that." Beck was roommates with Paleface, sleeping on his couch and attending open mic nights together. Daunted by the prospect of another homeless New York winter, Beck returned to his home of Los Angeles in early 1991. "I was tired of being cold, tired of getting beat up," he later remarked. "It was hard to be in New York with no money, no place ... I kinda used up all the friends I had. Everyone on the scene got sick of me."

Back in Los Angeles, Beck began to work at a video store in the Silver Lake neighborhood, "doing things like alphabetizing the pornography section". He began performing in arthouse clubs and coffeehouses such as Al's Bar and Raji's. In order to keep indifferent audiences engaged in his music, Beck would play in a spontaneous, joking manner. "I'd be banging away on a Son House tune and the whole audience would be talking. So maybe out of desperation or boredom, or the audience's boredom, I'd make up these ridiculous songs just to see if people were listening," he later remarked. Virtually an unknown to the public and an enigma to those who met him, Beck would hop onstage between acts in local clubs and play "strange folk songs", accompanied by "what could best be described as performance art" while sometimes wearing a Star Wars stormtrooper mask. Beck met someone who offered to help record demos in his living room, and he began to pass cassette tapes around.

Eventually, Beck gained key boosters in Margaret Mittleman, the West Coast's director of talent acquisitions for BMG Music Publishing, and the partners behind independent record label Bong Load Custom Records: Tom Rothrock, Rob Schnapf, and Brad Lambert. Schnapf saw Beck perform at Jabberjaw and felt he would suit their small venture. Beck expressed a loose interest in hip-hop and Rothrock introduced him to Carl Stephenson, a record producer for Rap-A-Lot Records. In 1992, Beck visited Stephenson's home to collaborate with him. The result—the slide-sampling hip-hop track "Loser"—was a one-off experiment that Beck set aside, going back to his folk songs, making his home tapes such as Golden Feelings, and releasing several independent singles.

=== Mellow Gold, and independent albums (1993–1994) ===
By 1993, Beck was living in a rat-infested shed near a Los Angeles alleyway with little money. Bong Load issued "Loser" as a single in March 1993 on 12" vinyl with only 500 copies pressed. Beck felt that "Loser" was mediocre, and only agreed to its release at Rothrock's insistence. "Loser" unexpectedly received radio airplay, starting in Los Angeles, where college radio station KXLU was the first to play it, and later on Santa Monica College radio station KCRW, where radio host Chris Douridas played the song on Morning Becomes Eclectic, the station's flagship music program. "I called the record label that day and asked to have Beck play live on the air", Douridas said. "He came in that Friday, rapped to a tape of 'Loser' and did his song 'MTV Makes Me Want to Smoke Crack.'" That night, Beck performed at the Los Angeles club Cafe Troy to a packed audience and talent scouts from major labels. The song then spread to Seattle through KNDD The End, and KROQ-FM began playing the song on an almost hourly basis. As Bong Load struggled to press more copies of "Loser", Beck was beset with offers to sign with major labels. During the bidding war in November, Beck spent several days in Olympia, Washington, recording material with Calvin Johnson of Beat Happening, which would later see release the following year on Johnson's K Records as One Foot in the Grave.

A fierce bidding war ensued, with Geffen Records A&R director Mark Kates signing Beck in December 1993 amid intense competition from Warner Bros. and Capitol. Beck's non-exclusive contract with Geffen allowed him an unusual amount of creative freedom, with Beck remaining free to release material through such small, independent labels as Flipside, which issued the sprawling, 25-track collection of pre-"Loser" recordings titled Stereopathetic Soulmanure on February 22 the following year. By the time Beck released his first album for Geffen, the low-budget, genre-blending Mellow Gold on March 1, "Loser" was already in the top 40 and its video in MTV's Buzz Bin. "Loser" quickly ascended the charts in the U.S., reaching a peak of number ten on the Billboard Hot 100 singles chart and topping the Modern Rock Tracks chart. The song also charted in the UK, Australia, New Zealand, and throughout Europe. Beck's newfound position of attention led to his characterization as the "King of Slackers", as the media dubbed him the center of the new so-called "slacker" movement. Critics, feeling it the essential follow-up to Radiohead's "Creep", found vacantness in the lyrics of "Loser" strongly associated with Generation X, although Beck himself strongly contested his position as the face of the "slacker" generation: "Slacker my ass. I mean, I never had any slack. I was working a $4-an-hour job trying to stay alive. That slacker stuff is for people who have the time to be depressed about everything."

=== Backlash and Odelay (1994–1997) ===
Feeling as though he was "constantly trying to prove myself", Beck suffered a backlash, with skeptics denouncing him as a self-indulgent fake and the latest marketing opportunity. In the summer of 1994, Beck was struggling and many of his fellow musicians thought he had lost his way. Combined with "Loser"'s wildly popular music video and the world tour, Beck reacted believing the attention could not last, resulting in a status as a "one-hit wonder". At other concerts, crowds were treated to twenty minutes of reggae or Miles Davis or jazz-punk iterations of "Loser". At one-day festivals in California, he surrounded himself with an artnoise combo. The drummer set fire to his cymbals; the lead guitarist "played" his guitar with the strings faced towards his body; and Beck changed the words to "Loser" so that nobody could sing along. "I can't tell you how many times I was looking at faces that were looking back at me with complete bewilderment—or just pointing and shaking their heads and laughing—while performing during that period," he later recalled. Despite this, Beck gained the respect of his peers, such as Tom Petty and Johnny Cash, and created an entire wave of bands determined to recapture the Mellow Gold sound. Feeling his previous releases were just collections of demos recorded over the course of several years, Beck desired to enter the studio and record an album in a continuous linear fashion, which became Odelay.

Beck blends country, blues, rap, jazz and rock on Odelay, the result of a year and half of feverish "cutting, pasting, layering, dubbing, and, of course, sampling". Each day, the musicians started from scratch, often working on songs for 16 hours straight. Odelay's conception lies in an unfinished studio album Beck first embarked on following the success of "Loser", chronicling the difficult time he experienced: "There was a cycle of everyone dying around me," he recalled later. He was constantly recording, and eventually put together an album of somber, orchestrated folk tunes; one that, perhaps, "could have been a commercial blockbuster along with similarly themed work by Smashing Pumpkins, Nine Inch Nails and Nirvana". Instead, Beck plucked one song from it—the Odelay album closer "Ramshackle"—and shelved the rest ("Brother" and "Feather In Your Cap" were, however, later released as B-sides). Beck was introduced to the Dust Brothers, producers of the Beastie Boys' album Paul's Boutique, whose cut-and-paste, sample-heavy production suited Beck's vision of a more fun, accessible album. After a record executive explained that Odelay would be a "huge mistake", he spent many months thinking "that I'd blown it forever".

Odelay was released on June 18, 1996, to commercial success and critical acclaim. The record produced several hit singles including "Where It's At", "Devils Haircut", and "The New Pollution", and was nominated for the Grammy Award for Album of the Year in 1997, winning a Grammy Award for Best Alternative Music Album as well as a Grammy Award for Best Male Rock Vocal Performance for "Where It's At". During one busy week in January 1997, he landed his Grammy nominations, appeared on Saturday Night Live and Howard Stern, and did a last-minute trot on The Rosie O'Donnell Show. The combined buzz gave Odelay a second wind, leading to an expanded fan base and additional exposure Beck enjoyed but, like several executives at Geffen, was bewildered by the success of Odelay. He would often get recognized in public, which made him feel strange. "It's just weird. It doesn't feel right. It doesn't feel natural to me. I don't think I was made for that. I was never good at that," he later told Pitchfork. Odelay sold two million copies and put "one-hit wonder" criticisms to rest. During this time, he contributed the song "Deadweight" to the soundtrack of the film A Life Less Ordinary (1997).

=== Mutations and Midnite Vultures (1998–2001) ===
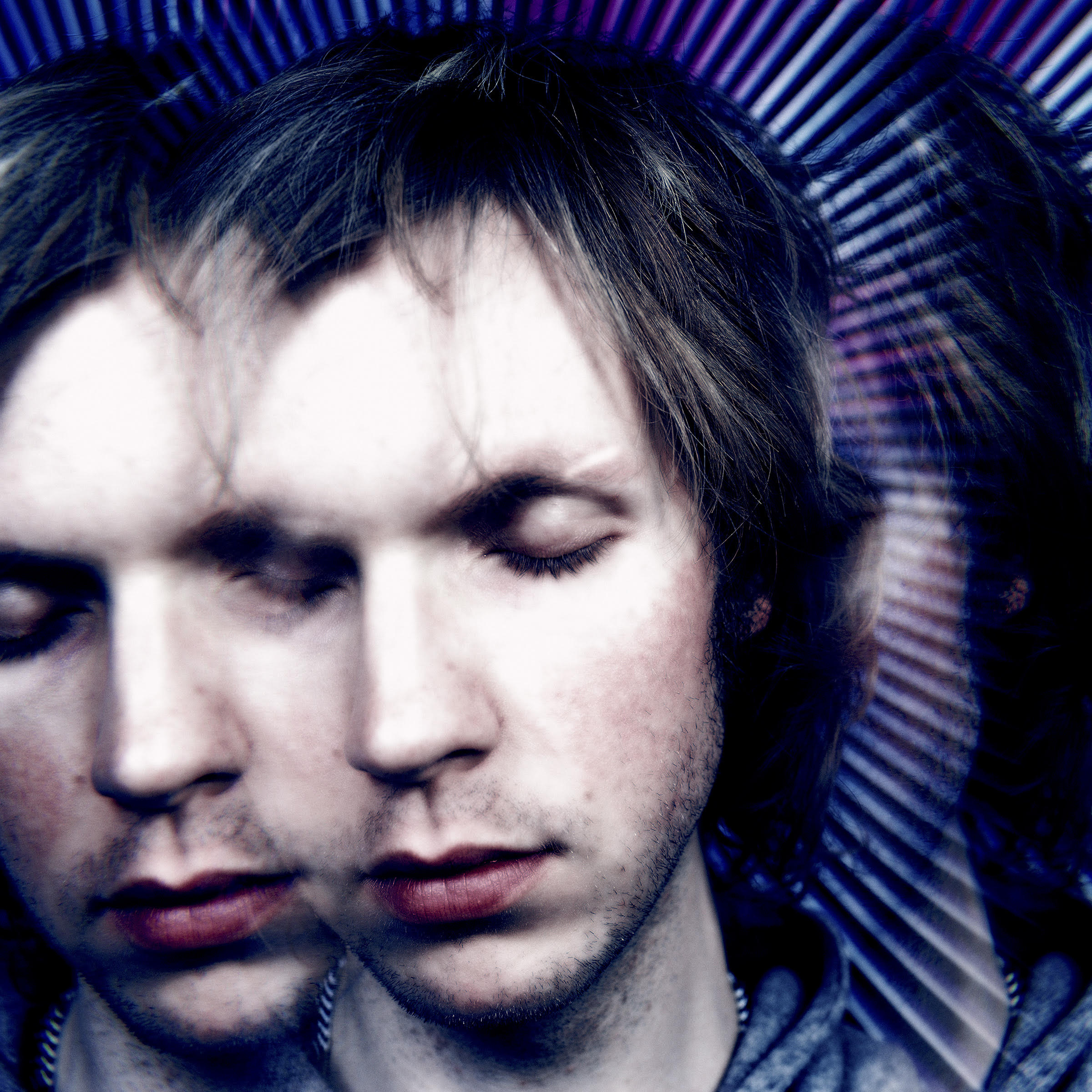
Beck in Hamburg, 2000

Having not been in a proper studio since "Deadweight", Beck felt anxious to "go in and just do some stuff real quick", and compiled several songs he had had for years. Beck and his bandmates wrote songs in fourteen days, although just twelve made it onto the album, 1998's Mutations. Beck hired the producer Nigel Godrich, who had produced Radiohead's 1997 album OK Computer. Godrich was leaving the United States for England in a short time, which led to the album's quick production schedule—"No looking back, no doctoring anything." The whole point of the record was to capture the performance of the musicians live, an uncharacteristic far-cry from the cut-and-paste aesthetic of Odelay. Though the album was originally slated for release by Bong Load Records, Geffen intervened and issued the record against Beck's wishes. The artist then sought to void his contracts with both record labels, and in turn the labels sued him for breach of contract. The litigation went on for years and it remains unclear to this day if it has ever been completely resolved. Beck was later awarded Best Alternative Music Performance for Mutations at the 42nd Grammy Awards.

Midnite Vultures, Beck's next studio effort, was originally recorded as a double album, and more than 25 nearly completed songs were left behind. In the studio, Beck and producers studied contemporary hip-hop and R&B, specifically R. Kelly, in order to embrace and incorporate those influences in the way Al Green and Stax records had done in previous decades. In July 1998, a core group began to assemble at Beck's Pasadena home: bassist Justin Meldal-Johnsen, keyboardist Roger Joseph Manning Jr., and producer-engineers Mickey Petralia and Tony Hoffer. Dozens of session players passed through including Beck's father, David Campbell, who played viola and arranged some of the strings. The musicians held communal meals and mountain-bike rides on dusty trails nearby, but remained focused on Beck's instructions: to make an up-tempo album that would be fun to play on tour night after night. "I had so many things going on", said Beck of the recording process. "I had a couple of rooms of computers hooked up, I was doing B sides for Japan, I was programming beats in one room and someone would be cooking dinner in the other room." In November 1999, Geffen released the much-anticipated Midnite Vultures, which attracted confusion: "fans and critics misguidedly worried whether it was serious or a goof," and as a result, The New York Times wrote that the album "never won the audience it deserved". The record was supported by an extensive world tour. For Beck, it was a return to the high-energy performances that had been his trademark as far back as Lollapalooza. The live stage set included a red bed that descended from the ceiling for the song "Debra", and the touring band was complemented by a brass section. Midnite Vultures was nominated for Best Album at the 43rd Annual Grammy Awards.

=== Sea Change (2002–2003) ===
In 2000, Beck and his fiancée, stylist Leigh Limon, ended their nine-year relationship. Beck lapsed into a period of melancholy and introspection, during which he wrote the bleak, acoustic-based tracks later found on Sea Change. Beck sat on the songs, not wanting to talk about his personal life; he later said that he wanted to focus on music and "not really strew my baggage across the public lobby". Eventually, however, he decided the songs spoke to a common experience, and that it would not seem self-indulgent to record them. In 2001, Beck drifted back to the songs and called Godrich.

Retailers initially predicted that the album would not receive much radio support, but they also believed that Beck's maverick reputation and critical acclaim, in addition to the possibility of multiple Grammy nominations, might offset Sea Change's noncommercial sound. Sea Change, issued by Geffen in September 2002, was regardless a commercial hit and critical darling, with Rolling Stone revering it as "the best album Beck has ever made ... an impeccable album of truth and light from the end of love. This is his Blood on the Tracks." The album was later listed by the magazine as one of the best records of the decade and of all time, and it also placed second on the year's Pazz & Jop Critics Poll. Sea Change yielded a low-key, theater-based acoustic tour, as well as a larger tour with the Flaming Lips as Beck's opening and backing band. Beck was playful and energetic, sometimes throwing in covers of the Rolling Stones, Big Star, the Zombies and the Velvet Underground.

Following the release of Sea Change, Beck felt newer compositions were sketches for something more evolved in the same direction, and wrote nearly 35 more songs in the coming months, keeping demos of them on tapes in a suitcase. During his solo tour, the tapes were left backstage during a stop in Washington, D.C., and Beck was never able to recover them. It was disheartening to the musician, who felt the two years of songwriting represented something more technically complex. As a result, Beck took a break and wrote no original compositions in 2003. Feeling as though it might take him a while to "get back to that [songwriting] territory", he entered the studio with Dust Brothers to complete a project that dated back to Odelay. Nearly half of the songs had existed since the 1990s.

=== Guero and The Information (2004–2007) ===
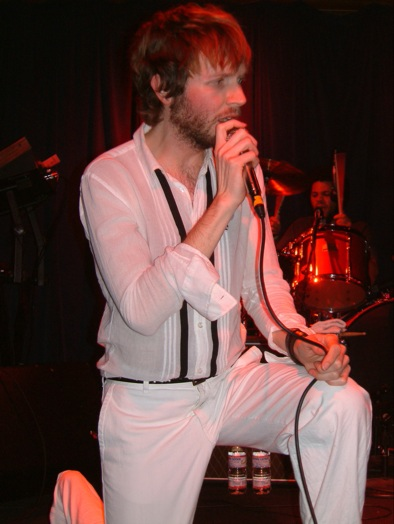
Beck in 2005

Guero, Beck's ninth studio album, was recorded over the span of nine months during which several significant events occurred in his life: his girlfriend, Marissa Ribisi, became pregnant; they were married; their son, Cosimo, was born; and they moved out of Silver Lake. The collaboration with the Dust Brothers, his second, was notable for their use of high-tech measures to achieve a lo-fi sound. For example, after recording a "sonically perfect" version of a song at one of the nicest recording studios in Hollywood, the Dust Brothers processed it in an Echoplex to create a gritty, reverb-heavy sound: "We did this high-tech recording and ran it through a transistor radio. It sounded too good, that was the problem." Initially due to be released in October 2004, Guero faced delays and did not come out until March 2005, though unmastered copies of the tracks surfaced online in January.

Guero debuted at number two on the Billboard 200, selling 162,000 copies, an all-time sales high. Lead single "E-Pro" peaked at number one at Modern Rock radio, making it his first chart-topper since "Loser". Beck, inspired by the Nintendocore remix scene and feeling a connection with its lo-fi, home-recording method, collaborated with artists 8-Bit and Paza on Hell Yes, an EP issued in February 2005. In December 2005, Geffen also issued Guerolito, a fully reworked version of Guero featuring remixes by the Beastie Boys' Ad-Rock, the Dust Brothers' John King and Scottish electronic duo Boards of Canada. Guerolito combines remixes previously heard as B-sides and new versions of album tracks to make a track-by-track reconfiguration of the album. Also released in 2005 was A Brief Overview, a 12-track promotional-only "History of Beck" compilation CD sampler that featured a combination of older and newer Beck tracks.

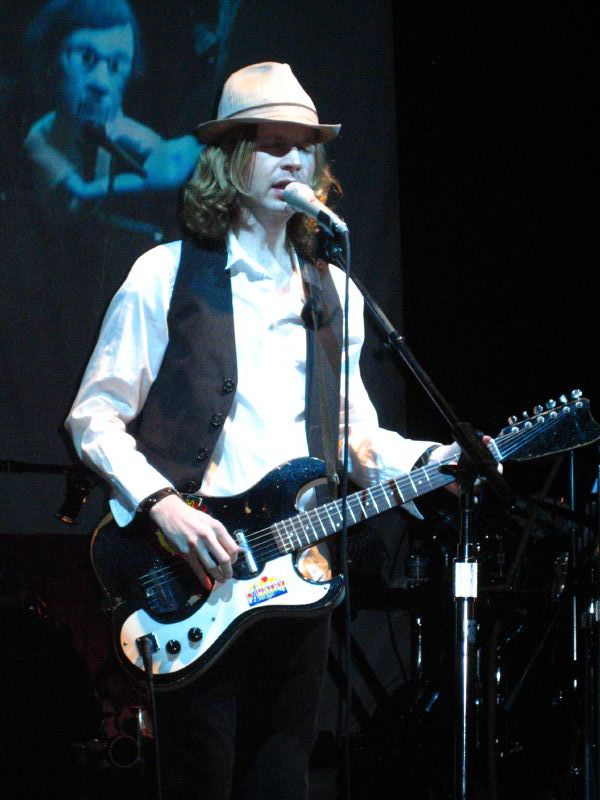
Beck in 2006

The Information, Beck's tenth studio album, began production around the same time as Guero, in 2003. Working again with Godrich, Beck built a studio in his garden, where they wrote many of the tracks. "The idea was to get people in a room together recording live, hitting bad notes and screaming," said Beck, adding that the album is best described as "introspective hip hop". Beck described the recording process as "painful", noting that he edited down songs constantly and he perhaps recorded the album three times. For the release, Beck was allowed for the first time to fulfill a long-running wish for an unconventional rollout: he made low-budget videos to accompany each song, packaged the CD with sheets of stickers so buyers could customize the cover, and leaked tracks and videos on his website months ahead of the album's release. Digital download releases automatically downloaded the song's additional video for each single sale, and physical copies came bundled with an additional DVD featuring fifteen videos.

=== Modern Guilt, production work, Record Club and Song Reader (2008–2013) ===
In 2007, Beck released the single "Timebomb", which was nominated for a Grammy Award for Best Solo Rock Vocal Performance. For his next studio effort, his eleventh, Beck tapped Danger Mouse to produce, and the two first met in December 2007 to record. The duo knocked out two tracks in two days, but the notion that the album would be finished in a timely fashion soon evaporated. Beck had known Danger Mouse casually before, as many of his former musicians ended up working with Danger Mouse's side project, Gnarls Barkley. Still, the musicians were surprised at how well they got along. Following the grueling recording schedule, Beck was exhausted, calling it "the most intense work I've ever done on anything", relating that he "did at least 10 weeks with no days off, until four or five in the morning every night." Beck's original vision was a short 10-track burst with two-minute songs, but the songs gradually grew as he fit 'two years of songwriting into two and a half months." Modern Guilt (2008) was "full of off-kilter rhythms and left-field breakdowns, with an overall 1960s vibe."

Modern Guilt was the final release in Beck's contract with Geffen Records. Beck, then 38, had held the contract since his early 20s. Released from his label contract and going independent, Beck began working more heavily on his own seven-year-old label, which went through a variety of names. He focused on smaller, more quixotic projects, and moonlighted as a producer, working with artists such as Charlotte Gainsbourg, Thurston Moore and Stephen Malkmus. Beck worked for five or six days a week at the small studio on his property in Malibu, and founded Record Club, a project whereby an entire classic album—by the Velvet Underground, Leonard Cohen, INXS, Yanni—would be covered by another singer in the span of a single day. Beck provided four songs for the film Scott Pilgrim vs. the World (2010), each attributed to the title character's fictional band, Sex Bob-Omb. Beck also collaborated with Philip Glass, Jack White, Tobacco of Black Moth Super Rainbow, Jamie Lidell, Seu Jorge, Childish Gambino, and The Lonely Island.

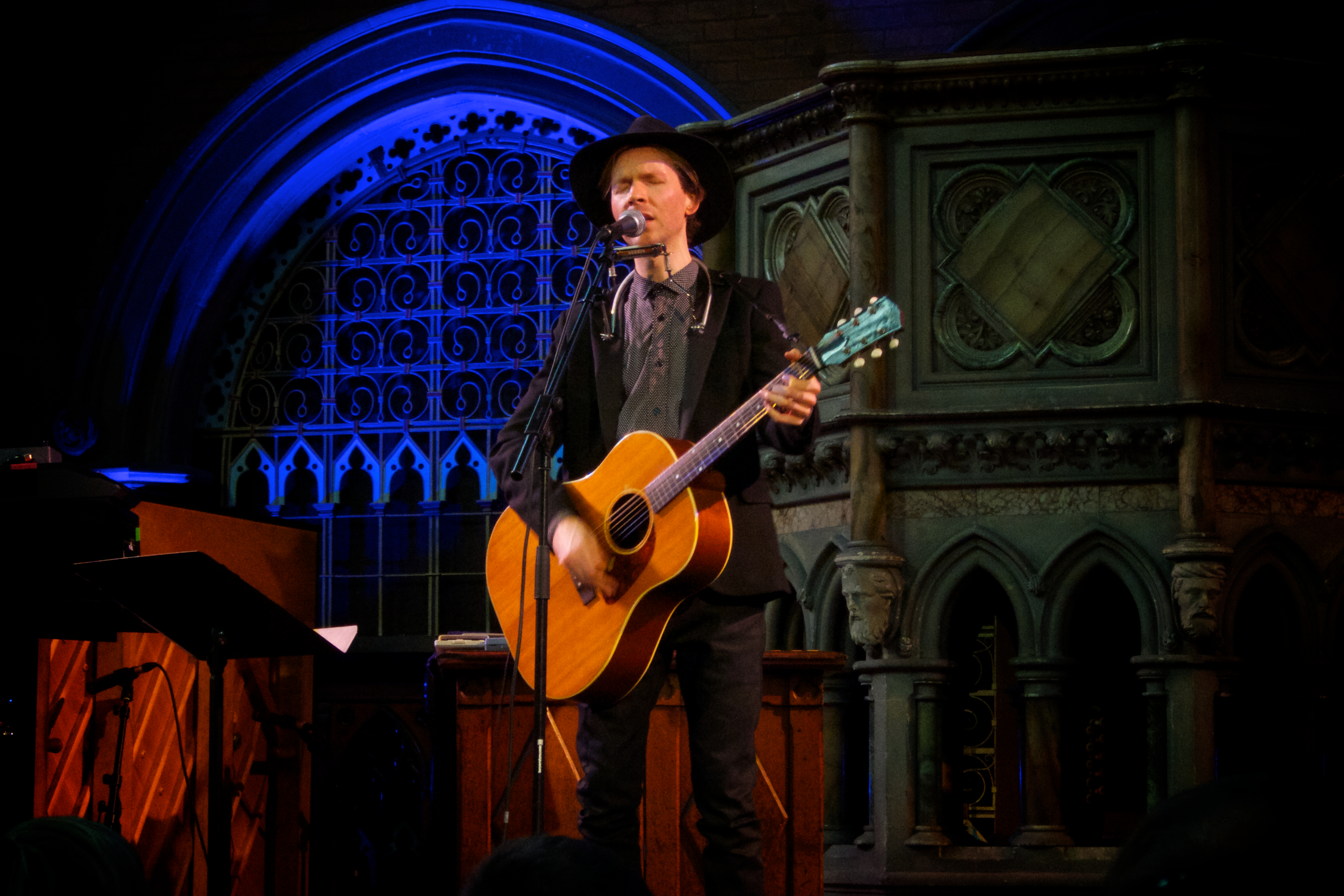
Beck performing in 2013

Song Reader, a project Beck released in December 2012, is 20 songs presented only as sheet music, in the hopes that enterprising musicians will record their own versions. The idea of Song Reader came about nearly fifteen years prior, shortly after the release of Odelay. When sent a book of transcribed sheet music for that album, Beck decided to play through it and grew interested in the world before recorded sound. He aimed to keep the arrangements as open as possible, to re-create the simplicity of the standards, and became preoccupied with creating only pieces that could fit within the Great American Songbook. In 2013 Beck began playing special Song Reader concerts with a variety of guests and announced he was working on a record of Song Reader material with other musicians as well as possibly a compilation of fan versions.

In the summer of 2013, Beck was reported to be working on two new studio albums: one a more self-contained acoustic disc in the vein of One Foot in the Grave and another described as a "proper follow-up" to Modern Guilt. Beck expected to release both albums independently, and released three standalone singles over the course of the year: the electro ballad "Defriended", the chorus-heavy "I Won't Be Long", and finally "Gimme". In October 2013, Beck signed to Capitol Records.

=== Morning Phase, Colors, Hyperspace (2014–2022) ===
In January, Beck released the lead single "Blue Moon" from his twelfth studio album, Morning Phase. A second single "Waking Light" was also released a week prior to the official release of Morning Phase on February 21, 2014. For the recording of the album, Beck reunited with many of the same musicians with whom he had worked on the critically acclaimed 2002 album Sea Change, and likely because of this, it has been noted that the two albums share a similar mood and genre.

On February 8, 2015, at the 57th Annual Grammy Awards, Morning Phase won three Grammys: Best Engineered Album, Non-Classical; Best Rock Album; and Album of the Year. Upon receiving the Album of the Year award, the album beat out Pharrell Williams's G I R L, Beyoncé's self-titled album, Sam Smith's In the Lonely Hour, and Ed Sheeran's x.

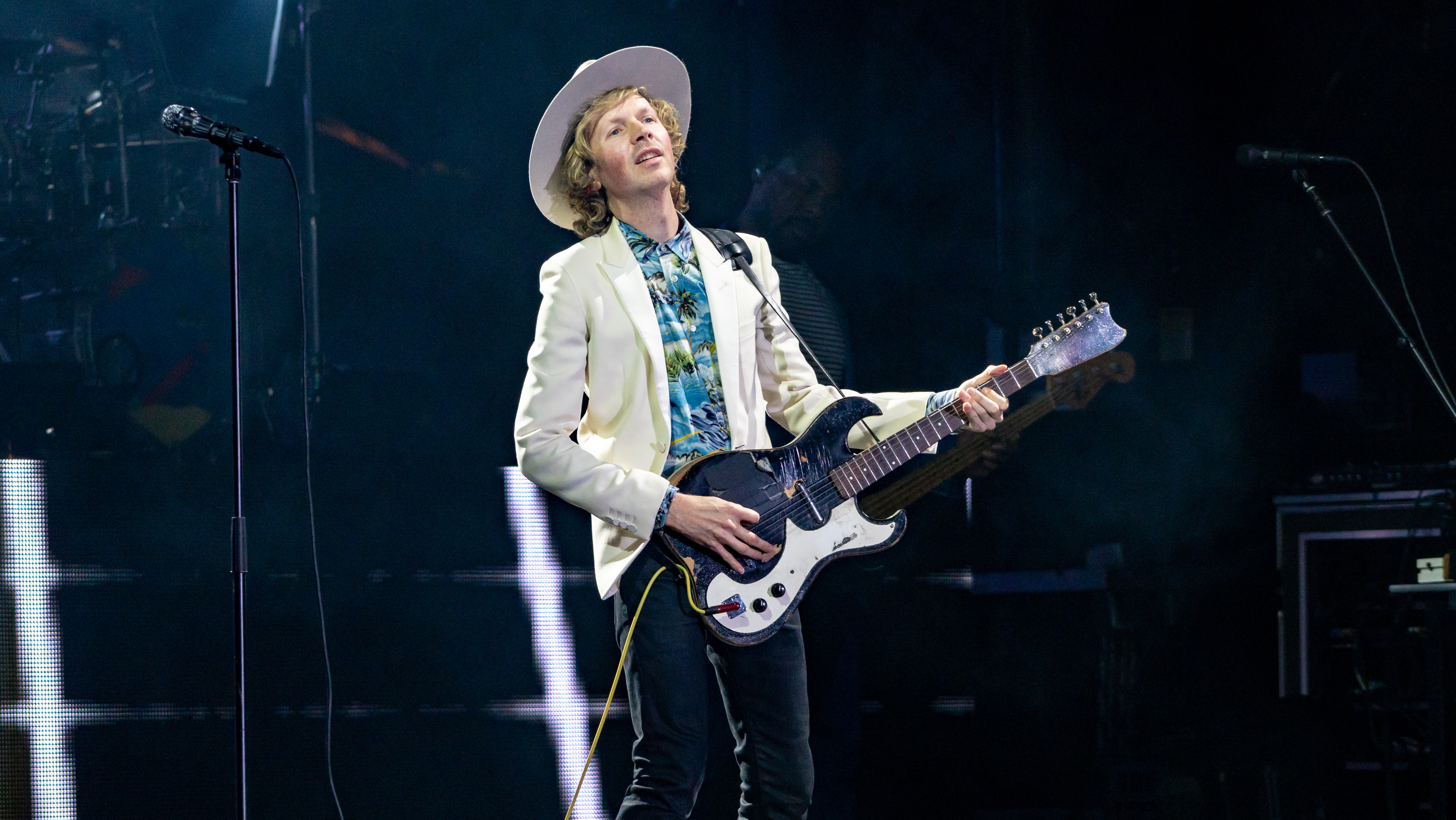
Beck in October 2018

In June 2015, Beck released "Dreams", the first single for his next album. The next June, he released the next single, "Wow". On September 8, 2017, Beck released the single "Dear Life", which was followed up with the official release of "Up All Night" on September 18. The album, Colors, was released on October 13, 2017. It was recorded at co-executive producer Greg Kurstin's Los Angeles studio, with Beck and Kurstin playing nearly every instrument themselves. The experimental pop-fused record received generally positive reviews from critics. On July 18, 2018, Beck performed the title track Colors, and the first single "Wow" on The Late Show with Stephen Colbert.

On April 15, 2019, Beck released a single co-produced with Pharrell Williams titled "Saw Lightning" from his fourteenth studio album, titled Hyperspace. The song "Dark Places" was released on November 6, with the album being released on November 22.

=== Ride Lonesome (2022–present) ===
On September 25, 2022, Beck released a cover of Neil Young's track "Old Man" to promote a Sunday Night Football game. The track was nominated for the Grammy Award for Best Rock Performance for the 65th Grammy Awards later in 2022. A music video for the track would be released on December 8, 2022. Following the commercial featuring the cover, Neil Young posted a still image from his 1988 music video for "This Note's For You", an anti-commercialization song in protest of the cover and commercial.

On February 10, 2023, he released the song "Thinking About You", his first original solo-track since Hyperspace in 2019. A music video for the track was released on February 20, 2023. Many music critics have noted that it sounds like a return to the folk of Morning Phase and Sea Change.

On June 21, 2023, Beck released the track "Odyssey" with French pop-rock band Phoenix, who did a co-headlining summer tour with Beck, which started in August and ended in September. On January 29, 2026, Beck announced the compilation album Everybody's Gotta Learn Sometime, curating a collection of rarities, deep cuts and cover versions, including previously unreleased recordings of "Your Cheatin' Heart" and "True Love Will Find You in the End". Initially, the eight-track album released digitally with a physical release on red vinyl set for February 13, 2026.

On April 20, 2026, Beck released the single "Ride Lonesome" to mostly positive reviews. When asked if this meant an album would follow it, Beck confirmed he was writing more music. On July 15, Beck announced his fifteenth studio album Ride Lonesome, set to release on September 18, 2026. That October, it was announced that he was set to be the opening act for the Latin American concerts U2's the Greatest Show on Earth World Tour in 2027.

== Collaborations and contributions ==
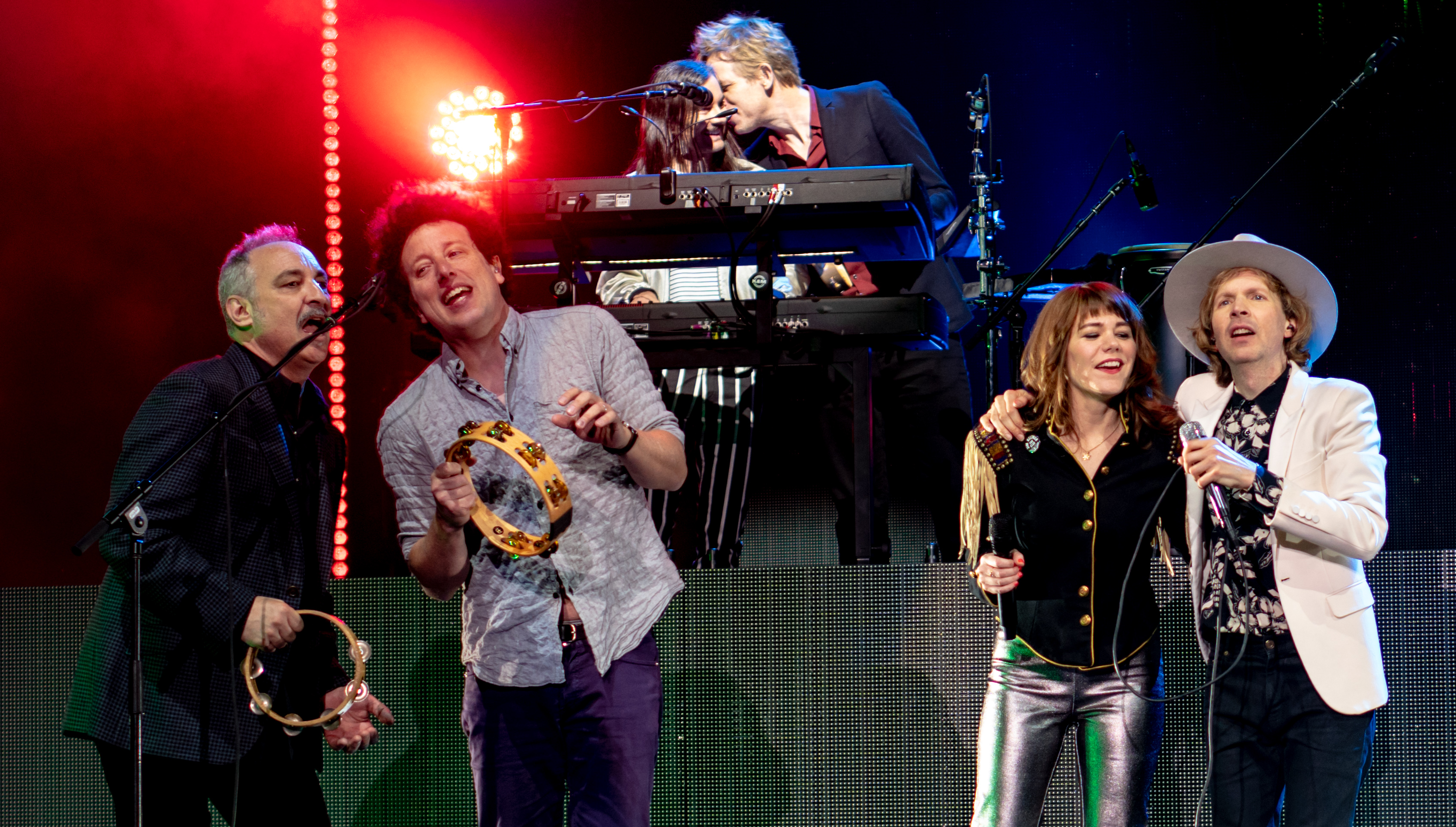
Beck performs at Madison Square Garden with Jenny Lewis in 2018

Beck co-wrote and performed on the song "Flavor", from the 1994 Jon Spencer Blues Explosion album Orange.

In 2019, Beck contributed to a tribute album for Bruce Haack and Esther Nelson and their label Dimension 5 Records. The album, Dimension Mix, released in 2005, was a benefit for Cure Autism Now that was produced by Ross Harris, an early collaborator who designed the artwork for Mellow Gold.

In 2004, Beck contributed a cover of the Korgi's 1980 New Wave song, "Everybody's Gotta Learn Sometime" to the soundtrack for Eternal Sunshine of the Spotless Mind.

On June 20, 2009, Beck announced that he was starting an experiment called Record Club, in which he and other musicians would record cover versions of entire albums in one day. The first album covered by Beck's Record Club was The Velvet Underground & Nico. Starting on June 18, the club began posting covers of songs from the album on Thursday evenings, each with its own video. On September 4, 2009, Beck announced the second Record Club album, Songs of Leonard Cohen. Contributors included MGMT, Devendra Banhart, Andrew Stockdale of Wolfmother and Binki Shapiro of Little Joy. In the third Record Club venture, Wilco, Feist, Jamie Lidell and James Gadson joined Beck to cover Skip Spence's Oar. The first song, "Little Hands", was posted on Beck's website on November 12, 2009. The Record Club has since covered albums by INXS and Yanni.

On June 19, 2009, Beck announced Planned Obsolescence, a weekly DJ set put together by Beck or guest DJs. Soon after, on July 7, Beck announced that his website would be featuring "extended informal conversations with musicians, artists, filmmakers, and other various persons" in a section called Irrelevant Topics. Then, on July 12, he added a section called Videotheque, which he said would contain "promotional videos from each album, as well as live clips, TV show appearances and other rarities". Also in 2009, Beck collaborated with Charlotte Gainsbourg on her album IRM, which was released in January 2010. Beck wrote the music, co-wrote the lyrics, and produced and mixed the album. The lead single, "Heaven Can Wait", is a duet by Beck and Gainsbourg.

In late February 2010, it was announced that electronic artist Tobacco of Black Moth Super Rainbow had collaborated with Beck on two songs, "Fresh Hex" and "Grape Aerosmith", on his upcoming album Maniac Meat. Tobacco revealed that in making the album, Beck sent the vocal parts to him, and that they had never actually met. In March 2010, Beck revealed that he had produced songs for the new Jamie Lidell album, Compass. In the summer of 2010, Beck contributed songs to both The Twilight Saga: Eclipse soundtrack, with "Let's Get Lost" (a duet with Bat for Lashes), and True Blood (HBO Original Series Soundtrack, Vol. 2), with "Bad Blood". He also contributed songs to the soundtrack of Edgar Wright's film Scott Pilgrim vs. the World, which was released in August 2010.

In 2011, he collaborated with Seu Jorge on a track titled "Tropicália (Mario C. 2011 Remix)" for the Red Hot Organization's charitable album Red Hot+Rio 2, a follow-up to the 1996 album Red Hot + Rio. Proceeds from the sales will be donated to raise awareness and money to fight AIDS/HIV and related health and social issues.

In October 2011, it was widely reported that Beck and producer Hector Castillo were collaborating with American composer Philip Glass to produce a remix album of the composer's works in honor of his 75th birthday. The album, Rework Philip Glass Remixed, was released on October 23, 2012, to critical acclaim, and featured Beck as both a curator and a performer. In particular, Pitchfork described Beck's 22-minute contribution to the album, "NYC: 73–78", as "a fantasia ... the most startling and original piece of music with Beck's name on it in a while, and the first new work to bear his own spirit in even longer." Reflecting on Beck's contribution to the album, Glass remarked that he was "impressed by the novelty and freshness of a lot of the ideas". Beyond his work as a performer, Beck acted as the album's curator, bringing together a diverse collection of artists—including Amon Tobin, Tyondai Braxton, Nosaj Thing, and Memory Tapes—whose work had also been influenced by Glass. In December 2012, an interactive iPhone app titled "Rework_" was released to complement the album.

Beck has contributed three new songs—"Cities", "Touch the People" and "Spiral Staircase"—to the video game Sound Shapes for PlayStation 3, PlayStation 4, and PlayStation Vita. Beck collaborated on two songs for Childish Gambino's "Royalty" mixtape in 2012. In 2014, Beck collaborated with Sia for the song "Moonquake Lake", which is featured in the soundtrack for the 2014 Annie film.

In 2015, Beck collaborated with former Fun. frontman Nate Ruess on the single "What This World Is Coming To", which was one of the Grammy-winning artist's many works featured on his debut solo album Grand Romantic released in June 2015. He also collaborated with electronic dance music duo The Chemical Brothers on their album Born in the Echoes, providing lead vocals and also credited in writing for the track "Wide Open", released in July. In 2016, Beck collaborated with French electronic music band M83, providing vocals for the song "Time Wind" from their album Junk. He was also featured on "Tiny Cities" by Flume. He also collaborated with Lady Gaga on the song "Dancin' in Circles", from her 2016 album Joanne.

Also in 2016, during a pre-show for the Grammy Awards, Beck collaborated with the surviving members of the band Nirvana to play Nirvana's rendition of "The Man Who Sold the World" as a tribute to both David Bowie, who had died just 1 month earlier, and Kurt Cobain, the former lead singer of Nirvana. Beck and Nirvana teamed up once again in 2020 for a fundraiser event, alongside St. Vincent and Dave Grohl's Daughter Violet Grohl.

In 2017, Beck appeared in the multiple award-winning film The American Epic Sessions, directed by Bernard MacMahon. He recorded "14 Rivers, 14 Floods" backed by a full gospel choir, live onto the first electrical sound recording system from the 1920s.

In 2019, Beck contributed to Cage The Elephant's song "Night Running" on their album Social Cues. He delivered vocals along with Matt Shultz and helped the band to finalise the song.

In 2021, Beck collaborated with Paul McCartney to make his hit single "Find My Way" on the album McCartney III Imagined.

In 2023, Beck collaborated with The Chemical Brothers for the second time on the song "Skipping like a Stone". This was the fourth single to be released from their album For That Beautiful Feeling.

In 2024, Beck appeared on the song, "Boom Boom Back" by the band, Hinds. The song is from the band's 2024 album, Viva Hinds. Later in July that year Beck also featured on the Orville Peck song "Death Valley High" off the latter's album Stampede. A music video for the song was also filmed and feature appearances from the two musicians as well as drag queen Gigi Goode and actress Sharon Stone.

== Musical style ==
Beck's musical style has been considered alternative and indie. He has played many of the instruments in his music himself. Beck has also done some remixes for fellow artists, notably David Bowie and Björk. He has been known to synthesize several musical elements together in his music, including folk, psychedelia, electronic, country, Latin music, hip-hop, funk, soul, blues, noise music, jazz, art pop and many types of rock. Because of this unconventional approach, Beck has been described as a postmodern musician. He has also taken music from Los Angeles as a reference point in his songs.

Pitchfork Media applauded Midnite Vultures, saying, "Beck wonderfully blends Prince, Talking Heads, Paul's Boutique, 'Shake Your Bon-Bon', and Mathlete on Midnite Vultures, his most consistent and playful album yet." The review commented that his mix of "goofy piety and ambiguous intent" helped the album. A Beck song called "Harry Partch", a tribute to the composer of the same name and his "corporeal" music, employs Partch's 43-tone scale.

== Art career ==
During 1998, Beck's art collaborations with his grandfather Al Hansen were featured in an exhibition titled "Beck & Al Hansen: Playing With Matches", which showcased solo and collaborative collage, assemblage, drawing and poetry works. The show toured from the Santa Monica Museum of Art to galleries in New York City and Winnipeg, Manitoba. Beck chose Winnipeg due to a family connection, as his grandfather gave their family stability through his work as a street car conductor in Winnipeg. A catalog of the show was published by Plug in Editions/Smart Art Press.

== Personal life ==
Beck's nine-year relationship with designer Leigh Limon and their breakup is said to have inspired his 2002 album Sea Change. He wrote most of the songs for the album one week after the breakup.

In April 2004, Beck married actress Marissa Ribisi, the twin sister of actor Giovanni Ribisi, shortly before the birth of their son, Cosimo Henri. Their daughter, Tuesday, was born in 2007. Beck filed for divorce from Ribisi on February 15, 2019. Their divorce was finalized on September 3, 2021.

Beck has described himself as both Jewish and a Scientologist, but no longer identifies as the latter. Through his parents, he has been involved in Scientology for most of his life, and his ex-wife, Marissa, is also a second-generation Scientologist. He publicly acknowledged his affiliation for the first time in a New York Times Magazine interview on March 6, 2005. In a 2008 interview with Spin, when asked about press interest in his spiritual life, Beck responded, "I don't pay attention to any of it, really. I'm not that aware of what the perception is. My father was doing Scientology in the '60s, so it's something that has been around for most of my life," adding, "I was raised celebrating Jewish holidays, and I consider myself Jewish. But I've read books on Scientology and drawn insights from that." In a November 2019 interview with The Sydney Morning Herald, Beck disavowed previous reports of his being a Scientologist and clarified, "I think there's a misconception that I'm a Scientologist. I'm not a Scientologist. I don't have any connection or affiliation with it."

Beck's mother is artist/writer/performer Bibbe Hansen, a former Andy Warhol's Factory collaborator. Since the early 1980s, she has been married to Chicano artist and media maker Sean Carrillo, a member of the performance art group ASCO, who became Beck's stepfather at age 22 when the musician was twelve years old. Along with Hansen, Carrillo operated the Troy Cafe, an artist hub in Los Angeles.

Beck has one full sibling, fiber artist Channing Hansen, born in 1972 in Los Angeles. They have a half-sister by their father and his current wife, singer and composer Pauline Frechette (known by the stage name Raven Kane), born in Los Angeles in 1985 - musician, actress, and former competitive figure skater, Alyssa Suede Lake. Poet Rain Whittaker, a friend of Channing's, lived with Hansen and Carrillo from the ages of 13 through 18.

Beck sustained a spinal injury while filming the music video for 2005's "E-Pro". The incident was severe enough to curtail his touring schedule for a few years, but he has since recovered.

Beck primarily lived in Los Feliz, Los Angeles until 2022. He owns properties in California, Tennessee, and Arkansas.

== Appearances in media ==
The 1986 punk rock musical film Population: 1, starred Tomata du Plenty of The Screamers and featured a young Beck in a small non-speaking role. Beck also appears in Southlander (2001), an American independent film by Steve Hanft and Ross Harris.

Beck has performed on Saturday Night Live seven times. During his 2006 performance in the Hugh Laurie episode, Beck was accompanied by the puppets that had been used onstage during his world tour. He has made two cameo appearances as himself on Saturday Night Live: one in a sketch about medicinal marijuana, and one in a VH1 Behind the Music parody that featured "Fat Albert & the Junkyard Gang". Beck performed a guest voice as himself on Matt Groening's animated show Futurama, in the episode "Bendin' in the Wind". He performed in episode 10 of the fourth season of The Larry Sanders Show, in which the producer character Artie (Rip Torn) referred to him as a "hillbilly from outer space". He also made a very brief voice appearance in the 1998 cartoon feature film The Rugrats Movie, and guest-starred as himself in a 1997 episode of Space Ghost Coast to Coast titled "Edelweiss".

On January 22, 2010, Beck appeared on the last episode of The Tonight Show with Conan O'Brien as a backup guitarist for a Will Ferrell-led rendition of Lynyrd Skynyrd's "Free Bird" alongside ZZ Top guitarist Billy Gibbons, Ben Harper, and O'Brien himself on guitar. Beck also appeared as himself in the 2017 film The Circle, giving a musical performance of the song "Dreams". He also appeared as himself in the 2022 film The Bubble, performing a version of "Ladies' Night".

== Discography ==
=== Studio albums ===
- Golden Feelings (1993)
- Stereopathetic Soulmanure (1994)
- Mellow Gold (1994)
- One Foot in the Grave (1994)
- Odelay (1996)
- Mutations (1998)
- Midnite Vultures (1999)
- Sea Change (2002)
- Guero (2005)
- The Information (2006)
- Modern Guilt (2008)
- Morning Phase (2014)
- Colors (2017)
- Hyperspace (2019)
- Ride Lonesome (2026)

== See also ==
- List of people from Los Angeles
- List of singer-songwriters

Preceded by Whitney Houston	Saturday Night Live musical guest January 11, 1997	Succeeded by Snoop Doggy Dogg
Preceded by Luciano Pavarotti and Vanessa Williams	Saturday Night Live musical guest January 9, 1999	Succeeded by Everlast
Preceded by Sting	Saturday Night Live musical guest December 4, 1999	Succeeded by R.E.M.
Preceded by Dixie Chicks	Saturday Night Live musical guest February 15, 2003	Succeeded by Foo Fighters
Preceded by Green Day	Saturday Night Live musical guest April 16, 2005	Succeeded by System of a Down
Preceded by My Chemical Romance	Saturday Night Live musical guest October 28, 2006	Succeeded by Christina Aguilera
Preceded by Imagine Dragons	Saturday Night Live musical guest March 1, 2014	Succeeded by The National
