= Saturday Night Live season 28 =

Saturday Night Live
- Season 28
- No. of episodes: 20

Release
- Original network: NBC
- Original release: October 5, 2002 – May 17, 2003

Season chronology
- ← Previous season 27 Next → season 29

Season 28 cast. Back row from left to right: Richards, Edwards, Armisen, Kattan, Sanz, Fallon, Poehler, Forte and Dratch. Front row from left to right: Meyers, Morgan, Rudolph, Fey, Hammond and Parnell.

The twenty-eighth season of Saturday Night Live, an American sketch comedy series, originally aired in the United States on NBC between October 5, 2002 and May 17, 2003.

== Cast ==
Prior to the start of this season, longtime cast members Will Ferrell, who had been of the show for seven seasons since 1995, he left on his own terms and Ana Gasteyer, who was on for six seasons since 1996, both left the show. In Gasteyer's case, she was on maternity leave during the break and decided not to return. In the wake of their departures, two new featured players were added: comedian and musician Fred Armisen and Will Forte of The Groundlings.

This season would be the last for longtime cast members Chris Kattan and Tracy Morgan, who had been on the show for eight and seven seasons, respectively, since 1996. Featured player Dean Edwards, who was hired to the cast the previous season, was let go following the end of this season.

=== Cast roster ===
Repertory players

- Rachel Dratch
- **Jimmy Fallon**
- **Tina Fey**
- Darrell Hammond
- Chris Kattan
- Tracy Morgan
- Chris Parnell
- Amy Poehler
- Maya Rudolph
- Horatio Sanz

Featured players

- Fred Armisen
- Dean Edwards
- Will Forte
- Seth Meyers
- Jeff Richards

Bold denotes Weekend Update anchor

== Writers ==
With the John McCain-hosted episode, T. Sean Shannon (who had been a writer since 1998) is named as a co-writing supervisor, alongside Paula Pell and Harper Steele.

== Episodes ==
No. overall	No. in season	Host	Musical guest(s)	Original release date
526	1	Matt Damon	Bruce Springsteen & the E Street Band	October 5, 2002
Bruce Springsteen & the E Street Band perform "Lonesome Day" with Soozie Tyrell for the first musical segment; Springsteen performs "You're Missing" alone on a piano in the second musical segment.; Earlier in the day, Springsteen rehearsed but ultimately did not play "My Hometown" alone on a piano.; Jim Cummings performed voiceover work in the "Smurfette Show" TV Funhouse sketch.; Fred Armisen and Will Forte's first episode as cast members.
527	2	Sarah Michelle Gellar	Faith Hill	October 12, 2002
Faith Hill performs "Cry" and "Free" and appears during the "No Wrestling" sketch.
528	3	John McCain	The White Stripes	October 19, 2002
The White Stripes perform "Dead Leaves and the Dirty Ground" and "We're Going to Be Friends".; Re-aired in tribute to McCain on September 1, 2018, the Saturday following his death
529	4	Eric McCormack	Jay-Z	November 2, 2002
Jay-Z performs "Guns N' Roses" with Lenny Kravitz and "'03 Bonnie & Clyde" with Kravitz and Beyoncé.
530	5	Nia Vardalos	Eve	November 9, 2002
Eve performs "Gangsta Lovin'" and "Satisfaction", and appears during the "Dropping The L.B.'s With Missy E" sketch.; Tina Fey's mother Jean appears during the opening monologue.
531	6	Brittany Murphy	Nelly	November 16, 2002
Nelly performs "Dilemma" with Kelly Rowland and "Hot in Herre", and appears in the "Astronaut Jones" sketch.; Former cast members Adam Sandler and Rob Schneider appear during the cold open to perform "The Chanukah Song".; Garrett Morris appears during the "Astronaut Jones" sketch.
532	7	Robert De Niro	Norah Jones	December 7, 2002
Norah Jones performs "Don't Know Why" and "Come Away with Me".; Harvey Keitel appears during the "Very Versace Christmas" sketch.
533	8	Al Gore	Phish	December 14, 2002
Phish performs "46 Days" and "Chalk Dust Torture", and appear in the "Jarret's Room" sketch. Animated versions of the band members appear in the "Peanuts Christmas" cartoon, which is partly soundtracked by their song "You Enjoy Myself".; Phish's performance was their first in over two years, ending the hiatus period they had embarked on in October 2000, the longest break from performing they had taken up to that point.; Tipper Gore appears during the cold open and the Daily Affirmation With Stuart Smalley sketch.; The West Wing cast members Allison Janney, Bradley Whitford, John Spencer, Martin Sheen, and Richard Schiff appear during the pre-recorded "The West Wing Set" sketch.; Al Franken appears during Daily Affirmation With Stuart Smalley, reprising his role as Stuart Smalley.; Brad Pitt performs a voice role during the "Peanuts Christmas" cartoon.
534	9	Jeff Gordon	Avril Lavigne	January 11, 2003
Avril Lavigne performs "I'm with You" and "Complicated".
535	10	Ray Liotta	The Donnas	January 18, 2003
The Donnas perform "Take It Off" and "Who Invited You".
536	11	Matthew McConaughey	Dixie Chicks	February 8, 2003
Dixie Chicks perform "Travelin' Soldier" and "Sin Wagon", and appear during the "Jarret's Room" sketch.
537	12	Jennifer Garner	Beck	February 15, 2003
Beck performs "Lost Cause" and "Guess I'm Doing Fine".
538	13	Christopher Walken	Foo Fighters	February 22, 2003
Foo Fighters perform "All My Life" and "Times Like These", with Jim Carrey appearing during their second performance.; Steve Martin, Will Ferrell, and Britney Spears appear during Weekend Update. Additionally, Ferrell appears during the "Lovers" sketch.
539	14	Queen Latifah	Ms. Dynamite	March 8, 2003
Ms. Dynamite performs "Dy-Na-Mi-Tee".; Dan Aykroyd appears during the "60 Minutes" cold open, reprising his impression of Bob Dole.; Jeff Bergman and Tom Kenny provide the voices of Bugs Bunny and SpongeBob SquarePants respectively during the "X-Presidents" cartoon.; Horatio Sanz pays tribute to Fred Rogers who died of stomach cancer nine days earlier.
540	15	Salma Hayek	Christina Aguilera	March 15, 2003
Christina Aguilera performs "Beautiful" and "Fighter", and appears during the "Versace Oscar Fashion Preview" sketch.; Edward Norton appears during the opening monologue.; The first episode where both the host and musical guest were Latina.
541	16	Bernie Mac	Good Charlotte	April 5, 2003
Good Charlotte performs "The Anthem" and "Lifestyles of the Rich & Famous".
542	17	Ray Romano	Zwan	April 12, 2003
Zwan performs "Lyric" and "Settle Down".
543	18	Ashton Kutcher	50 Cent	May 3, 2003
50 Cent performs "In Da Club" with G-Unit and "21 Questions" with G-Unit and Nate Dogg.
544	19	Adrien Brody	Sean Paul; Wayne Wonder	May 10, 2003
Sean Paul performs "Get Busy". Brody introduces Sean Paul while wearing a dreadlocks wig and imitating a Jamaican accent.; Wayne Wonder performs "No Letting Go".; Brody's parents Sylvia Plachy and Elliot Brody appear during the opening monologue.
545	20	Dan Aykroyd	Beyoncé	May 17, 2003
Beyoncé performs "Crazy in Love" with Jay-Z and "Dangerously in Love".; Jim Belushi appears during the opening monologue.; Chris Kattan's father Kip King appears during the "Rialto Grande" sketch.; John Goodman appears during "The Falconer" sketch, the "Donatella Versace Backyard Barbeque" sketch, and the "La Cuisina Canina" sketch.; Aykroyd brought in Tom Davis, one of the show's original writers, to help write this episode.; Aykroyd becomes the first SNL cast member to have a long gap between leaving the show as a cast member and returning to host at nearly 24 years (and, as of 2019, is the third and most recent cast member from the show's "Not Ready for Primetime" era [1975-1980] to come back and host).; Dean Edwards, Kattan and Tracy Morgan's final episode as cast members.

== Specials ==
Title	Original release date
"The Best of Will Ferrell"	September 28, 2002
Sketches include: "Alta Dena Mandatory Drug Assembly", "Cow Bell", "Dissin' Your Dog", "Spartan Cheerleaders", "The Coconuts Bangers Ball: It's A Rap!", "Celebrity Jeopardy", "Inside The Actors Studio", "Space, The Infinite Frontier with Harry Caray", "Luvahs at the Welshly Arm Motel", "Roxbury Guys", "The Replacement Nude Model", "Tension Dinner" and "Jacob Silj".
"SNL Christmas 2002"	December 17, 2002
Holiday-themed sketches from past episodes are aired. Jimmy Fallon and Tina Fey host.
Weekend Update Halftime Special	January 26, 2003
Weekend Update Halftime Special, timed to compete with the Super Bowl XXXVII halftime show.
