= Heavy Deavy Skull Lover =

Studio album by the Warlocks
- Released: October 7, 2007
- Genres: Psychedelic rock; neo-psychedelia; shoegaze
- Label: Tee Pee
- Producer: Rod Cervera

The Warlocks chronology
Surgery (2005)	Heavy Deavy Skull Lover (2007)	The Mirror Explodes (2009)

Heavy Deavy Skull Lover is the fourth album by American psychedelic rock band the Warlocks. It was released on October 7, 2007 by record label Tee Pee.

== Background ==
With this album, the Warlocks signed to Tee Pee Records, a small psychedelia-themed record label also home to band cohorts, the Brian Jonestown Massacre, who reportedly requested that the Warlocks be signed.

== Recording ==
The album was recorded as a stripped down four-piece, in departure from the octet, dual drummer formation of previous releases. The album is produced by Rod Cervera, who had previously worked on the Warlocks' debut album, Rise and Fall.

== Musical style ==
In contrast to the more refined sounding and major label released Surgery, the album features a rougher and less melodic sound, described by Drowned in Sound as akin to an "elongated jamming session".

Critics noted the album's darker sound than previous Warlocks albums. Describing the album's sound and mood, Pitchfork wrote: "The end goal here is the Cure: Live at Pompeii – lo-fi dirges heavy on slow-motion distortion, but with Hecksher's usual stoned-out sighs replaced by more pronounced, mopey affectations. That the bookend tracks both feature the word 'death' in the title offers some indication of the kind of mood he's in, and the pervasively dreary mood makes it hard to tell where the pained opener 'The Valley of Death' ends and the quicksand-slow descent of 'Moving Mountains' begins." Spin described the album as the Warlocks being "more funereal than ever". PopMatters countered, writing "Though 'The Valley of Death' starts the record off with a dreary note, the record itself is altogether quite glorious, buzzing and sticky with muck that's convincingly part saccharine."

== Release ==
Heavy Deavy Skull Lover was released on October 7, 2007 by Tee Pee.

== Reception ==
Professional ratings
Review scores
Source	Rating
AllMusic	4/5 stars
Drowned in Sound	8/10
The Guardian	3/5 stars
Pitchfork	5.0/10
PopMatters	8/10
Spin	4/10

Heavy Deavy Skull Lover received a mixed-to-positive critical reception.

Drowned in Sound wrote "The Warlocks may just have released their best album to date. While not containing the obvious singles of Phoenix, the album that ultimately lifted them into the spotlight of their own accord rather than via associations with co-conspirators, Heavy Deavy Skull Lover is by far their most ambitious, sprawling and intensely defiant collection of sounds [...] this is the 21st Century psychedelic sound of the West Coast in all its glory. Simply immense." The Guardian described the album as "potent stuff, but not something you'd want to listen to every day".

Spin, on the other hand, described it as "a middling version of shoegaze for people who stare at their hands."

== Track listing ==
1. "The Valley of Death" – 5:03
2. "Moving Mountains" – 10:59
3. "So Paranoid" – 6:27
4. "Slip Beneath" – 8:07
5. "Zombie Like Lovers" – 4:50
6. "Dreamless Days" – 5:31
7. "Interlude in Reverse" – 3:11
8. "Death, I Hear You Walking" – 6:24

Note that on the physical edition there are two hidden tracks.
