= Golden Feelings =

Studio album by Beck
- Released: 1993
- Recorded: 1992
- Genre: Anti-folk; lo-fi; country; blues
- Length: 42:35
- Label: Sonic Enemy
- Producer: Beck Hansen

Beck chronology
Fresh Meat + Old Slabs (1993)	Golden Feelings (1993)	A Western Harvest Field by Moonlight (1994)

Golden Feelings is the debut studio album by American musician Beck, released in 1993 by Sonic Enemy. The album showcases his roots in the anti-folk scene.

== Release ==
The album was initially available only in limited quantities on cassette, Sonic Enemy remastered the album and re-released it on CD in 1999. Beck was upset that they did so without his permission, and after he made his displeasure known, Sonic Enemy ceased to press any more copies. Only 2,000 were made, causing the CD to become quite valuable.

A few of the tracks on this album would appear on later releases, specifically "No Money No Honey" on his second studio album Stereopathetic Soulmanure, "Mutherfukka" on his third studio album Mellow Gold (renamed to "Mutherfucker"), "Super Golden Black Sunchild" and "Special People" as a B-side to the 1994 single "Pay No Mind (Snoozer)", and "Trouble All My Days" also as a B-side to "Pay No Mind (Snoozer)", 1996 single "Devils Haircut" and later on the deluxe edition of that singles album, Odelay.

The album was reissued in August 2025 on vinyl by Brazilian label Arquivo Perdido.

== Reception ==
Professional ratings
Review scores
Source	Rating
AllMusic	3/5 stars
The Encyclopedia of Popular Music	2/5 stars

AllMusic described the album as "an extremely interesting, entertaining, and humorous document that proves that from the start Beck had his heart set on making experimentation his only gimmick." UDiscoverMusic wrote that the album had varisped vocals and backward tapes, that "battle with cut-and-pasted audio scraps, weird, dissonant effects and deranged screams, in an oddly involving and darkly humorous excursion to Dystopia". They also wrote that Golden Feelings was anarchic and "sometimes not entirely listenable", but that "the contents of that lowest of lo-fi cassettes were nonetheless compelling".

Aaron Paskin of Spectrum Culture described the album as a "filthy, largely abrasive but fascinating document of the anti-folk movement and the beginnings of one of the most illustrious careers in music history", planting the seeds of what would eventually become lyrics on his third studio album Mellow Gold. Paskin also stated that frequently, the "music here is unhinged and abstract", highlighting this fact with specific tracks "No Money No Honey", "Mutherfukka", and "Schmoozer". Overall, they state that the album is an intriguing listen despite being unpleasant, being an "essential document for both anti-folk history and the roots of one of the most stylistically versatile and prolific artists ever."

In a ranking of every Beck album, Maura Johnston of Vulture placed the album in last, stating that while the occasional "grappling-hook-strong riff bubbles up", there's so much else going on that finding these isn't "all that appealing a prospect." The eighth track, "Heartland Feeling", which remains Beck's third longest song behind "Bonus Noise" and "The Horrible Fanfare/Landslide/Exoskeleton", was ranked as the 28th best Beck song by The Guardian.

Another ranking of Beck's records by Diffuser stated that while a time capsule to his early, more experimental work, is also "borderline unlistenable". Specific examples included Beck's distorted vocals and the layers of "intentionally obnoxious noise", even with that, they still note that some of the lyrics on this hint at "what's to come".

== Track listing ==
All tracks are written by Beck.

No.	Title	Length
1.	"The Fucked Up Blues"	2:11
2.	"Special People"	1:42
3.	"Magic Stationwagon"	1:36
4.	"No Money No Honey"	2:35
5.	"Trouble All My Days"	2:07
6.	"Bad Energy"	1:39
7.	"Schmoozer"	2:38
8.	"Heartland Feeling"	7:11
9.	"Super Golden Black Sunchild"	2:11
10.	"Soul Sucked Dry"	1:49
11.	"Feelings"	1:35
12.	"Gettin' Home"	4:14
13.	"Will I Be Ignored by the Lord"	1:59
14.	"Bogus Soul"	1:15
15.	"Totally Confused"	2:00
16.	"Mutherfukka"	2:44
17.	"People Gettin Busy"	3:09
Total length:		42:35
