= Fuckin with My Head (Mountain Dew Rock) =

1994 song by Beck

Song by Beck

from the album Mellow Gold
- Released: March 1, 1994
- Genre: Alternative rock; psychedelic rock; garage rock
- Length: 3:41
- Label: DGC
- Songwriter(s): Beck Hansen
- Producer(s): Beck Hansen; Tom Rothrock; Rob Schnapf; Carl Stephenson

Music video
- "Mountain Dew Rock" on YouTube

"Fuckin with My Head (Mountain Dew Rock)" is a song by the alternative rock musician Beck. It is the third song on his 1994 first album, Mellow Gold.

== Background ==
The song has many guitars and sounds that are layered together. Due to this, several sounds and influences are evident, including heavy metal, acoustic, psychedelic, funk, folk, boogie and rock.

== Live performances ==
The song has been performed live 60 times by Beck and was regularly played by him in 1994 but has not been performed live since December 2, 2007, when Beck was the opener for The Police.

== Critical reception ==
Stephen Thomas Erlewine of AllMusic wrote in a review for the album that the song was "garagey". The website udiscovermusic called the song one of the album's highlights. Stereogum wrote that the song had a lot of "forward momentum".
