= Forest for the Trees =

Forest for the Trees may refer to:

== Music ==
- Forest for the Trees (band), an American band
  - Forest for the Trees (album), a 1997 studio album by Forest for the Trees

=== Songs ===
- "Forest for the Trees", a song by Huey Lewis and the News from Fore! (1986)
- "Forest for the Trees", a song by The Dream Syndicate from Out of the Grey (1986)
- "Forest for the Trees", a song by The Original Sins from Move (1992)
- "Forest for the Trees", a song by Taxiride from Garage Mahal (2002)
- "Forest for the Trees", a song by Mickey Thomas from Over the Edge (2004)
- "Forest for the Trees", a song by Danko Jones from Never Too Loud (2008)

== Other ==
- Forest for the Trees (organization), an American nonprofit organization based in Portland, Oregon
- The Forest for the Trees, a 2003 German film directed by Maren Ade
- Forest for the Trees (film), a 2021 Canadian documentary film
- See the forest for the trees, an expression contrasting perception of an overall pattern from a mass of detail
- Simultanagnosia, a condition where the affected individual could see individual details of a complex scene but failed to grasp the overall meaning of the image
