= Truckdrivin Neighbors Downstairs (Yellow Sweat) =

1994 song by Beck

Song by Beck

from the album Mellow Gold
- Released: March 1, 1994
- Recorded: 1993
- Genre: Anti-folk; lo-fi; psychedelic folk
- Length: 2:55
- Label: DGC
- Songwriter(s): Beck Hansen
- Producer(s): Beck Hansen; Tom Rothrock; Rob Schnapf; Carl Stephenson

"Truckdrivin Neighbors Downstairs (Yellow Sweat)" is a song by the American musician Beck. It was released on his 1994 album Mellow Gold. The song was composed in the key of A-flat major.

== Background ==
The song begins with a sample of a fight that Beck recorded of his two abusive neighbors. Beck recalls,

When I was recording the song in my living room and they were out front screaming at each other and I couldn't...I had to stop recording my song. And it was strange because I was recording the music for the song; I hadn't written words yet. And I couldn't record anymore because they were too loud and I just left. I had to leave 'cause it was too hectic. When I came back I had all this...I had the song and then after they had this argument...it's too bad I lost the tape that has the original argument 'cause the argument went on for 40 minutes. It was unbelievable. I put 2 seconds of it on there. Pretty classic. But somebody out there has it.

Beck also called it "a special tape, filled with horrible things that will destroy your destiny if you know what it is."

He also said: "I was so shook up by the thing that I pulled over on the freeway and I just wrote the lyrics out and then the next day came back and sang the lyrics over the song. It was one of those experiences where life writes the songs. Which is good."

== Live performances ==
The earliest known performance of the song took place on March 30, 1994, when it was the last song in Beck's setlist.

Beck performed the song fairly regularly from 1994 up to 1997, since then, he only performs it occasionally. "Truckdrivin Neighbors Downstairs (Yellow Sweat)" was performed three times during 2018, after not having been performed since 2006.

Beck introduced the song during a performance on March 25, 1997, as a "true-life song." He further said: "This is urban tragedy. This is a 1990s gothic tale of a duo, of tragedy and self-abuse. Not to be exploited. Not to be frowned down on. Just to be heard."

== Reception ==
American critic Robert Christgau called the song's hook "Vietnam vet playin' air guitar" "illicitly taped tirade".

Rolling Stone writer Michael Azerrad called the song a "bilious burst".
