= Steal My Body Home =

Song by Beck

from the album Mellow Gold
- Released: March 1, 1994
- Recorded: 1992
- Genre: Alternative rock
- Length: 5:34
- Label: DGC
- Songwriter(s): Beck Hansen
- Producer(s): Beck Hansen; Tom Rothrock; Rob Schnapf; Carl Stephenson

"Steal My Body Home" is a song by the American musician Beck. It was released in 1994 on the album Mellow Gold. The song was recorded in 1992 along with Carl Stephenson, around the same time they had been working on Beck's biggest hit, "Loser". Stephenson added rattling percussion and a kazoo solo to the song.

== Background ==
Although the majority of the song is slow and sinister sounding, it becomes more upbeat during the last one and a half minutes, with the use of a kazoo and a sitar, contrasting with the first part of the song which mainly uses a violin. The lyrics features blues imagery, with lines such as "sleeping on a hollow log" and "you know you cannot hide when the devil's your only friend".

Stereogum writer Tom Breihan described Beck's vocals in the song as being "near-atonal".

== Live performances ==
"Steal My Body Home" is only known to have been played live once, during a concert on the Mellow Gold tour in Japan on September 1, 1994. A bootleg recording of the show was discovered many years after the concert had taken place.

== Reception ==
Ernest May of Consequence of Sound thought that "Steal My Body Home" was among Beck's best songs, and described it as a poetic song that "gets existential with a circulating sitar creating a very ethereal atmosphere."

Rolling Stone magazine wrote that the song sounded like a "resigned dreamscape".

The website Across the Margin thought that "Steal My Body Home" was the album's most complete sounding song, and wrote that it is "a wildly successful attempt to slow things down, to let the listener expand into the album's headspace and take a bizarre look around. To catch a momentary musical breath, before the song's vibrant, kazoo-flecked ending overwhelms whatever sanctity the song had steadily built for itself and brings it all loudly crashing down."

IGN described the song as "a downer number that is best experienced whilst wearing headphones and in a mental haze".
