= The Mirror Explodes =

Studio album by the Warlocks
- Released: 19 May 2009
- Genres: Psychedelic rock; shoegaze
- Length: 43:12
- Label: Tee Pee
- Producer: Rod Cervera

The Warlocks chronology
Heavy Deavy Skull Lover (2007)	The Mirror Explodes (2009)	Skull Worship (2013)

Professional ratings
Aggregate scores
Source	Rating
Metacritic	59/100
Review scores
Source	Rating
Planet Sound	6/10 stars
Rock Sound	5/10 stars
The Skinny	4/5 stars

The Mirror Explodes is the fifth full-length album by American psychedelic rock band the Warlocks. It was released on May 19, 2009 by record label Tee Pee. The album is produced by Rod Cervera, who had previously worked on the band's albums Rise and Fall and Heavy Deavy Skull Lover.

== Track listing ==
1. "Red Camera" - 5:30
2. "The Midnight Sun" - 4:27
3. "Slowly Disappearing" - 4:52
4. "There Is a Formula to Your Despair" - 4:43
5. "Standing Between the Lovers of Hell" - 5:48
6. "You Make Me Wait" - 5:54
7. "Frequency Meltdown" - 6:10
8. "Static Eyes" - 5:43
