= Stereopathetic Soulmanure =

Studio album by Beck
- Released: February 22, 1994
- Recorded: 1988–1993
- Genres: Anti-folk; lo-fi; country; noise
- Length: 64:35
- Label: Flipside
- Producers: Tom Grimley; Beck Hansen; Gus Hudson

Beck chronology
A Western Harvest Field by Moonlight (1994)	Stereopathetic Soulmanure (1994)	Mellow Gold (1994)

Professional ratings
Review scores
Source	Rating
AllMusic	3/5 stars
Robert Christgau	B+
Encyclopedia of Popular Music	2/5 stars
IGN	6.9/10
The Rolling Stone Album Guide	3.5/5 stars

Stereopathetic Soulmanure is the second studio album by American musician Beck. It was released on February 22, 1994, by Flipside. The album shows a strong folk influence, consisting of home recordings, studio recordings, live performances, field recordings, sound collages, and abstract noise experiments.

A lo-fi recording of largely anti-commercial nature, Stereopathetic Soulmanure is Beck's third official recording, the first two being Golden Feelings and A Western Harvest Field by Moonlight. Beck would soon return with the mostly acoustic One Foot in the Grave and Mellow Gold before recording his major label follow-up Odelay (1996).

== Background and release ==
Following the release of his first two recordings, Golden Feelings and A Western Harvest Field by Moonlight, Beck would sign to major label DGC following the success of the 1993 single "Loser". He managed to get a deal to release independent music on the side, compiling recordings from between 1988 and 1993 onto Stereopathetic Soulmanure. His major label debut, Mellow Gold, was released weeks later.

As of July 2008, Stereopathetic Soulmanure has sold over 146,000 copies in the United States.

On January 30, 2023, nearly 29 years after the album's release, Stereopathetic Soulmanure was officially released on digital storefronts and streaming services. This digital version uses the 2000 re-release track list, with the exception that the bonus noise is on its own track, as opposed to the same track as "Modesto." The bonus noise is titled "Salmonella Shizergeist (Utopia)" on digital platforms.

== Reception ==
AllMusic described the album as a "schizophrenic collection of lo-fi recordings" that didn't have much in common with his next record, Mellow Gold. The review noted influences from Sonic Youth and Pussy Galore. Overall, they believed the record was a "bid for indie credibility that may have scared away fans who discovered Beck through Mellow Gold, Stereopathetic is as uncompromising and as unlistenable as Sonic Youth or their many imitators at their most extreme."

Spence D. of IGN stated that the majority of this record sounded like "down-n-dirty, feedback heavy squonk", stating that to get the gist of "where Beck was at back in the day," you only needed to hear the first track "Pink Noise (Rock Me Amadeus)". Specific highlights they noted include "Rowboat", which they believed showcases Beck's devotion to more traditional country and folk music, "Thunderpeel", which was noted as "unraveling into a fuzz-drenched, falsetto treated skirl of gale force sludge". Overall, they state that the album, despite highlights, is a mixed bag that showcases Beck's "cavernous genius" but should be left to "Beck diehards" and "lo-fi curiosity seekers" only.

The Rolling Stone Album Guide was very positive towards the album, stating that Beck proved himself "the kind of folkie who can ride boxcars with Depression-era hoboes" in "Waitin' for a Train". Other highlights include the "cathartic punk" of "Tasergun" and "Pink Noise (Rock Me Amadeus)" to the "gorgeous Deadhead country" of "Modesto".

== Track listing ==
All songs were written by Beck, except "Waitin' for a Train", written by Jimmie Rodgers.

No.	Title	Length
1.	"Pink Noise (Rock Me Amadeus)"	2:57
2.	"Rowboat"	3:45
3.	"Thunder Peel"	1:48
4.	"Waitin' for a Train"	1:08
5.	"The Spirit Moves Me"	2:10
6.	"Crystal Clear (Beer)"	2:29
7.	"No Money No Honey"	2:13
8.	"8.6.82"	0:37
9.	"Total Soul Future (Eat It)"	1:48
10.	"One Foot in the Grave"	2:14
11.	"Aphid Manure Heist"	1:29
12.	"Today Has Been a Fucked Up Day"	2:34
13.	"Rollins Power Sauce"	1:54
14.	"Puttin It Down"	2:23
15.	"11.6.45"	0:30
16.	"Cut 1/2 Blues"	2:37
17.	"Jagermeister Pie"	1:07
18.	"Ozzy"	2:05
19.	"Dead Wild Cat"	0:25
20.	"Satan Gave Me a Taco"	3:46
21.	"8.4.82"	0:26
22.	"Tasergun"	3:51
23.	"Modesto"	3:27
24.	"Ken" (unlisted)	0:12
25.	"Bonus Noise" (unlisted)	16:36
Total length:		64:35

Notes

- "Bonus Noise" is included on most discs, but not all.

=== Re-release track listing ===
There was a re-release of the album by Revolver USA on September 25, 2000. This pressing separates "No Money No Honey" over tracks 7 and 8 and breaks parts of "One Foot in the Grave" and "Aphid Manure Heist" over tracks 12, 13 and 14. This caused all tracks after "Crystal Clear (Beer)" to be off from the track listing on the back cover. This pressing also omits the short snippet of dialog called "Ken," yet keeps "Bonus Noise" on the same track as "Modesto." This pressing causes some online track listings, such as the one at Allmusic, to be incorrect. The actual track listing of this pressing is as follows:

1. "Pink Noise (Rock Me Amadeus)" – 2:57
2. "Rowboat" – 3:45
3. "Thunder Peel" – 1:48
4. "Waitin' for a Train" – 1:08
5. "The Spirit Moves Me" – 2:10
6. "Crystal Clear (Beer)" – 2:29
7. "Noise 1" (start of "No Money No Honey") – 0:05
8. "No Money No Honey" – 2:07
9. "8.6.82" – 0:37
10. "Total Soul Future (Eat It)" – 1:48
11. "One Foot in the Grave" – 1:57
12. "Noise 2" (end of "One Foot in the Grave") – 0:17
13. "Noise 3" (start of "Aphid Manure Heist") – 0:31
14. "Aphid Manure Heist" – 0:57
15. "Today Has Been a Fucked Up Day" – 2:34
16. " "Rollins Power Sauce" " – 1:54
17. "Puttin' It Down" – 2:23
18. "11.6.45" – 0:30
19. "Cut 1/2 Blues" – 2:37
20. "Jagermeister Pie" – 1:07
21. "Ozzy" – 2:05
22. "Dead Wild Cat" – 0:25
23. "Satan Gave Me a Taco" – 3:46
24. "8.4.82" – 0:26
25. "Tasergun" – 3:51
26. "Modesto" (includes "Bonus Noise", but not "Ken") – 20:07

This release can be differentiated from the original 1994 Flipside release in two ways. The re-released CD has "FLIP660" printed on the CD, whereas the original has "FLIP60." The CD artwork, however, still retains the original catalog number on the spine. There is also a message above the barcode on the back cover that reads "Distributed by Revolver USA www.midheaven.com/fi/".

== Personnel ==
- Beck – vocals, guitars, bass, keyboard, banjo, composer, sound effects
- Rachel – drums
- Leo LeBlanc – pedal steel
- Bobby Hecksher – guitar
- Rusty Cusak – engineer
- Gibran Evans – design
- Tom Grimley – engineer

== Notes ==
- The track "Waitin' for a Train" is a cover of a Jimmie Rodgers song. It opens with a soundbite (spoken by Ross Harris) from Steve Hanft's film Normal. Hanft and Harris are both longtime friends and collaborators of Beck.
- The tracks "No Money No Honey" and "Today Has Been a Fucked Up Day" contain snippets of "Hall of Mirrors" by B12 and "Olivine" by Black Dog Productions, respectively.
