= Beercan (song) =

Single by Beck

from the album Mellow Gold
- Released: 1994
- Genre: Alternative rock; alternative hip hop; neo-psychedelia
- Length: 4:01
- Label: Bong Load; DGC
- Songwriter: Beck Hansen
- Producer: Carl Stephenson

Beck singles chronology
"Pay No Mind (Snoozer)" (1994)	"Beercan" (1994)	"Where It's At" (1996)

Music video
- "Beercan" on YouTube

"Beercan" is a single by Beck, taken from his first major record label release, Mellow Gold. It peaked at number 27 on the U.S. Modern Rock Tracks charts.

== Conception and recording ==
"Beercan" was produced by Carl Stephenson and featured his characteristic layers of sound and bizarre samples: this song in particular prominently features samples from a Care Bears album. The song also samples a small part of the Melvins song "Hog Leg".

As mentioned in the song, Beck once had a job blowing leaves. Beck once reminisced, "There's a leaf-blower contingent. There's no union that I know of so far, but there's certainly a spiritual brotherhood. They are the originators of noise music. It's like a cross between a Kramer guitar and a jet pack."

== Music video ==
Like Beck's earlier single "Loser", the experimental video for "Beercan" was directed by friend and director Steve Hanft. The video features a group of homeless people destroying a house. A recurring theme throughout the video is the presence of a rainbow, possibly a reference to the Care Bears album sampled in the song. Melvins frontman Buzz Osborne also makes an appearance.

== Track listing ==
1. "Beercan" - 4:01
2. "Got No Mind" - 4:22
3. "Asskiss Powergrudge (Payback! '94)" - 3:06
4. "Totally Confused" - 3:28
5. "Spanking Room" - 9:07
  - Contains "Loser" (Pseudo-Muzak Version) as a hidden track at 5:41.

== Charts ==
Chart (1994)	Peak position
Australia (ARIA)	98
U.S. Billboard Modern Rock Tracks	27
