= Chiara Angelicola =

American singer-songwriter and musician

Chiara Angelicola (born September 15, 1984) is an American singer-songwriter and musician, known for her work in the musical projects Motel Pools and Bird Call.

Angelicola has worked as an educator. She earned a BA in Child Development Psychology with Honors from the University of California-Santa Cruz in 2006. She is a member of the North American Reggio Emilia Alliance, the Innovative Teachers Project, and the National Association for the Education of Young Children.

== Musical career ==
Since 2009, Bird Call has gone on tours. After having written a collection of new songs in winter 2011, Angelicola approached composer and orchestrator Bryan Senti (Mark Ronson, Rufus Wainwright, Miike Snow) to produce Bird's first full-length record. In 2011, she won "Best Performer" at the International Songwriting Competition. Angelicola released two EPs under the moniker Bird Call. The Animals Know EP was written by Angelicola in Brooklyn, recorded at Studio G by producer Joel Hamilton, and released in October 2010 (FHC Records). Other Creatures EP (May 2011, FHC Records), also produced by Hamilton, is a collection of cover songs that features the song "Lost Cause" by Beck.

Will We Get To Mars digitally released worldwide on September 3, 2013, alongside a premiere with UK's The Guardian. Jessica Yatrofsky directed the music video for the self-titled track, which premiered with Nylon on October 4, 2013. It was produced by Bryan Senti.

Year of the Dogfish is a collection of songs written by Angelicola between 2016 and 2018, during which Chiara left the Bay Area and moved to Los Angeles. It is produced by Angelicola alongside her longtime friend, engineer, and mixer Gabriel Galvin of Four Foot Studios in Brooklyn, New York.

Bird Call's latest long-play, Year of the Dogfish, was released on November 8, 2019. Since then, Chiara additionally released two EPs with her second project, Motel Pools, Volume I (2015) and Volume II (2016), with the former produced by Kyp Malone of TV on the Radio.

== Motel Pools ==
Chiara Angelicola created a garage punk rock project, Motel Pools. Original demos for Motel Pools were tracked in Chiara's Williamsburg living room in 2011 until her relocation back to California. Upon her return to her hometown of San Francisco, Chiara reached out to friend Kyp Malone in Brooklyn to help produce the project's first EP. Honus Honus of Man Man makes a guest vocal appearance on the track "Lemme Walk Your Dog". Motel Pools covers Butthole Surfers's Human Cannonball. In 2016, Motel Pools released a full-length LP featuring Volume 1 and Volume 2 EPs. Angelicola wrote and produced Volume II, which was recorded at Black Lodge Recording in Bushwick, New York.
