= Surgery (album) =

Studio album by the Warlocks
- Released: August 23, 2005
- Genre: Psychedelic rock
- Length: 59:05
- Label: Mute
- Producer: Tom Rothrock

The Warlocks chronology
Phoenix (2002)	Surgery (2005)	Heavy Deavy Skull Lover (2007)

Surgery is the third full-length album by American psychedelic rock band the Warlocks. It was released by major label Mute on August 23, 2005, and was produced by Tom Rothrock.

The album also marks the first time the US and UK releases have featured identical track listings.

== Content ==
Surgery has been remarked on by critics for having a more refined sound to 2002's Phoenix, a sound described by band leader Bobby Hecksher as "space age doo-wop". The average track length is notably shorter to previous releases, and the album is lyrically darker to the drug-centric Phoenix and Rise and Fall.

According to the liner notes, the album is dedicated to the memory of fellow Los Angeles-based musician Elliott Smith and to Bomp! Records founder Greg Shaw.

== Reception ==
Professional ratings
Aggregate scores
Source	Rating
Metacritic	61/100
Review scores
Source	Rating
AllMusic	4/5 stars
Blender	3.5/5 stars
Drowned in Sound	8/10
Mojo	4/5 stars
NME	7/10
Pitchfork	1.7/10
PopMatters	6/10
Q	2/5 stars
Rolling Stone	3/5 stars
Tiny Mix Tapes	3/5 stars

Surgery has been generally well-received by critics. Drowned in Sound wrote: "'Surgery' isn't the unlistenable, depression-fest it's [sic] lyrical content threatens it to be. Instead, it's heartfelt message combined with the monstrous sound behind it make it one of the most curiously uplifting records of the year."

== Track listing ==
1. "Come Save Us" – 4:43
2. "It's Just Like Surgery" – 4:06
3. "Gypsy Nightmare" – 4:20
4. "Angels in Heaven, Angels in Hell" – 4:15
5. "We Need Starpower" – 4:26
6. "Thursday's Radiation" – 7:44
7. "Evil Eyes Again" – 3:32
8. "The Tangent" – 5:01
9. "Above Earth" – 4:20
10. "Bleed Without You Babe" – 4:24
11. "Suicide Note" – 12:12
