= Pay No Mind (Snoozer) =

Single by Beck

from the album Mellow Gold
- Released: April 1994
- Recorded: 1993
- Genre: Alternative rock; anti-folk
- Length: 3:14
- Label: Geffen
- Songwriter: Beck
- Producers: Rob Schnapf; Tom Rothrock

Beck singles chronology
"Loser" (1993)	"Pay No Mind (Snoozer)" (1994)	"Beercan" (1994)

Music video
- "Pay No Mind (Snoozer)" on YouTube

"Pay No Mind (Snoozer)" is a song by American musician Beck, taken from his first major label album, Mellow Gold (1994), and released in April 1994, by Geffen Records as its second single.

== Conception and recording ==
Said to be one of the oldest songs on Mellow Gold, Beck has claimed that he wrote it as a struggling musician, at the age of 18 or 19. Beck claimed that the song originally had ten verses, which were cut down for commercial release. On a limited number of Mellow Gold 12" vinyl albums, one can hear a version with an added stanza, which is inserted between the first and second verses of the standard Mellow Gold version. "Got No Mind", a re-recorded, electric full-band arrangement of "Pay No Mind", features three of the seven verses of "Pay No Mind" that were cut on Mellow Gold and is included on the single for "Beercan".

== Composition and lyrics ==
"Pay No Mind (Snoozer)" is a simple folk rock song with an understated harmonica solo. According to an interpretation by Whiskeyclone.net, the song's lyrical content explores Beck's attitudes towards the music industry. The first verse describes a city, which, despite being decrepit and dirty, is filled with shopping malls. In the second verse, Beck expresses resentment towards what he sees as the commercialism of major record labels focused on record sales and money, rather than artistic creativity. In the third verse, he concludes that, despite his negative stance, he is looking for a change, which getting signed would provide.

Also to be noted is that the songs "Special People", "Trouble All My Days", and "Super Golden Black Sunchild" are from Beck's 1993 "Golden Feelings". On the release, "Special People" is listed as track 2; "Trouble All My Days" is listed as track 5; and "Super Golden Black Sunchild" is listed as track 9.

== Reception ==
Larry Flick from Billboard magazine wrote, "Those anticipating 'Loser Pt. 2' are actually going to get it, but not in the skewed hip-hop form they expected—proving, perhaps, that Beck is no one-trick homie. Same out-there-looking-in point of view is backed here with slurred acoustic guitars and sleepy rhythm. Weird and worthwhile." Alan Jones from Music Week said, "The mumbling vocal, the acoustic guitar and the harmonica solo all point to Bob Dylan, though the inimitable Beck remains his own man. 'Pay No Mind' is one of the more dour performances to be found on the Mellow Gold album and is unlikely to match the success of 'Loser'."

First known to be played live in 1993, "Pay No Mind" is still a fan-favorite and a staple of Beck's live shows. Beck is known for radically re-working the lyrics of the song while on stage to include commentary on things as diverse as Tom Petty and 99 cent stores. A music video, directed by Beck's friend Steve Hanft, was released for the song which featured Beck playing the acoustic guitar while wearing a shirt with the words "Rock Me" written onto the fabric; interspersed throughout the video are people enjoying cocktails, professional skateboarder Mark Gonzales performing random tricks, lava eruptions, diamonds, and other random stuff. Footage of the lava erupting and the final scene of a policeman running into a police station comes from episodes of the TV series In Search of... with Leonard Nimoy.

The video later appeared on an episode of Beavis and Butt-Head.

== Track listing ==
1. "Pay No Mind (Snoozer)" [LP Version] - 3:17
2. "Special People" - 1:43
3. "Trouble All My Days" - 2:24
4. "Supergolden (Sunchild)" - 2:22

== Charts ==
Chart (1994)	Peak position
Australia (ARIA)	139

== Cover version ==
American alternative rock band Sonic Youth recorded the song for the Japanese and Brazilian versions of their 2009 album The Eternal.
