= One Foot in the Grave (Beck album) =

Studio album by Beck
- Released: June 27, 1994
- Recorded: October 1993 and January 1994
- Studio: Dub Narcotic, Olympia, Washington
- Genre: Anti-folk; indie rock; lo-fi; alternative country
- Length: 37:05; 72:57 (deluxe edition)
- Label: K, Iliad, Geffen
- Producer: Calvin Johnson

Beck chronology
Mellow Gold (1994)	One Foot in the Grave (1994)	Odelay (1996)

Professional ratings
Review scores
Source	Rating
AllMusic	4/5 stars
American Songwriter	5/5 stars
Entertainment Weekly	B+
Los Angeles Times	3/4 stars
NME	7/10
Pitchfork	7.8/10
Record Collector	4/5 stars
Rolling Stone	4/5 stars
The Rolling Stone Album Guide	2.5/5 stars
Uncut	4/5 stars

One Foot in the Grave is the fourth studio album by American alternative rock musician Beck, released in June 1994 on K Records, an independent label. The album cover features a photo of Beck on the right and bassist James Bertram on the left. It was recorded prior to the release of Mellow Gold, but was not released until after that album had met critical and commercial success. One Foot in the Grave shows a strong lo-fi and folk influence, and features several songs that are interpolations or covers of songs popularized by artists like Skip James and The Carter Family.

One Foot in the Grave features production, songwriting, and backing vocal assistance by Calvin Johnson, founder of K Records and Beat Happening. It also features performances by Built to Spill members James Bertram and Scott Plouf, Love as Laughter's Sam Jayne, as well as The Presidents of the United States of America frontman Chris Ballew. The album was recorded at Dub Narcotic Studio, which at the time was housed in Johnson's basement.

Like Stereopathetic Soulmanure, the album never charted; however, One Foot in the Grave strengthened Beck's critical reputation, arguably allowing him to break into the mainstream with Odelay in 1996. As of July 2008, One Foot in the Grave had sold 168,000 copies in the United States. On April 14, 2009, the album was reissued with 16 bonus tracks, including 12 unreleased tracks, by Beck's own Iliad label.

== Song information ==
"He's a Mighty Good Leader" is a re-write of Delta blues guitarist Skip James' "Jesus is a Mighty Good Leader", utilizing the chords, melody and most of the lyrics from the original.

"Fourteen Rivers Fourteen Floods" utilizes a similar melody, lyric and instrumentation to the African American spiritual "You Gotta Move", which was popularized by Fred McDowell and later recorded by The Rolling Stones on their Sticky Fingers album.

"Girl Dreams" is an interpolation of the Carter Family composition "Lover's Lane". According to Calvin Johnson, Beck seemed "embarrassed" by the song and had to be convinced to include it on One Foot in the Grave. Beck would record other Carter Family songs during this time period, including "The Storms Are On The Ocean" recorded as "The World May Lose Its Motion" and released on a 1994 Yoyo Recordings compilation.

== Track listing ==
All songs written by Beck, except where noted.

No.	Title	Writer(s)	Length
1.	"He's a Mighty Good Leader"	Skip James, credited to "Traditional"	2:41
2.	"Sleeping Bag"		2:15
3.	"I Get Lonesome"		2:50
4.	"Burnt Orange Peel"		1:39
5.	"Cyanide Breath Mint"		1:37
6.	"See Water"		2:22
7.	"Ziplock Bag"		1:44
8.	"Hollow Log"		1:53
9.	"Forcefield"	Beck, Sam Jayne	3:31
10.	"Fourteen Rivers Fourteen Floods"		2:54
11.	"Asshole"		2:32
12.	"I've Seen the Land Beyond"		1:40
13.	"Outcome"		2:10
14.	"Girl Dreams"	The Carter Family, Beck	2:02
15.	"Painted Eyelids"		3:06
16.	"Atmospheric Conditions"	Beck, Calvin Johnson	2:09
Total length:			37:05

=== Japanese bonus tracks ===
17. "It's All in Your Mind" – 2:56
18. "Feather in Your Cap" – 1:12
19. "Whiskey Can Can" – 2:15

These bonus tracks are out-takes from the One Foot in the Grave sessions and were issued on the "It's All In Your Mind" 7" single in 1995. Both "Feather in Your Cap" and "It's All in Your Mind" were later re-recorded as full studio productions with a full band. The former was recorded in 1994 and issued as a B-side of the "Sissyneck" and "Jack-Ass" singles in 1997 while the latter appeared in a re-recorded version on the 2002 album Sea Change.

== Deluxe edition ==
A deluxe edition was released on April 14, 2009, featuring 16 additional tracks, with 12 previously unreleased.
All songs written by Beck, except where noted.

17. "It's All in Your Mind"* – 2:54
18. "Whiskey Can Can"* (Beck, Calvin Johnson) – 2:12
19. "Mattress" – 2:31
20. "Woe on Me" – 3:10
21. "Teenage Wastebasket" (electric & band) – 2:28
22. "Your Love Is Weird" – 2:27
23. "Favorite Nerve" – 2:05
24. "Piss on the Door" – 2:05
25. "Close to God"† (Beck, Calvin Johnson) – 2:28
26. "Sweet Satan" – 1:45
27. "Burning Boyfriend" – 1:12
28. "Black Lake Morning" (Beck, Sam Jayne) – 2:25
29. "Feather in Your Cap"* – 1:13
30. "One Foot in the Grave" – 3:18
31. "Teenage Wastebasket" (acoustic) – 1:27
32. "I Get Lonesome" (alternate version) – 1:56

*Previously released on the 1995 7" K Records single "It's All in Your Mind".

†Previously released on the 1998 K Records compilation Selector Dub Narcotic (in a slightly different mix)

== Personnel ==
- Beck – bass, guitar, drums, vocals
- Calvin Johnson – vocals
- Chris Ballew – bass, guitar
- James Bertram – bass
- Sam Jayne – vocals
- Scott Plouf – drums
- Mario Prietto – bongos

== In film ==
Beck's cover of "He's a Mighty Good Leader" was featured in the 2003 film Holes, though it was not included on the soundtrack album.

== Covers ==
Tom Petty and the Heartbreakers would cover the track "Asshole" on the 1996 soundtrack album Songs and Music from "She's the One".
