= The Warlocks (EP) =

EP by the Warlocks
- Released: 2000
- Genres: Psychedelic rock; neo-psychedelia
- Length: 34:37
- Label: Bomp!
- Producers: Naut Human, David Deresinksi

The Warlocks chronology
The Warlocks (2000)	Rise and Fall (2001)

The Warlocks is the debut EP by American neo-psychedelic rock band the Warlocks, released in 2000 by record label Bomp!.

== Reception ==
AllMusic called the EP "wholly brilliant".

== Track listing ==
1. "Cocaine Blues"
2. "Song for Nico"
3. "Jam of the Zombies"
4. "Caveman Rock"
5. "Angry Demons"
6. "Jam of the Warlocks"
