= Forest for the Trees (album) =

Studio album by Forest for the Trees
- Released: September 9, 1997
- Studio: Carl's house; Wilcox Studios
- Length: 49:36
- Label: DreamWorks Records
- Producer: Carl Stephenson

Forest for the Trees chronology
Forest for the Trees (1997)	The Sound of Wet Paint (1999)

Singles from Forest for the Trees
- 1. "Dream" Released: 1997; 2. "Planet Unknown" Released: 1997

Forest for the Trees is the debut studio album by Forest for the Trees. It was released through DreamWorks Records on September 9, 1997. It peaked at number 190 on the Billboard 200 chart and number 16 on the Heatseekers Albums chart. "Dream" was released as a single, peaking at number 72 on the Billboard Hot 100 chart and number 18 on the Modern Rock Tracks chart.

== Background ==
Forest for the Trees' Carl Stephenson co-wrote and co-produced Beck's 1993 song "Loser". Signed to Geffen Records at that time, Stephenson submitted an entire album of songs. After recording the album, Stephenson was hospitalized with a mental illness. Stephenson, his family and the label thought it best not to release the album at the time. However, his health condition improved afterward and they thought that releasing the album would help him deal financially and emotionally with the healing process.

== Release ==
The album was released through DreamWorks Records, Geffen Records' sister label, on September 9, 1997. Prior to the release of the album, "Dream" was released as a single. Kevin Godley directed the music video for the song. In the music video, Stephenson was seen briefly in a still photograph.

== Critical reception ==
Professional ratings
Review scores
Source	Rating
AllMusic	3/5 stars
Christgau's Consumer Guide	A−
Entertainment Weekly	B−

Kembrew McLeod of AllMusic says, "Forest for the Trees tries to be everything at once and ends up being nothing at all, pleasing only those who favor 'interesting in theory' collage-oriented music over some semblance of catchy songs." Meanwhile, James Lien of CMJ New Music Report called Carl Stephenson "one of the key architects of the zeitgeist of the times." He said, "Stephenson creates a musical world where hip-hop beats blend with bagpipes and B-movie sitars, acoustic folk guitar strums, found vocal samples and hazy, dazed stoner raps."

== Track listing ==
No.	Title	Length
1.	"Dream"	5:10
2.	"Infinite Cow"	3:09
3.	"Fall"	4:31
4.	"You Create the Reason"	5:13
5.	"Tree"	4:20
6.	"Wet Paint"	3:56
7.	"Stream"	3:36
8.	"Ohm"	3:05
9.	"Algorithm"	4:28
10.	"Green Light Street"	4:19
11.	"Planet Unknown"	4:33
12.	"Thoughts in My Head"	3:16

== Personnel ==
Credits adapted from liner notes.

- Carl Stephenson – production, arrangement, recording, engineering, mixing
- John "Coz" Acosta – production, drum programming, guitar, vocals, engineering, mixing
- Bob Ludwig – mastering
- Melissa Komorsky – executive production, management
- Adam Katz – management assistance
- Tony Berg – A&R direction
- Thunk! – art direction
- Eleonora Ghioldi – photography
- Mark Schultz – front cover collage
- Mark Peterson – back cover painting

== Charts ==
Chart	Peak position
US Billboard 200	190
US Heatseekers Albums (Billboard)	16
