= A Western Harvest Field by Moonlight =

EP by Beck
- Released: January 1994
- Recorded: 1993
- Genre: Anti-folk; lo-fi; country
- Length: 22:46
- Label: Fingerpaint

Beck chronology
Golden Feelings (1993)	A Western Harvest Field by Moonlight (1994)	Stereopathetic Soulmanure (1994)

Professional ratings
Review scores
Source	Rating
AllMusic	3/5 stars
Encyclopedia of Popular Music	3/5 stars

A Western Harvest Field by Moonlight is a 1994 EP by the American musician Beck, released on 10" vinyl by Fingerpaint Records in January.

== Track listing ==
All songs written by Beck.

BIC SIDE

1. "Totally Confused" – 3:23
2. "Mayonaise Salad" – 1:08
3. "Gettin' Home" – 1:56
4. "Blackfire Choked Our Death" – 1:46
5. "Feel Like a Piece of Shit (Mind Control)" – 1:27
6. "She Is All (Gimme Something to Eat)" – 1:15

BEEK SIDE

1. "Pinefresh" – 1:23
2. "Lampshade" – 4:04
3. "Feel Like a Piece of Shit (Crossover Potential)" – 1:34
4. "Mango (Vader Rocks!)" – 2:49
5. "Feel Like a Piece of Shit (Cheetoes Time)" – 0:58
6. "Styrofoam Chicken (Quality Time)" – ∞
  - This track ends with a locked groove sound loop

== Notes ==
The album has been pressed 4 times:

1. 1994 – 3000 copies (included fingerpaintings made by Beck and his friends)
2. 1995 – 2000 copies
3. 1997 – 1000 copies
4. 1998 – 1000 copies

All pressings have the album title misprinted on the spine as A Western Harvest Moon by Moonlight.

Members of the Los Angeles band that dog., including violinist Petra Haden and her sister Rachel, feature on the first song "Totally Confused."

"Sexydeath Soda" is scratched on the vinyl on the Bic Side, and "Cherry Cupcake" is scratched on the Beek Side.
