= Skull Worship =

Studio album by the Warlocks
- Released: November 25, 2013
- Genre: Psychedelic rock
- Label: Zap Banana

The Warlocks chronology
The Mirror Explodes (2009)	Skull Worship (2013)	Songs from the Pale Eclipse (2016)

Skull Worship is the sixth studio album by American psychedelic rock band the Warlocks, released on November 25, 2013, by record label Zap Banana.

== Reception ==
Professional ratings
Aggregate scores
Source	Rating
Metacritic	68/100
Review scores
Source	Rating
AllMusic	4/5 stars
Austin Chronicle	2/5 stars
Chicago Tribune	3/4 stars
Drowned in Sound	7/10
Mojo	4/5 stars
NME	6/10
Q	3/5 stars
Uncut	4/5 stars
Vive Le Rock	6/10

Skull Worship has been generally well received by critics. AllMusic wrote: "the album is a well-crafted exercise in dark psychedelia, recalling the effectively minimal melodies and percussion of the Velvet Underground, the buzzy doomstruck tone of the Jesus and Mary Chain, and the layered guitar tones of My Bloody Valentine, while adding a sinister beauty that's unique to this band." Chicago Tribune wrote that the album is "the sound of the Warlocks finally burning out on the most inward-looking album of the band's career." Less favourable was Q, writing: "Though still intermittently thrilling, even they must be beginning to feel like it's time for a change."
