= It's All in Your Mind =

- 1995 single cover

Single by Beck

from the album One Foot in the Grave and Sea Change
- Released: 1995
- Genre: Alternative rock, anti-folk (original version); Folk rock (rerecording)
- Length: 2:56 (original); 3:06 (rerecording)
- Label: K
- Songwriter: Beck Hansen
- Producers: Beck Hansen (original version); Nigel Godrich (rerecording)

Beck singles chronology
"Beercan" (1995)	"It's All in Your Mind" (1995)	"Where It's At" (1996)

"It's All in Your Mind" is a single by Beck, released in 1995. Originally a non-album single, a more widely known rerecording was included on his album Sea Change.

The only song on Sea Change not to have been written following his break-up with Leigh Limon, "It's All in Your Mind" was recorded originally in mid-1993 for Beck's 1994 album, One Foot in the Grave, but Beck rejected it. Instead, he released it in 1995 on its own single, along with "Whiskey Can-Can" and "Feather in Your Cap", both of which were also outtakes. It was released again, this time in a live version from the Bridge School Concert of October 28, 1995.

The rerecording is the seventh track on Sea Change. It is perhaps one of the simplest songs on the album lyrically; many phrases are repeated, with 'I wanted to be' iterated nine times. It was included because during one session, Hansen began strumming the song randomly before starting a new song, before producer Nigel Godrich became ecstatic and suggested its outcome. Godrich and Beck were both impressed enough with the old song to put it on the album. The Sea Change version was described by Beck as an "evolved song".

"It's All in Your Mind" featured prominently in concerts between the years of 1994 and 1995, but largely disappeared before 2002. Unlike many of Beck's songs, the lyrics to "It's All in Your Mind" have stayed the same throughout performances. However, Beck replaced the two-chord strumming of the original version with more intricate finger-picking.

== Track listing ==
1. "It's All in Your Mind"
2. "Feather in Your Cap"
3. "Whiskey Can-Can"

All three songs on the single were included on the Japanese version of One Foot in the Grave and on the 2009 reissue of the album.
