= Phoenix (The Warlocks album) =

Studio album by the Warlocks
- Released: November 5, 2002
- Studios: Westbeach Recorders, Rotund Rascal, Catasonic Studios and The Distillery
- Genres: Psychedelic rock; neo-psychedelia
- Length: 64:02
- Label: Birdman

The Warlocks chronology
Phoenix (EP) (2002)	Phoenix (2002)	Surgery (2005)

Phoenix (also known as the Phoenix Album) is the second full-length album by American neo-psychedelic rock band the Warlocks. It was released in 2002 by record label Birdman, the band having been signed to this label following the success of their previous album, Rise and Fall.

The UK version was released by Mute in 2003, and featured a slightly different track listing and ordering, as well as an alternative cover. This version was accompanied by the release of "Shake the Dope Out" and "Baby Blue" as singles.

== Reception ==
Professional ratings
Aggregate scores
Source	Rating
Metacritic	66/100
Review scores
Source	Rating
AllMusic	4.5/5 stars
Drowned in Sound	9/10
The Guardian	4/5 stars
Pitchfork	2.0/10
Rolling Stone	3/5 stars
Spin	8/10
Uncut	4/5

The album received a largely positive critical response, being much compared to bands of the 1960s, such as the Velvet Underground. Critics also commented on the number of drug references in the lyrics.

== Track listing ==
1. "Shake the Dope Out" - 4:20
2. "Hurricane Heart Attack" - 5:36
3. "Baby Blue" - 3:59
4. "Stickman Blues" - 3:48
5. "Cosmic Letdown" - 9:26
6. "The Dope Feels Good" - 4:14
7. "Moving and Shaking" - 3:33
8. "Inside Outside" - 7:41
9. "Stone Hearts" - 7:05
10. "Oh Shadie" - 14:17

UK version

1. "Shake the Dope Out" - 4:20
2. "Hurricane Heart Attack" - 5:33
3. "Inside Outside" - 7:37
4. "Isolation" - 5:16
5. "Cosmic Letdown" - 9:28
6. "Red Rooster" - 5:34
7. "Baby Blue" - 3:52
8. "The Dope Feels Good" - 4:12
9. "Stickman Blues" - 3:56
10. "Oh Shadie" - 14:13
