= The Warlocks =

American rock band

- Origin: Los Angeles, California, United States
- Genres: Psychedelic rock; neo-psychedelia; shoegaze; drone
- Years active: 1998–present
- Labels: Cleopatra Records; Bomp!; Birdman; Mute; City Rockers; Tee Pee; Cargo; Zap Banana
- Members: Bobby Hecksher; John Christian Rees; Earl V. Miller; Christopher DiPino; George Serrano; Jason Anchondo
- Past members: Ryan McBride; Bob Mustachio; Jenny Fraser; Jana Risher; Mimi Sato; Corey Lee Granet; Jeff Levitz; Jennifer Chiba; Caleb Sweazy; Laura Grigsby; Hunter Crowley; Bobby Tamkin; Anton Newcombe; Theresa Saso; Danny Hole; Bobby Martine
- Website: www.thewarlocks.com

The Warlocks are an American rock band formed in Los Angeles, California, in 1998 by the guitarist/singer Bobby Hecksher. The band's music has ranged from psychedelic rock to drone music. There have been many changes in personnel since its formation, with Hecksher the only constant member.

== History ==
=== Formation and signing to Bomp! ===
The band was founded in 1998 in Los Angeles by Bobby Hecksher, adopting a name used by both the Velvet Underground and the Grateful Dead in their early days. At the age of fifteen, Hecksher moved to Los Angeles from Florida with his family. Hecksher's first instrument was cello, eventually moving on to bass guitar. Hecksher's grandfather owned a radio station.

In the years before the formation of the band, Hecksher was busy with a number of other projects in Los Angeles, including Charles Brown Superstar, Don Knotts Overdrive (Hecksher left DKO in 1995 and the band eventually changed its name to Head Set due to legal threats from the actual Don Knotts), and Magic Pacer, played bass guitar with Beck on the Stereopathic Soulmanure album and also with The Brian Jonestown Massacre for a brief period.

The Warlocks played their first gig on July 4, 1998. Receiving comparisons with White Light/White Heat-era Velvet Underground and Spacemen 3, the band signed a two-album deal with the renowned indie label Bomp! in October 2000. Supposedly signed in Hecksher's blood, the contract with Bomp! yielded the band's first release in 2000, the mini-album The Warlocks. This was followed by the release of its first full-length record, Rise and Fall, in 2001. Rise and Fall received a four-and-a-half-star review from AllMusic, with Bryan Thomas describing it as a "solid effort". Hecksher worked as a games tester for DreamWorks until at least 2001.

=== Birdman and Mute contracts ===
After the release of Rise and Fall the band left Bomp! and signed with Birdman Records. The EP Phoenix was released by Birdman in 2002 and was followed by a full-length album also called Phoenix, which was also released in 2002, to positive acclaim. Phoenix included a collaboration with Peter Kember (Sonic Boom), of Spacemen 3 and Spectrum, on the song "Hurricane Heart Attack". "Shake the Dope Out" and "Baby Blue" were also released as singles. The group toured the US and overseas with Black Rebel Motorcycle Club, the Raveonettes and Interpol.

Following Phoenix, the Warlocks signed to Mute and released Surgery in 2005, produced by Tom Rothrock. The record represents a departure from their earlier psychedelic sound into dreamier pop territory, while retaining the band's hard-edged brand of rock. The songs on this record are shorter and more structured than some of their previous work. "Come Save Us" was released as a single. Surgery received a mixed reception from critics; A PopMatters review by Stephen Haag rated it at 6 out of 10, while a Pitchfork review gave the album only a 1.7 out of 10 rating, with Nick Sylvester describing the album as "A mopey bunch of trite sap O.D.-type tales almost as unstomachable as the band's former crapothecary hymns." Prefix gave the album 8.0 out of 10, describing it as "far more approachable" than their earlier releases. The album's lack of commercial success led to the end of their deal with Mute.

=== Later releases ===
In the years after Surgery, the band toured internationally and sustained changes to the lineup, leading up to the 2007 release of Heavy Deavy Skull Lover on Tee Pee. The album was, according to Hecksher, recorded over a single weekend, with the band members quitting afterwards. The album is considered darker than their previous work, with the band exploring a more experimental direction. A review in Spin described the album as "funereal" and "sluggishly unrealised", while AllMusic called it "uneven". Heavy Deavy Skull Lover was recorded as a four-piece and marks a brief hiatus from the band for founding member John Christian Rees, who later returned before work began on their 2009 album, The Mirror Explodes. The Mirror Explodes was released in 2009 by Tee Pee. Production of the record was assisted by Joey Santiago of the Pixies.

The years following The Mirror Explodes saw two online releases by the band, available through Bandcamp, as well as a reissue of Rise and Fall via Zap Banana/Cargo in October 2010 which included previously unreleased rarities and artwork by Darren Grealish. The first of the online releases, the highly experimental EXP, was released on January 1, 2010. The second, Enter At Your Own Skull: Unreleased Volume One, a compilation of B-sides, demos and outtakes, was released on June 9, 2011. Besides the online releases and Rise and Fall reissue, the years after The Mirror Explodes were filled with intermittent touring and more line-up changes, resulting in the band solidifying as a five-piece.

The band provided another commercial release in 2013 with Skull Worship, also via Zap Banana/Cargo (distribution). Skull Worship was released on November 26, 2013.

The Warlocks' seventh studio album, Songs from the Pale Eclipse, was released on September 2. A single, "Lonesome Bulldog", was released in promotion for the album in June 2016.

The Warlocks' eighth studio album, Mean Machine Music, was released on May 31, 2019.

The Warlocks' ninth studio album, The Chain, was released on April 3, 2020.

The Warlocks' tenth studio album, In Between Sad was released on September 22, 2023.

== Musical style ==
The band's music has been described as psychedelic rock. In 2008, Hecksher said of the band's sound "...even though it's seemingly chaotic, achieving our sound is a really specific process. We need all these big, hollow-bodied guitars going through old Fender amps with reverb, or it won’t work."

In 2007, the bass guitarist Jenny Fraser described the songwriting process: "Hecksher writes the skeleton of the songs and everyone writes their own parts. He always draws the picture and we paint it in."

Hecksher acknowledges influences including The Velvet Underground, Spacemen 3, Spiritualized and The Jesus and Mary Chain.

== Personnel ==
Current members

- Bobby Hecksher – vocals, guitar, keyboards, bass guitar
- John Christian Rees – guitar, feedback
- Earl V. Miller – guitar, drone machine
- Marlena Schwenck – bass guitar
- Oscar Ruvalcaba – drums
- Rob Campanella – organ
- Elina Yakubova – tambourine & percussion

Former members

- Christopher DiPino – bass guitar
- Jason Anchondo – drums
- Ryan McBride – guitar
- Bob Mustachio – drums
- Suzanne Jana Risher – bass guitar
- Mimi Star – bass guitar
- Bobby Martine – bass guitar
- Jenny Fraser – bass guitar
- Corey Lee Granet – guitar, piano
- Jeff Levitz – guitar, lap steel, sitar
- Jen Chiba – bass guitar
- Caleb Sweazy – bass guitar, acoustic guitar
- Laura Grigsby – organ, tambourine
- George Serrano – drums
- Hunter Crowley – drums
- Bobby Tamkin – drums
- Anton Newcombe – drums
- Theresa Saso – drums
- Danny Hole – drums

== Discography ==
Studio albums

Release date	Album	Label
October 16, 2001	Rise and Fall	Bomp!
November 5, 2002	Phoenix	Birdman; Mute
August 23, 2005	Surgery	Mute
October 23, 2007	Heavy Deavy Skull Lover	Tee Pee
May 19, 2009	The Mirror Explodes	Tee Pee
November 26, 2013	Skull Worship	Zap Banana; Cargo
September 2, 2016	Songs from the Pale Eclipse	Cleopatra
May 31, 2019	Mean Machine Music	Cleopatra
April 3, 2020	The Chain	Cleopatra
September 9, 2023	In Between Sad	Cleopatra
August 1, 2025	The Manic Excessive Sounds Of	Cleopatra

Live albums

Release date	Album	Label
October 13, 2017	Vevey	Cleopatra
Sept 9, 2020	The Warlocks: Live at Webster Hall 2006	Fuzz Club

Online albums and compilations

Release date	Album/EP	Label
January 1, 2010	EXP	Bandcamp
October 25, 2010	Rise and Fall: EP and Rarities	Zap Banana; Cargo
June 9, 2011	Enter At Your Own Skull: Unreleased Volume One	Bandcamp
May 9, 2019	Enter At Your Own Skull: Unreleased Volume Two	Bandcamp

Mini-albums/EPs

Release date	Album/EP	Label
November 11, 2000	The Warlocks	Bomp!
August 13, 2002	Phoenix	Birdman
June 25, 2019	Skull Worship Lost Gems EP	Bandcamp

Singles

- "Baby Blue" (2003), Mute
- "Shake the Dope Out" (2003), Mute
- "Hurricane Heart Attack" (2003), City Rockers
- "It's Just Like Surgery" (2005), Mute
- "Come Save Us" (2005), Mute
- "Isolation"/"Red Camera" (2006), Bomp!
