= Mellow Gold =

1994 studio album by Beck

Studio album by Beck
- Released: March 1, 1994
- Recorded: 1992–1993
- Genres: Alternative rock; anti-folk; experimental rock; lo-fi
- Length: 47:31 (with hidden track)
- Labels: DGC; Bong Load
- Producers: Beck Hansen; Tom Rothrock; Rob Schnapf; Carl Stephenson

Beck chronology
Stereopathetic Soulmanure (1994)	Mellow Gold (1994)	One Foot in the Grave (1994)

Singles from Mellow Gold
- 1. "Loser" Released: February 4, 1994; 2. "Pay No Mind (Snoozer)" Released: April 1994; 3. "Beercan" Released: 1994

Mellow Gold is the third studio album by American musician Beck, released on March 1, 1994, by DGC Records as Beck's major label debut album. Critics noted the album's hybrid of various styles including rock, hip-hop, folk, blues, psychedelia, and country, as well as ironic and witty lyrics. Mellow Gold's anti-commercial attitude led to the album becoming an unexpected commercial success, peaking at number thirteen in the United States, and eventually being certified platinum. As of July 2008, Mellow Gold has sold over 1.2 million copies in the United States.

== Background ==
In a 1994 interview with Rolling Stone, Beck said of the album:

The whole concept of Mellow Gold is that it's like a satanic K-tel record that's been found in a trash dumpster, quite matter-of-factly. A few people have molested it and slept with it and half-swallowed it before spitting it out. Someone played poker with it, someone tried to smoke it. Then the record was taken to Morocco and covered with hummus and tabouli. Then it was flown back to a convention of water-skiers, who skied on it and played Frisbee with it. Then the record was put on the turntable, and the original K-Tel album had reached a whole new level. I was just taking that whole Freedom Rock feeling, you understand.

According to the album's liner notes, Mellow Gold was recorded at Carl Stephenson and Rob Schnapf's houses, predominantly utilizing a four-track.

== Album cover ==
The robot on the cover of Mellow Gold was created by artist Eddie Lopez, who made a cameo in the music video for the hit song "Loser". The sculpture was named "Survivor from the Nuclear Bomb". The shot was originally taken in Lopez's garage space by Beck's friend as well as early collaborator Ross Harris. The last image was reshot in a studio where Harris was able to control the environment and also add visual effects to make the cover look more apocalyptic.

== Title ==
The album was originally going to be titled Cold Ass Fashion, sharing its name with an earlier song of Beck's. The final title used, Mellow Gold, was named after a potent strain of California marijuana.

== Reception ==
Professional ratings
Initial reviews (in 1994)
Review scores
Source	Rating
Chicago Tribune	3/4 stars
Entertainment Weekly	B
Los Angeles Times	3/4 stars
Music Week	3/5 stars
Rolling Stone	3.5/5 stars
Select	3/5 medals
The Village Voice	A

Professional ratings
Retrospective reviews (after 1994)
Review scores
Source	Rating
AllMusic	5/5 stars
Blender	4/5 stars
Pitchfork	8.8/10
The Rolling Stone Album Guide	5/5 stars
Spin Alternative Record Guide	10/10

Mellow Gold received general acclaim from music critics. AllMusic and Rolling Stone gave it five out of five stars (the latter originally giving it only three and a half).

AllMusic critic Stephen Thomas Erlewine wrote, "although his inspired sense of humor occasionally plays like he's a smirking, irony-addled hipster, his music is never kitschy, and his wordplay is constantly inspired." He also wrote, "It's a dizzying demonstration of musical skills, yet it's all tied together by a simple yet clever sense of songcraft and a truly original lyrical viewpoint, one that's basic yet as colorful as free verse."

Guitar World magazine included Mellow Gold in their "Superunknown: 50 Iconic Albums That Defined 1994" list.

== Track listing ==
All tracks are written by Beck Hansen, except where noted.

No.	Title	Writer(s)	Length
1.	"Loser"	Hansen, Carl Stephenson	3:55
2.	"Pay No Mind (Snoozer)"		3:15
3.	"Fuckin with My Head (Mountain Dew Rock)"		3:41
4.	"Whiskeyclone, Hotel City 1997"		3:28
5.	"Soul Suckin' Jerk"	Hansen, Stephenson	3:57
6.	"Truckdrivin Neighbors Downstairs (Yellow Sweat)"		2:55
7.	"Sweet Sunshine"	Hansen, Stephenson	4:14
8.	"Beercan"	Hansen, Stephenson	4:00
9.	"Steal My Body Home"		5:34
10.	"Nitemare Hippy Girl"		2:55
11.	"Mutherfuker"		2:04
12.	"Blackhole" (includes hidden track, "Analog Odyssey", which begins at 5:49)		7:33
Total length:			47:31

=== Samples credits ===
"Loser"
"Loser" by Beck

==== "Loser" ====
- "I Walk on Guilded Splinters" by Johnny Jenkins
- Kill the Moonlight dialogue

==== "Fuckin with My Head (Mountain Dew Rock)" ====
- "Save the World" by Southside Movement

==== "Soul Suckin' Jerk" ====
- "The Big Beat" by Billy Squier
- "Cow" by Melvins

==== "Sweet Sunshine" ====
- "Save the World" by Southside Movement

==== "Beercan" ====
- "Hog Leg" by Melvins
- Care Bears dialogue

== Personnel ==
- Beck – vocals, acoustic guitar, slide guitar, electric guitar, bass, harmonica, synthesizers, percussion, producer
- Mike Boito – organ (track 8)
- Stephen Marcussen – mastering
- Tom Rothrock – producer, mixing
- Rob Schnapf – producer, mixing
- Carl Stephenson – producer, beats, sampling, sitar (track 1)
- Petra Haden – violin (track 12)
- David Harte – drums (tracks 2, 10, 11)
- Rob Zabrecky – bass (track 12)
- Robert Fisher – art direction, design
- Ross Harris – photography
- Mike O'Connor – drums

== Charts ==
=== Weekly charts ===
Chart (1994)	Peak position
Australian Albums (ARIA)	53
Austrian Albums (Ö3 Austria)	25
Dutch Albums (Album Top 100)	81
German Albums (Offizielle Top 100)	41
New Zealand Albums (RMNZ)	23
Norwegian Albums (VG-lista)	18
Swedish Albums (Sverigetopplistan)	15
Swiss Albums (Schweizer Hitparade)	33
UK Albums (Official Charts)	41
US Billboard 200	13

=== Year-end charts ===
Chart (1994)	Position
US Billboard 200	94

== Certifications ==
Region	Certification	Certified units/sales
Canada (Music Canada)	Platinum	100,000^{^}
United Kingdom (BPI)	Gold	100,000^{*}
United States (RIAA)	Platinum	1,200,000
^{*} Sales figures based on certification alone.^{^} Shipments figures based on certification alone.
