= Sea Change (album) =

Studio album by Beck
- Released: September 24, 2002
- Recorded: March–May 2002
- Studios: Ocean Way, Hollywood; Record One, Los Angeles
- Genres: Folk rock; country rock; chamber pop
- Length: 52:24
- Label: Geffen
- Producer: Nigel Godrich

Beck chronology
Beck (2001)	Sea Change (2002)	Guero (2005)

Singles from Sea Change
- 1. "Lost Cause" Released: 2002; 2. "Guess I'm Doing Fine" Released: 2002

Sea Change is the eighth studio album by American musician Beck, released on September 24, 2002, by Geffen Records. Recorded over a two-month period in Los Angeles with producer Nigel Godrich, the album features themes of heartbreak and desolation, solitude, and loneliness. For the album, much of Beck's trademark cryptic and ironic lyrics were replaced by simpler, more sincere lyrics. He also eschewed the heavy sampling of his previous albums for live instrumentation. Beck cited the breakup with his longtime girlfriend as the major influence on the album.

Sea Change peaked at number 8 on the Billboard 200, later being certified gold in 2005 by the RIAA. It was met with favorable responses from critics, who considered Beck's transition from eccentric, sonically experimental work to emotional balladry to be successful and convincing. The album later appeared in many publications' lists of the best albums of the 2000s, and it remains one of Beck's best-reviewed recordings.

In 2014, Beck released the album Morning Phase, described in a press release as a "companion piece" to Sea Change, featuring the same personnel who performed on it with the exception of Godrich.

"Lost Cause" and "Guess I'm Doing Fine" were released as promotional-only singles.

== Background ==
Following Beck's tour for his Midnite Vultures album, Beck and his fiancée, stylist Leigh Limon, ended their nine-year relationship. Three weeks before Beck's 30th birthday, he was told Limon had allegedly been having an affair with a member of Los Angeles band Whiskey Biscuit. Limon denied the allegation but was convinced to sign contracts that dissolved her relationship with Beck in the presence of Sea Org members from the Church of Scientology. Beck lapsed into a period of melancholy and introspection, during which he wrote the bleak, acoustic-based tracks on Sea Change. He wrote most of the album's 12 songs in one week, but shelved them. "Songs sit in my head for a while," he told Time in 2002. "I have dozens in there, songs from eight years ago that I've written but never recorded. After a while, I just sort of decide to record them." Beck had also strayed from the songs to keep from talking about his personal life, as well as to focus on music and "not really strew my baggage across the public lobby." Eventually, however, he found the songs speak to an experience (a relationship breakup) that is common, and that it would not seem self-indulgent to record them. In 2001, Beck drifted back to the songs and reteamed with his producer for Mutations, Nigel Godrich.

Beck intended to record the album in late 2001, but due to the September 11 attacks, "it took a while for people to line up." Before working with Godrich, Beck recorded tracks with Dan "The Automator" Nakamura in January 2002 in preparation for the new record, but no songs from those sessions were used for Sea Change. Many songs, such as "Lost Cause", were performed live prior to the album's recording. Another new song, "Evil Things", was also performed and demoed but ultimately not recorded for the album, due to loss of time. Regarding the performances of more personal tracks in the days before Sea Change, Beck explained in a 2008 interview that "Those were the kinds of songs I would play in the middle of the show. I'd try to throw a couple of them in. I just remember the audience kind of disregarding them, or moshing, or throwing things. Just because those were the kinds of persons that came out."

== Recording and production ==
Beck and his group of musicians entered the studio with intentions to make the record an acoustic-based offering, in the vein of those for his emotive 1998 disc Mutations. Early in the recording process, Beck told Godrich that he was hoping to record one track per day, similar to the process of Mutations. However, each song ended up taking at least two days to record, due to orchestral arrangements. Musical partners in the studio included drummer James Gadson, and guitarist Jason Falkner, as well as longtime musical partners, keyboardist Roger Joseph Manning Jr., bassist Justin Meldal-Johnsen, drummer Joey Waronker, guitarist Smokey Hormel, and cellist Suzie Katayama. In addition, Beck's father, David Campbell, provided string arrangements. Joey Waronker left mid-way through recording for Hawaii; James Gadson filled in for him the remaining days.

Recording began as soon as the band entered Ocean Way Studios in Los Angeles on March 6, 2002. Much of Sea Change was recorded live, with extra effects (including bells and strings) added later. In order to capture the immediacy of the material, the artists worked quickly and spontaneously, frequently laying second takes of songs to disc. During production, Beck realized his singing voice had gotten significantly deeper. "Before we recorded," said Godrich, "We listened to Mutations, and his voice sounded like Mickey Mouse. His range has dropped. Now when he opens his mouth, a canyonesque vibration comes out. It's quite remarkable. He has amazing tone."

By the end of production, the group of musicians had to work faster than they intended. "We kind of ran out of time at the end," said Beck. "Joni Mitchell was coming in to do her record, but she works very civilized and she takes the weekend off, so we were sneaking in on the weekends and trying to finish." Eventually, recording lasted a little over three weeks and the album was mixed from there on, which was completed May 7. At one session, Beck began strumming his 1995 single "It's All in Your Mind" randomly before beginning a new song, and Godrich became ecstatic, remarking "We have to do that." The strikingly different re-recorded version appears on Sea Change as an "evolved song", according to Beck.

"Ship in the Bottle" was the only completed track left off the record. "That was the super-pop song of the record," said Beck in a 2002 interview. "I think it was a little too corny. I mean, it was heartfelt, but since then people have been telling me they really liked it. I think we felt that the album was so long already. I don't know what the fate of that will be." "Ship in the Bottle" was released on the Japanese version of Sea Change and later remasters.

== Composition ==
Sea Change is based around a musical suite of reflective, acoustic-based songs that showcase Beck's singer-songwriter side. The term sea change is defined as a broad transformation, which reflects the departure in style from both Beck's previous effort Midnite Vultures and previous, sample-based recordings, as well as Beck's desire to give each album an identity. Origins for the album's unique, passionate sound had been building up for years, according to Beck in a 2002 interview: "There are threads of what I've done before. If you listen to my earlier B- sides, you'll hear this record. I have been wanting to make this record for years," he explained. "I've been edging towards the idea, and so it just took a while." Despite initial difficulty upon deciding on the name, the title originates from "Little One", the eleventh track on the album: "Drown, drown / Sailors run aground / In a sea change nothing is safe".

The recordings from the Sea Change sessions include themes of heartbreak and desolation, solitude and loneliness. Although often compared to Mutations, Beck himself regarded the album, in a 2008 interview, as more representative of his 1994 album One Foot in the Grave and "more representative of what I was doing [in the early days]."

The album's sound, particularly on the song "Paper Tiger", was partially inspired by that of Serge Gainsbourg's album Histoire de Melody Nelson (1971). Beck would later produce and collaborate with Gainsbourg's daughter Charlotte on her 2009 album IRM. James Jackson Toth of Stereogum also compared the acoustic and relaxed melodies of Sea Change to the works of British singer-songwriter Nick Drake and Bob Dylan's 1975 album Blood on the Tracks.

== Promotion and release ==
Before release, retailers worried about the commercial impact of Sea Change due to its sound. Analysts predicted the album would not receive heavy radio support, noting that Beck's reputation, critical acclaim and the possibility of multiple Grammy nominations might offset an uncommercial sound. "It's a really beautiful album, but it's going to appeal to a different audience than he's had before," said Vince Szydlowski, senior director of product for the Virgin Megastore chain, shortly before the release of Sea Change. "If you're used to the 'two turntables and a microphone' Beck, then this isn't the record for you. I think it'll go gold, but it'll struggle beyond gold." The album's release date was announced May 31, 2002. In addition, the album's initial track listing was also released, featuring songs in a very different order than their final version, as well as including the track "Ship in the Bottle". The album's title was announced in August 2002. In promotion of the record, new tracks from the record were released in chronological order by track listing weekly through Beck's website in July and August, 2002.

Sea Change was released on September 24, 2002. The album was re-released in a remastered form by Mobile Fidelity Sound Lab in June 2009.

Several music videos were released to promote the album, including ones for "Golden Age", "Lonesome Tears", "Guess I'm Doing Fine", "Little One", and two versions of "Lost Cause".

== Artwork ==
All four different album covers released for Sea Change.

Sea Change was released with four different album covers, each version containing distinct digital artwork by Jeremy Blake on the CD and the booklet. There were also different hidden messages (lyrical snippets) written under each version's CD tray.

The original cover art for the album was used as an effigy in the music video for lead single "Lost Cause".

== Reception ==
Professional ratings
Aggregate scores
Source	Rating
Metacritic	79/100
Review scores
Source	Rating
AllMusic	5/5 stars
Blender	4/5 stars
Entertainment Weekly	B+
The Guardian	3/5 stars
NME	6/10
Pitchfork	6.9/10
Q	4/5 stars
Rolling Stone	5/5 stars
Spin	9/10
The Village Voice	B

=== Critical ===
In a five-star review, Rolling Stone critic David Fricke wrote that Sea Change was "the best album Beck has ever made, and it sounds like he's paid dearly for the achievement." Rolling Stone went on to name it the best album of 2002. In 2012, the album was ranked number 436 on the magazine's list of the 500 greatest albums of all time. It was ranked number 17 on Rolling Stone's list of the 100 best albums of the 2000s.

=== Commercial ===
Sea Change peaked at No. 8 on Billboard's Top 200 chart and was eventually certified gold in March 2005. In the UK charts, it peaked at No. 20. As of July 2008, Sea Change had sold 680,000 copies in the United States.

== Tour ==
Sea Change yielded many tours in support, the first of which began as a low-key, theatre-based acoustic tour in August 2002. Each show gave a playful, energetic atmosphere, with Beck telling jokes in between performances, and a surprise appearance by Jack White of the White Stripes at the August 11 show, which MTV News described as getting "a standing ovation from the sold-out crowd of college kids and beatniks." A larger tour was planned for October 2002, with the Flaming Lips as opening band, as well as Beck's backing band. The tour began in October and ended in November 2002.

During the touring for Sea Change, Beck varied the set list and experimented with song structures, changing the arrangements each night as a way to break away from predictability. True to Beck's desire for re-interpretation of songs, he dismissed both his longtime touring band and the group he worked with for Sea Change shortly before touring began. Between new and old original songs at each concert, Beck performed many improvisational covers, such as "No Expectations" by the Rolling Stones, Big Star's "Kangaroo", the Zombies' "Beechwood Park" and "Sunday Morning" by the Velvet Underground. David Fricke of Rolling Stone called the live covers "breathtaking", adding that they were "a perfect fit — songs about commitment and loss, written and sung by the wounded."

== Track listing ==
All lyrics are written by Beck; all music is composed by Beck.

Sea Change
No.	Title	Length
1.	"The Golden Age"	4:35
2.	"Paper Tiger"	4:36
3.	"Guess I'm Doing Fine"	4:50
4.	"Lonesome Tears"	5:38
5.	"Lost Cause"	3:48
6.	"End of the Day"	5:04
7.	"It's All in Your Mind"	3:06
8.	"Round the Bend"	5:16
9.	"Already Dead"	2:59
10.	"Sunday Sun"	4:45
11.	"Little One"	4:27
12.	"Side of the Road"	3:24
Total length:		52:26

Bonus tracks
No.	Title	Length
13.	"Ship in the Bottle"	3:13
Total length:		55:39

== Personnel ==
Musicians

- Beck Hansen – vocals (tracks 1–12), acoustic guitar (tracks 1, 3, 5–12), synth (tracks 1, 3, 7), glockenspiel (tracks 1, 10), harmonica (track 3), background vocals (tracks 3, 5, 10–11), keyboards (track 4), banjo (track 5), percussion (tracks 5, 10–11), electric guitar (tracks 7, 10–11), Wurlitzer (track 7), piano (track 10)
- Justin Meldal-Johnsen – electric bass (tracks 1–4, 6, 9–11), background vocals (tracks 3, 5, 11), electric guitar (track 4), upright bass (tracks 5, 7–8, 10, 12), glockenspiel (tracks 5, 10), percussion (tracks 5, 10–11), piano (track 10)
- Roger Joseph Manning Jr. – synth (tracks 1, 5, 7, 10), Wurlitzer (tracks 1, 7, 10, 12), glockenspiel (track 1), piano (tracks 3, 10–11), Clavinet (tracks 3, 5–6, 10–11), background vocals (tracks 3, 5, 11), percussion (tracks 5, 10–11), harmonium (track 10), banjo (track 10), Indian banjo (track 10)
- Smokey Hormel – electric guitar (tracks 1, 3, 5, 7, 10), acoustic guitar (tracks 4, 5, 7, 9), percussion (tracks 5, 10), background vocals (track 5), acoustic slide guitar (tracks 6, 10, 12), piano (track 10), bamboo saxophone (track 10), megamouth (track 10), tape recorder (track 10)
- Joey Waronker – drums (tracks 1, 3, 5, 7, 10–12), percussion (tracks 1–7, 10–12), background vocals (tracks 3, 11), beatbox drums (track 10)
- James Gadson – drums (tracks 2, 4, 6, 9)
- Jason Falkner – electric guitar (tracks 2, 11), background vocals (track 11), percussion (track 11)
- Nigel Godrich – keyboards (tracks 2, 4, 6), percussion (track 2), synth (track 3)
- Suzie Katayama – cello (track 7)

Technical

- David Campbell – string arranger (tracks 2, 4, 8), conductor (tracks 2, 4, 8)
- Nigel Godrich – string treatment (track 8), producer, engineer, mixing
- Darrell Thorp – assistant engineer
- Bob Ludwig – mastering
- Autumn de Wilde – cover photo
- Jeremy Blake – artwork
- Kevin Reagan – art direction, design
- Beck Hansen – string arranger (track 8), art direction, design
- Ekaterina Kenney – Geffen creative
- Elliot Scheiner – SACD/DVD-A surround sound mix

== Charts ==
=== Weekly charts ===
Weekly chart performance for Sea Change by Beck
Chart (2002)	Peak position
Australian Albums (ARIA)	15
Austrian Albums (Ö3 Austria)	34
Belgian Albums (Ultratop Flanders)	16
Belgian Albums (Ultratop Wallonia)	35
Canadian Albums (Billboard)	5
Danish Albums (Hitlisten)	6
Dutch Albums (Album Top 100)	53
Finnish Albums (Suomen virallinen lista)	23
French Albums (SNEP)	13
German Albums (Offizielle Top 100)	38
New Zealand Albums (RMNZ)	26
Norwegian Albums (VG-lista)	1
Swedish Albums (Sverigetopplistan)	46
Swiss Albums (Schweizer Hitparade)	30
UK Albums (Official Charts)	20
US Billboard 200	8

=== Year-end charts ===
Year-end chart performance for Sea Change by Beck
Chart (2002)	Position
Canadian Albums (Nielsen SoundScan)	195
Canadian Alternative Albums (Nielsen SoundScan)	63

== Certifications ==
Region	Certification	Certified units/sales
Australia (ARIA)	Gold	35,000^{‡}
Canada (Music Canada)	Gold	50,000^{^}
United Kingdom (BPI)	Silver	90,000
United States (RIAA)	Gold	680,000
^{^} Shipments figures based on certification alone.^{‡} Sales+streaming figures based on certification alone.

== Release history ==
Region	Date	Label	Format	Catalog	Ref
Various	September 24, 2002	Geffen	Digital download	—	
Argentina	September 24, 2002	Geffen	CD	493393-2	
Australia	September 24, 2002	Geffen	CD	4933932-A	
Canada	September 24, 2002	Geffen	CD	B00006F7S4	
Europe	September 24, 2002	Geffen	CD	493 393-2	
Japan	September 24, 2002	Geffen	CD	493 393-2	
United Kingdom	September 24, 2002	Geffen	CD	B00006F7S4	
United States	September 24, 2002	Geffen	CD	069493393	
United States	September 24, 2002	Geffen	LP	B0004372-01	
United States	September 24, 2002	Geffen	SACD	069493537 2	
United States	December 16, 2003	Geffen	DVD-A	B0001840-19	
United States	June 30, 2009	Mobile Fidelity Sound Lab	CD	UDCD 780	
United States	June 30, 2009	Mobile Fidelity Sound Lab	LP	MFSL 2-308	
