= Songs from the Pale Eclipse =

Studio album by the Warlocks
- Released: September 2, 2016
- Genre: Psychedelic rock
- Length: 44:42
- Label: Cleopatra

The Warlocks chronology
Skull Worship (2013)	Songs from the Pale Eclipse (2016)	Vevey (2017)

Professional ratings
Aggregate scores
Source	Rating
Metacritic	61/100
Review scores
Source	Rating
AllMusic	3.5/5 stars
Drowned in Sound	8/10
MusicOMH	3/5 stars

Songs from the Pale Eclipse is the seventh studio album by The Warlocks. The album was released on Cleopatra Records in September 2016.

== Track listing ==
No.	Title	Length
1.	"Only You"	4:02
2.	"Lonesome Bulldog"	3:25
3.	"Easy to Forget"	4:42
4.	"Dance Alone"	6:00
5.	"We Took All the Acid"	3:47
6.	"Love is a Disease"	3:31
7.	"Drinking Song"	5:09
8.	"Special Today"	4:33
9.	"I Warned You"	5:05
10.	"The Arp Made Me Cry"	4:28

== Personnel ==
The Warlocks

- Bobby Hecksher - Composer, Bass, Guitar, Keyboards, Liner Notes, Producer, Vocals, Harmonica
- Josh Garza - Drums
- Earl V. Miller - Guitar
- Chris Di Pino - Bass
- John Christian Rees - Guitar, Percussion
- George Serrano - Drums

Technical/Design

- Rod Cervera - Engineer, Mixing, Producer
- Eric Debris - Mastering
- Adam Lathrum - Engineer, Mixing
- Stefan Lirakis - Engineer
- Jon Siebels - Engineer
- Matt Green - A&R
- Steven Olmos - Layout Design, Photography
- Korrin Jasmine Stoney - Cover Art
