= Guess I'm Doing Fine =

Single by Beck

from the album Sea Change
- Released: 2002
- Length: 4:49
- Label: Geffen
- Songwriter(s): Beck Hansen
- Producer(s): Beck Hansen

Beck singles chronology
"Lost Cause" (2002)	"Guess I'm Doing Fine" (2002)	"E-Pro" (2005)

"Guess I'm Doing Fine" is a single by Beck from his fifth major-label album, Sea Change.

== Music video ==
The video was directed by Spike Jonze and produced by Emma Wilcockson. Beck is thrown an acoustic guitar by an anonymous person that is not seen in the video. He sits down on what presumably is a white rock next to a tree and handles his guitar. He walks around with his guitar. He sits down to eat a sandwich, and eventually gets back up. His guitar follows him, even though he is not touching it. Beck is now sitting next to a tree again, and starts a conversation with a man playing soccer. The man sits down, and eventually Beck is playing soccer with the rest of the people. Later when he finishes, he continues walking on the sidewalk.

== Critical reception ==
The song received positive reviews from critics. Rolling Stone remarked on "the low, slow way" that Beck "sings on his way to the song's punch line", given as, "It's only tears that I'm crying/It's only you that I'm losing/Guess I'm doing fine." Rolling Stone said this was "a powerful admission of failure" in Beck's broken relationship with his longtime girlfriend. E! Online also gave the song a positive review, saying it was one of the highlights of the album.

== Personnel ==
- Beck: vocals, acoustic guitar, synthesizer, harmonica, background vocals
- Joey Waronker: drums, percussion, background vocals
- Justin Meldal-Johnsen: electric bass, background vocals
- Smokey Hormel: electric guitar
- Roger Manning: piano, clavinet, background vocals
- Nigel Godrich: synthesizer
