= Stuart Smalley =

Fictional character created by Al Franken

- Al Franken as Stuart Smalley
- First appearance: Saturday Night Live; February 9, 1991
- Portrayed by: Al Franken

In-universe information
- Occupation: Host of Daily Affirmations with Stuart Smalley

Stuart Smalley is a fictional character created and performed by comedian and satirist Al Franken on the television show Saturday Night Live.

== Character history ==
Stuart Smalley first appeared on the February 9, 1991 Saturday Night Live episode hosted by Kevin Bacon in a sketch styled as a mock self-help show called "Daily Affirmations With Stuart Smalley." The character was named after Franken, whose middle name is Stuart. Franken has stated that his "going to Al-Anon meetings inspired [the character] Stuart [Smalley]".

== Saturday Night Live sketches ==
Stuart participates in many (sometimes fictional) programs, not limited to Overeaters Anonymous, Children of Alcoholic Parents Anonymous, and Children of Rageaholic Parents Anonymous. Within the context of the show, Stuart is quick to point out that he is not a licensed therapist but relies instead upon the credibility of his own experiences as a non-professional. His guests are very often celebrities; however, Smalley is seemingly unaware of his guests' fame as he never uses their full names so as to "protect (their) anonymity." Other guests who appeared are his family members, such as Macaulay Culkin playing his nephew or Roseanne Barr playing his sister, who suffers from battered wife syndrome. A Canadian relative, Leon Smalley, played by Kiefer Sutherland has a show called "Today's Meditation", which is a big hit in Canada.

== Related works ==
The character was popular enough to spawn a 1992 book, I'm Good Enough, I'm Smart Enough, and Doggone It, People Like Me!: Daily Affirmations with Stuart Smalley. The book keeps in line with the concept of the character and is presented (tongue-in-cheek) as a legitimate day-to-day affirmation book. Each page is dated and the reader is "supposed" to follow through as if they were actually seeking help. Naturally, however, things go wrong in the writing process, and thus the affirmations branch off into Stuart's own commentary about what a hard time he is having writing it, etc. He also discusses his past relationship with ex-significant-other Dale, "the Rageaholic".

An audiobook was also released, You're Good Enough, You're Smart Enough, and Doggone It, People Like You. The content of this audio book was completely different from the printed one but followed through on the same gag. The tapes played guided visualizations meant to help the listener relax and focus; however, Stuart makes a vow at the beginning not to make any edits or corrections in the recording process because "I'm a perfectionist and if I start making changes, I'll never stop." As such it is full of humorous errors, including one gag in which Stuart tells his listeners who are driving to work to "close their eyes and envision..." something. (As such, there is a warning label on the box that says, "Do not listen while driving," a joke that doesn't make sense until one has actually listened to the tape.)

As the character's popularity increased, the film Stuart Saves His Family was released. It chronicled the life Stuart leads and his relationship with a very dysfunctional family. His alcoholic father and enabling mother, overweight sister and equally alcoholic brother call upon him when an aunt dies. He is asked to oversee the sale of her home, bringing much-needed money to all of the family. At the same time, his public access self-help show is canceled. Naturally, things go awry, and he must learn to deal with himself and his own life before he can attempt to help others. While many critics praised the film, including Gene Siskel (who awarded the film 3.5 stars out of four, in his print review) and Roger Ebert, the film was financially unsuccessful.

== Later appearances ==
The character effectively disappeared after the box-office failure of the film and Franken's exit from Saturday Night Live, save one appearance where Smalley, bitter over the failure of the movie, refused to finish his affirmation, excoriated his viewers for not watching, and openly wept. At one point in that skit, Smalley (in reference to the film, its glowing reviews, and the film that beat it at the box office) commented: "But you didn't want 'funny' and 'poignant'. You wanted 'Dumb....and Dumber....and Dumber....and Dumber'!" In 2004, Franken reprised the Smalley character when Al Gore hosted, mentioning that his father was still an alcoholic.

The character also showed up from time to time on The Al Franken Show. Later, after Franken made a bid for a United States Senate seat that ended in success but also in controversy – he would not be officially declared the winner, and therefore under Minnesota law could not be seated, until a full eight months after the election itself – he would be dubbed "Senator Stuart Smalley" by critics and fans alike.

== Catchphrases ==
The character is known for a number of catchphrases, many of which are chosen not just for comic effect, but to play on a perceived tendency of the self-help movement to talk and think in psychobabble. Some, such as the phrase "stinkin' thinkin'", are taken from common 12-step slogans.

- "I'm good enough, I'm smart enough, and doggone it, people like me."
- "That's just stinkin' thinkin!"
- "You're should-ing all over yourself."
- "Denial ain't just a river in Egypt!"
- "I am a worthy human being."
- "...and that's...okay."
- "Trace it, face it, and erase it."
- "I don't know what I'm doing. They're gonna cancel the show. I'm gonna die homeless and penniless and twenty pounds overweight and no one will ever love me."
- "I'm in a shame spiral."
- "You're only as sick as your secrets."
- "Compare and despair."
- "You need a checkup from the neckup."
- "I am a human being, not a human doing."
- "Pee-wee Herman: There but for the grace of God go I."
- "It’s easier to put on slippers than to carpet the whole world."
- "Labels disable."

== See also ==
- Recurring Saturday Night Live characters and sketches
