= Lost Cause (Beck song) =

Single by Beck

from the album Sea Change
- Released: 2002
- Genre: Folk rock
- Length: 3:47
- Label: Geffen
- Songwriter(s): Beck Hansen
- Producer(s): Nigel Godrich

Beck singles chronology
"Nicotine & Gravy" (2000)	"Lost Cause" (2002)	"Guess I'm Doing Fine" (2002)

Sea Change track listing
- 1. "The Golden Age"; 2. "Paper Tiger"; 3. "Guess I'm Doing Fine"; 4. "Lonesome Tears"; 5. "Lost Cause"; 6. "End of the Day"; 7. "It's All in Your Mind"; 8. "Round the Bend"; 9. "Already Dead"; 10. "Sunday Sun"; 11. "Little One"; 12. "Side of the Road"

"Lost Cause" is the fifth song from Beck's fifth major-label studio album, Sea Change. It was also released as a promo single only, in the UK, Germany, and Japan.

It reached number 36 on the Billboard Alternative Airplay chart on March 22, 2003.

MTV.com described "Lost Cause" as "sparse and melancholy, driven by a folksy guitar passage and soft, sedated vocals and embellished with soft brush drumming."

== Music video ==
Two music videos were made for "Lost Cause", both directed by Garth Jennings. The original video features an effigy of Beck falling from the sky. It was produced entirely in Adobe Photoshop. The second version features Beck and his band playing the song, with various moments being sped up, slowed down and filmed in stop motion.
