= Tom Rothrock =

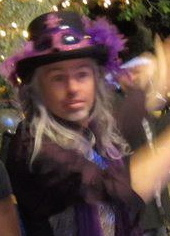
- Rothrock in 2012

Background information
- Genres: Rock, EDM
- Occupations: Musician, composer, record producer
- Instruments: Guitar, electric guitar, piano
- Years active: 1987–present
- Labels: Bong Load Records, Various

Tom Rothrock is an international musician, composer, record producer, and owner of Bong Load Records. Tom Rothrock has worked with James Blunt, Foo Fighters, Moby, Beck, Badly Drawn Boy, R. L. Burnside, Athlete, Sloan, Gwen Stefani, Motörhead, Elbow, Stevie Nicks, Poison, Elliott Smith, Richard Thompson, and Yonder Mountain String Band. Rothrock has also composed or contributed to soundtracks for notable motion pictures such as About A Boy, Good Will Hunting, Collateral, and The SpongeBob SquarePants Movie.

Rothrock started Bong Load Custom Records in the early 1990s enlisting former Record Plant Recording Studios co-workers, Bradshaw Lambert and Rob Schnapf. Bong Load Records is notable for developing and releasing Beck's "Loser" single which became the first number one, non-major label single since FM radio became mainstream. Together Rothrock, Schnapf, Beck, and Karl Stephenson recorded Mellow Gold, Beck's major label debut.

In film, Rothrock produced the original songs for the About A Boy soundtrack and score with Badly Drawn Boy. He composed music for the film Collateral directed by Michael Mann and is credited on the song "Goofy Goober Rock" on The SpongeBob SquarePants Movie soundtrack. His recording of R. L. Burnside's "It's Bad You Know" was included on The Sopranos original television soundtrack release.

During 2013, Rothrock returned to collaborate with James Blunt on the album Moon Landing. Working primarily at Sunset Sound Studios in Hollywood, California the resulting release was generally well received among music critics and considered a comeback for Blunt.

In 2016, Rothrock marked Bong Load Records' 25th anniversary by re-launching the label's vinyl record division. He also relocated the Los Angeles company to the arts district of Las Vegas, Nevada.

== Selected discography ==
=== Solo ===
- 2014: Brightest Starr Single – Tom Rothrock Featuring Marie´ Digby
- 2010: All Right Now Ep – Tom Rothrock
- 2010: FuzzFace Ep – Tom Rothrock
- 2010: Magneto Ep – Tom Rothrock
- 2010: Eivissa Ep – Tom Rothrock
- 2007: Resonator Lp – Tom Rothrock

=== Produced and/or mixed ===
- 2013: Moon Landing – James Blunt
- 2013: Division Street – Harper Simon
- 2011: Blue Sky Blue – Pete Murray
- 2009: Harper Simon – Harper Simon
- 2009: Black Swan – Athlete
- 2009: The Show – Yonder Mountain String Band
- 2008: Unfold – Marie Digby
- 2007: All the Lost Souls – James Blunt
- 2007: New Moon – Elliott Smith
- 2007: Never Slow Down – Roman Carter
- 2006: Yonder Mountain String Band – Yonder Mountain String Band
- 2005: Leaders Of The Free World – Elbow
- 2005: Surgery – The Warlocks
- 2005: Exploration – Sarah Lee Guthrie & Johnny Irion
- 2005: Back to Bedlam – James Blunt
- 2004: Launchpad – Particle
- 2004: Greatest Hits: 30 Years Of Rock Who Do you Love Remix – George Thorogood
- 2003: Action Pact – Sloan
- 2003: Third Shift Grotto Slack – Jay Farrar
- 2002: Have You Fed the Fish? – Badly Drawn Boy
- 2002: About A Boy – Badly Drawn Boy
- 2001: Hell Below/Stars Above – Toadies
- 2001: Slow – Phil Tagliere
- 2000: Supreme Beings Of Leisure – Supreme Beings Of Leisure
- 2000: Figure 8 – Elliott Smith
- 1999: Mock Tudor – Richard Thompson
- 1998: XO – Elliott Smith
- 1998: Aquamosh – Plastilina Mosh
- 1998: Come On In – R. L. Burnside
- 1997: Either/Or – Elliott Smith
- 1997: Soundtrack – Good Will Hunting
- 1997: Mr. Wizard – R. L. Burnside
- 1996: Mic City Sons – Heatmiser
- 1996: Static Prevails – Jimmy Eat World
- 1996: Odelay – Beck
- 1995: Foo Fighters (album) – Foo Fighters
- 1995: Daredevil – Fu Manchu
- 1994: Rubberneck – Toadies
- 1994: Mellow Gold – Beck
- 1994: Box Set – Wool
- 1993: Fishy Pants – Muzza Chunka
- 1993: Test Your Own Eyes – Dog Society
- 1992: Budspawn – Wool
- 1991: Swallow This Live – Poison
- 1991: Timespace – The Best of Stevie Nicks – Stevie Nicks

=== Selected film composition, film music production and placement ===
- 2012: Holy Motors
- 2004: Collateral
- 2004: The SpongeBob SquarePants Movie
- 2004: Shrek 2
- 2002: About A Boy
- 1999: The Sopranos
- 1997: Good Will Hunting
