= Rise and Fall (The Warlocks album) =

Studio album by the Warlocks
- Released: 2001
- Studios: Catasonic Studios, Los Angeles, CA
- Genres: Psychedelic rock; neo-psychedelia
- Length: 58:22
- Label: Bomp!
- Producer: Rod Cervera

The Warlocks chronology
The Warlocks (2000)	Rise and Fall (2001)	Phoenix (2002)

Professional ratings
Review scores
Source	Rating
AllMusic	4.5/5 stars
Stylus Magazine	B

Rise and Fall is the first album by American neo-psychedelic rock band the Warlocks. It was released by Bomp! Records in 2001.

== Content ==
The album has been compared to early Pink Floyd and also to the work of the Velvet Underground and more recent space rock acts, such as Spacemen 3.

The UK version of the album features a different track selection and ordering, modified to include tracks from the Warlocks' previous self-titled EP. The album's experimental structure, opening on the US version with a fourteen-minute instrumental and featuring a number of rough jams, would surprise and divide critics, both being remarked on as a highlight, while also being panned as not translating well from live performance to the studio.

== Track listing ==
1. "Jam of the Witches"
2. "House of Glass"
3. "Skull Death Drum Jam"
4. "Whips of Mercy"
5. "Song for Nico"
6. "Left and Right of the Moon"
7. "Motorcycles"
8. "Heavy Bomber"
9. "Laser Beam"

UK version

1. "Song for Nico"
2. "Cocaine Blues"
3. "Caveman Rock"
4. "Skull Death Drum Jam"
5. "Jam of the Witches"
6. "House of Glass"
7. "Whips of Mercy"
8. "Motorcycles"
9. "Jam of the Zombies"
