= Loser (Beck song) =

1993 single by Beck

Single by Beck

from the album Mellow Gold
- Released: March 8, 1993
- Genre: Alternative rock; hip-hop
- Length: 3:55
- Label: Bong Load; DGC
- Songwriters: Beck; Carl Stephenson
- Producers: Beck; Carl Stephenson; Tom Rothrock

Beck singles chronology
"MTV Makes Me Want to Smoke Crack" (1993)	"Loser" (1993)	"Pay No Mind (Snoozer)" (1994)

Music video
- "Loser" on YouTube

"Loser" is a single by American musician Beck. It was written by Beck and record producer Carl Stephenson, who both produced the song with Tom Rothrock. "Loser" was initially released as Beck's second single by independent record label Bong Load Custom Records on 12-inch vinyl format with catalog number BL5 on March 8, 1993.

When it was first released independently, "Loser" began receiving airplay on various modern rock stations, and the song's popularity eventually led to a major-label record deal with Geffen Records-subsidiary DGC Records. After the song's re-release under DGC, the song peaked at number 10 on the US Billboard Hot 100 in April 1994, becoming Beck's first single to hit a major chart. Internationally, the song reached number one in Norway and entered the top 10 in Australia, Austria, Canada, Iceland, New Zealand, and Sweden.

"Loser" was subsequently released on Beck's third studio album Mellow Gold, in 1994. The song's music video was directed by Steve Hanft and filmed in California on a budget of total $14,300. It received a nomination at the 1994 Billboard Music Video Awards. In 2023, Billboard magazine ranked "Loser" among the 500 best pop songs of all time.

== Conception and recording ==
In the late 1980s and early 1990s, Beck was a homeless musician in the New York City anti-folk scene. He returned to his hometown of Los Angeles in early 1991, due to his financial struggles. Described by biographer Julian Palacios as having "no opportunities whatsoever", Beck worked low-wage jobs to survive, but still found time to perform his songs at local coffeehouses and clubs. In order to keep indifferent audiences engaged in his music, Beck would play in a spontaneous, joking manner. "I'd be banging away on a Son House tune and the whole audience would be talking, so maybe out of desperation or boredom, or the audience's boredom, I'd make up these ridiculous songs just to see if people were listening. 'Loser' was an extension of that." Tom Rothrock, co-owner of independent record label Bong Load, expressed interest in Beck's music and introduced him to Carl Stephenson, a record producer for Rap-A-Lot Records.

"Loser" was written and recorded by Beck while he was visiting Stephenson's home. Although the song was created spontaneously, Beck has claimed to have had the idea for the song since the late 1980s; he once said, "I don't think I would have been able to go in and do 'Loser' in a six-hour shot without having been somewhat prepared. It was accidental, but it was something that I'd been working toward for a long time." Beck played some of his songs for Stephenson; Stephenson enjoyed the songs, but was unimpressed by Beck's rapping. Stephenson recorded a brief guitar part from one of Beck's songs onto an 8-track, looped it, and added a drum track to it. Stephenson then added his own sitar playing and other samples. At that point, Beck began writing and improvising lyrics for the recording. For the song's vocals, Beck attempted to emulate the rapping style of Public Enemy's Chuck D. According to Beck, the line that became the song's chorus originated because "When [Stephenson] played it back, I thought, 'Man, I'm the worst rapper in the world, I'm just a loser.' So I started singing 'I'm a loser baby, so why don't you kill me.'" According to Rothrock, the song was largely finished in six and a half hours, with two minor overdubs several months later.

== Composition and lyrics ==
"Loser"
A 23-second sample of "Loser" from Beck's 1994 album Mellow Gold, from the middle of the song's first verse to the chorus

Beck acknowledged the impact of folk on the song, saying "I'd realized that a lot of what folk music is about taking a tradition and reflecting your own time. I knew my folk music would take off, if I put hip-hop beats behind it." He had also perceived similarities between Delta blues and hip hop, which helped to inspire the song. The A.V. Club's Annie Zaleski opines that the song imitates abstract hip hop, while James Reed from The Boston Globe called it an alternative rock anthem, and Veronica Chambers for Vibe magazine described the song as a "folk-based hip hop song." "Loser" revolves around several recurring musical elements: a slide guitar riff, Stephenson's sitar, the bassline, and a tremolo guitar part. The song's drum track is sampled from a Johnny Jenkins cover of Dr. John's "I Walk on Guilded Splinters" from the 1970 album Ton-Ton Macoute!. During the song's break, there is a sample of a line of dialogue from the 1991 Steve Hanft-directed film Kill the Moonlight, which goes "I'm a driver/I'm a winner/Things are gonna change, I can feel it". Hanft and Beck were friends, and Hanft would go on to direct several music videos for Beck, including the video for "Loser". The song is in the key of D major with a tempo of 86 beats per minute.

Referred to as a "stoner rap" by AllMusic's Stephen Thomas Erlewine, the lyrics are mostly nonsensical. The song's chorus, in which Beck sings the lines "Soy un perdedor/I'm a loser baby, so why don't you kill me?", is often interpreted as a parody of Generation X's "slacker" culture. Beck has denied the validity of this meaning, instead saying that the chorus is simply about his lack of skill as a rapper. Jon Pareles wrote in The New York Times that "The sentiment of 'Loser' [...] reflects the twentysomething trademark, a mixture of self-mockery and sardonic defiance", noting Beck's "offhand vocal tone and free-associative lyrics" and comparing his vocals to "Bob Dylan talk-singing". After its recording, Beck thought that the song was interesting but unimpressive. He later said, "The raps and vocals are all first takes. If I'd known the impact it was going to make, I would have put something a little more substantial in it." The relationship between Beck and Stephenson soured after the release of "Loser" as a single. Stephenson regretted his involvement in creating the song, in particular the "negative" lyrics, saying "I feel bad about it. It's not Beck the person, it's the words. I just wish I could have been more of a positive influence."

== Release and performance ==
"Loser" was first released on March 8, 1993, as a 12-inch vinyl single on Bong Load, with only 500 copies pressed. Beck felt that "Loser" was mediocre, and only agreed to its release at Rothrock's insistence. "Loser" unexpectedly received radio airplay, starting in Los Angeles, where college radio stations KCRW and KXLU were the first to play it, followed by modern rock station KROQ-FM. Beck made his worldwide live radio performance debut on July 23, 1993 during KCRW's Morning Becomes Eclectic, hosted by Chris Douridas. The song then spread to Seattle through KNDD, and KROQ-FM began playing the song on an almost hourly basis. By the time stations in New York were requesting copies of "Loser", Bong Load had already run out. Beck was soon beset with offers to sign with major labels. Convinced that the song was a potential hit, Rothrock gave a vinyl pressing of the single to his friend Tony Berg, who had been working in the A&R department for Geffen Records. Berg said, "I just lost my mind when I heard it. He left my office, and I swear, by the time he got home, I had left a message asking him to introduce me to [Beck]". Beck, in spite of his hesitance to be on any major label, signed with Geffen subsidiary DGC. He explained, "I wasn't going to do anything for a long time, but Bong Load didn't have the means to make as many copies as people wanted. Geffen were involved and they wanted to make it to more of an organized place, one with a bigger budget and better distribution."

In January 1994, DGC reissued "Loser" on CD and cassette, and Geffen began heavily promoting the single. Bong Load, having retained the rights to release Beck's songs on vinyl due to the nature of Beck's contract with DGC, re-pressed the 12-inch single in larger quantities than before. "Loser" quickly ascended the charts in the US, reaching a peak of number 10 on the Billboard Hot 100 singles chart and topping the Modern Rock Tracks chart. It was certified gold by the Recording Industry Association of America (RIAA) and sold 600,000 copies domestically. The song also charted in the UK, Australia, New Zealand, and throughout Europe. "Loser"'s worldwide success shot Beck into a position of attention, and the media dubbed him the center of the new so-called "slacker" movement. Beck refuted this characterization of himself, saying, "Slacker my ass. I never had any slack. I was working a $4-an-hour job trying to stay alive. That slacker stuff is for people who have the time to be depressed about everything."

Around the time of the song's release, Beck had been approached about including "Loser" on the soundtrack of the comedy film Dumb and Dumber, but he refused. He recalled the process, "I remember getting a phone call one day. My manager said, 'There's a film. They want to use 'Loser' as the theme song.' There was a long pause, and he said, 'The name of the film is Dumb And Dumber.' And I just remember: That sums up what the world thinks of me at this point. I tried to have fun with it, tried to not take it too serious. But at the same time, it was a little disheartening sometimes."

== Critical reception ==
In his Consumer Guide, Robert Christgau gave the single CD a one-star honorable mention, picked out two songs, "Fume" and "Alcohol", and stated that it's Beck's "greatest hit, an album demo, and two-for-three prime odds and ends". David Stubbs from Melody Maker remarked "the downer-than-downbeat lo-fi, lo-esteem" of "Loser". Pan-European magazine Music & Media wrote, "Despite its title, the odd combination of sitar and dobro-driven(!) alternative pop with dance rhythms, makes a winner out of this song." Paul Moody from NME wrote, "A greased-up sliding blues it may be, but deep inside it there's a smog-filled LA desperation at work (The re-run shows and the cocaine nose jobs/The folk singer slob who hung himself with a guitar string) where Beck actually, erm, makes some sense. Is this allowed?" Michael Azerrad from Rolling Stone commented, "Enter 23-year-old Beck singing, I'm a loser, baby, so why don't you kill me? on 'Loser', the ultracatchy opening track on this fascinating debut. Just to underline the point, a sampled George Bush says, I'm a driver. I'm a winner."

Another Rolling Stone editor, Paul Evans, felt it "was an awesome, omnipresent single, its trickle-of-consciousness lyrics, ragged acoustic six-string and noise percussion lingering on the radio waves like air freshener." Miranda Sawyer from Select named it Single of the Month, writing, "'Loser' is the winner (ha) because it's unlike anything else. Strangled, ragged, fuzzed-out vocals squeeze alongside the swagger of a John Lee Hooker geetar and a hiccupy hip hop beat. You've never heard anything like it. It's a pop song, too." Charles Aaron from Spin ranked the song number one in his list of the "Top 20 Singles of the Year", adding that it "was novelty-pop as generational statement like nothing else since '(You Gotta) Fight for Your Right to Party!'" Another Spin editor, Jay Stowe, wrote, "An irresistible hook-line like I'm a loser, baby, so why don't you kill me...? comes around maybe once a decade. So, hey, jump in the craze train. America's browbeaten youth never had a more absurd—or honest—anthem."

== Impact and legacy ==
"Loser" ranked first place in the 1994 Village Voice Pazz & Jop critics' poll. In 2004, this song was ranked number 200 in Rolling Stone's list of the 500 Greatest Songs of All Time. In September 2010, Pitchfork Media included the song at number nine on their "Top 200 Tracks of the 90s". In 2007, VH1 ranked it number 22 on their list of the "100 Greatest Songs of the 90's". In 2012, Paste ranked it number one on their list of the "20 Greatest Beck Songs", and in 2020, The Guardian ranked the song number three on their list of the "30 Greatest Beck Songs". In October 2023, Billboard magazine ranked "Loser" number 235 in their "500 Best Pop Songs of All Time".

== Music video ==
The accompanying music video for "Loser" was directed by Beck's friend Steve Hanft. Hanft had worked for a week on storyboards for the video, then called a meeting with Beck's label, Bong Load Records, and requested a $300 shooting budget. The unprocessed 16 mm film footage was frozen for 6 months until Beck signed with Geffen Records. Geffen gave Hanft $14,000 to process, edit, and master the video, making the budget total $14,300. Filming for the video was done all across California, including in Rothrock's Humboldt County studio and backyard along the Mad River in Arcata, and at the Santa Monica graveyard. The video is a mashup of various 16 mm film clips. Beck insisted they were "fucking around" when they made the video; he told Option in 1994, "We weren't making anything slick – it was deliberately crude. You know?"

The video received its world premiere on MTV's late-night alternative rock program 120 Minutes on January 30, 1994. It was nominated for Best New Artist Clip of the Year in the category for Alternative/Modern Rock at the 1994 Billboard Music Video Awards. "Loser" also ranked sixth in the music video category in the 1994 Village Voice Pazz & Jop poll.

Hanft, inspired by the Black Sabbath's 16 mm film promo "Sabbath Bloody Sabbath" and also surrealist filmmakers Luis Buñuel and Maya Deren, included stop-motion animation footage of a moving coffin in the video. Two coffins were used, one which was a prop borrowed from a local drama school and the other which had been built by Beck and Hanft. Clips and sounds sampled from Hanft's 1991 Cal Arts, MFA thesis film, "Kill the Moonlight", about a loser stock car racer, are also included in the video and song. The moment where Beck is wearing a storm trooper mask is often censored for copyright reasons. The work's only clip shot on video rather than film is the one depicting famous mountain dancer Jesco White wearing a white satin shirt and dancing on a picnic table. The clip was shot by director Julian Nitzberg and was added to the final cut on the last day of editing.

The music video for Beck's 2014 song "Heart Is a Drum" features characters from the "Loser" video, including the grim reaper, and another version of Beck in which he wears the white outfit from the "Loser" video. Also, two spacemen enter near the end of the "Heart Is a Drum" video as they ride away on the back of a pick up truck just as they do in the "Kill the Moonlight" film clip that was included in the "Loser" video.

== Unproduced "Weird Al" Yankovic parody ==
Around the time the song was released, "Weird Al" Yankovic had approached Beck asking for permission to record a parody called "Schmoozer". At the time, Beck was just entering the music industry, and did not want his reputation to be seen as a one-hit wonder and refused the parody. Beck stated in 2022 that he wished he had given Yankovic permission, saying "I think it would have been an amazing video, I'm actually really sad it didn't happen." Despite the refusal, Yankovic was able to include a portion of the song in his polka medley called "The Alternative Polka".

== Formats and track listing ==
All songs were written by Beck except where noted.

- Bong Load 12-inch (BL5)
1. "Loser" (Beck, Karl Stephenson) – 3:58
2. "Steal My Body Home" – 5:18
- US CD (DGCDM-21930)
1. "Loser" (Beck, Karl Stephenson) – 3:58
2. "Corvette Bummer" – 4:57
3. "Alcohol" – 3:51
4. "Soul Suckin Jerk (Reject)" – 6:10
5. "Fume" – 4:29
- US 7-inch and cassette (DGCS 7-19270; DGCS-12270)
1. "Loser" (Beck, Karl Stephenson) – 3:58
2. "Alcohol" – 3:51
- UK 7-inch and cassette (GFS 67; GFSC 67)
1. "Loser" (Beck, Karl Stephenson) – 3:58
2. "Alcohol" – 3:51
3. "Fume" – 4:29
- UK and Swedish CD (GFSTD 67; GED 21891)
1. "Loser" (Beck, Karl Stephenson) – 3:58
2. "Totally Confused" – 3:28
3. "Corvette Bummer" – 4:56
4. "MTV Makes Me Want to Smoke Crack" (Lounge Version) – 3:29

== Charts ==
=== Weekly charts ===
Chart (1994)	Peak position
Australia (ARIA)	8
Austria (Ö3 Austria Top 40)	10
Belgium (Ultratop 50 Flanders)	18
Canada Top Singles (RPM)	7
Europe (Eurochart Hot 100)	22
Finland (Suomen virallinen lista)	16
France (SNEP)	20
Germany (GfK)	18
Iceland (Íslenski Listinn Topp 40)	2
Ireland (IRMA)	28
Israel (Israeli Singles Chart)	29
Netherlands (Dutch Top 40)	21
Netherlands (Single Top 100)	21
New Zealand (Recorded Music NZ)	5
Norway (VG-lista)	1
Scottish Singles Sales (Official Charts)	16
Sweden (Sverigetopplistan)	6
Switzerland (Schweizer Hitparade)	19
UK Singles (Official Charts)	15
UK Airplay (Music Week)	30
US Billboard Hot 100	10
US Alternative Airplay (Billboard)	1
US Dance Singles Sales (Billboard)	14
US Mainstream Rock Airplay (Billboard)	39
US Pop Airplay (Billboard)	17
US Cash Box Top 100	14

=== Year-end charts ===
Chart (1994)	Position
Australia (ARIA)	70
Brazil (Mais Tocadas)	71
Canada Top Singles (RPM)	62
Europe (Eurochart Hot 100)	72
Germany (Media Control)	68
Iceland (Íslenski Listinn Topp 40)	11
Netherlands (Dutch Top 40)	186
New Zealand (RIANZ)	29
Sweden (Topplistan)	31
UK Singles (OCC)	155
US Billboard Hot 100	50
US Modern Rock Tracks (Billboard)	8

== Certifications ==
Region	Certification	Certified units/sales
Australia (ARIA)	3× Platinum	210,000^{‡}
New Zealand (RMNZ)	2× Platinum	60,000^{‡}
United Kingdom (BPI)	Gold	400,000^{‡}
United States (RIAA)	Gold	600,000
^{^} Shipments figures based on certification alone.^{‡} Sales+streaming figures based on certification alone.

== Release history ==
Region	Date	Format(s)	Label(s)	Ref(s).
United States	March 8, 1993	12-inch vinyl	Bong Load	
Germany	February 21, 1994	CD	Geffen; Bong Load	
United Kingdom	February 21, 1994	7-inch vinyl; CD; cassette	Geffen; Bong Load	
Australia	March 6, 1994	CD	Geffen; Bong Load	
Japan	April 6, 1994	CD	Geffen	
