= Forest for the Trees (band) =

American rock band

- Origin: Los Angeles, California, U.S.
- Genres: Trip hop, neo-psychedelia
- Years active: 1993–2002
- Label: DreamWorks
- Members: Carl Stephenson

Forest for the Trees was an American music group from Los Angeles, California, started by Carl Stephenson and consisting of Mark Petersen, John "coz" Acosta, Papa Bear Martinez and other collaborators.

== History ==
Carl Stephenson was born in Washington, D.C. in 1967. He lived in Laurel, Maryland, as well as Olympia, Washington and Houston, Texas. In 1990, he moved to Los Angeles, California, where he met Beck. Stephenson co-wrote and co-produced Beck's 1993 song "Loser" (credited as Karl Stephenson).

The band's debut studio album, Forest for the Trees, was released on DreamWorks Records in 1997. It peaked at number 190 on the Billboard 200 chart and number 16 on the Heatseekers Albums chart. Houston Press called it "one of the most impressive major-label debuts of 1997". "Dream" was released as a single from the album. It peaked at number 72 on the Billboard Hot 100 chart and number 18 on the Modern Rock Tracks chart.

The band performed at the 2002 Coachella Valley Music and Arts Festival.

== Discography ==
=== Studio albums ===
- Forest for the Trees (1997)

=== EPs ===
- The Sound of Wet Paint (1999)

=== Singles ===
- "Dream" (1997)
- “Planet Unknown” (1997)
