= Primavera Sound 2022 =

Edition of music festival in Spain

- Genre: Pop, alternative rock, indie, electronic, dance, hip hop, reggaeton
- Dates: June 2–12, 2022
- Locations: Barcelona and Sant Adrià del Besòs (Catalonia, Spain)
- Coordinates: 41°24′40.75″N 2°13′28.57″E
- Founders: Pablo Soler
- Attendance: 460,500 (estimate)
- Website: primaverasound.com

The Primavera Sound 2022 music festival was held from 2 June to 12 June 2022 at the Parc del Fòrum in Barcelona and Sant Adrià del Besòs, Spain. After both the 2020 and 2021 editions were cancelled due to the COVID-19 pandemic, the festival returned with a new two-weekend format that combined many bookings from the scheduled 2020 and 2021 lineups while adding new artists as well.

The first weekend was headlined by Pavement, Tame Impala, Beck, The National, Gorillaz, Jorja Smith, Nick Cave & the Bad Seeds and Tyler, the Creator, while the second weekend was headlined by Dua Lipa, Gorillaz, Interpol, Tyler, the Creator, Lorde, The Strokes, Jorja Smith, Megan Thee Stallion, Tame Impala, Phoenix and Yeah Yeah Yeahs. Massive Attack were scheduled to headline both weekends, but had to cancel all performances scheduled for 2022 due to a member's "serious illness." In between both weekends at Parc del Fòrum, Primavera a la Ciutat was held in a record 14 local venues across the city of Barcelona from 5 June to 8 June.

The festival was attended by a franchise-record 460,500 people and was the fourth-most attended festival in the world for 2022 behind Coachella, Tomorrowland and the New Orleans Jazz & Heritage Festival. It generated €349 million in revenue for the city of Barcelona, with each attendee spending an average of €1,423. It was the festival's twentieth edition and named an Event of Exceptional Public Interest by the Spanish government's Ministry of Culture and Sports. A total of 674 artists performed over the 16 stages at the Parc del Fòrum and the 14 additional venues throughout Barcelona.

== Background ==
On the final day of Primavera Sound 2019, the festival announced that Pavement would be reuniting for the first time since 2010 to headline Primavera Sound 2020.

The initial 2020 lineup was announced on 15 January, with Massive Attack, Pavement, The National, The Strokes, Lana del Rey, Tyler, the Creator, Bad Bunny and Disclosure as headliners. However, on 28 March 2020, the festival announced that it would be moved to 26–30 August as a result of the growing COVID-19 pandemic. On 11 May 2020, it was announced that the year's edition would be cancelled entirely.

On 27 May 2020, Primavera Sound revealed its 2021 lineup, scheduled for 2–6 June. The lineup was similar to the cancelled 2020 edition, but with Beck, Gorillaz and Tame Impala added as headliners without Massive Attack or Lana del Rey, and Charli XCX, FKA Twigs and Jamie xx added to the undercard. On 9 June, Primavera Sound finalized the lineup with several new acts such as Beach Bunny, Kurt Vile, Kim Gordon, Slowthai, Khruangbin, Lingua Ignota, Rolling Blackouts Coastal Fever, Otoboke Beaver, The Murder Capital and The Caretaker.

On 2 March 2021, the festival was cancelled for a second straight year as preparations under current COVID-19 restrictions were deemed untenable. On 25 May, Primavera Sound announced its initial lineup for 2022, scheduled for 2–12 June. It would be the first time that the festival would take place over two weeks. Dua Lipa, Jorja Smith, Nick Cave & the Bad Seeds, Interpol, Lorde, Megan Thee Stallion and Yeah Yeah Yeahs were the artists named headliners that did not appear in the 2020 or 2021 lineups. On 8 June, Phoenix was added as an additional headliner, and the next day, Ride was announced, performing Nowhere and Going Blank Again in full on back-to-back days.

On 13 December, the festival confirmed even more additions to the lineup, including Low, Grimes, PinkPantheress, Bleachers, Amyl and the Sniffers, Remi Wolf, Magdalena Bay, Wet Leg and Meet Me at the Altar. Napalm Death, Beabadoobee and Kano dropped out. On 1 February 2022, The Smile was added to the lineup.

Thirty-eight days before the start of the festival, on 28 April, the festival announced more lineup changes. Mdou Moctar, Napalm Death, Caterina Barbieri, Richard Dawson and Circle, Yeule, Doss and IC3PEAK were among the names added to replace Connan Mockasin, Jessica Pratt, King Princess, OM, Perfume, Tokischa and Turnstile dropping out.

On 31 May, a day before the festival's activities would start, Bikini Kill, Georgia, Girl in Red, Kehlani, Lingua Ignota and Pa Salieu dropped out, replaced by Joey Badass, Let's Eat Grandma and Marina Herlop.

Leading up to the festival, there were initial organisational difficulties and notable tensions between the City Council of Barcelona, the City Council of Sant Adrià del Besòs and co-director Gabi Ruiz about a possible relocation to Madrid. Despite initial controversies, resolutions came forward by increasing staff members and flowing communication with Mayor Ada Colau, who agreed to expand the festival's contract with the city until at least 2027.

== Festival recap ==
Primavera Sound hosted a free opening day event at the Poble Espanyol on 1 June, featuring Rina Sawayama headlining as well as The Linda Lindas, Wet Leg and Teto Preto.

On 2 June, The Strokes announced that they would be unable to perform their scheduled first week headlining slot the next day because of a COVID-19 infection within the band. As a result, Caribou was moved to The Strokes' timeslot on the main stages, while Mogwai added a second set to accompany their second week performance. Tame Impala covered "Last Nite" during their first week headline set in honor of The Strokes' cancellation, and Kevin Parker said onstage about playing it: "Probably never again. It's just for you guys."

Pavement's headlining set on 2 June was just their second performance since 2010, aside from a warmup show at Los Angeles' The Fonda Theatre a week earlier. The band played 27 songs, including many that had not been played since the 1990s.

Gorillaz brought several guests during their headlining sets on 4 and 9 June: Mos Def for "Stylo" and "Sweepstakes", Fatoumata Diawara for "Broken" and "Désolé", Bootie Brown for "Dirty Harry", Slowthai for "Momentary Bliss" and De La Soul for "Feel Good Inc." Stereogum lauded their performance as "the big unifying act" to close the first weekend.

Nick Cave and the Bad Seeds headlined on 4 June in what was just their second show since the death of Nick Cave's son Jethro. He dedicated the song "I Need You" to his two sons Luke and Earl, whom he said were probably watching Bauhaus' simultaneous performance. He also dedicated "Jubilee Street" "to the children".

King Gizzard & the Lizard Wizard notably performed five sets without repeating a single song in a setlist.

Sky Ferreira's set on 11 June was suddenly moved back two hours at the last minutes. She showed up onstage 15 minutes late, scrapped several songs midway, skipped parts of the setlist and successfully pleaded to be allotted more time to perform set closer "Everything Is Embarrassing". Playboi Carti also performed 40 minutes late on 9 June.

The Boiler Room x Cupra stage suffered a broken floor during a Kenny Beats DJ set. It, along with the NTS stage, had strict limited entry.

For the first time, the two main stages were placed side by side instead of facing each other. Director Gabi Ruiz said that this change was made to "reduce crowd pressure". The Independent commented that while it created an overall larger crowd in the area and longer bar queues, it benefited festivalgoers by allowing for an easier path between headlining sets. Many stages changed sponsorship names since the 2019 edition: the Ray-Ban amphitheatre stage was now named for Cupra, the Adidas seafront stage became Ouigo, the Pitchfork stage became Plenitude, the Primavera stage was now named Binance, and the SEAT main stage was now Estrella Damm.

Around 460,500 people attended the festival in seven days, 65% of whom were foreign, and a large proportion of these were from the United Kingdom. The festival had a significant economic impact, with each spectator spending an estimated average of 1,423 euros. Several Barcelonian independent record stores and NGOs also had representation at the festival.

=== Logistical concerns ===
The Independent, Stereogum, Clash and The Skinny reported on "dangerous conditions" at Parc del Fòrum during its first day on 2 June. The concerns included a lack of security, safe exit placements and crowd control which led to bottlenecking and crowd crushes, though the festival claimed that the grounds were still 30,000 people below maximum capacity. There was also a lack of water access, as there was none available aside from the bars which were reportedly understaffed, leading to hour-long waits. Festivalgoers complained about feeling unsafe and easily dehydrated in the Barcelona heat as a result. In response, Primavera Sound promised improvements and said the bar issues were caused by staff shortages and technical difficulties with credit card payments. The festival announced that it had fixed Parc del Fòrum's Wi-Fi issues overnight and hired additional staff for the remainder of the two weeks. Additionally, free cans of water would be distributed throughout three different stations on the grounds.

Stereogum noted that the festival's logistics felt better on the second day. Rolling Stone reported that "by its second weekend, the festival had (mostly) adjusted to these teething problems", as "the staff were more fairly distributed between the quieter and busier areas, the internet problems that caused delays with wireless card payments at the bars were fixed, and more water points had been added across the site." Mixmag said, "Comparisons to Fyre Festival were off-key, especially given that Primavera corrected most problems by the second night and all (apart from the bridge [to Bits]) by the following weekend."

== Headline set lists ==
=== First weekend ===
Beck
1. "Hyperlife / Movie Theme"
2. "Mixed Bizness"
3. "Devils Haircut"
4. "Dreams"
5. "Up All Night"
6. "Colors"
7. "Diamond Bollocks"
8. "The New Pollution"
9. "The Valley of the Pagans"
10. "Wizard"
11. "Wow"
12. "Hollywood Freaks"
13. "Hell Yes"
14. "Qué onda güero"
15. "Nicotine & Gravy"
16. "Girl"
17. "Hotwax"
18. "Dear Life"
19. "Morning"
20. "Stratosphere"
21. "Debra"
22. "Chemtrails"
23. "Jack-Ass"
24. "Lost Cause"
25. "Missing"
26. "Earthquake Weather"
27. "Night Running"
28. "Go It Alone"
29. "Everybody's Got to Learn Sometime"
30. "E-Pro"
31. "Loser"
32. "One Foot in the Grave"
33. "Where It's At"
Gorillaz
1. "M1 A1"
2. "Strange Timez"
3. "Last Living Souls"
4. "Tranz"
5. "19-2000"
6. "Tomorrow Comes Today"
7. "Cracker Island"
8. "O Green World"
9. "On Melancholy Hill"
10. "Rhinestone Eyes"
11. "Stylo" with Mos Def
12. "Sweepstakes" with Mos Def and Hypnotic Brass Ensemble
13. "Pirate Jet"
14. "Broken" with Hypnotic Brass Ensemble and Fatoumata Diawara
15. "El Mañana"
16. "Désolé" with Fatoumata Diawara
17. "Andromeda"
18. "Kids with Guns"
19. "Dirty Harry" with Bootie Brown
20. "Feel Good Inc." with De La Soul
21. "Momentary Bliss" with slowthai
22. "Clint Eastwood" with Sweetie Irie
Jorja Smith
1. "Teenage Fantasy"
2. "Be Honest"
3. "Addicted"
4. "Gone"
5. "February 3rd"
6. "Where Did I Go?"
7. "The One"
8. "On Your Own"
9. "Bussdown"
10. "Blue Lights"
11. "On My Mind"
The National
1. "Don't Swallow the Cap"
2. "Mistaken for Strangers"
3. "Bloodbuzz Ohio"
4. "Guilty Party"
5. "The System Only Dreams in Total Darkness"
6. "I Need My Girl"
7. "This Is the Last Time"
8. "Slow Show"
9. "Apartment Story"
10. "Light Years"
11. "Grease in Your Hair (Birdie)"
12. "Day I Die"
13. "Tropic Morning News (Haversham)"
14. "Pink Rabbits"
15. "England"
16. "Graceless"
17. "Fake Empire"
18. "Mr. November"
19. "Terrible Love"
20. "About Today"
Nick Cave & the Bad Seeds
1. "Get Ready for Love"
2. "There She Goes, My Beautiful World"
3. "From Her to Eternity"
4. "O Children"
5. "Jubilee Street"
6. "Bright Horses"
7. "I Need You"
8. "Waiting for You"
9. "Carnage"
10. "Tupelo"
11. "Red Right Hand"
12. "The Mercy Seat"
13. "The Ship Song"
14. "Higgs Boson Blues"
15. "City of Refuge"
16. "White Elephant"

Encore

17. "Into My Arms"
18. "Vortex"
19. "Ghosteen Speaks"
Pavement
1. "Frontwards"
2. "Silence Kid"
3. "Gold Soundz"
4. "Father to a Sister of Thought"
5. "Kennel District"
6. "Serpentine Pad"
7. "Spit on a Stranger"
8. "Black Out"
9. "Embassy Row"
10. "Transport Is Arranged"
11. "Perfume-V"
12. "The Hexx"
13. "Trigger Cut"
14. "Type Slowly"
15. "Cut Your Hair"
16. "Zurich Is Stained"
17. "Two States"
18. "Grounded"
19. "Harness Your Hopes"
20. "Stereo"
21. "Folk Jam"
22. "Shady Lane"
23. "Range Life"
24. "Unfair"
25. "Major Leagues"
26. "Summer Babe"
27. "Witchi Tai To"
Tame Impala
1. "One More Year"
2. "Borderline"
3. "Nangs"
4. "Breathe Deeper"
5. "Elephant"
6. "Lost in Yesterday"
7. "Apocalypse Dreams"
8. "Let It Happen"
9. "Feels Like We Only Go Backwards"
10. "Eventually"
11. "Runway, Houses, City, Clouds"

Encore

12. "Last Nite"
13. "The Less I Know the Better"
14. "New Person, Same Old Mistakes"
Tyler, the Creator
1. "CORSO"
2. "LEMONHEAD"
3. "WUSYANAME"
4. "LUMBERBACK"
5. "Come On, Let's Go"
6. "Boredom"
7. "See You Again"
8. "Who Dat Boy"
9. "Yonkers"
10. "Tamale"
11. "IFHY"
12. "I THINK"
13. "EARFQUAKE"
14. "NEW MAGIC WAND"
15. "I THOUGHT YOU WANTED TO DANCE"
16. "RUNITUP"

=== Second weekend ===
Dua Lipa
1. "Physical"
2. "New Rules"
3. "Love Again"
4. "Cool"
5. "Pretty Please"
6. "Break My Heart"
7. "Be the One"
8. "We're Good"
9. "Good in Bed"
10. "Fever" with Angèle
11. "Boys Will Be Boys"
12. "One Kiss"
13. "Electricity"
14. "Hallucinate"
15. "Cold Heart"
16. "Future Nostalgia"
17. "Levitating"
18. "Don't Start Now"
Gorillaz
1. "M1 A1"
2. "Strange Timez"
3. "Last Living Souls"
4. "Tranz"
5. "19-2000"
6. "Tomorrow Comes Today"
7. "Cracker Island"
8. "O Green World"
9. "On Melancholy Hill"
10. "Rhinestone Eyes"
11. "Stylo" with Mos Def
12. "Sweepstakes" with Mos Def and Hypnotic Brass Ensemble
13. "Pirate Jet"
14. "Broken" with Hypnotic Brass Ensemble
15. "With Love to an Ex" with Moonchild Sanelly and Hypnotic Brass Ensemble
16. "El Mañana"
17. "Kids with Guns"
18. "Andromeda"
19. "Dirty Harry" with Bootie Brown
20. "Feel Good Inc." with De La Soul
21. "Momentary Bliss"
22. "Clint Eastwood"
Interpol
1. "Untitled"
2. "Evil"
3. "Fables"
4. "C'mere"
5. "Pioneer to the Falls"
6. "Not Even Jail"
7. "Narc"
8. "Toni"
9. "Obstacle 1"
10. "All the Rage Back Home"
11. "Rest My Chemistry"
12. "Leif Erikson"
13. "The Rover"
14. "The New"
15. "PDA"
16. "Slow Hands"
Jorja Smith
1. "Teenage Fantasy"
2. "Be Honest"
3. "Addicted"
4. "Gone"
5. "February 3rd"
6. "Where Did I Go?"
7. "Wandering Romance"
8. "The One"
9. "On Your Own"
10. "Bussdown"
11. "Digging"
12. "Blue Lights"
13. "Happy Birthday"
14. "Come Over"
15. "On My Mind"
Lorde
1. "The Path"
2. "Homemade Dynamite"
3. "Buzzcut Season"
4. "Ribs"
5. "The Louvre"
6. "Secrets from a Girl (Who's Seen It All)"
7. "Mood Ring"
8. "Cruel Summer"
9. "Liability"
10. "Royals"
11. "Supercut"
12. "Perfect Places"
13. "Team"
14. "Green Light"
15. "Solar Power"
Megan Thee Stallion
1. "Realer"
2. "Megan's Piano"
3. "Freak Nasty"
4. "Simon Says"
5. "Big Ole Freak"
6. "Sex Talk"
7. "Eat It"
8. "WAP"
9. "Body"
10. "Captain Hook"
11. "Cash Shit"
12. "Cry Baby"
13. "Thot Shit"
14. "Plan B"
15. "What's New"
16. "Don't Stop"
17. "Hot Girl Summer"
18. "Sweetest Pie"
19. "Cocky AF"
20. "Savage"
Phoenix
1. "Lisztomania"
2. "Entertainment"
3. "Lasso"
4. "Too Young"
5. "Girlfriend"
6. "Trying to Be Cool" / "Drakkar Noir"
7. "J-Boy"
8. "Alpha Zulu"
9. "Armistice"
10. "Sunskrupt!"
11. "If I Ever Feel Better" / "Funky Squaredance"
12. "Ti Amo"
13. "Identical"
14. "Rome"
15. "1901"
16. "Identical" (Reprise)
The Strokes
1. "Bad Decisions"
2. "Hard to Explain"
3. "Selfless"
4. "Juicebox"
5. "Someday"
6. "Reptilia"
7. "The Adults Are Talking"
8. "You Only Live Once"
9. "Under Control"
10. "Take It or Leave It"
11. "Brooklyn Bridge to Chorus"
12. "New York City Cops"
13. "Under Cover of Darkness"

Encore

14. "Threat of Joy"
Tame Impala
1. "One More Year"
2. "Borderline"
3. "Nangs"
4. "Mind Mischief"
5. "Breathe Deeper"
6. "Elephant"
7. "The Moment"
8. "Apocalypse Dreams"
9. "Let It Happen"
10. "Feels Like We Only Go Backwards"
11. "Eventually"
12. "Runway, Houses, City, Clouds"

Encore

13. "The Less I Know the Better"
14. "New Person, Same Old Mistakes"
Tyler, the Creator
1. "CORSO"
2. "LEMONHEAD"
3. "WUSYANAME"
4. "LUMBERBACK"
5. "Come On, Let's Go"
6. "Boredom"
7. "See You Again"
8. "Who Dat Boy"
9. "Yonkers"
10. "Tamale"
11. "IFHY"
12. "I THINK"
13. "EARFQUAKE"
14. "NEW MAGIC WAND"
15. "I THOUGHT YOU WANTED TO DANCE"
16. "RUNITUP"
Yeah Yeah Yeahs
1. "Spitting Off the Edge of the World"
2. "Cheated Hearts"
3. "Pin"
4. "Under the Earth"
5. "Burning"
6. "Zero"
7. "Wolf"
8. "Soft Shock"
9. "Gold Lion"
10. "Maps"
11. "Y Control"
12. "Heads Will Roll"

Encore

13. "Date with the Night"

== Lineup ==
Headline performers are listed in boldface. Artists listed from latest to earliest set times.

=== Estrella Damm ===
Thursday, 2 June 2022	Friday, 3 June 2022	Saturday, 4 June 2022
Bad Gyal; **Tame Impala**; Kacey Musgraves; Él Mató a un Policía Motorizado	Jamie xx **The National**; Fontaines D.C. Gabriela Richardson	**Gorillaz**; **Jorja Smith**; Ferran Palau
Thursday, 9 June 2022	Friday, 10 June 2022	Saturday, 11 June 2022
**Tyler, the Creator**; **Gorillaz**; Khruangbin; Él Mató a un Policía Motorizado	Run the Jewels; **The Strokes**; Brittany Howard; Triángulo de Amor Bizarro	**Megan Thee Stallion**; **Tame Impala**; **Jorja Smith**; Soleá Morente

=== Pull&Bear ===
Thursday, 2 June 2022	Friday, 3 June 2022	Saturday, 4 June 2022
**Pavement**; Charli XCX; Joey Bada$$	Caribou; **Beck**; Manel	**Tyler, the Creator**; **Nick Cave and the Bad Seeds**; Einstürzende Neubauten
Thursday, 9 June 2022	Friday, 10 June 2022	Saturday, 11 June 2022
**Dua Lipa**; **Interpol**; Amyl and the Sniffers	M.I.A. **Lorde**; Hurray for the Riff Raff	**Phoenix**; **Yeah Yeah Yeahs**; Antònia Font

=== Binance ===
Thursday, 2 June 2022	Friday, 3 June 2022	Saturday, 4 June 2022
Big Freedia; Cigarettes After Sex; Sharon Van Etten; Les Savy Fav; Rombo	King Gizzard & the Lizard Wizard; Warpaint; Amaia; Weyes Blood; Cariño	Beach House; Bauhaus; Black Country, New Road; Low; Enny
Thursday, 9 June 2022	Friday, 10 June 2022	Saturday, 11 June 2022
Bad Gyal; Metronomy; Ride; Dry Cleaning; Alex Cameron	Remi Wolf; The Jesus and Mary Chain; Courtney Barnett; Sampa the Great; Nueva Vulcano	Sen Senra; Angèle; Sky Ferreira; Shellac; Genesis Owusu

=== Cupra ===
Thursday, 2 June 2022	Friday, 3 June 2022	Saturday, 4 June 2022
Myd (Live); DJ Shadow; Fred again.. Yo La Tengo; Dinosaur Jr. Faye Webster	MARICAS & ISAbella; Mogwai; Rigoberta Bandini; Little Simz; Wet Leg; Beach Bunny; Los Hermanos Cubero	Dave P. Disclosure; Idles; King Krule; María José Llergo; Les Amazones d'Afrique
Thursday, 9 June 2022	Friday, 10 June 2022	Saturday, 11 June 2022
Bad Boy Chiller Crew; Bicep; Playboi Carti; Slowdive; Squid; Future Utopia; Agoraphobia	Danny L Harle; Nicola Cruz; The Smile; Giveon; Marina Herlop; Tarquim	DJ Coco; DJ Seinfeld; Jessie Ware; Mogwai; Celeste; Angel Bat Dawid

=== Plenitude ===
Thursday, 2 June 2022	Friday, 3 June 2022	Saturday, 4 June 2022
Kampire & Decay; Black Midi; 100 gecs The Armed; Amaarae; Richard Dawson & Circle; Carla	Young Marco; Mainline Magic Orchestra; Earl Sweatshirt; Parquet Courts; Shellac; Helado Negro; Chaqueta de Chándal	Leon Vynehall; Shame; DIIV; Caroline Polachek; Jawbox; Tim Burgess; Porridge Radio
Thursday, 9 June 2022	Friday, 10 June 2022	Saturday, 11 June 2022
Moonchild Sanelly; Mdou Moctar; A. G. Cook; Big Thief; Jay Electronica; Ferran Palau; Casero	Unai Muguruza; Special Interest; Yeule; IC3PEAK; Stella Donnelly; Cautious Clay; Apartamentos Acapulco	Altın Gün; Molchat Doma; Viagra Boys; Fred again.. Rolling Blackouts Coastal Fever; The Weather Station; Pond

=== Ouigo ===
Thursday, 2 June 2022	Friday, 3 June 2022	Saturday, 4 June 2022
Otoboke Beaver; Black Lips; Carolina Durante; Gustaf; The Linda Lindas; Aiko el grupo Verde Prato	Lightning Bolt; Iosonouncane; Jehnny Beth; Za! & la TransMegaCobla; Tropical Fuck Storm; Pond; Pinpilinpussies	Boy Harsher; Biscuit; Napalm Death; Abbath; Automatic; 107 Faunos; Guineu
Thursday, 9 June 2022	Friday, 10 June 2022	Saturday, 11 June 2022
Mujeres; High on Fire; Working Men's Club; Pile; Chill Mafia; Rata Negra; Bikökö	Senyawa; Dorian Electra; Priya Ragu; The Murder Capital; Tops; Menta; Marta Knight	Oranssi Pazuzu; Derby Motoreta's Burrito Kachamba; Gaahls Wyrd; Confeti de Odio; Arooj Aftab; Renaldo & Clara; Da Souza

=== Tous ===
Thursday, 2 June 2022	Friday, 3 June 2022	Saturday, 4 June 2022
Soto Asa; Hannah Diamond; Let's Eat Grandma; Rina Sawayama; Shygirl; Mabel; Oklou	Mano Le Tough; Lorenzo Senni; Kaydy Cain; Pabllo Vittar; Paloma Mami; Mariah the Scientist; Le Nais	Stingray 313 (Live); Squarepusher; Alizzz; Duki; Slowthai; Dreamcatcher; Die Katapult
Thursday, 9 June 2022	Friday, 10 June 2022	Saturday, 11 June 2022
2manydjs Charli XCX; King Gizzard & the Lizard Wizard; Ashnikko; Cazzu; Griff; Gracey; Jensen McRae	Black Coffee; Grimes (DJ set); Burna Boy; Chet Faker; Rigoberta Bandini; Khea; Maeve; CMAT	Daniel Avery (Live); Jhay Cortez; Nicki Nicole; Mura Masa; Caterina Barbieri; Sad Night Dynamite; La Zowi; Paranoid 1966

=== Dice ===
Thursday, 2 June 2022	Friday, 3 June 2022	Saturday, 4 June 2022
Honey Dijon; DJ Fra; Carista; Kareem Ali; Call Super B2B Shanti Celeste; Ivy Barkakati	Jeff Mills; Oscar Mulero; Blawan; Aurora Halal (Live); Stingray 313 (Live); Nídia; Violet; Neska	Ben Ufo; Sangre Nueva; DJ Playero; Kamma & Masalo; DJ Harvey; Norsicaa
Thursday, 9 June 2022	Friday, 10 June 2022	Saturday, 11 June 2022
Mall Grab; Haai; John Talabot; I. Jordan; Prospa; Sofia Kourtesis; Gilles Peterson; Sonido Tupinamba	VTSS; SPFDJ; Sama' Abdulhadi; Wata Igarashi (Live); Efdemin; Marco Shuttle; Mary Anne Hobbs; Stein	Goldie; Sherelle B2B Tim Reaper; Special Request; Craig Richards B2B Nicolas Lutz; Romy; Acemoma (DJ set)

=== Night Pro ===
Thursday, 2 June 2022	Friday, 3 June 2022	Saturday, 4 June 2022
The Free Fall Band; STA; Bobbi Arlo; Samuel Nagati	Pretty Happy; M(h)aol; Theodore; Spiral Vortex; Leon of Athens; Tomike; Matiah Chinaski & DJ Pere	ANGER; Tuyo; Bala Desejo; PLUMA; Lücy; Koko; Her Skin
Thursday, 9 June 2022	Friday, 10 June 2022	Saturday, 11 June 2022
Nother; Theodore; Leon of Athens; Her Skin; My Ugly Clementine	Entrópica; TroutFresh; Matiah Chinaski & DJ Pere; Spiral Vortex; Lücy	shishi PLUMA; Tuyo

=== Boiler Room X Cupra ===
Thursday, 2 June 2022	Friday, 3 June 2022	Saturday, 4 June 2022
Optimo; LCY; Tayhana; Badsista; MC Carol; Rosa Pistola; Aunty Razor; Furie Soundsystem	CCL B2B Physical Therapy; Kenny Beats; Slim Soledad; DJ Playero B2B DJ Blass; Equiknoxx ft. Gavsborg and Time Cow; Pelada; Oma Totem; Gazzi	Crystallmess B2B Cõvco; DJ Travella; Karen Nyame KG; Softchaos; Opoku
Thursday, 9 June 2022	Friday, 10 June 2022	Saturday, 11 June 2022
Casa Voyager: Alia; Mad Miran; Driss Bennis aka OCB; Carin Kelly; Malika; Moonshine x Voodoo Club: Pierre Kwenders; Slimboy Flacko x Oseka B2B; Vanyfox; Hirma; San Farafina; Malek! x Ego Morales B2B	YCO Cru Takeover: bonus round: b2b2b2b2b bast mode; Stolen Velour; aya B2B BFTT; Henzo; Clemency; 10 Years of PRÍNCIPE: DJ Marfox; DJ Firmeza; DJ Lycox; DJ Kolt	Tom Boogzim; Pastis & Buenri; Two Shell; Tygapaw; Mechatok; Zuli; JOVENDELAPERLA; La niña Jacarandá

=== NTS ===
Thursday, 2 June 2022	Friday, 3 June 2022	Saturday, 4 June 2022
Afrodeutsche; Crystallmess; Pelada; VTSS (Live); Osheyack; Martha	Deena Abdelwahed; Jasmine Infiniti; Lory D Buttechno; Valentina Magaletti; MOIN	Paquita Gordon; Terrence Dixon; ZoZo; John T. Gast; Lawrence le Doux; Mecánica Popular
Thursday, 9 June 2022	Friday, 10 June 2022	Saturday, 11 June 2022
Anz; Slikback; Gabber Modus Operandi; Duma; Oren Ambarchi / Konrad Sprenger / Phillip Sollmann; Tarta Relena	Mumdance; LCY (Live); Pangaea; Vladislav Delay; Valentino Mora (Live); Erika de Casier	Pastis & Buenri; Namasenda; Ela Minus; Acemoma (Live); Courtesy (Live)

=== Estrella Damm Sona ===
Thursday, 2 June 2022	Friday, 3 June 2022	Saturday, 4 June 2022
Archer; Nahoomie pau	Dafoe; Vonvon h waas	Nico Etorena; Sophie Lekker; Lil Vichy
Thursday, 9 June 2022	Friday, 10 June 2022	Saturday, 11 June 2022
D.N.S. La Ká, Kryper	Yozy; JMII; Cat Gabal	Cucut; NPLGNN; La Vutarda

=== Tous Sona ===
Thursday, 2 June 2022	Friday, 3 June 2022	Saturday, 4 June 2022
Love Come Down; Formica	Lumière; Malena	Nico; Marc Piñol
Thursday, 9 June 2022	Friday, 10 June 2022	Saturday, 11 June 2022
La Niña Jacarandá; DJ Owey	Deckard; Spacer	Lanav; Lydia Vilas

=== Jack Daniel's Sona ===
Thursday, 2 June 2022	Friday, 3 June 2022	Saturday, 4 June 2022
Velmondo; Angeladorrrm; Milc	Krissia; Adelaida; Maria Hein	Eterna Joventut; MTINES; Malv
Thursday, 9 June 2022	Friday, 10 June 2022	Saturday, 11 June 2022
Primer Infant; Alavedra; Les Salvatges	Futurachicapop; Los Yolos; Luces Negras	LaBlackie; Pantocrator; Enemic Interior

=== Auditori Rockdelux ===
Thursday, 2 June 2022	Friday, 3 June 2022	Saturday, 4 June 2022
Maria del Mar Bonet; Rodrigo Cuevas; Kim Gordon; Joan Miquel Oliver	Evian Christ; Autechre; Low; Marina Herlop	Jamila Woods; Mavis Staples; Jenny Hval; The Caretaker

=== Day Pro ===
Thursday, 9 June 2022
Entrópica
Spiral Vortex
Matiah Chinaski & DJ Pere
TroutFresh
Lücy
Eneritz Furyak

== Primavera a la Ciutat lineup ==
=== Bóveda ===
Monday, 6 June 2022	Wednesday, 8 June 2022
Lightning Bolt; Sandré; Dead Normal	Meet Me at the Altar; Power Burkas

=== Day Pro ===
Monday, 6 June 2022	Tuesday, 7 June 2022	Wednesday, 8 June 2022
Julieta; Bonitx; Ariox; Tuyo; Bala Desejo; PLUMA	Theodore; Leon of Athens; Koko; Her Skin; Nother; ANGER	MICE shishi My Ugly Clementine; Pretty Happy; M(h)aol; Tomike; Bobbi Arlo; Pastiche

=== La [2] Apolo ===
Sunday, 5 June 2022	Monday, 6 June 2022	Tuesday, 7 June 2022	Wednesday, 8 June 2022
Teki Latex; Flohio; L Devine; Lost Girls; Beach Bunny	DJ Playero; Los Hijos de Yayo	Marie Montexier; Victor; Noga Erez; Los Bitchos; King Hannah	Brownswood Recordings Showcase: Laani; Gilles Peterson; STR4TA; Secret Night Gang; Laani

=== La Nau ===
Monday, 6 June 2022	Tuesday, 7 June 2022	Wednesday, 8 June 2022
Jockstrap; Alanaire	Bandalos Chinos; Penelope Isles	An Evening with 4AD: Erika de Casier; Dry Cleaning; Maria Somerville

=== La Tèxtil ===
Sunday, 5 June 2022	Monday, 6 June 2022	Tuesday, 7 June 2022	Wednesday, 8 June 2022
Lablackie + Polemik; Khaled	Yung Prado; Gazzi; KeiyaA; Mike; Ikram Bouloum	Awesome Tapes From Africa: Awesome Tapes (DJ set); Hailu Mergia; Sourakata Koité	Philip Sherburne; Eli Winter + Cameron Knowler; KMRU; Yasmin Williams

=== Laut ===
Sunday, 5 June 2022	Monday, 6 June 2022	Tuesday, 7 June 2022	Wednesday, 8 June 2022
Cønjuntø Vacíø Showcase: MT Formula; Verushka Sirit; Julio Tornero; SDH; Coàgul; Seltar; Aufwachen	Hivern Discs: John Talabot; Sabla & Sara Berts; Holy Tongue; Cucina Povera; Nexcyia; John Talabot (DJ set)	Two Shell; John Glacier; Ethan P. Flynn; Marina Herlop	DJ Diaki; Authentically Plastic; DJ Travella; Turkana; MC Yallah & Debmaster; Otim Alpha; Aunty Rayzor; Duma; Mbodj

=== Paral.lel 62 ===
Sunday, 5 June 2022	Monday, 6 June 2022	Tuesday, 7 June 2022	Wednesday, 8 June 2022
Lizz; Saramalacara; Dillom; Chill Mafia	Austrohúngaro; The Magnetic Fields; Hidrogenesse	Diverso: Hi-Ki + La Diabla + Alvva; L'Impératrice; Renaldo & Clara; Maria Jaume	D.R.O.P: Beniso + Bonnie Soul; Jorja Smith; Priya Ragu; Ona Mafalda

=== Poble Espanyol ===
Wednesday, 1 June 2022	Sunday, 5 June 2022	Wednesday, 8 June 2022
Rina Sawayama; Teto Preto; Wet Leg; The Linda Lindas	Paloma Mami; Cuco; Boy Pablo; El Petit de Cal Eril	Phoenix; Khruangbin; Ride; Magdalena Bay; Pom Pom Squad

=== Razzmatazz ===
Sunday, 5 June 2022	Monday, 6 June 2022	Tuesday, 7 June 2022	Wednesday, 8 June 2022
Kero Kero Bonito; Beck; Jehnny Beth	YEAR0001 Rift: Lokey; Dark0; Torus; Femi; Mechatok; Emiranda; Drain Gang (Bladee, Ecco2k, Thaiboy Digital); Yung Lean	Dance System; Derby Motoreta's Burrito Kachamba; Slowdive; King Gizzard & the Lizard Wizard; Therematic	Bad Gyal's Gogo Club; Megan Thee Stallion; La Zowi; Albany

=== Razzmatazz 2 ===
Sunday, 5 June 2022	Monday, 6 June 2022	Tuesday, 7 June 2022	Wednesday, 8 June 2022
Secretly Group Party: BRAVA; Shame; Alex Cameron; Jamila Woods; Fenne Lily	Virginie; King Gizzard & the Lizard Wizard; Beak> Spellling; Aksak Maboul	Naguiyami; Kamaal Williams; Wesley Joseph; Lord Apex; Ben Yart	PC Music Presents Acid Angel: Dorian Electra; 100 gecs; Kero Kero Bonito; A. G. Cook; Hannah Diamond; Hyd; Namasenda; Easyfun; Putochinomaricón

=== Red58 ===
Sunday, 5 June 2022	Tuesday, 7 June 2022	Wednesday, 8 June 2022
Evian Christ; Doss; Anne Savage	Harlecore: Danny L Harle + DJ Pastis + Buenri	Goldie; Mad Miran; Kinetic

=== Sala Apolo ===
Sunday, 5 June 2022	Monday, 6 June 2022	Tuesday, 7 June 2022	Wednesday, 8 June 2022
DJ Fra; Dave P. Les Savy Fav; King Gizzard & the Lizard Wizard; Iceage	Shabaka Hutchings Presents London Healing: The Soul Jazz Records Sound System; Sons of Kemet; Steam Down; Soccer 96; III Considered	BEAK> (DJ set); Enny; Jorja Smith; Nala Sinephro; Doble Pletina	DJ Playero; Unai Muguruza; Chet Faker; Interpol; Vulk

=== Sala Vol ===
Sunday, 5 June 2022	Tuesday, 7 June 2022	Wednesday, 8 June 2022
Jawbox; Saïm	ANGER; Tuyo; The Free Fall Band	Nother; Koko; Her Skin

=== Sidecar ===
Sunday, 5 June 2022	Monday, 6 June 2022	Tuesday, 7 June 2022	Wednesday, 8 June 2022
Jehnny Beth (DJ set); Tropical Fuck Storm; Automatic	Sinead O'Brien; Cassandra Jenkins	Pile; Twin	Él Mató a un Policía Motorizado; 107 Faunos

=== UPLOAD ===
Wednesday, 1 June 2022	Wednesday, 8 June 2022
Debit; DJ Travella; KOKOKO! De1l Girlz × Dani Rev	Xtrarradio (DJ set); Frankie and the Witch Fingers

== Brunch on the Beach lineup ==
=== Dice ===
Sunday, 12 June 2022
Peggy Gou
Monolink
Nicola Cruz (DJ set)
Chaos in the CBD
Malika

=== Tous ===
Sunday, 12 June 2022
Nina Kraviz
Amelie Lens
Hector Oaks
Joyhauser
Anika Kunst

== Gallery ==
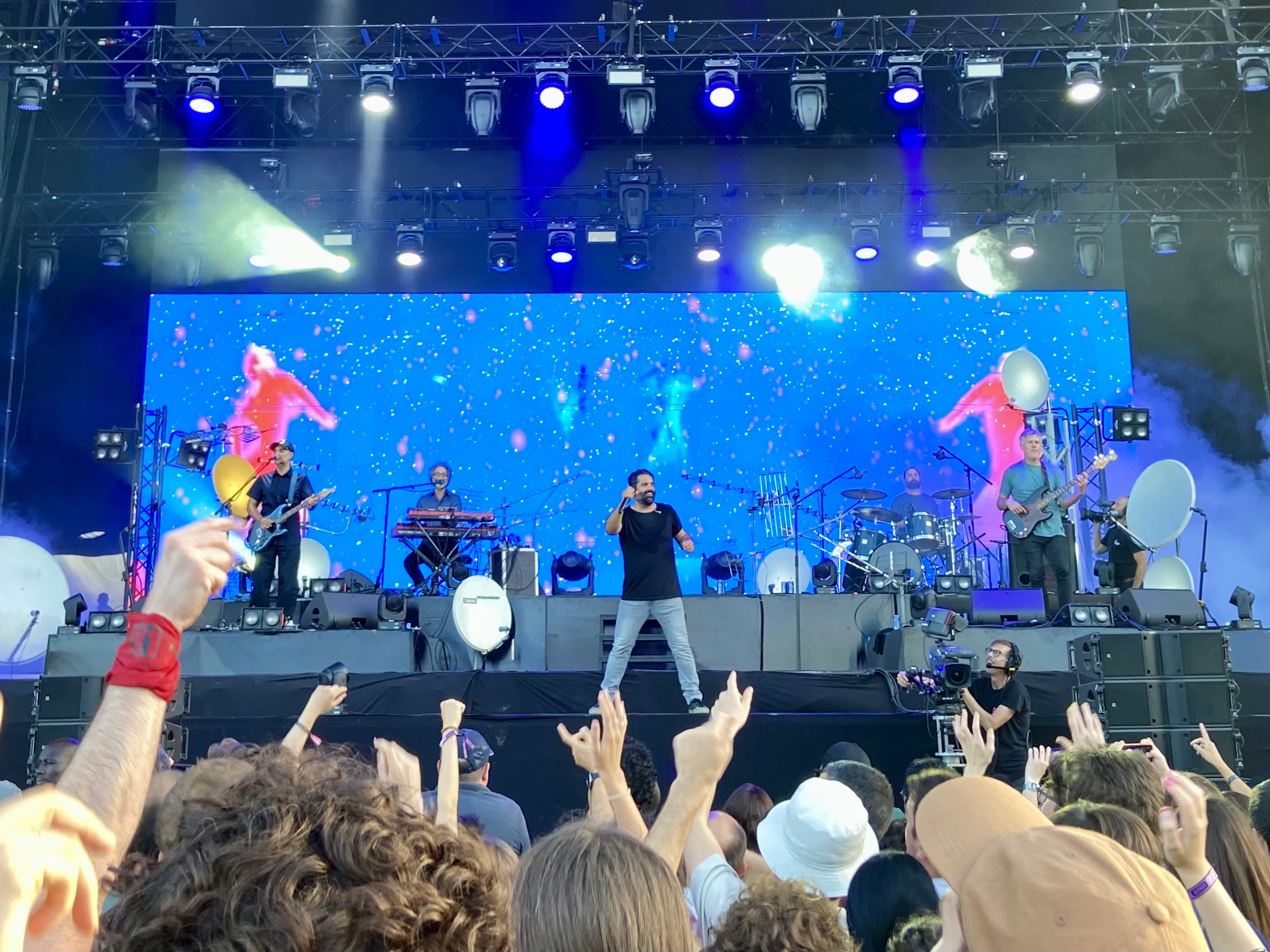
Antònia Font performing on 11 June.

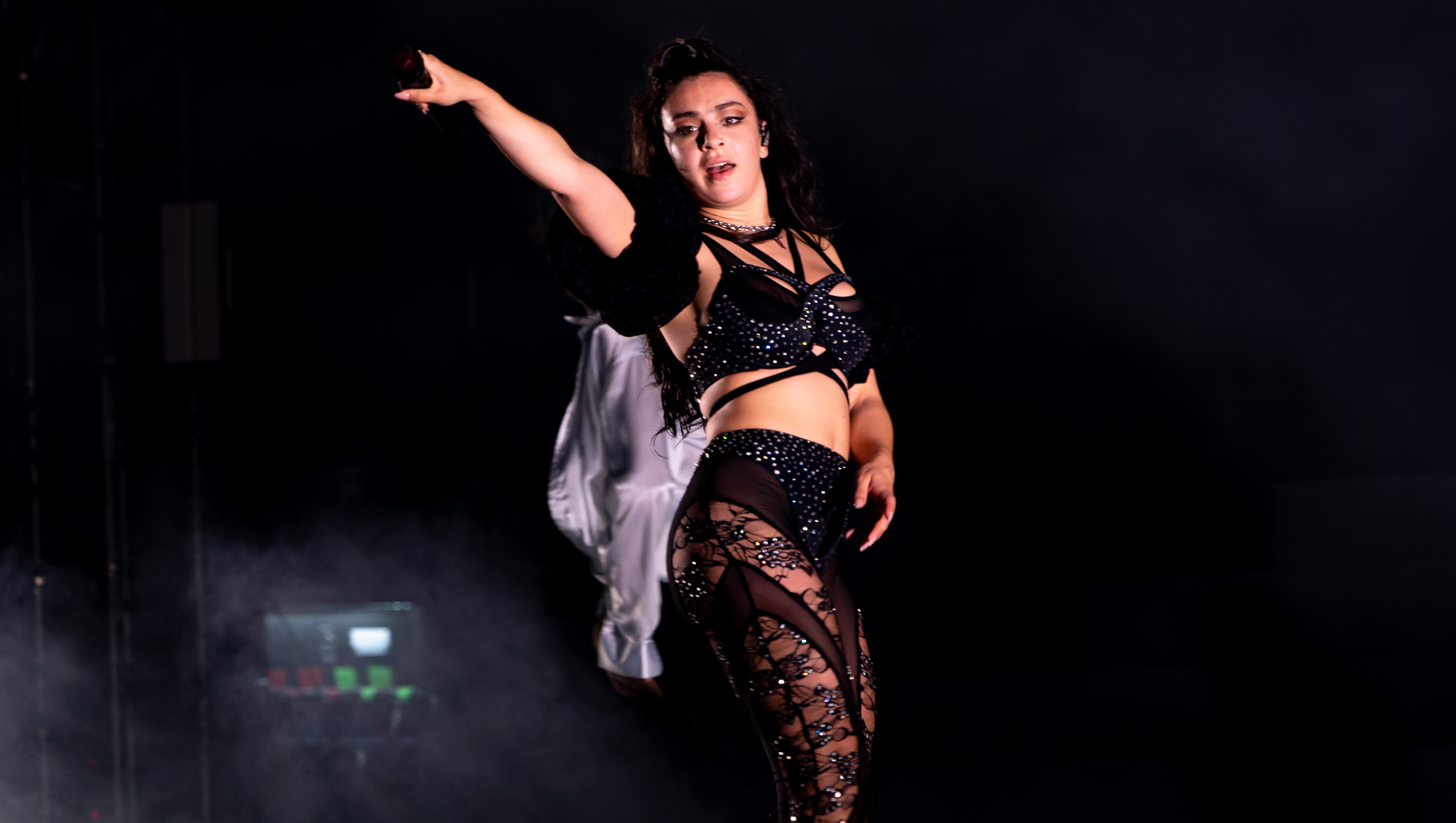
Charli XCX performing on 2 June.

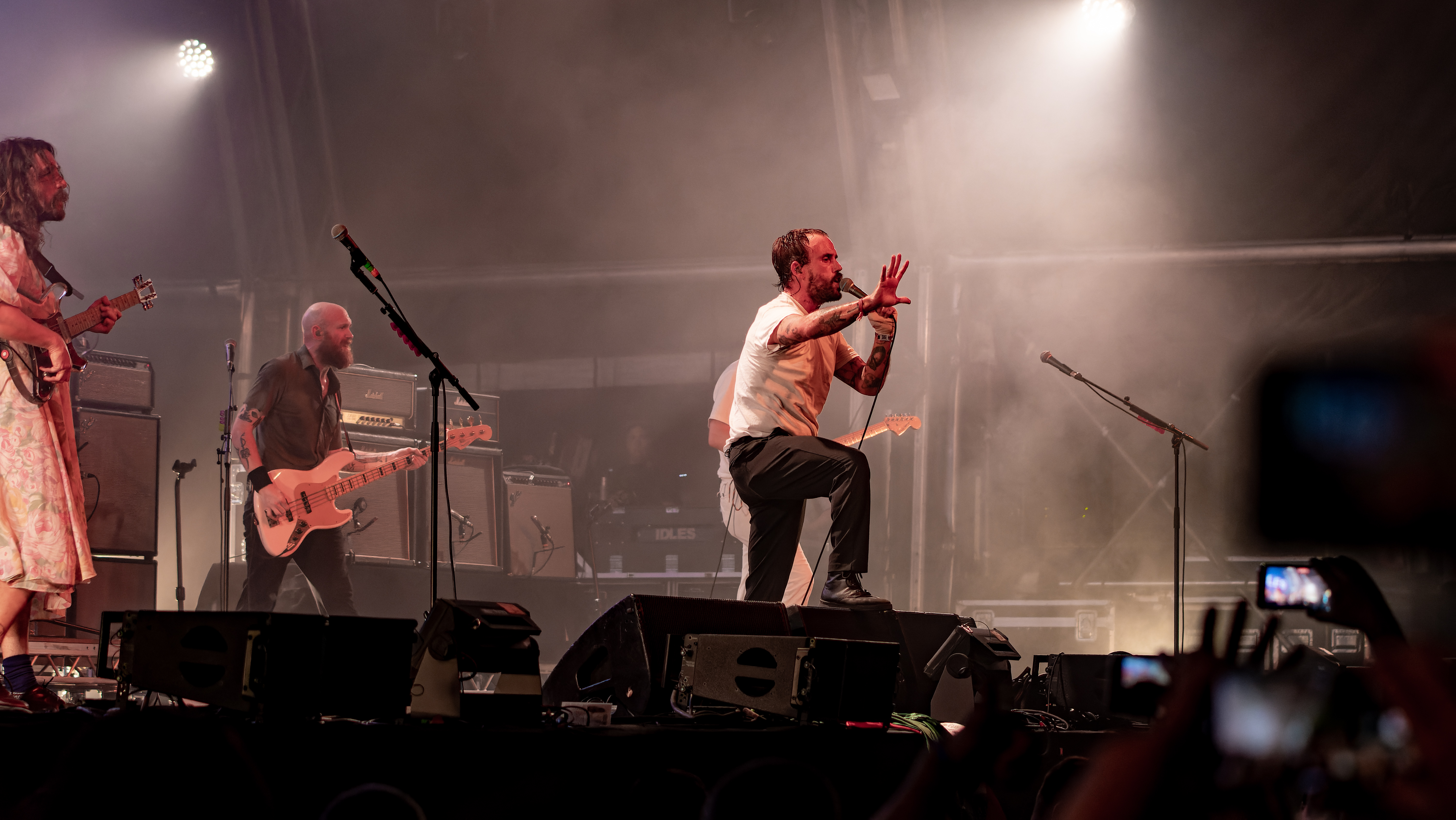
Idles performing on 5 June.

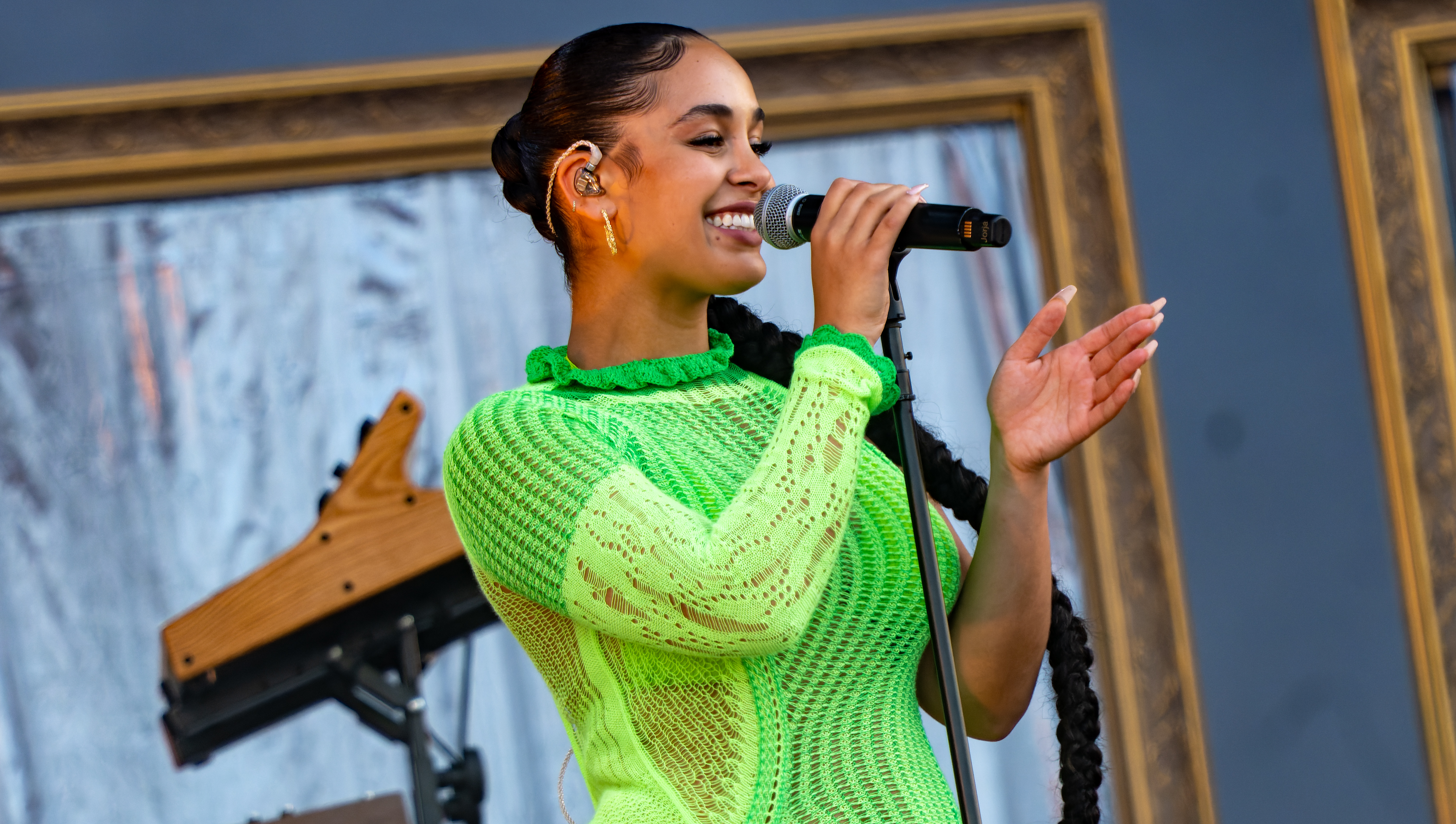
Jorja Smith performing on 4 June.

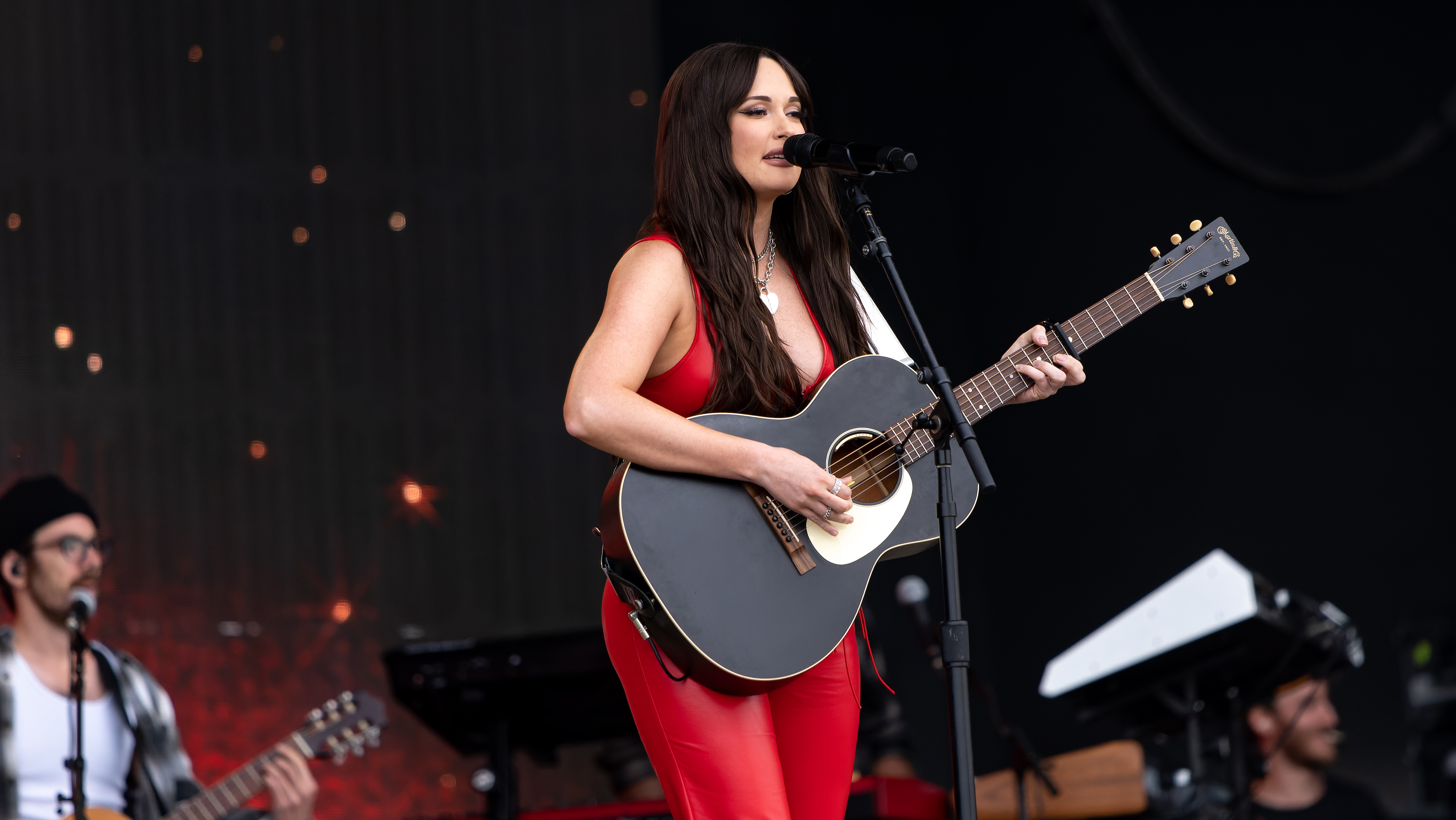
Kacey Musgraves performing on 2 June.

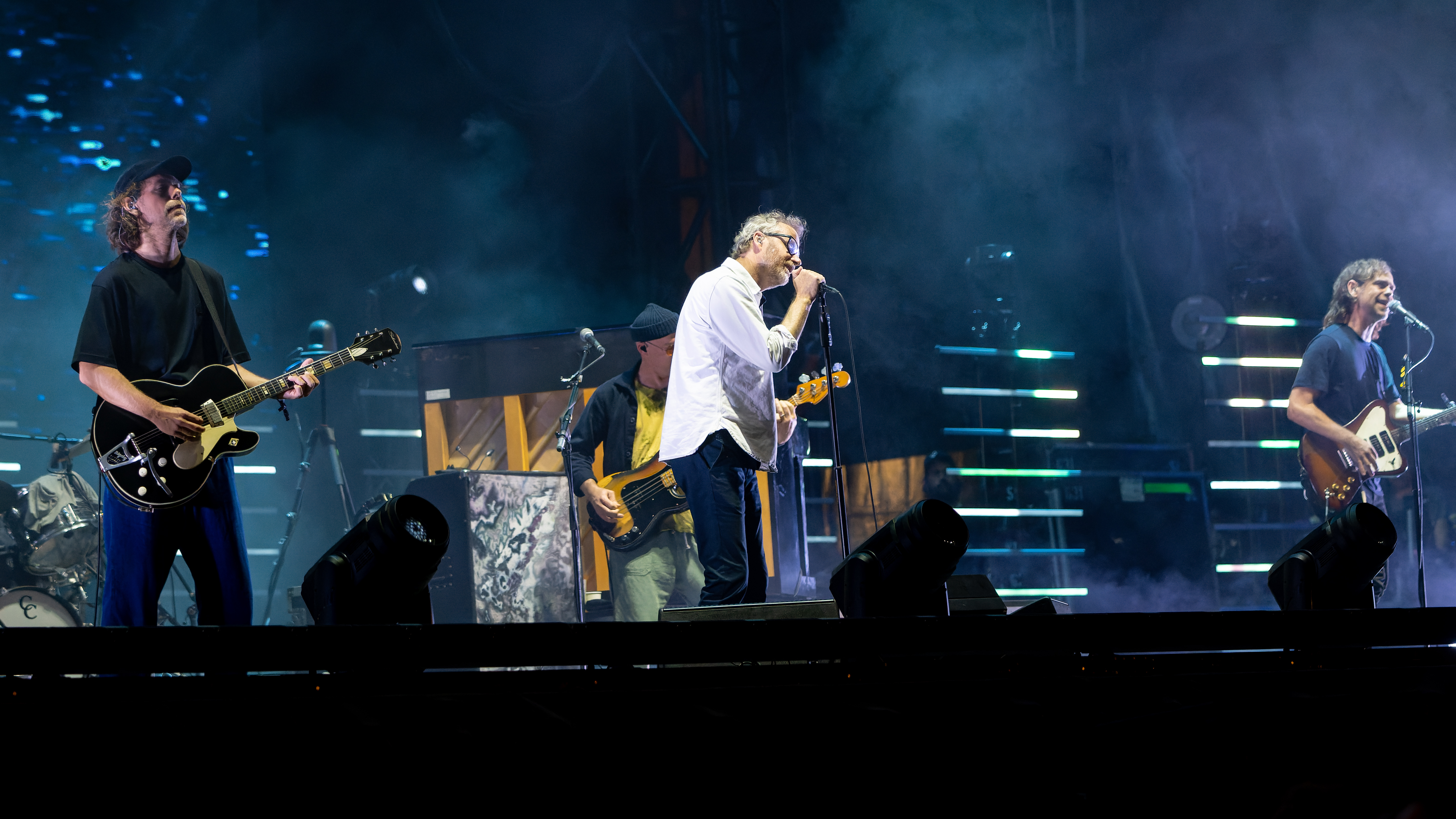
The National performing on 3 June.

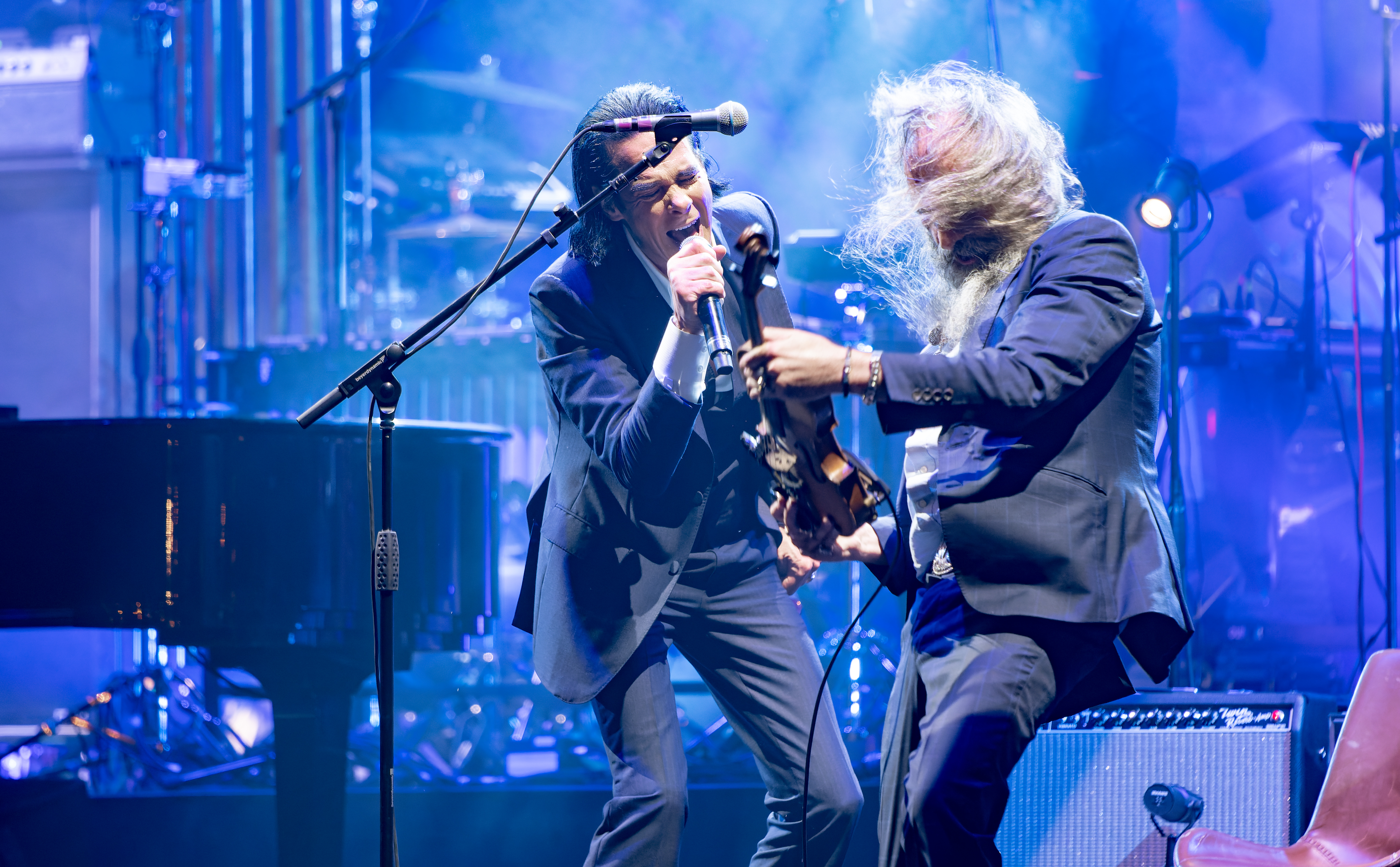
Nick Cave and the Bad Seeds performing on 4 June.

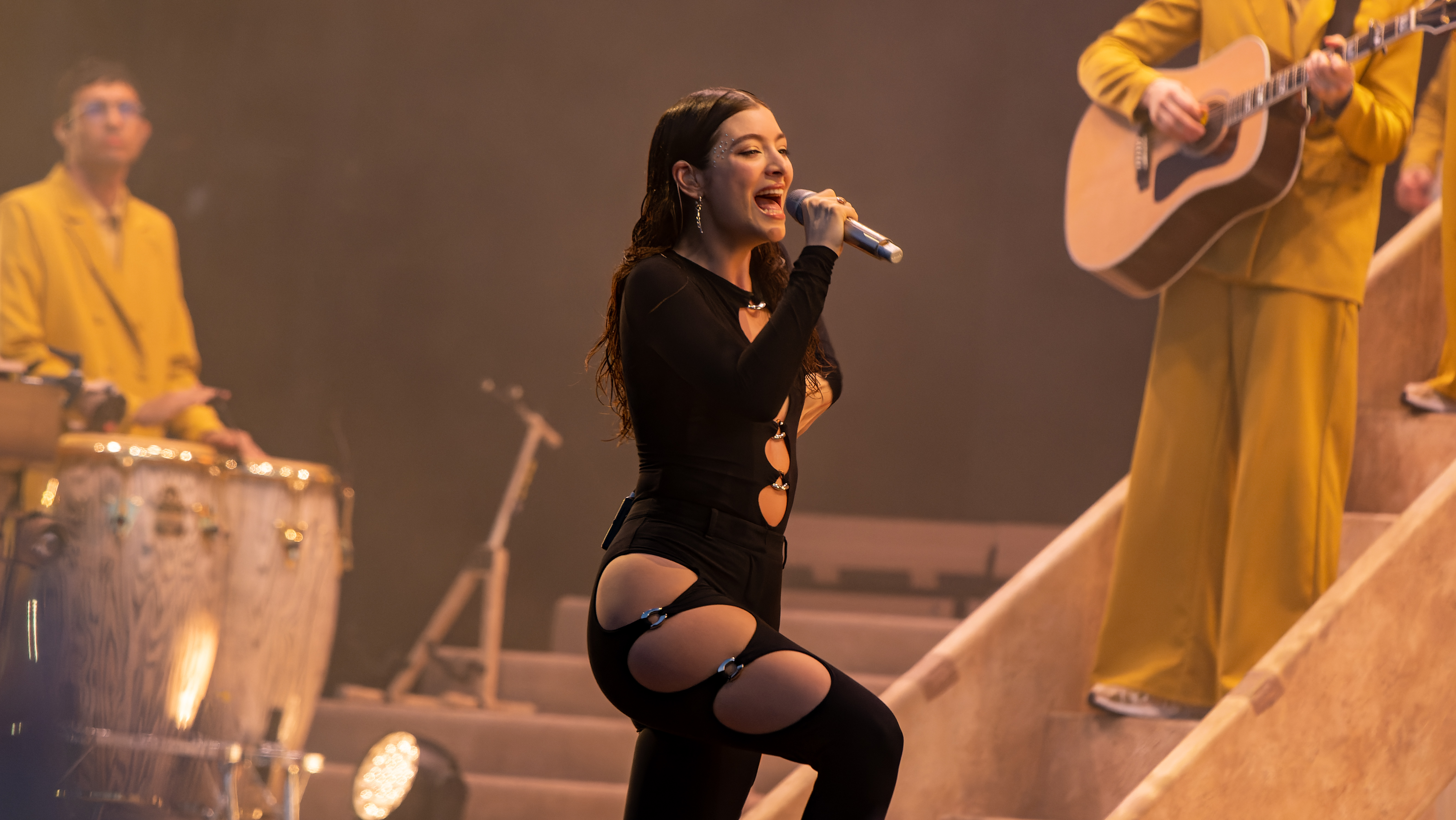
Lorde performing on 10 June.

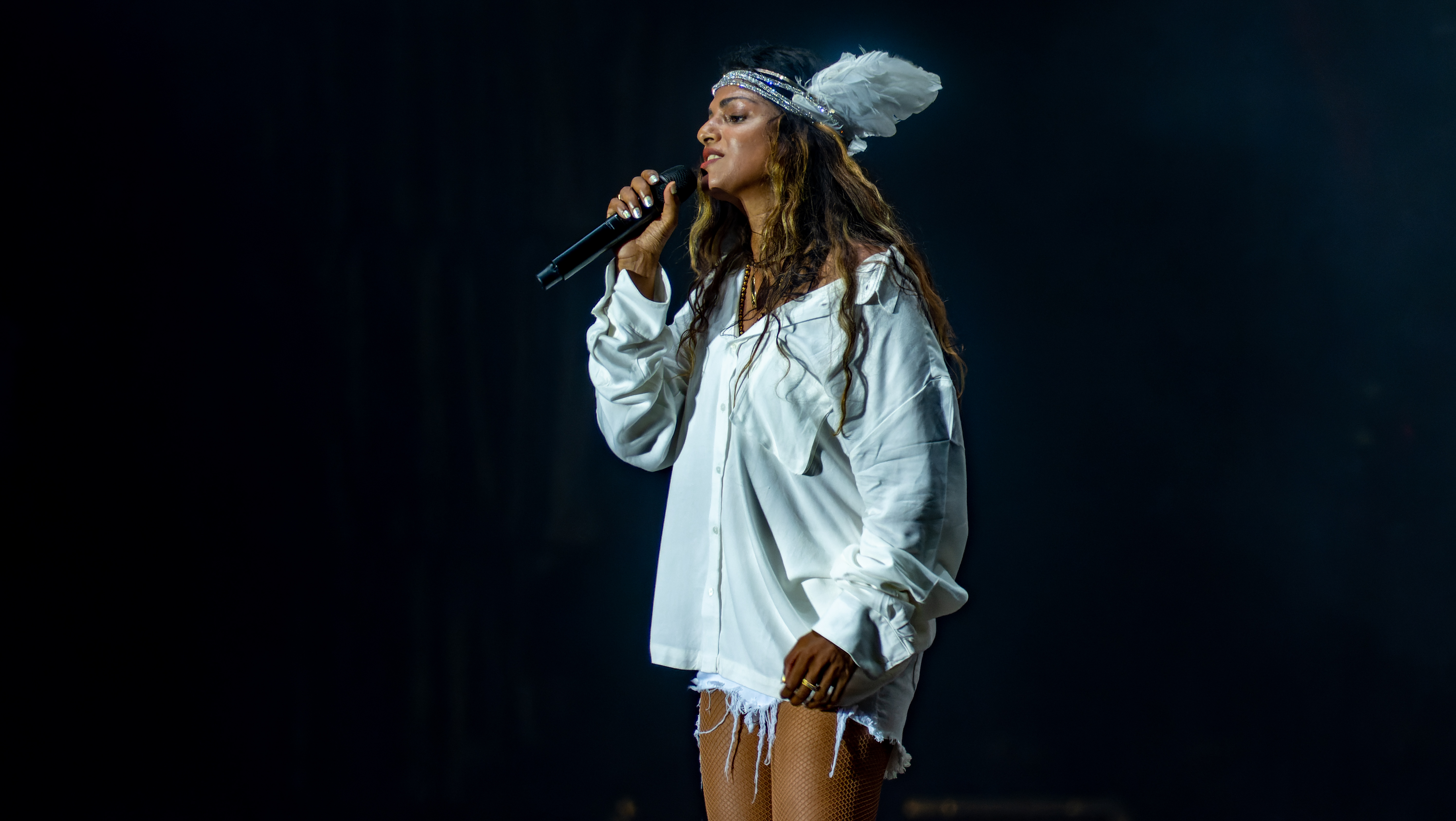
M.I.A. performing on 10 June.

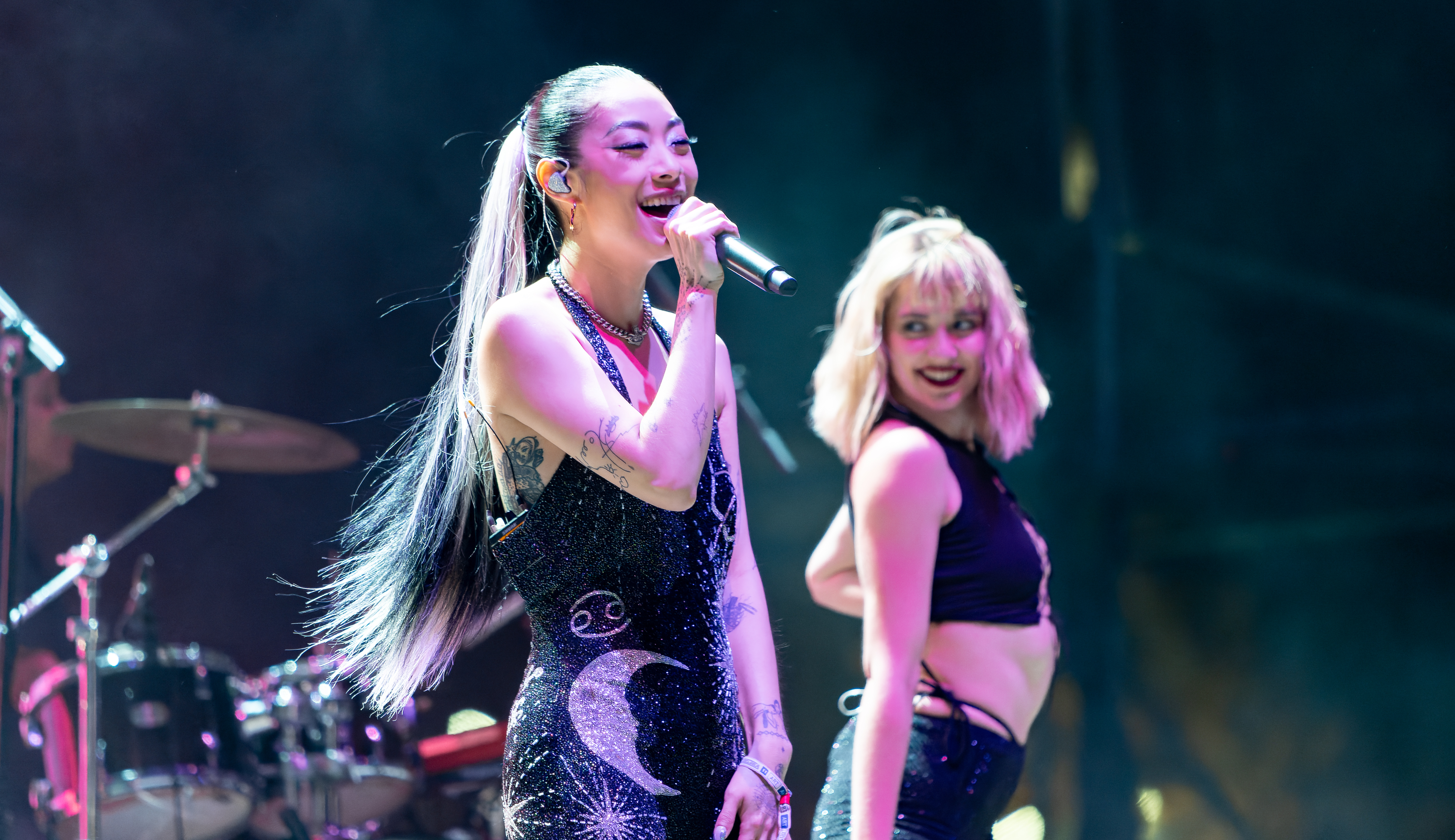
Rina Sawayama performing on 2 June.

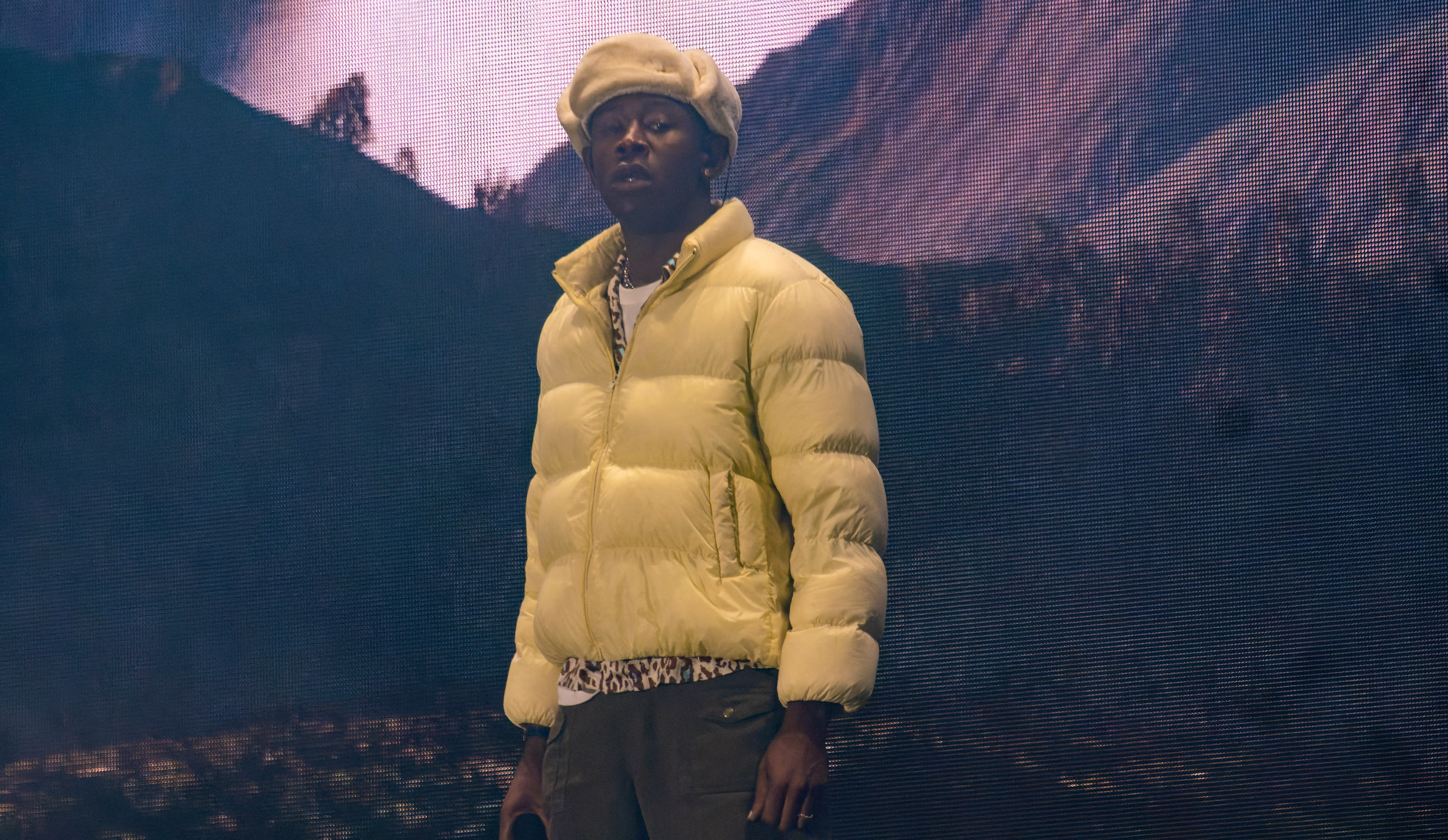
Tyler, the Creator performing on 4 June.

== Cancelled acts ==
- Afrikan Sciences
- Bestia Bebé
- Bikini Kill
- Bleachers
- Clairo
- DJ Black Low
- Georgia
- girl in red
- Holly Humberstone
- Kehlani
- King Princess
- Lingua Ignota
- Little Simz (5 June performance)
- La Mafia del Amor
- Massive Attack
- Pa Salieu
- PinkPantheress
- Rapsody
- Tainy
- The Strokes (3 June performance)
