= Randy Merrill =

American mastering engineer

- Origin: Jamestown, New York, US
- Genres: Alternative rock; pop; pop rock; R&B; electronica
- Occupation: Mastering engineer
- Years active: 2006–present
- Website: sterling-sound.com/engineer/randy-merrill/

Randy Merrill is an American mastering engineer. Merrill attended Jamestown Community College before graduating from State University of New York at Fredonia with a degree in Sound Recording Technology. He then became a mastering engineer at Masterdisk in 2008 before moving to Sterling Sound in 2013. At Sterling, Merrill worked alongside Tom Coyne winning four Grammys, including wins for Adele's 25, and Mark Ronson's "Uptown Funk". Merrill's mastering work would go on to win Grammys independently for Beck's Colors, Ariana Grande's Sweetener, Lady Gaga's "Shallow", and Cage the Elephant's Social Cues. Merrill currently works out of Sterling Sound in Edgewater, New Jersey.

== Filmography ==
Awards and nominations received by Randy Merrill
Year	Film	Notes
2024	Challengers	mastering credits for soundtrack
2026	The Devil Wears Prada 2	mastering credits for soundtrack

== Awards and nominations ==
=== Grammy Awards ===
Awards and nominations received by Randy Merrill
Year	Category	Nominated work	Result	Ref.
2017	Record of the Year	"Hello"	Won	
2017	Album of the Year	25	Won	
2017	Album of the Year	Purpose	Nominated	
2018	Album of the Year	Melodrama	Nominated	
2019	Record of the Year	"Shallow"	Nominated	
2019	Best Engineered Album, Non-Classical	Colors	Won	
2020	Record of the Year	"7 Rings"	Nominated	
2020	Album of the Year	Thank U, Next	Nominated	
2021	Album of the Year	Folklore	Won	
2021	Best Engineered Album, Non-Classical	Hyperspace	Won	
2022	Record of the Year	"Leave the Door Open"	Won	
2022	Record of the Year	"Drivers License"	Nominated	
2022	Album of the Year	Montero	Nominated	
2022	Album of the Year	Sour	Nominated	
2022	Best Engineered Album, Non-Classical	Dawn	Nominated	
2023	Record of the Year	"As It Was"	Nominated	
2023	Record of the Year	"Easy on Me"	Nominated	
2023	Album of the Year	Harry's House	Won	
2023	Album of the Year	30	Nominated	
2023	Album of the Year	Music of the Spheres	Nominated	
2023	Best Engineered Album, Non-Classical	Harry's House	Won	
2024	Record of the Year	"Anti-Hero"	Nominated	
2024	Record of the Year	"Vampire"	Nominated	
2024	Record of the Year	"What Was I Made For?"	Nominated	
2024	Album of the Year	Midnights	Won	
2024	Album of the Year	Guts	Nominated	
2025	Record of the Year	"Good Luck, Babe!"	Nominated	
2025	Record of the Year	"Fortnight"	Nominated	
2025	Album of the Year	The Rise and Fall of a Midwest Princess	Nominated	
2025	Album of the Year	The Tortured Poets Department	Nominated	
2026	Record of the Year	"The Subway"	Nominated	
2026	Record of the Year	"Abracadabra"	Nominated	
2026	Album of the Year	Mayhem	Nominated	
