= Pastis & Buenri =

Spanish Band

- Origin: Barcelona, Spain
- Genres: Mákina, hardcore, rave
- Years active: 1995- present
- Labels: DJ's At Work, Uptempo, Xque Records, Bit Music
- Members: David Àlvarez Tudela; David Pàmies Sabatés

Pastis & Buenri is a Spanish production duo and DJs, composed of David Álvarez Tudela and David Pàmies Sabatés. The group plays mákina music, which was popular in Spain throughout the mid-1990s.

== Musical career ==
The group was formed in the early 1990s in Barcelona, Spain. In 1996, the duo became the main attraction of the now famous nightclub Xque. In the early 2000, the group appeared live among DJ Skudero and Xavi Metralla, in a mini disco named Música Sí on the TV channel Spanish TVE1. In 2003, the group released a compilation album titled DJ Makina Vol. 3 in France, distributed by Wagram Music.

=== Singles ===
Year	Single	Peak positions	Album
Year	Single	ESP	Album
1996	"Pildo"	2	Singles only
1997	"Vol. 1 - Attack (The New Generation)"	—	Singles only
1997	"Vol. 2 - In Vino Veritas"	—	Singles only
1998	"Amazon-E" (with CJ Rolo)	—	Singles only
1998	"The Noise Sindicate" (with Frank T.R.A.X.)	—	Singles only
1998	"Adrenalin"	—	Singles only
2000	"Game Over II" (with DJ Ruboy)	—	Singles only
2000	"I Need Your Lovin/Different Melody" (with DJ Uraken)	—	Singles only
2002	"I'm Sailing/Hypnotize"	—	Singles only
2004	"Stripped" (Remix)	—	Singles only
"—" denotes releases that did not chart
