= Colors (Beck album) =

Studio album by Beck
- Released: October 13, 2017
- Recorded: 2013–2017
- Genres: Pop; dance-rock; hip-hop; experimental pop; pop rock
- Length: 39:39
- Label: Fonograf Records/Capitol
- Producers: Greg Kurstin; Beck Hansen; Cole M.G.N.

Beck chronology
Morning Phase (2014)	Colors (2017)	Paisley Park Sessions (2019)

Singles from Colors
- 1. "Dreams" Released: June 15, 2015; 2. "Wow" Released: June 2, 2016; 3. "Dear Life" Released: September 8, 2017; 4. "Up All Night" Released: September 18, 2017; 5. "Colors" Released: April 10, 2018

Colors is the thirteenth studio album by American musician Beck, released on October 13, 2017, by Fonograf Records & Capitol Records. The album was recorded between 2013 and 2017, with Beck producing alongside Greg Kurstin. The album's earliest single, "Dreams", was released in June 2015, while three more singles ("Wow", "Dear Life" in Italy and "Up All Night" in the US) were released between June 2016 and September 2017. The title track was also released as a single in April 2018. The album won the Best Alternative Music Album and Best Engineered Album, Non-Classical at the 61st Annual Grammy Awards.

== Production ==
Colors was recorded at Greg Kurstin's Los Angeles studio between 2013 and 2017, with Beck and Kurstin playing nearly every instrument themselves. Beck described the recording process to music publication NME, saying, "for the first year, we were experimenting and there was a lot of trial and error. I was touring constantly while making it, so I was attempting to bring some of that energy back to the studio, which isn't always the easiest thing to do. 'Dreams' was one of the early songs to come along and make me think the idea had legs."

== Composition ==
Q described "Seventh Heaven" as a "lost '80s pop classic" and "Dear Life" as "lush Beatles-like psychedelia spiked with an existential cry-for-help for a lyric." Beck told Q that "Dear Life is just about the inevitable turmoil of being alive. Like, can somebody throw me a lifeline here?" The New York Times observed that "No Distraction" had "a strummy guitar part over a foursquare rock beat, and a chord progression partly cribbed from the Police" and that "Dear Life" was "a late-Beatles-esque existential cry, with a welcome core of oddness within its retro shell." Beck discussed "No Distraction" with Q, saying, "Anybody who has a phone or computer lives with the distractions pulling you this way and that. We haven't figured out how to have access to everybody and everything all the time and how it affects us physically and neurologically. Or at least I haven't. My analogy to friends has been that I feel as if somebody has removed the front door of my house, permanently."

In an interview with NME, Beck said, "the rest of the album is probably what exists in the range between 'Dreams' at one end and 'Wow' at the other." In an interview with Rolling Stone, he commented further, saying, "these are complex songs all trying to do two or three things at once. It's not retro and not modern. To get everything to sit together so it doesn't sound like a huge mess was quite an undertaking."

== Release ==
On July 28, 2017, Beck teased the title of his new album by posting a photo of John Baldessari's "Tips for Artists Who Want to Sell" on his Instagram account. His post followed an accidental leak of the title and release date by an online retailer's private pre-order page briefly being set to public viewing. On August 11, Beck officially announced the album would be titled Colors and released in October 2017. The music video for "Up All Night" premiered August 9, 2017, at the ArcLight Hollywood during an all-day conference for Capitol Records, where it was announced it would be released to the public in the near future and would be Colors' third official single. "Up All Night" previously appeared in the video game FIFA 17 and was used in a commercial for Fossil smartwatches. A special version of the album was released through Barnes & Noble with a slightly different cover, and on white vinyl.

== Promotion ==
"Dreams" was released on June 15, 2015, as the lead single from an upcoming album, later announced to be titled Colors. The upbeat track was inspired by MGMT and marked a contrast to the somber mood of Beck's previous album, Morning Phase (2014). Beck said at the time, "I was really trying to make something that would be good to play live." The song was heavily featured on Beats 1, Apple Music's flagship radio station, with 65 plays in July 2015. "Dreams" was ranked among the best songs of 2015 on annual year-end lists by Rolling Stone and Billboard. The single version mix was not included on physical copies of the album and a new mix is included as the album's sixth track. "Dreams" peaked at number two on Billboard's Alternative Songs chart.

"Wow" (sometimes stylized as "WOW") was released on June 2, 2016, as the second single, and it was confirmed that the new album was scheduled to be released on October 21, 2016. That release date was later delayed and scrubbed from Beck's PR site with no explanation given. Beck told KROQ that "Wow" "was completely off the top of my head. I didn't write any of it. It was just us fooling around in the studio. I didn't even mean to release it. I was working on another song and came up with the riff and then I just started freestyling." "Wow" was included on Billboard's 100 Best Pop Songs of 2016" list.

"Dear Life" was released as an "instant gratification" track from Colors on August 24, 2017, to coincide with the release of the album's pre-order. It received support at triple-A radio in the United States and was sent to top 40 radio in Italy on September 8, 2017, as the album's third international single.

"Up All Night" was released to triple-A radio September 18, 2017, as the album's third single in the United States. It was then sent to alternative radio September 19, 2017. "Up All Night" peaked at number one on Billboard's Alternative Songs chart, becoming Beck's third chart topper and first since 2005's "E-Pro".

"Colors" was sent to alternative radio on April 10, 2018, as the album's fourth single in the United States. A video was released exclusively for Apple Music on March 29, 2018, directed by Edgar Wright and featuring Alison Brie. The song "Colors" was later included as a demo project in the program Logic Pro.

Beck's team held pop-up shops to promote the album release at famous markets around the US, including the Melrose Trading Post in Los Angeles, CA, the Brooklyn Flea Soho & Brooklyn Flea Dumbo in NYC, the Fremont Market in Seattle, WA, and the Vintage Garage in Chicago, IL.

== Reception ==
Professional ratings
Aggregate scores
Source	Rating
AnyDecentMusic?	6.3/10
Metacritic	72/100
Review scores
Source	Rating
AllMusic	3.5/5 stars
The A.V. Club	B
Entertainment Weekly	B+
The Guardian	3/5 stars
The Independent	3/5 stars
NME	4/5 stars
Pitchfork	6.3/10
Q	4/5 stars
Rolling Stone	4/5 stars
Uncut	8/10

=== Critical ===
Colors received generally positive reviews from music critics. On Metacritic, which assigns a normalized rating out of 100 to reviews from mainstream critics, the album has an average score of 72 out of 100 based on 34 reviews, which indicates "generally favorable reviews".

=== Commercial ===
Colors debuted at number three on the US Billboard 200 with 46,000 album-equivalent units, of which 41,000 were pure album sales. It is Beck's sixth US top 10 album.

=== Accolades ===
Publication	Accolade	Year	Rank	Ref.
NME	NME's Albums of the Year	2017	30	

== Track listing ==
All tracks written and produced by Beck Hansen and Greg Kurstin, except where otherwise noted.

No.	Title	Writer(s)	Producer(s)	Length
1.	"Colors"			4:21
2.	"Seventh Heaven"			5:00
3.	"I'm So Free"			4:07
4.	"Dear Life"			3:44
5.	"No Distraction"			4:32
6.	"Dreams" (Colors mix)	Hansen, Kurstin, Andrew Wyatt		4:57
7.	"Wow"	Hansen, Cole M.G.N.	Hansen, M.G.N.	3:40
8.	"Up All Night"			3:10
9.	"Square One"			2:55
10.	"Fix Me"	Hansen	Hansen	3:13
Total length:				39:39

Digital download and streaming bonus track
No.	Title	Writer(s)	Producer(s)	Length
11.	"Dreams" (single version)	Hansen, Kurstin, Wyatt	Kurstin	5:14
Total length:				44:53

== Personnel ==
Musicians

- Beck Hansen – vocals, guitar, piano, Rhodes, organ, synthesizers, bass guitar, glockenspiel, percussion
- Greg Kurstin – guitar, bass guitar, drums, piano, synthesizers, clavinet, Rhodes, mellotron, marimba, organ, percussion
- Roger Joseph Manning Jr. – background vocals (tracks 1–3, 5)
- Dwayne Moore – additional bass (track 6)
- Ilan Rubin – drums (track 3)
- Feist – background vocals (track 3)
- Charlie Bisharat – violin (concert master)
- Mario de Léon – violin
- Songa Lee – violin
- Natalie Leggett – violin
- Sara Parkins – violin
- Michele Richards – violin
- Tereza Stanislav – violin
- Josefina Vergara – violin
- Andrew Duckles – principal viola
- Steve Richards – principal cello
- Eric Byers – cello
- Suzie Katayama – cello
- Timothy Landauer – cello
- Nico Abondolom – double bass
- Geoff Osika – double bass

Technical

- Greg Kurstin – co-producer (1–6, 8–9), mixing (tracks 6, 8), engineer
- Beck Hansen – co-producer, producer (track 10), mixing (tracks 6, 8), engineer, string arrangements
- Cole M.G.N. – co-producer (track 7), engineer
- Serban Ghenea – mixing (tracks 1–5, 7, 9–10)
- Darrell Thorp – mixing assistant (tracks 6, 8), engineer
- David "Elevator" Greenbaum – mixing assistant (tracks 6, 8), engineer
- Cassidy Turbin – mixing assistant (tracks 6, 8), engineer
- Randy Merrill – mastering
- Emily Lazar – mastering
- Chris Bellman – mastering
- Tom Coyne – mastering
- Alex Pasco – engineer
- Julian Burg – engineer
- Florian Lagatta – engineer
- Jesse Shatkin – engineer
- John Hanes – engineer
- David Campbell – string arrangements, conductor

== Charts ==
Chart (2017)	Peak position
Australian Albums (ARIA)	14
Austrian Albums (Ö3 Austria)	25
Belgian Albums (Ultratop Flanders)	13
Belgian Albums (Ultratop Wallonia)	32
Canadian Albums (Billboard)	4
Czech Albums (ČNS IFPI)	20
Dutch Albums (Album Top 100)	14
French Albums (SNEP)	56
German Albums (Offizielle Top 100)	32
Irish Albums (IRMA)	6
Italian Albums (FIMI)	36
Japan Hot Albums (Billboard)	12
Japanese Albums (Oricon)	13
New Zealand Albums (RMNZ)	8
Norwegian Albums (VG-lista)	24
Scottish Albums (Official Charts)	4
Spanish Albums (PROMUSICAE)	32
Swiss Albums (Schweizer Hitparade)	9
UK Albums (Official Charts)	5
US Billboard 200	3
US Top Alternative Albums (Billboard)	1
US Top Rock Albums (Billboard)	1
