= Up All Night (Beck song) =

- Remix single cover

Single by Beck

from the album Colors
- Released: September 18, 2017
- Genre: Dance-rock; pop rock
- Length: 3:10
- Label: Capitol
- Songwriters: Beck; Greg Kurstin
- Producers: Beck; Greg Kurstin

Beck singles chronology
"Dear Life" (2017)	"Up All Night" (2017)	"Colors" (2018)

Music video
- "Up All Night" on YouTube

"Up All Night" is a song by the American musician Beck. It is the third single (fourth worldwide) from his thirteenth studio album Colors.

== Background and release ==
Before its official release, the song was included in the soundtrack for the video game FIFA 17 in September 2016 and was also used in a commercial for the smartwatch company Fossil.

"Up All Night" was released to triple-A radio September 18, 2017 in the United States as the third single from the album Colors. It was then sent to alternative radio September 19, 2017.

== Live performances ==
Beck performed the song on Later... with Jools Holland and The Ellen DeGeneres Show in October 2017, and on The Tonight Show Starring Jimmy Fallon December 6, 2017.

== Music video ==
The music video, directed and produced by the Catalan production company CANADA, was released on September 6, 2017. It stars French actress Solene Rigot and Pedro Attemborough. It depicts Attemborough falling unconscious during a wild and raucous party while Rigot, adorned in knight's armor and brandishing a shield made from a street sign, rushes through the apartment complex to rescue him. It was nominated for best music video at the 2018 Grammy Awards.

== Track listing ==
- Digital download
1. "Up All Night" (Oliver Remix) – 4:26

== Chart performance ==
"Up All Night" spent seven weeks at number one on the Billboard Alternative Songs airplay chart. This marks Beck's third number-one single and his first since "E-Pro" in 2005. He is one of six acts to accomplish three chart toppers on the Alternative chart in three different decades. The song also spent two weeks at number one on Adult Alternative Airplay and three weeks at number one on the overall Rock Airplay chart. In February 2021, for the 25th anniversary of Adult Alternative Airplay, Billboard published a ranking of the 100 most successful songs in the chart's history; "Up All Night" was placed at number 55.

== Charts ==
=== Weekly charts ===
Chart (2017–18)	Peak position
Belgium (Ultratip Bubbling Under Flanders)	4
Belgium (Ultratip Bubbling Under Wallonia)	24
France (SNEP)	117
Iceland (RÚV)	4
Japan (Japan Hot 100)	46
Japan Hot Overseas (Billboard)	6
Mexico Ingles Airplay (Billboard)	39
US Adult Pop Airplay (Billboard)	30
US Dance Club Songs (Billboard)	12
US Hot Rock & Alternative Songs (Billboard)	10
US Rock & Alternative Airplay (Billboard)	1

=== Year-end charts ===
Chart (2017)	Position
US Hot Rock Songs (Billboard)	90

Chart (2018)	Position
US Hot Rock Songs (Billboard)	27
US Rock Airplay (Billboard)	12
