= Dreams (Beck song) =

Single by Beck

from the album Colors
- B-side: "Instrumental / Acapella (12-inch)"
- Released: June 15, 2015
- Genre: Garage rock; dance-rock; disco
- Length: 5:14 (single version); 4:57 (album version); 4:20 (radio edit)
- Label: Capitol; Fonograf
- Songwriters: Beck Hansen; Andrew Wyatt; Greg Kurstin
- Producer: Greg Kurstin

Beck singles chronology
"Heart Is a Drum" (2014)	"Dreams" (2015)	"Wow" (2016)

"Dreams" is a song by the American alternative rock musician Beck, released on June 15, 2015. The song is the lead single and first release from his thirteenth album, Colors (2017). The song's music is upbeat and funky, in contrast to the more muted sound of his previous album, Morning Phase (2014), with Beck stating that he "was really trying to make something that would be good to play live."

"Dreams" was featured in the soundtrack of the EA Sports game FIFA 16 (2015). The song was heavily featured on Beats 1, Apple Music's flagship radio station, with 65 plays in July 2015.

== Reception ==
=== Critical ===
Rolling Stone ranked "Dreams" at number 23 on its annual year-end list of the best songs of 2015. Billboard also ranked "Dreams" at number 23 on its year-end list for 2015.

=== Commercial ===
"Dreams" was Beck's highest charting single on Alternative radio since "E-Pro" topped the chart in 2005. However, it was blocked from the top spot by "Renegades" by X Ambassadors.

== Charts ==
=== Weekly charts ===
Chart (2015)	Peak position
Belgium (Ultratip Bubbling Under Flanders)	12
Belgium (Ultratip Bubbling Under Wallonia)	37
Canada Hot 100 (Billboard)	81
Czech Republic (IFPI)	68
Iceland (RÚV)	8
France (SNEP)	154
Mexico Ingles Airplay (Billboard)	27
Netherlands Single Tip (MegaCharts)	29
Japan Hot 100 (Billboard)	18
Switzerland Airplay (Schweizer Hitparade)	68
US Bubbling Under Hot 100 (Billboard)	6
US Hot Rock & Alternative Songs (Billboard)	9
US Adult Pop Airplay (Billboard)	37
US Adult Alternative Airplay (Billboard)	1
US Alternative Airplay (Billboard)	2
US Mainstream Rock Airplay (Billboard)	36
US Rock & Alternative Airplay (Billboard)	3

=== Year-end charts ===
Chart (2015)	Position
US Adult Alternative Songs (Billboard)	5
US Alternative Songs (Billboard)	15
US Hot Rock Songs (Billboard)	26
US Rock Airplay Songs (Billboard)	15

== Release history ==
Country	Date	Format	Label	Ref.
Various	June 15, 2015	Digital download	Fonograf; Capitol	
Italy	June 19, 2015	Contemporary hit radio	Capitol	
United States	August 21, 2015	12"	Fonograf; Capitol	
United States	September 14, 2015	Contemporary hit radio	Capitol	
