= DJ Skudero =

Spanish mákina DJ and producer (born 1959)

- Born: Marc Escudero Gonzálvez; March 6, 1976 (age 49); Terrassa, Spain
- Genres: Mákina
- Occupation(s): Electronic musician, DJ, record producer
- Years active: 1994–present
- Labels: Max, Bit

DJ Skudero (born Marc Escudero Gonzálvez, 6 March 1976) is a Spanish mákina DJ and producer who gained prominence in the mid-to-late-1990s with several top ten singles in Spain.

== Discography ==
=== Singles ===
Year	Single	Peak positions	Album
Year	Single	ESP	Album
1996	"Pont Aeri" (as Pastis - Buenri - Skudero)	—	Singles only
1996	"Extasia" (Remix with Dr. Who)	6	Singles only
1996	"Pont Aeri Vol. 2" (as Buenri & Skudero)	2	Singles only
1996	"Kript-On"	—	Singles only
1997	"Pont Aeri Vol. 3" (as Skudero & Xavi Metralla)	5	Singles only
1997	"Fluor"	8	Singles only
1998	"Infectious Flight" (as Skudero meets Gollum)	—	Singles only
1998	"Elements"	1	
1999	"Elements II"	1	
2002	"Nothing Compares 2 U"	—	
2004	"White Flag" (Remix)	—	
2005	"Pont Aeri Vol. 2 - The Countdown" (as Buenri & Skudero)	—	
"—" denotes releases that did not chart
