= Wow (Beck song) =

2016 single by Beck

Single by Beck

from the album Colors
- Released: June 2, 2016
- Genre: Trap
- Length: 3:40
- Label: Capitol; Fonograf
- Songwriters: Beck David Hansen; Cole M. Greif-Neill
- Producers: Beck David Hansen; Cole M.G.N.

Beck singles chronology
"Dreams" (2015)	"Wow" (2016)	"Dear Life" (2017)

Music video
- "Wow" on YouTube

"Wow" is a song by American Musician Beck. It is the second single from his thirteenth studio album Colors (2017). Billboard ranked "Wow" at number 60 on their Billboard's 100 Best Pop Songs of 2016" list.

== Background ==
Hip hop artist Chance the Rapper was originally intended to make a guest appearance on the track: Beck told NME, "Four or five months ago we tried to get Chance on 'Wow.' I'm not sure what happened with that." A version with rapper Lil Yachty was also recorded.

== Usage in media ==
The song was featured in a 2017 Acura MDX car commercial that debuted in September 2016.

== Charts ==
=== Weekly charts ===
Chart (2016)	Peak position
Belgium (Ultratip Bubbling Under Flanders)	8
Japan (Billboard Japan Hot 100)	98
Japan Airplay (Billboard Japan Radio Songs)	19
Mexico Ingles Airplay (Billboard)	35
Netherlands Single Tip (MegaCharts)	30
US Hot Rock & Alternative Songs (Billboard)	12
US Adult Alternative Airplay (Billboard)	5
US Alternative Airplay (Billboard)	10
US Rock & Alternative Airplay (Billboard)	13

=== Year-end charts ===
Chart (2016)	Position
US Adult Alternative Songs (Billboard)	29
US Alternative Songs (Billboard)	30
US Hot Rock Songs (Billboard)	40
US Rock Airplay Songs (Billboard)	34

== Release history ==
Country	Date	Format	Label	Ref.
Worldwide	June 2, 2016	Digital download	Capitol; Fonograf	
Italy	July 1, 2016	Contemporary hit radio	Universal	

== Certifications ==
Certifications for "Wow"
Region	Certification	Certified units/sales
United States (RIAA)	Gold	500,000^{‡}
^{‡} Sales+streaming figures based on certification alone.
