= Automatic (American band) =

American alternative post-punk duo

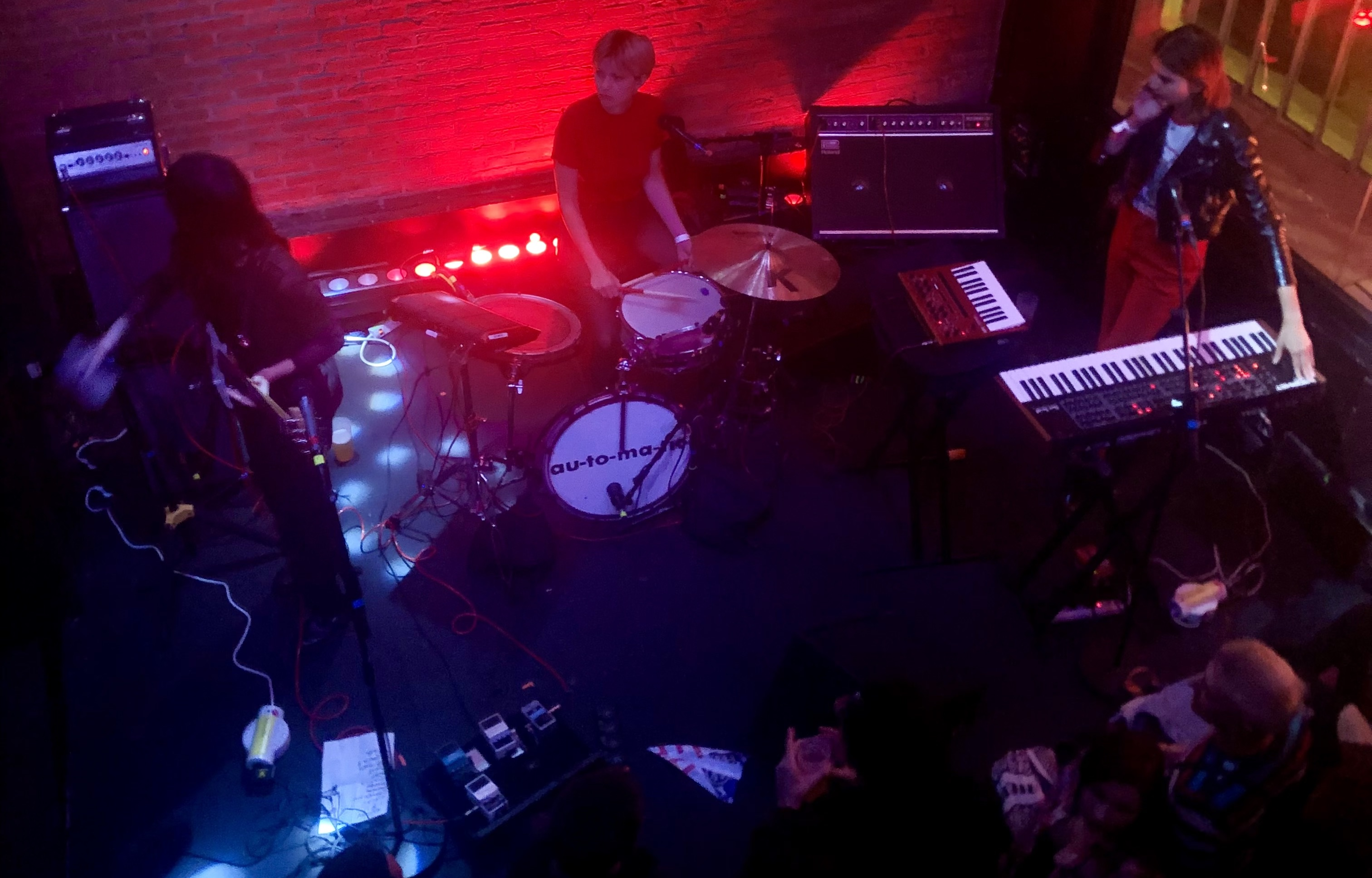
- Automatic live in Paris, 2019

Background information
- Origin: Los Angeles, California, U.S.
- Genres: Post-punk; rock; indie
- Years active: 2017–present
- Label: Stones Throw
- Members: Izzy Glaudini; Halle Saxon
- Past members: Lola Dompé
- Website: automatic.band

Automatic is a rock band from Los Angeles, formed in 2017. The group consists of Izzy Glaudini (synths, vocals) and Halle Saxon (bass, vocals), and formerly Lola Dompé (drums, vocals).

== Biography ==
Glaudini, Saxon, and Dompé met while immersed in L.A.'s DIY music scene and started playing live in 2017, taking their name from the track "Automatic" from the Go-Go's album Beauty and the Beat. The group signed to Los Angeles label Stones Throw in June 2019.

Dompé is the daughter of Bauhaus drummer Kevin Haskins. She joined her first band, art-rock outfit Blackblack, when she was 13.

Automatic announced their debut album Signal with the release of their first single "Calling It" on June 3, 2019. The band put out two more singles, a cover of Delta 5's "Mind Your Own Business" and title track "Signal", before releasing the album on September 27, 2019. Pitchfork described Signal as "an exercise in post-punk and no-wave galvanism". The band released Signal Remixes on March 26, 2021, which included reworks from artists such as Peanut Butter Wolf, Sudan Archives, Peaking Lights, Osees' John Dwyer, and Kevin Haskins.

On March 8, 2022, Automatic announced their new album Excess with the first single "New Beginning". Stereogum described "New Beginning" as "'60s pop kitsch". The group followed it up with their second single "Venus Hour" on April 7, 2022. Excess was released on June 24, 2022 on Stones Throw.

On June 16, 2025, the band released "Is It Now?". On July 22, they announced their third album Is It Now? which was released on September 26, 2025. The Arts Desk described the album as "unforced, moody and engaging", adding that it "reminds occasionally of early OMD... mashed into Marine Girls". Dompé was confirmed to have left the band in June 2026.

== Discography ==
=== Studio albums ===
- Signal (2019)
- Excess (2022)
- Is It Now? (2025)

=== Singles ===
- "Calling It" (2019)
- "Mind Your Own Business" (2019)
- "Signal" (2019)
- "Calling It (Peaking Lights disco rerub)" (2020)
- "High" (2020)
- "Too Much Money (Peanut Butter Wolf remix)" (2020)
- "Suicide in Texas (Panther Modern remix)" (2020)
- "Signal (JooJoo Remix)" (2021)
- "Electrocution (John Dwyer remix)" (2021)
- "Strange Conversations (Sudan Archives remix)" (2021)
- "Signal (Maral remix)" (2021)
- "New Beginning" (2022)
- "Venus Hour" (2022)
- "Skyscraper" (2022)
- “Is It Now?” (2025)
- "Mercury" (2025)
- "Lazy" (2025)
