= Pelada =

Canadian musical duo

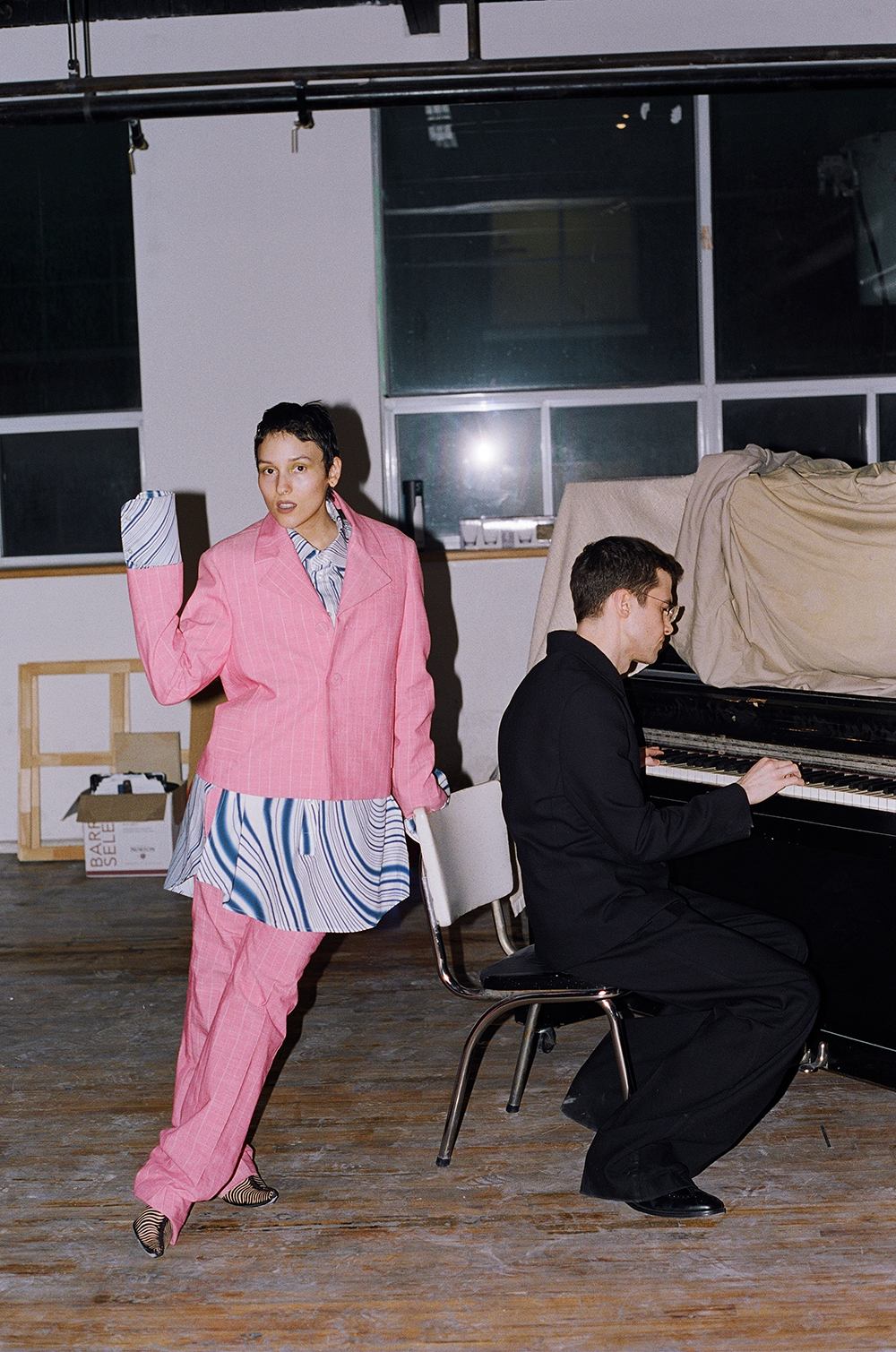
- Pelada press photo

Background information
- Origin: Montréal, Québec, Canada
- Genres: Electronic; house; techno; acid; punk
- Years active: 2014–2024
- Labels: PAN; New Label; Mind Records
- Members: Chris Vargas; Tobias Rochman

Pelada was a Canadian musical duo which formed in 2014. The duo is composed of vocalist Chris Vargas and instrumentalist Tobias Rochman. The group's music emphasizes minimalist electronic instrumentation, including synthesizers, samplers and MIDI based drum machines, coupled with Vargas's Spanish-language lyrics.

== Career ==
Their debut album Movimiento Para Cambio (2019) released by Berlin experimental electronic label PAN was described by Pitchfork as having a "subtly fraught quality—lovely as a sunset, yet disturbed by a hidden undercurrent—feels like the duo’s way of acknowledging our fundamental vulnerability", while AllMusic defined the group as a "punk-informed, revolution-minded dance duo from Montreal." DJ Mag called them "a vital and contemporary addition dance music’s punk canon." Mixmag included them on the "Best Albums of The Decade" list saying "[a] fierce sense of urgency drives the Montreal duo’s debut album. Producer Tobias Rochman lays a foundation of bright rave synths, palpitating Latin percussive rhythms, atmospheric trance and earth-shattering acid, which vocalist Chris Vargas takes to another level with acid-tongued lyrical delivery, delving into themes spanning patriarchal oppression to surveillance culture to the impending climate catastrophe in sharp Spanish language polemics."

Furthermore, Movimiento Para Cambio was featured on The Guardian's "Albums and Tracks of 2019", Resident Advisor's "2019's Best Albums", Fact Mag's "Best Albums of 2019", and topped Stereogum's "10 Best Electronic Albums of 2019" list

Pelada toured North America with punk groups such as Iceage, as well as festivals in Mexico, and raves in Russia and Europe, including clubs such as Berlin super club Berghain.

Ahora más que nunca was a longlisted nominee for the 2024 Polaris Music Prize.

In 2024, the group announced that they would be completing their last shows together as a duo, after which they disbanded.

== Discography ==
=== Studio albums ===
- Movimiento Para Cambio (2019)

=== EPs ===
- EP1 (2016)

=== Singles ===
- "No Hay" / "Ten Cuidado" (2016)

=== Music videos ===
- "Desatado" (2017)
